= List of the busiest airports in Germany =

This is a list of the busiest airports in Germany.

== 2025 ==
Rank	Airport	IATA	City/metro area	State	Passengers (Note: Figures refer to total traffic including transit passengers (Gesamtaufkommen).)	Change 2024-2025
1	Frankfurt	FRA	Frankfurt Rhine-Main	Hesse	63,186,114	▲2.6%
2	Munich	MUC	Munich Metropolitan Region	Bavaria	43,394,442	▲4.4%
3	Berlin Brandenburg	BER	Berlin/Brandenburg Metropolitan Region	Brandenburg	26,050,880	▲2.3%
4	Düsseldorf	DUS	Düsseldorf / Rhine-Ruhr	North Rhine-Westphalia	21,031,429	▲4.9%
5	Hamburg	HAM	Hamburg Metropolitan Region	Hamburg	14,770,812	▼−0.4%
6	Cologne/Bonn	CGN	Cologne, Bonn / Rhine-Ruhr	North Rhine-Westphalia	10,060,452	▲0.5%
7	Stuttgart	STR	Stuttgart	Baden-Württemberg	9,585,033	▲4.7%
8	Hanover	HAJ	Hanover	Lower Saxony	5,344,722	▲2.3%
9	Nuremberg	NUE	Nuremberg	Bavaria	4,508,700	▲11.9%
10	Memmingen	FMM	Memmingen	Bavaria	3,698,900	▲13.9%
11	Dortmund	DTM	Dortmund	North Rhine-Westphalia	3,242,429	▲3.5%
12	Karlsruhe/Baden-Baden	FKB	Karlsruhe / Baden-Baden	Baden-Württemberg	2,257,542	▲25.3%
13	Weeze	NRN	Weeze	North Rhine-Westphalia	2,245,473	▲14.0%
14	Hahn	HHN	Hahn	Rhineland-Palatinate	2,196,229	▲17.8%
15	Leipzig/Halle	LEJ	Leipzig / Halle	Saxony	2,119,170	▼−3.7%
16	Bremen	BRE	Bremen	Bremen	1,992,727	▲5.6%
17	Münster/Osnabrück	FMO	Münster / Osnabrück	North Rhine-Westphalia	1,254,072	▼−2.4%
18	Dresden	DRS	Dresden / Klotzsche	Saxony	886,578	▲0.5%
19	Paderborn	PAD	Paderborn / Lippstadt	North Rhine-Westphalia	711,400	▼−13.1%
20	Erfurt/Weimar	ERF	Erfurt	Thuringia	314,108	▲85.1%
21	Saarbrücken	SCN	Saarbrücken	Saarland	307,731	▼−9.3%
22	Friedrichshafen	FDH	Friedrichshafen	Baden-Württemberg	250,884	▲10.4%
23	Sylt	GWT	Sylt	Schleswig-Holstein	123,675	▲1.9%
24	Lübeck	LBC	Lübeck	Schleswig-Holstein	113,359	▲59.7%
25	Braunschweig Wolfsburg	BWE	Braunschweig / Wolfsburg	Lower Saxony	49,055	▼−23.1%
26	Rostock	RLG	Rostock	Mecklenburg-Vorpommern	37,373	▼−26.4%
27	Kassel	KSF	Kassel	Hesse	29,615	▼−64.3%
28	Mönchengladbach	MGL	Mönchengladbach	North Rhine-Westphalia	28,887	▼−2.1%

== 2024 ==
Rank	Airport	IATA	City/metro area	State	Passengers	Change 2023-2024
1	Frankfurt	FRA	Frankfurt Rhine-Main	Hesse	61.499.642	▲3.7%
2	Munich	MUC	Munich Metropolitan Region	Bavaria	41.547.174	▲12.2%
3	Berlin Brandenburg	BER	Berlin/Brandenburg Metropolitan Region	Brandenburg	25.458.056	▲10.4%
4	Düsseldorf	DUS	Düsseldorf / Rhine-Ruhr	North Rhine-Westphalia	20.031.461	▲4.8%
5	Hamburg	HAM	Hamburg Metropolitan Region	Hamburg	14.828.371	▲9.4%
6	Cologne/Bonn	CGN	Cologne, Bonn / Rhine-Ruhr	North Rhine-Westphalia	9.997.183	▲2.5%
7	Stuttgart	STR	Stuttgart	Baden-Württemberg	9.141.858	▲8.5%
8	Hanover	HAJ	Hanover	Lower Saxony	5.216.530	▲13.6%
9	Nuremberg	NUE	Nuremberg	Bavaria	4.017.054	▲2.9%
10	Memmingen	FMM	Memmingen	Bavaria	3.245.826	▲14.9%
11	Dortmund	DTM	Dortmund	North Rhine-Westphalia	3.132.870	▲6.8%
12	Leipzig/Halle	LEJ	Leipzig / Halle	Saxony	2.195.880	▲4.9%
13	Weeze	NRN	Weeze	North Rhine-Westphalia	1.970.431	▲23.5%
14	Bremen	BRE	Bremen	Bremen	1.885.848	▲4%
15	Hahn	HHN	Hahn	Rhineland-Palatinate	1.818.003	▲11%
16	Karlsruhe/Baden-Baden	FKB	Karlsruhe / Baden-Baden	Baden-Württemberg	1.800.355	▲4%
17	Münster/Osnabrück	FMO	Münster / Osnabrück	North Rhine-Westphalia	1.283.691	▲29.7%
18	Dresden	DRS	Dresden / Klotzsche	Saxony	881.391	▼-4.3%
19	Paderborn	PAD	Paderborn / Lippstadt	North Rhine-Westphalia	815.976	▲12.8%
20	Saarbrücken	SCN	Saarbrücken	Saarland	339.141	▲9.3%
21	Friedrichshafen	FDH	Friedrichshafen	Baden-Württemberg	227.242	▼-27.7%
22	Erfurt/Weimar	ERF	Erfurt	Thuringia	167.691	▲24.6%
23	Sylt	GWT	Sylt	Schleswig-Holstein	121.383	▼-3.5%
24	Kassel	KSF	Kassel	Hesse	82.890	▼-22.5%
25	Lübeck	LBC	Lübeck	Schleswig-Holstein	70.926	▼-13.7%
26	Braunschweig Wolfsburg	BWE	Braunschweig / Wolfsburg	Lower Saxony	63.776	▲0.9%
27	Rostock	RLG	Rostock	Mecklenburg-Vorpommern	50.282	▼-4.4%
28	Mönchengladbach	MGL	Mönchengladbach	North Rhine-Westphalia	29.507	▲3.2%

== 2023 ==
Rank	Airport	IATA	City/metro area	State	Passengers	Change 2022-2023
1	Frankfurt	FRA	Frankfurt Rhine-Main	Hesse	59,355,389	▲16.3%
2	Munich	MUC	Munich Metropolitan Region	Bavaria	37,037,070	▲17.0%
3	Berlin Brandenburg	BER	Berlin/Brandenburg Metropolitan Region	Brandenburg	23,071,865	▲16.3%
4	Düsseldorf	DUS	Düsseldorf / Rhine-Ruhr	North Rhine-Westphalia	19,118,928	▲19.0%
5	Hamburg	HAM	Hamburg Metropolitan Region	Hamburg	13,559,912	▲22.2%
6	Cologne/Bonn	CGN	Cologne, Bonn / Rhine-Ruhr	North Rhine-Westphalia	9,763,127	▲11.5%
7	Stuttgart	STR	Stuttgart	Baden-Württemberg	8,438,084	▲20.8%
8	Hanover	HAJ	Hanover	Lower Saxony	4,599,823	▲16.1%
9	Nuremberg	NUE	Nuremberg	Bavaria	3,923,254	▲19.9%
10	Dortmund	DTM	Dortmund	North Rhine-Westphalia	2,934,316	▲13.5%
11	Memmingen	FMM	Memmingen	Bavaria	2,824,711	▲41.9%
12	Leipzig/Halle	LEJ	Leipzig / Halle	Saxony	2,101,425	▲34.8%
13	Bremen	BRE	Bremen	Bremen	1,814,892	▲21.6%
14	Karlsruhe/Baden-Baden	FKB	Karlsruhe / Baden-Baden	Baden-Württemberg	1,733,051	▲32.8%
15	Hahn	HHN	Hahn	Rhineland-Palatinate	1,673,219	▲21.5%
16	Weeze	NRN	Weeze	North Rhine-Westphalia	1,595,785	▲53.9%
17	Münster/Osnabrück	FMO	Münster / Osnabrück	North Rhine-Westphalia	991,031	▲19.3%
18	Dresden	DRS	Dresden / Klotzsche	Saxony	929,928	▲10.9%
19	Paderborn	PAD	Paderborn / Lippstadt	North Rhine-Westphalia	723,581	▲44.0%
20	Friedrichshafen	FDH	Friedrichshafen	Baden-Württemberg	314,953	▼-7.2%
21	Saarbrücken	SCN	Saarbrücken	Saarland	310,734	▲3.6%
22	Erfurt/Weimar	ERF	Erfurt	Thuringia	136,929	▼-0.6%
23	Sylt	GWT	Sylt	Schleswig-Holstein	125,745	▲5.0%
24	Kassel	KSF	Kassel	Hesse	107,615	▼-6.9%
25	Lübeck	LBC	Lübeck	Schleswig-Holstein	82,550	▼-0.0%
26	Braunschweig Wolfsburg	BWE	Braunschweig / Wolfsburg	Lower Saxony	63,361	▲46.3%
27	Rostock	RLG	Rostock	Mecklenburg-Vorpommern	53,685	▼-12.0%
28	Mönchengladbach	MGL	Mönchengladbach	North Rhine-Westphalia	28,582	▼-15.5%

== 2022 ==
Rank	Airport	IATA	City/metro area	State	Passengers	Change 2021-2022
1	Frankfurt	FRA	Frankfurt Rhine-Main	Hesse	48,918,482	▲97.1%
2	Munich	MUC	Munich Metropolitan Region	Bavaria	31,642,738	▲153.2%
3	Berlin Brandenburg	BER	Berlin/Brandenburg Metropolitan Region	Brandenburg	19,845,046	▲99.5%
4	Düsseldorf	DUS	Düsseldorf / Rhine-Ruhr	North Rhine-Westphalia	16,071,936	▲102.1%
5	Hamburg	HAM	Hamburg Metropolitan Region	Hamburg	11,096,296	▲108.6%
6	Cologne/Bonn	CGN	Cologne, Bonn / Rhine-Ruhr	North Rhine-Westphalia	8,756,712	▲105.9%
7	Stuttgart	STR	Stuttgart	Baden-Württemberg	6,986,943	▲95.5%
8	Hanover	HAJ	Hanover	Lower Saxony	3,961,983	▲92.6%
9	Nuremberg	NUE	Nuremberg	Bavaria	3,272,138	▲207.8%
10	Dortmund	DTM	Dortmund	North Rhine-Westphalia	2,586,238	▲52.8%
11	Memmingen	FMM	Memmingen	Bavaria	1,991,208	▲103.0%
12	Leipzig/Halle	LEJ	Leipzig / Halle	Saxony	1,558,602	▲133.4%
13	Bremen	BRE	Bremen	Bremen	1,493,007	▲137.0%
14	Hahn	HHN	Hahn	Rhineland-Palatinate	1,377,087	▲103.5%
15	Karlsruhe/Baden-Baden	FKB	Karlsruhe / Baden-Baden	Baden-Württemberg	1,304,701	▲114.1%
16	Weeze	NRN	Weeze	North Rhine-Westphalia	1,036,882	▲76.5%
17	Dresden	DRS	Dresden / Klotzsche	Saxony	838,387	▲155.4%
18	Münster/Osnabrück	FMO	Münster / Osnabrück	North Rhine-Westphalia	830,772	▲131.5%
19	Paderborn	PAD	Paderborn / Lippstadt	North Rhine-Westphalia	502,621	▲288.7%
20	Friedrichshafen	FDH	Friedrichshafen	Baden-Württemberg	339,556	▲169.8%
21	Saarbrücken	SCN	Saarbrücken	Saarland	300,034	▲99.7%
22	Erfurt/Weimar	ERF	Erfurt	Thuringia	137,779	▲92.3%
23	Sylt	GWT	Sylt	Schleswig-Holstein	119,763	▲17.4%
24	Kassel	KSF	Kassel	Hesse	115,597	▲207.1%
25	Lübeck	LBC	Lübeck	Schleswig-Holstein	82,590	▲286.5%
26	Rostock	RLG	Rostock	Mecklenburg-Vorpommern	60,997	▲185.0%
27	Braunschweig Wolfsburg	BWE	Braunschweig Wolfsburg	Lower Saxony	43,315	▲46.4%
28	Mönchengladbach	MGL	Mönchengladbach	North Rhine-Westphalia	33,842	▼-12.9%

== 2021 ==
Rank	Airport	IATA	City/metro area	State	Passengers	Change 2020-2021
1	Frankfurt	FRA	Frankfurt / Rhine-Main	Hesse	24,812,819	▲32.3%
2	Munich	MUC	Munich	Bavaria	12,496,434	▲12.5%
3	Berlin Brandenburg	BER	Berlin/Brandenburg Metropolitan Region	Brandenburg	9,946,037	▲9.3% (Note: Increase in traffic is over combined Berlin Tegel Airport and Berlin Schönefeld Airport traffic in 2020.)
4	Düsseldorf	DUS	Düsseldorf / Rhine-Ruhr	North Rhine-Westphalia	7,953,014	▲20.9%
5	Hamburg	HAM	Hamburg	Hamburg	5,318,698	▲16.6%
6	Cologne/Bonn	CGN	Cologne, Bonn / Rhine-Ruhr	North Rhine-Westphalia	4,253,568	▲38.1%
7	Stuttgart	STR	Stuttgart	Baden-Württemberg	3,573,728	▲11.4%
8	Hanover	HAJ	Hanover	Lower Saxony	2,057,452	▲41.7%
9	Dortmund	DTM	Dortmund	North Rhine-Westphalia	1,693,050	▲38.7%
10	Nuremberg	NUE	Nuremberg	Bavaria	1,063,153	▲15.9%
11	Memmingen	FMM	Memmingen	Bavaria	980,708	▲41.9%
12	Hahn	HHN	Hahn	Rhineland-Palatinate	676,829	▲54.9%
13	Leipzig/Halle	LEJ	Leipzig / Halle	Saxony	667,784	▲25.9%
14	Bremen	BRE	Bremen	Bremen	630,062	▲5.9%
15	Karlsruhe/Baden-Baden	FKB	Karlsruhe / Baden-Baden	Baden-Württemberg	609,459	▲55.6%
16	Weeze	NRN	Weeze	North Rhine-Westphalia	587,478	▲113.5%
17	Münster/Osnabrück	FMO	Münster / Osnabrück	North Rhine-Westphalia	358,905	▲62.9%
18	Dresden	DRS	Dresden / Klotzsche	Saxony	328,276	▼14.4%
19	Saarbrücken	SCN	Saarbrücken	Saarland	150,220	▲191.5%
20	Paderborn	PAD	Paderborn / Lippstadt	North Rhine-Westphalia	129,292	▲39.7%
21	Friedrichshafen	FDH	Friedrichshafen	Baden-Württemberg	125,841	▲5.7%
22	Sylt	GWT	Sylt	Schleswig-Holstein	101,991	▲15.7%
23	Erfurt/Weimar	ERF	Erfurt	Thuringia	71,665	▲160.2%
24	Mönchengladbach	MGL	Mönchengladbach	North Rhine-Westphalia	38,861	▲8.9%
25	Kassel	KSF	Kassel	Hesse	37,639	▲65.3%
26	Braunschweig Wolfsburg	BWE	Braunschweig Wolfsburg	Lower Saxony	29,586	▼26.9%
27	Rostock	RLG	Rostock	Mecklenburg-Vorpommern	21,402	▼9.0%
28	Lübeck	LBC	Lübeck	Schleswig-Holstein	21,366	▲113.3%

== 2020 ==
Rank	Airport	IATA	City/metro area	State	Passengers	Change 2019-2020
1	Frankfurt	FRA	Frankfurt / Rhine-Main	Hesse	18,768,601	▼73.4%
2	Munich	MUC	Munich	Bavaria	11,112,773	▼76.8%
3	Düsseldorf	DUS	Düsseldorf / Rhine-Ruhr	North Rhine-Westphalia	6,577,392	▼74.2%
4	Berlin Tegel	TXL	Berlin, Potsdam	Berlin	5,870,756	▼75.8%
5	Hamburg	HAM	Hamburg	Hamburg	4,562,014	▼73.6%
6	Berlin Schönefeld	SXF	Berlin, Potsdam	Brandenburg	3,227,032	▼71.7%
7	Stuttgart	STR	Stuttgart	Baden-Württemberg	3,207,440	▼74.8%
8	Cologne/Bonn	CGN	Cologne, Bonn / Rhine-Ruhr	North Rhine-Westphalia	3,081,159	▼75.1%
9	Hanover	HAJ	Hanover	Lower Saxony	1,452,361	▼77.0%
10	Dortmund	DTM	Dortmund	North Rhine-Westphalia	1,220,624	▼55.1%
11	Nuremberg	NUE	Nuremberg	Bavaria	916,963	▼77.7%
12	Memmingen	FMM	Memmingen	Bavaria	690,780	▼59.9%
13	Bremen	BRE	Bremen	Bremen	594,680	▼74.2%
14	Leipzig/Halle	LEJ	Leipzig / Halle	Saxony	530,221	▼79.7%
15	Hahn	HHN	Hahn	Rhineland-Palatinate	436,862	▼70.8%
16	Karlsruhe/Baden-Baden	FKB	Karlsruhe / Baden-Baden	Baden-Württemberg	391,696	▼70.7%
17	Dresden	DRS	Dresden / Klotzsche	Saxony	383,568	▼76.0%
18	Weeze	NRN	Weeze	North Rhine-Westphalia	275,220	▼77.6%
19	Münster/Osnabrück	FMO	Münster / Osnabrück	North Rhine-Westphalia	220,381	▼77.7%
20	Friedrichshafen	FDH	Friedrichshafen	Baden-Württemberg	119,040	▼75.7%
21	Paderborn	PAD	Paderborn / Lippstadt	North Rhine-Westphalia	92,547	▼86.7%
22	Saarbrücken	SCN	Saarbrücken	Saarland	51,542	▼85.9%
23	Erfurt/Weimar	ERF	Erfurt	Thuringia	27,542	▼82.4%
24	Rostock	RLG	Rostock	Mecklenburg-Vorpommern	-	-
25	Kassel	KSF	Kassel	Hesse	-	-
26	Sylt	GWT	Sylt	Schleswig-Holstein	-	-
27	Heringsdorf	HDF	Heringsdorf	Mecklenburg-Vorpommern	-	-

== 2019 ==
Rank	Airport	IATA	City/metro area	State	Passengers	Change 2018-2019
1	Frankfurt	FRA	Frankfurt / Rhine-Main	Hesse	70,556,072	▲1.5%
2	Munich	MUC	Munich	Bavaria	47,941,378	▲3.6%
3	Düsseldorf	DUS	Düsseldorf / Rhine-Ruhr	North Rhine-Westphalia	25,507,566	▲5.0%
4	Berlin Tegel	TXL	Berlin, Potsdam	Berlin	24,227,570	▲10.1%
5	Hamburg	HAM	Hamburg	Hamburg	17,308,773	▲0.4%
6	Stuttgart	STR	Stuttgart	Baden-Württemberg	12,721,441	▲7.6%
7	Cologne/Bonn	CGN	Cologne, Bonn / Rhine-Ruhr	North Rhine-Westphalia	12,368,519	▼4.5%
8	Berlin Schönefeld	SXF	Berlin, Potsdam	Brandenburg	11,417,435	▼10.3%
9	Hanover	HAJ	Hanover	Lower Saxony	6,301,366	▼0.4%
10	Nuremberg	NUE	Nuremberg	Bavaria	4,111,689	▼8.0%
11	Leipzig/Halle	LEJ	Leipzig / Halle	Saxony	2,615,801	▲1.9%
12	Dortmund	DTM	Dortmund	North Rhine-Westphalia	2,719,566	▲19.1%
13	Bremen	BRE	Bremen	Bremen	2,308,338	▼9.9%
14	Dresden	DRS	Dresden / Klotzsche	Saxony	1,595,765	▼9.3%
15	Hahn	HHN	Hahn	Rhineland-Palatinate	1,496,362	▼28.5%
16	Karlsruhe/Baden-Baden	FKB	Karlsruhe / Baden-Baden	Baden-Württemberg	1,335,957	▲7.1%
17	Memmingen	FMM	Memmingen	Bavaria	1,722,764	▲15.4%
18	Weeze	NRN	Weeze	North Rhine-Westphalia	1,231,100	▼26.3%
19	Münster/Osnabrück	FMO	Münster / Osnabrück	North Rhine-Westphalia	986,260	▼3.3%
20	Paderborn	PAD	Paderborn / Lippstadt	North Rhine-Westphalia	693,404	▼5.8%
21	Friedrichshafen	FDH	Friedrichshafen	Baden-Württemberg	489,921	▼9.4%
22	Saarbrücken	SCN	Saarbrücken	Saarland	366,574	▲2.1%
23	Rostock	RLG	Rostock	Mecklenburg-Vorpommern	-	▲0.0%
24	Erfurt/Weimar	ERF	Erfurt	Thuringia	156,326	▼40.5%
25	Kassel	KSF	Kassel	Hesse	-	▲0.0%
26	Sylt	GWT	Sylt	Schleswig-Holstein	-	▲0.0%
27	Heringsdorf	HDF	Heringsdorf	Mecklenburg-Vorpommern	-	▲0.0%

== 2018 ==
Rank	Airport	IATA	City/metro area	State	Passengers	Change 2017-2018
1	Frankfurt	FRA	Frankfurt / Rhine-Main	Hesse	69,510,269	▲7.8%
2	Munich	MUC	Munich	Bavaria	46,253,623	▲3.8%
3	Düsseldorf	DUS	Düsseldorf / Rhine-Ruhr	North Rhine-Westphalia	24,283,967	▼1.4%
4	Berlin Tegel	TXL	Berlin, Potsdam	Berlin	22,000,430	▲7.5%
5	Hamburg	HAM	Hamburg	Hamburg	17,234,229	▼2.2%
6	Cologne/Bonn	CGN	Cologne, Bonn / Rhine-Ruhr	North Rhine-Westphalia	12,957,828	▲4.6%
7	Berlin Schönefeld	SXF	Berlin, Potsdam	Brandenburg	12,725,937	▼1.1%
8	Stuttgart	STR	Stuttgart	Baden-Württemberg	11,820,612	▲7.8%
9	Hanover	HAJ	Hanover	Lower Saxony	6,324,634	▲7.7%
10	Nuremberg	NUE	Nuremberg	Bavaria	4,466,864	▲6.7%
11	Leipzig/Halle	LEJ	Leipzig / Halle	Saxony	2,567,583	▲8.7%
12	Bremen	BRE	Bremen	Bremen	2,561,535	▲0.8%
13	Dortmund	DTM	Dortmund	North Rhine-Westphalia	2,284,176	▲14.2%
14	Hahn	HHN	Hahn	Rhineland-Palatinate	2,092,868	▼15.3%
15	Dresden	DRS	Dresden / Klotzsche	Saxony	1,758,913	▲3.1%
16	Weeze	NRN	Weeze	North Rhine-Westphalia	1,669,476	▼11.5%
17	Memmingen	FMM	Memmingen	Bavaria	1,492,553	▲26.5%
18	Karlsruhe/Baden-Baden	FKB	Karlsruhe / Baden-Baden	Baden-Württemberg	1,246,969	▲0.5%
19	Münster/Osnabrück	FMO	Münster / Osnabrück	North Rhine-Westphalia	1,020,302	▲6.0%
20	Paderborn	PAD	Paderborn / Lippstadt	North Rhine-Westphalia	736,158	▲0.3%
21	Friedrichshafen	FDH	Friedrichshafen	Baden-Württemberg	540,782	▲4.6%
22	Saarbrücken	SCN	Saarbrücken	Saarland	358,868	▼9.6%
23	Rostock	RLG	Rostock	Mecklenburg-Vorpommern	296,027	▲1.8%
24	Erfurt/Weimar	ERF	Erfurt	Thuringia	262,530	▼7.1%
25	Kassel	KSF	Kassel	Hesse	131,817	▲88.8%
26	Sylt	GWT	Sylt	Schleswig-Holstein	125,000	▼10.7%
27	Heringsdorf	HDF	Heringsdorf	Mecklenburg-Vorpommern	31,038	▼3.0%

== 2017 ==
Rank	Airport	IATA	City/metro area	State	Passengers	Change 2016-2017
1	Frankfurt	FRA	Frankfurt / Rhine-Main	Hesse	64,500,386	▲6.1%
2	Munich	MUC	Munich	Bavaria	44,577,241	▲5.5%
3	Düsseldorf	DUS	Düsseldorf / Rhine-Ruhr	North Rhine-Westphalia	24,640,564	▲4.8%
4	Berlin Tegel	TXL	Berlin, Potsdam	Berlin	20,460,688	▼3.7%
5	Hamburg	HAM	Hamburg	Hamburg	17,622,997	▲8.6%
6	Berlin Schönefeld	SXF	Berlin, Potsdam	Brandenburg	12,865,312	▲10.4%
7	Cologne/Bonn	CGN	Cologne, Bonn / Rhine-Ruhr	North Rhine-Westphalia	12,384,223	▲4.0%
8	Stuttgart	STR	Stuttgart	Baden-Württemberg	10,962,247	▲3.2%
9	Hanover	HAJ	Hanover	Lower Saxony	5,870,104	▲8.5%
10	Nuremberg	NUE	Nuremberg	Bavaria	4,186,961	▲20.1%
11	Bremen	BRE	Bremen	Bremen	2,540,084	▼1.3%
12	Hahn	HHN	Hahn	Rhineland-Palatinate	2,471,900	▼5.3%
13	Leipzig/Halle	LEJ	Leipzig / Halle	Saxony	2,361,534	▲7.8%
14	Dortmund	DTM	Dortmund	North Rhine-Westphalia	2,000,695	▲4.3%
15	Weeze	NRN	Weeze	North Rhine-Westphalia	1,885,811	▲1.7%
16	Dresden	DRS	Dresden / Klotzsche	Saxony	1,706,563	▲2.5%
17	Karlsruhe/Baden-Baden	FKB	Karlsruhe / Baden-Baden	Baden-Württemberg	1,240,551	▲12.3%
18	Memmingen	FMM	Memmingen	Bavaria	1,179,875	▲18.4%
19	Münster/Osnabrück	FMO	Münster / Osnabrück	North Rhine-Westphalia	962,348	▲23.1%
20	Paderborn	PAD	Paderborn / Lippstadt	North Rhine-Westphalia	738,474	▲4.6%
21	Friedrichshafen	FDH	Friedrichshafen	Baden-Württemberg	517,209	▼1.3%
22	Saarbrücken	SCN	Saarbrücken	Saarland	396,849	▼7.2%
23	Rostock	RLG	Rostock	Mecklenburg-Vorpommern	290,654	▲31%
24	Erfurt/Weimar	ERF	Erfurt	Thuringia	282,731	▲20.1%

== 2016 ==
Rank	Airport	IATA	City/metro area	State	Passengers	Change 2015-2016
1	Frankfurt	FRA	Frankfurt / Rhine-Main	Hesse	60,786,937	▼0.4%
2	Munich	MUC	Munich	Bavaria	42,261,309	▲3.1%
3	Düsseldorf	DUS	Düsseldorf / Rhine-Ruhr	North Rhine-Westphalia	23,521,919	▲4.7%
4	Berlin Tegel	TXL	Berlin, Potsdam	Berlin	21,253,959	▲1.2%
5	Hamburg	HAM	Hamburg	Hamburg	16,224,154	▲3.9%
6	Cologne/Bonn	CGN	Cologne, Bonn / Rhine-Ruhr	North Rhine-Westphalia	11,910,138	▲15.2%
7	Berlin Schönefeld	SXF	Berlin, Potsdam	Brandenburg	11,652,922	▲36.7%
8	Stuttgart	STR	Stuttgart	Baden-Württemberg	10,626,430	▲1.1%
9	Hanover	HAJ	Hanover	Lower Saxony	5,408,814	▼0.8%
10	Nuremberg	NUE	Nuremberg	Bavaria	3,485,372	▲3.1%
11	Hahn	HHN	Hahn	Rhineland-Palatinate	2,608,984	▼2.1%
12	Bremen	BRE	Bremen	Bremen	2,573,502	▼3.3%
13	Leipzig/Halle	LEJ	Leipzig / Halle	Saxony	2,189,804	▼5.5%
14	Dortmund	DTM	Dortmund	North Rhine-Westphalia	1,918,845	▼3.4%
15	Weeze	NRN	Weeze	North Rhine-Westphalia	1,853,818	▼2.9%
16	Dresden	DRS	Dresden / Klotzsche	Saxony	1,664,676	▼3.4%
17	Karlsruhe/Baden-Baden	FKB	Karlsruhe / Baden-Baden	Baden-Württemberg	1,105,103	▲5.1%
18	Memmingen	FMM	Memmingen	Bavaria	996,714	▲12.8%
19	Münster/Osnabrück	FMO	Münster / Osnabrück	North Rhine-Westphalia	781,753	▼4.3%
20	Paderborn	PAD	Paderborn / Lippstadt	North Rhine-Westphalia	706,268	▼8.5%
21	Friedrichshafen	FDH	Friedrichshafen	Baden-Württemberg	523,888	▼6.4%
22	Saarbrücken	SCN	Saarbrücken	Saarland	427,566	▼8.5%
23	Rostock	RLG	Rostock	Mecklenburg-Vorpommern	250,199	▲31%
24	Erfurt/Weimar	ERF	Erfurt	Thuringia	235,331	▲2.1%

== 2015 ==
Rank	Airport	IATA	City/metro area	State	Passengers	Change 2014-2015
1	Frankfurt	FRA	Frankfurt / Rhine-Main	Hesse	61,032,022	▲2.5%
2	Munich	MUC	Munich	Bavaria	40,981,522	▲3.2%
3	Düsseldorf	DUS	Düsseldorf / Rhine-Ruhr	North Rhine-Westphalia	22,476,685	▲2.9%
4	Berlin Tegel	TXL	Berlin, Potsdam	Berlin	21,005,196	▲1.5%
5	Hamburg	HAM	Hamburg	Hamburg	15,610,072	▲5.8%
6	Stuttgart	STR	Stuttgart	Baden-Württemberg	10,512,225	▲8.2%
7	Cologne/Bonn	CGN	Cologne, Bonn / Rhine-Ruhr	North Rhine-Westphalia	10,338,375	▲9.4%
8	Berlin Schönefeld	SXF	Berlin, Potsdam	Brandenburg	8,526,268	▲16.9%
9	Hanover	HAJ	Hanover	Lower Saxony	5,452,669	▲3.0%
10	Nuremberg	NUE	Nuremberg	Bavaria	3,381,681	▲3.8%
11	Hahn	HHN	Hahn	Rhineland-Palatinate	2,665,105	▲8.9%
12	Bremen	BRE	Bremen	Bremen	2,660,754	▼4.1%
13	Leipzig/Halle	LEJ	Leipzig / Halle	Saxony	2,317,255	▼0.5%
14	Dortmund	DTM	Dortmund	North Rhine-Westphalia	1,985,379	▲1.0%
15	Weeze	NRN	Weeze	North Rhine-Westphalia	1,909,704	▲5.7%
16	Dresden	DRS	Dresden / Klotzsche	Saxony	1,722,863	▼1.9%
17	Karlsruhe/Baden-Baden	FKB	Karlsruhe / Baden-Baden	Baden-Württemberg	1,051,435	▲6.9%
18	Memmingen	FMM	Memmingen	Bavaria	883,490	▲17.8%
19	Münster/Osnabrück	FMO	Münster / Osnabrück	North Rhine-Westphalia	817,049	▼8.6%
20	Paderborn	PAD	Paderborn / Lippstadt	North Rhine-Westphalia	771,749	▲1.0%
21	Friedrichshafen	FDH	Friedrichshafen	Baden-Württemberg	559,985	▼6.1%
22	Saarbrücken	SCN	Saarbrücken	Saarland	467,092	▲17.3%
23	Erfurt/Weimar	ERF	Erfurt	Thuringia	230,436	▲1.7%
24	Rostock	RLG	Rostock	Mecklenburg-Vorpommern	190,869	▲12.3%

== 2014 ==
Rank	Airport	IATA	City/metro area	State	Passengers	Change 2013-2014
1	Frankfurt	FRA	Frankfurt / Rhine-Main	Hesse	59,566,132	▲2.6%
2	Munich	MUC	Munich	Bavaria	39,700,515	▲2.7%
3	Düsseldorf	DUS	Düsseldorf / Rhine-Ruhr	North Rhine-Westphalia	21,850,489	▲2.9%
4	Berlin Tegel	TXL	Berlin, Potsdam	Berlin	20,688,016	▲5.6%
5	Hamburg	HAM	Hamburg	Hamburg	14,760,280	▲9.3%
6	Stuttgart	STR	Stuttgart	Baden-Württemberg	9,718,438	▲1.5%
7	Cologne/Bonn	CGN	Cologne, Bonn / Rhine-Ruhr	North Rhine-Westphalia	9,450,493	▲4.1%
8	Berlin Schönefeld	SXF	Berlin, Potsdam	Brandenburg	7,292,517	▼8.4%
9	Hanover	HAJ	Hanover	Lower Saxony	5,291,882	▲1.1%
10	Nuremberg	NUE	Nuremberg	Bavaria	3,257,348	▼1.6%
11	Bremen	BRE	Bremen	Bremen	2,773,129	▲6.1%
12	Hahn	HHN	Hahn	Rhineland-Palatinate	2,447,140	▼8.3%
13	Leipzig/Halle	LEJ	Leipzig / Halle	Saxony	2,328,341	▲4.2%
14	Dortmund	DTM	Dortmund	North Rhine-Westphalia	1,965,723	▲2.1%
15	Weeze	NRN	Weeze	North Rhine-Westphalia	1,807,543	▼27.3%
16	Dresden	DRS	Dresden / Klotzsche	Saxony	1,756,459	▲0.1%
17	Karlsruhe/Baden-Baden	FKB	Karlsruhe / Baden-Baden	Baden-Württemberg	983,451	▼7.2%
18	Münster/Osnabrück	FMO	Münster / Osnabrück	North Rhine-Westphalia	894,390	▲4.7%
19	Paderborn	PAD	Paderborn / Lippstadt	North Rhine-Westphalia	763,872	▼3.9%
20	Memmingen	FMM	Memmingen	Bavaria	750,334	▼8.9%
21	Friedrichshafen	FDH	Friedrichshafen	Baden-Württemberg	591,343	▲10.3%
22	Saarbrücken	SCN	Saarbrücken	Saarland	398,128	▼1.8%
23	Erfurt/Weimar	ERF	Erfurt	Thuringia	226,586	▲5.4%
24	Rostock	RLG	Rostock	Mecklenburg-Vorpommern	169,946	▼4.2%

== 2013 ==
Rank	Airport	IATA	City/metro area	State	Passengers	Change 2012-2013
1	Frankfurt	FRA	Frankfurt / Rhine-Main	Hesse	58,036,948	▲0.9%
2	Munich	MUC	Munich	Bavaria	38,672,644	▲0.8%
3	Düsseldorf	DUS	Düsseldorf / Rhine-Ruhr	North Rhine-Westphalia	21,228,226	▲1.9%
4	Berlin Tegel	TXL	Berlin	Berlin	19,591,838	▲7.9%
5	Hamburg	HAM	Hamburg	Hamburg	13,502,553	▼1.4%
6	Stuttgart	STR	Stuttgart	Baden-Württemberg	9,577,551	▼1.5%
7	Cologne/Bonn	CGN	Cologne, Bonn / Rhine-Ruhr	North Rhine-Westphalia	9,077,346	▼2.2%
8	Berlin Schönefeld	SXF	Berlin, Potsdam	Brandenburg	6,727,306	▼5.2%
9	Hanover	HAJ	Hanover	Lower Saxony	5,234,909	▼1.0%
10	Nuremberg	NUE	Nuremberg	Bavaria	3,309,629	▼8.0%
11	Hahn	HHN	Hahn	Rhineland-Palatinate	2,667,402	▼4.4%
12	Bremen	BRE	Bremen	Bremen	2,612,627	▲6.8%
13	Weeze	NRN	Weeze	North Rhine-Westphalia	2,487,843	▲12.7%
14	Leipzig/Halle	LEJ	Leipzig / Halle	Saxony	2,234,231	▼2.0%
15	Dortmund	DTM	Dortmund	North Rhine-Westphalia	1,924,386	▲1.2%
16	Dresden	DRS	Dresden / Klotzsche	Saxony	1,754,139	▼7.0%
17	Baden Airpark	FKB	Karlsruhe / Baden-Baden	Baden-Württemberg	1,059,227	▼17.7%
18	Münster Osnabrück	FMO	Münster / Osnabrück	North Rhine-Westphalia	853,904	▼16.4%
19	Paderborn	PAD	Paderborn / Lippstadt	North Rhine-Westphalia	794,889	▼9.0%
20	Memmingen	FMM	Memmingen	Bavaria	838,969	▲9.7%
21	Friedrichshafen	FDH	Friedrichshafen	Baden-Württemberg	536,029	▼1.7%
22	Saarbrücken	SCN	Saarbrücken	Saarland	405,265	▼4.7%
23	Zweibrücken	ZQW	Zweibrücken	Rhineland-Palatinate	220,740	▲9.1%
24	Erfurt	ERF	Erfurt	Thuringia	214,948	▲16.8%
25	Rostock	RLG	Rostock	Mecklenburg-Vorpommern	177,464	▼13.0%

== 2012 ==
Rank	Airport	IATA	City/metro area	State	Passengers	Change 2011-2012
1	Frankfurt	FRA	Frankfurt / Rhine-Main	Hesse	57,520,001	▲1.9%
2	Munich	MUC	Munich	Bavaria	38,360,604	▲1.6%
3	Düsseldorf	DUS	Düsseldorf / Rhine-Ruhr	North Rhine-Westphalia	20,833,246	▲2.4%
4	Berlin Tegel	TXL	Berlin	Berlin	18,164,023	▲7.4%
5	Hamburg	HAM	Hamburg	Hamburg	13,697,402	▲1%
6	Stuttgart	STR	Stuttgart	Baden-Württemberg	9,720,877	▲1.4%
7	Cologne/Bonn	CGN	Cologne, Bonn / Rhine-Ruhr	North Rhine-Westphalia	9,280,070	▼3.6%
8	Berlin Schönefeld	SXF	Berlin, Potsdam	Brandenburg	7,097,274	▼0.2%
9	Hanover	HAJ	Hanover	Lower Saxony	5,287,831	▼1%
10	Nuremberg	NUE	Nuremberg	Bavaria	3,597,136	▼9.2%
11	Hahn	HHN	Hahn	Rhineland-Palatinate	2,790,961	▼3.6%
12	Bremen	BRE	Bremen	Bremen	2,447,007	▼4.4%
13	Leipzig/Halle	LEJ	Leipzig / Halle	Saxony	2,279,221	▲0.7%
14	Weeze	NRN	Weeze	North Rhine-Westphalia	2,208,429	▼8.8%
15	Dortmund	DTM	Dortmund	North Rhine-Westphalia	1,902,133	▲4.4%
16	Dresden	DRS	Dresden / Klotzsche	Saxony	1,886,425	▼1.6%
17	Baden Airpark	FKB	Karlsruhe / Baden-Baden	Baden-Württemberg	1,287,382	▲15.5%
18	Münster Osnabrück	FMO	Münster / Osnabrück	North Rhine-Westphalia	1,020,917	▼22.9%
19	Paderborn	PAD	Paderborn / Lippstadt	North Rhine-Westphalia	873,244	▼10.4%
20	Memmingen	FMM	Memmingen	Bavaria	869,937	▲13.7%
21	Friedrichshafen	FDH	Friedrichshafen	Baden-Württemberg	545,121	▼4.7%
22	Saarbrücken	SCN	Saarbrücken	Saarland	425,429	▼5.9%
23	Rostock	RLG	Rostock	Mecklenburg-Vorpommern	203,990	▼8.7%
24	Erfurt	ERF	Erfurt	Thuringia	183,999	▼34.5%

== 2011 ==
Rank	Airport	IATA	City/metro area	State	Passengers	Change 2010-2011
1	Frankfurt Airport	FRA	Frankfurt / Rhine-Main	Hesse	56,436,255	▲6.5%
2	Munich Airport	MUC	Munich	Bavaria	37,763,701	▲8.8%
3	Düsseldorf	DUS	Düsseldorf / Rhine-Ruhr	North Rhine-Westphalia	20,339,466	▲7.1%
4	Berlin Tegel Airport	TXL	Berlin	Berlin	16,919,820	▲12.6%
5	Hamburg Airport	HAM	Hamburg	Hamburg	13,558,261	▲4.6%
6	Cologne/Bonn Airport	CGN	Cologne, Bonn / Rhine-Ruhr	North Rhine-Westphalia	9,623,398	▼2.3%
7	Stuttgart Airport	STR	Stuttgart	Baden-Württemberg	9,582,265	▲4.0%
8	Berlin Schönefeld Airport	SXF	Berlin, Potsdam	Brandenburg	7,113,989	▼2.5%
9	Hanover Airport	HAJ	Hanover	Lower Saxony	5,340,264	▲5.5%
10	Nuremberg Airport	NUE	Nuremberg	Bavaria	3,962,617	▼2.6%
11	Frankfurt-Hahn Airport	HHN	Hahn	Rhineland-Palatinate	2,894,109	▼17.2%
12	Bremen Airport	BRE	Bremen	Bremen	2,560,023	▼4.3%
13	Weeze Airport	NRN	Weeze	North Rhine-Westphalia	2,421,108	▼16.4%
14	Leipzig/Halle Airport	LEJ	Leipzig / Halle	Saxony	2,263,668	▼3.6%
15	Dresden Airport	DRS	Dresden / Klotzsche	Saxony	1,917,915	▲4.1%
16	Dortmund Airport	DTM	Dortmund	North Rhine-Westphalia	1,822,066	▲4.3%
17	Münster Osnabrück Airport	FMO	Münster / Osnabrück	North Rhine-Westphalia	1,323,689	▼0.7%
18	Baden Airpark	FKB	Karlsruhe / Baden-Baden	Baden-Württemberg	1,114,535	▼5.3%
19	Paderborn Lippstadt Airport	PAD	Paderborn / Lippstadt	North Rhine-Westphalia	974,775	▼5.2%
20	Memmingen Airport	FMM	Memmingen	Bavaria	764,782	▼16.1%
21	Friedrichshafen Airport	FDH	Friedrichshafen	Baden-Württemberg	571,709	▼3.2%
22	Rostock Airport	RLG	Rostock	Mecklenburg-Vorpommern	223,516	▲1.8%

== 2010 ==
Rank	Airport	IATA	City/metro area	State	Passengers	Change 2009-2010
1	Frankfurt Airport	FRA	Frankfurt / Rhine-Main	Hesse	53,009,221	▲4.1%
2	Munich Airport	MUC	Munich	Bavaria	34,721,605	▲6.2%
3	Düsseldorf	DUS	Düsseldorf / Rhine-Ruhr	North Rhine-Westphalia	18,988,149	▲6.7%
4	Berlin Tegel Airport	TXL	Berlin	Berlin	15,025,600	▲6.0%
5	Hamburg Airport	HAM	Hamburg	Hamburg	12,962,429	▲6.0%
6	Cologne/Bonn Airport	CGN	Cologne, Bonn / Rhine-Ruhr	North Rhine-Westphalia	9,849,779	▲1.1%
7	Stuttgart Airport	STR	Stuttgart	Baden-Württemberg	9,218,095	▲3.2%
8	Berlin Schönefeld Airport	SXF	Berlin, Potsdam	Brandenburg	7,297,911	▲7.4%
9	Hanover Airport	HAJ	Hanover	Lower Saxony	5,059,800	▲1.8%
10	Nuremberg Airport	NUE	Nuremberg	Bavaria	4,068,799	▲2.6%
11	Frankfurt-Hahn Airport	HHN	Hahn	Rhineland-Palatinate	3,438,298	▼7.9%
12	Weeze Airport	NRN	Weeze	North Rhine-Westphalia	2,896,999	▲20.5%
13	Bremen Airport	BRG	Bremen	Bremen	2,676,297	▲9.2%
14	Leipzig/Halle Airport	LEJ	Leipzig / Halle	Saxony	2,348,597	▼3.1%
15	Dresden Airport	DRS	Dresden / Klotzsche	Saxony	1,847,166	▲7.2%
16	Dortmund Airport	DTM	Dortmund	North Rhine-Westphalia	1,740,642	▲1.4%
17	Münster Osnabrück Airport	FMO	Münster / Osnabrück	North Rhine-Westphalia	1,337,879	▼4.3%
18	Baden Airpark	FKB	Karlsruhe / Baden-Baden	Baden-Württemberg	1,192,894	▲8.2%
19	Paderborn Lippstadt Airport	PAD	Paderborn / Lippstadt	North Rhine-Westphalia	1,030,802	▲4.7%

== See also ==
- List of airports in Germany
