= Karlsruhe/Baden-Baden Airport =

Airport in Baden-Württemberg, Germany

Karlsruhe/Baden-Baden Airport Flughafen Karlsruhe/Baden-Baden

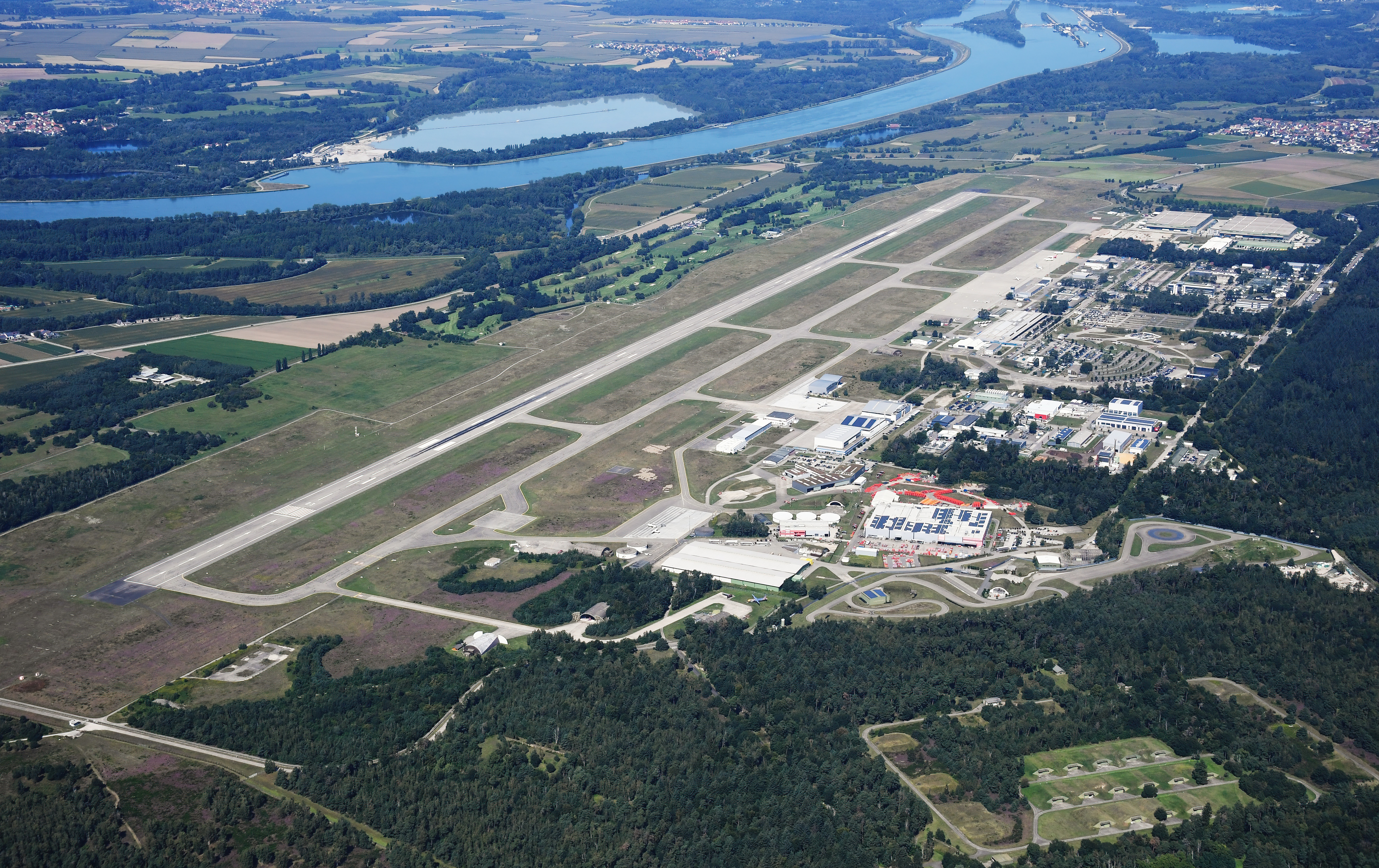
- IATA: FKB; ICAO: EDSB

Summary
- Airport type: Public
- Operator: Baden-Airpark GmbH
- Serves: Karlsruhe and Baden-Baden
- Location: Rheinmünster, Baden-Württemberg, Germany
- Focus city for: Ryanair
- Elevation AMSL: 408 ft (124 m)
- Coordinates: 48°46′46″N 008°04′50″E
- Website: Official website

Map
- Location within Baden-Württemberg Location within Germany

Runways
Direction	Length		Surface
Direction	m	ft	Surface
03/21	3,060	10,040	Asphalt

Helipads
Number	Length		Surface
Number	m	ft	Surface
H1			Asphalt

Statistics (2025)
- Passengers: 2,257,542 ▲+25,3%
- Aircraft movements: 47,789 ▲+13,9%
- Cargo (metric tons): 1,516 ▼-1,1%
- Sources: Statistics at ADV., AIP at German air traffic control.

Karlsruhe/Baden-Baden Airport (IATA: FKB, ICAO: EDSB) (German: Flughafen Karlsruhe/Baden-Baden) is the international airport of Karlsruhe, the third-largest city in the German state of Baden-Württemberg, and also serves the spa town of Baden-Baden. It is the state's second-largest airport after Stuttgart Airport, and the 12th-largest in Germany with 2,257,542 passengers as of 2025 and mostly serves low-cost and leisure flights.

The airport itself is part of Baden Airpark, a business park with numerous other tenants. It is located in Rheinmünster, 40 km (25 mi) south of Karlsruhe, 12 km (7.5 mi) west of Baden-Baden, 25 km (16 mi) east of Haguenau and 25 km (16 mi) north of Strasbourg, France.

== History ==
=== Early years as a military airport ===
The construction of a military airfield began in December 1951 in the Upper Rhine Plain between the Black Forest and the Rhine River under the supervision of the French Air Force. The runway and associated facilities were completed by June 1952. The airfield was granted to Canadian forces and became a military base, RCAF Station Baden–Soellingen, later renamed CFB Baden–Soellingen, from 1953 until 1994.

The newly founded Baden Airpark GmbH took over the former military airfield to develop it into a regional airport and business park. Technically, the airport itself today is part of the Baden Airpark, which also includes business facilities.

=== Public operations ===
The first commercial flight from Hapag-Lloyd Flug (now TUI fly Deutschland) took place in April 2001 with service to Palma de Mallorca and Ibiza. In 2008 the airport counted over one million passengers within a year for the first time.

On 25 October 2011, Ryanair announced it would open its 47th base at Karlsruhe/Baden-Baden in March 2012 with two based aircraft and 20 routes. In addition to Ryanair's then existing 12 routes Ryanair opened seven additional routes to Faro, Málaga, Palma, Riga, Thessaloniki, Vilnius and Zadar. In July 2018, TUI fly Deutschland announced that it would terminate its operations at the airport, cancelling seven year-round and seasonal leisure routes to the Canaries and the Mediterranean.

Since March 2025, Ryanair has stationed a fourth aircraft at Karlsruhe/Baden-Baden airport.

== Facilities ==
=== Terminal ===
Karlsruhe/Baden-Baden Airport consists of one passenger terminal building equipped with 20 check-in counters and eight departure gates as well as some shops and restaurants.

=== Runway ===
The apron features eight aircraft stands of which most can be used by mid-sized aircraft such as the Boeing 737. Due to the location of the terminal building walk stands and buses are used for boarding. Due to its extensive runway and facilities, Karlsruhe/Baden-Baden Airport is frequently used by major airlines for training flights.

== Airlines and destinations ==
The following airlines operate regular scheduled and charter flights at Karlsruhe/Baden-Baden Airport:

Airlines	Destinations
Corendon Airlines	Seasonal: Antalya
Enter Air	Seasonal charter: Fuerteventura, Gran Canaria, Heraklion, Kos, Palma de Mallorca, Rhodos
Eurowings	Palma de Mallorca
Freebird Airlines	Seasonal: Antalya
Ryanair	Agadir, Alicante, Amman–Queen Alia, Banja Luka, Bari, Bucharest–Băneasa, Faro, Fès, Girona, Gran Canaria, London–Stansted, Málaga, Marrakesh, Palma de Mallorca, Porto, Rabat, Seville, Sofia, Stockholm–Arlanda, Tangier, Tenerife–South, Thessaloniki, Tirana, Trapani, Valencia, Zagreb; Seasonal: Cagliari, Corfu, Dubrovnik, Lamezia Terme, Palermo, Sarajevo, Zadar
Wizz Air	Belgrade, Brașov (begins 18 December 2026), Podgorica, Pristina, Sibiu, Skopje, Suceava, Timișoara, Tirana, Tuzla (resumes 24 March 2027)

The closest other international airport is Stuttgart Airport, located approximately 100 km (62 mi) to the east.

== Statistics ==
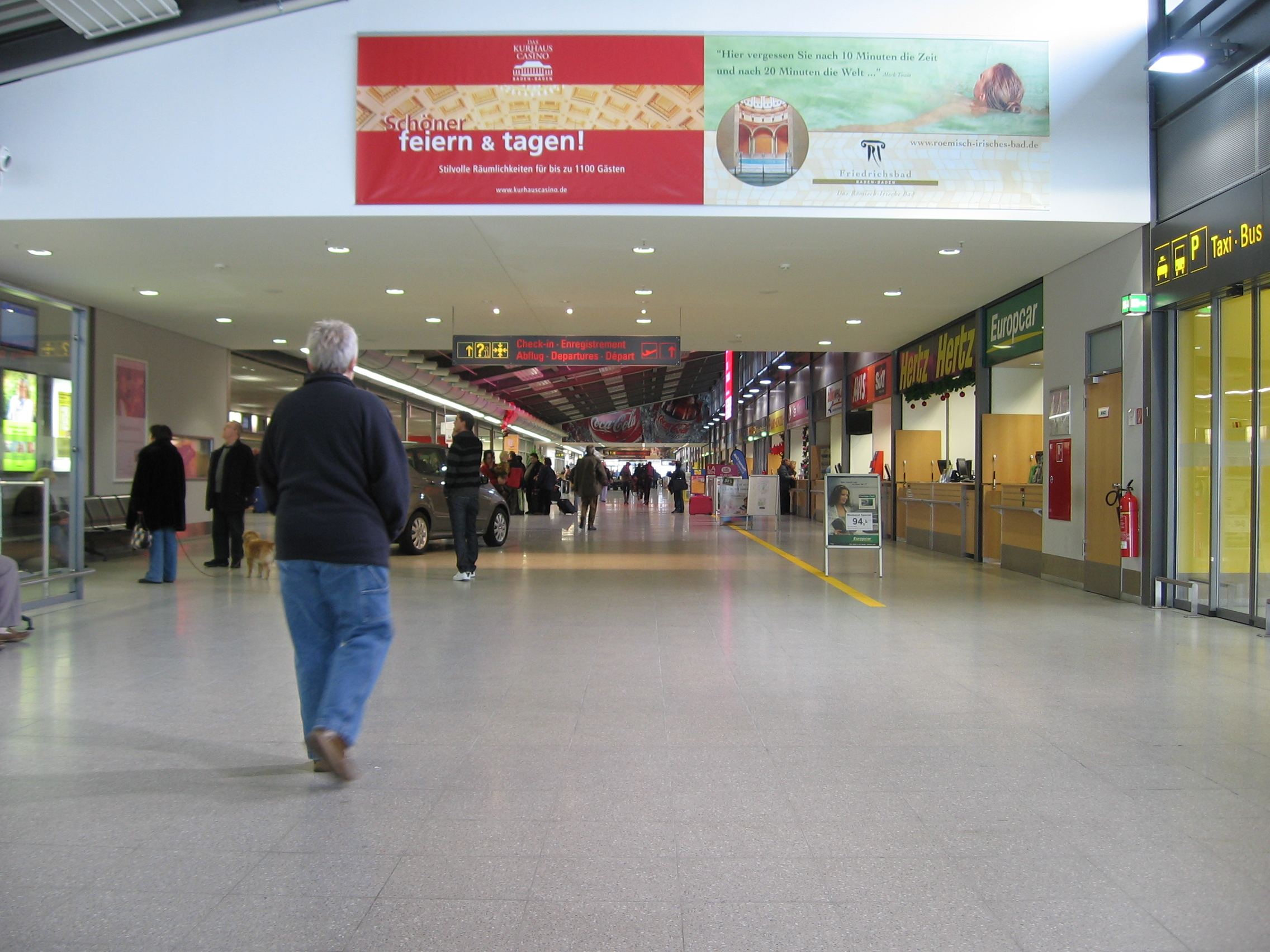
Landside area inside the terminal

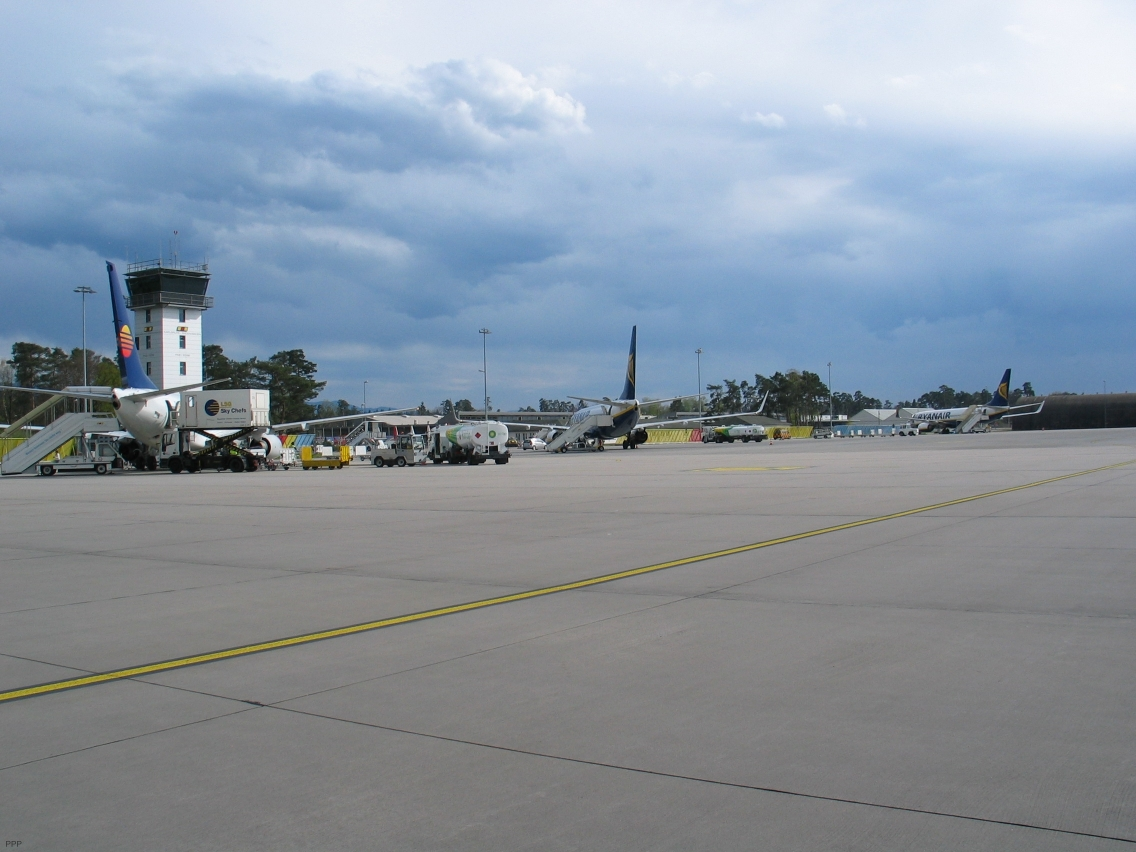
Apron overview

	Passengers
2008	1,141,070
2009	▼1,087,909
2010	▲1,177,201
2011	▼1,114,535
2012	▲1,287,382
2013	▼1,059,227
2014	▼983,451
2015	▲1,051,435
2016	▲1,105,103
2017	▲1,240,551
2018	▲1,246,969
2019	_{▲} 1,335,957
2020	▼401,000
2021	▲609,459
2022	_{▲} 1,301,002
2023	_{▲} 1,731,055
2024	_{▲} 1,800,355
2025	_{▲} 2,257,542
Source: ADV

== Ground transportation ==
The airport can be reached via motorway A5 which leads from Hesse to Basel (Exit Baden-Baden). There are local bus connections to Baden-Baden and Rastatt as well as their respective train stations.

== See also ==
- Transport in Germany
- List of airports in Germany
