= Braunschweig Wolfsburg Airport =

Braunschweig Wolfsburg Airport Flughafen Braunschweig-Wolfsburg
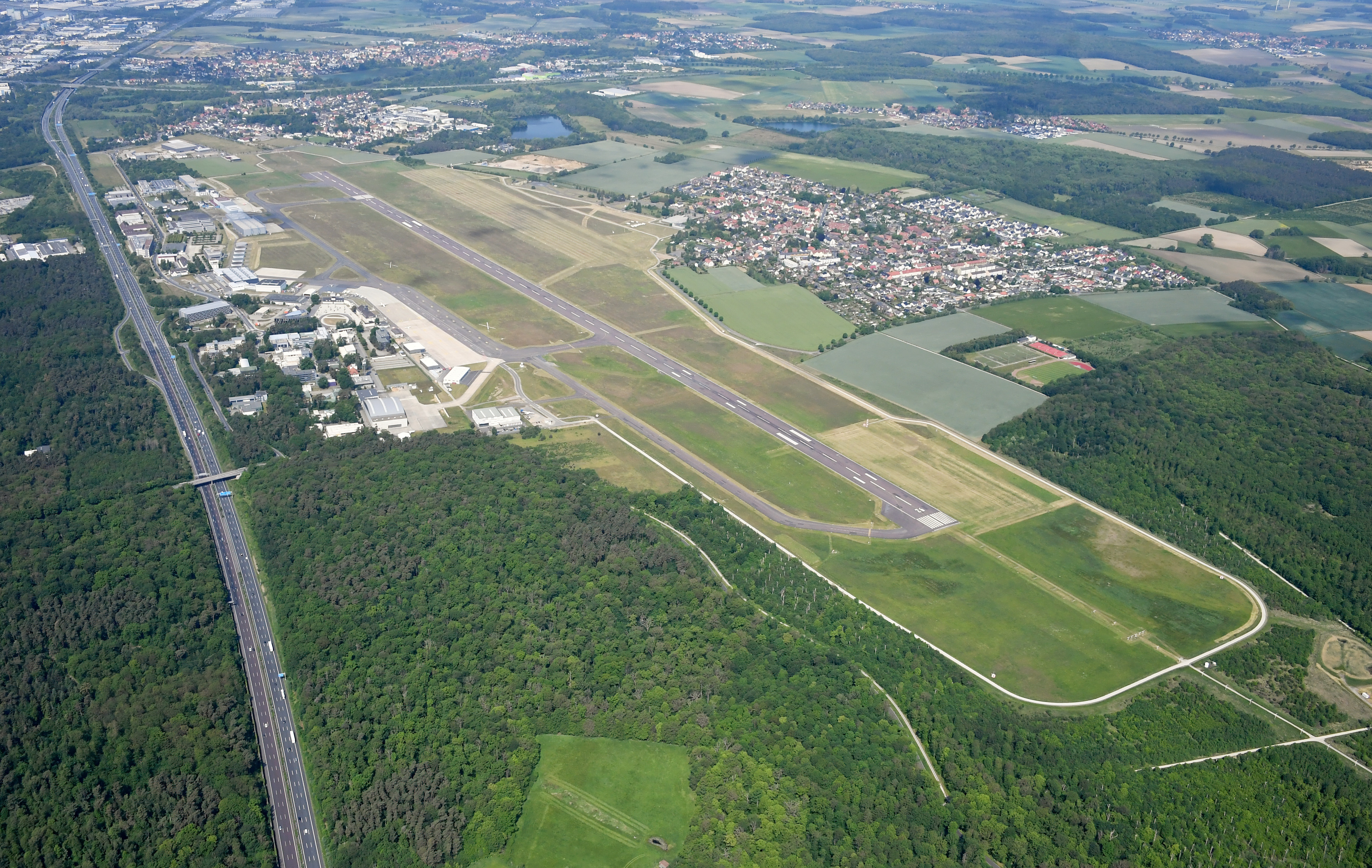
- IATA: BWE; ICAO: EDVE

Summary
- Airport type: Public / Private
- Operator: Airport Braunschweig-Wolfsburg GmbH
- Serves: Braunschweig and Wolfsburg
- Focus city for: Volkswagen Air Services
- Elevation AMSL: 295 ft / 90 m
- Coordinates: 52°19′09″N 010°33′19″E
- Website: fhbwe.de

Map
- Location of the airport in Lower Saxony

Runways
Direction	Length		Surface
Direction	m	ft	Surface
08/26	2,300	7,546	Asphalt
08R/26L	900	2,953	Grass

Statistics (2023)
- Passengers: 63,361 ▲+46,3%
- Aircraft movements: 27,930 ▲+0,4%
- Cargo (metric tons): 1 ▼ -3,4%
- Source: ADV; AIP at German air traffic control.

Braunschweig Wolfsburg Airport (German: Flughafen Braunschweig-Wolfsburg) (IATA: BWE, ICAO: EDVE) is an airport in Braunschweig, Germany. Originally constructed by the German Air Ministry in the 1930s, it is located on the northern edge of Braunschweig, which is situated between Hanover and Magdeburg. Braunschweig Airport traditionally has been a major centre of gliding in Germany and is also used for general aviation, especially business traffic.

The headquarters of the German Federal Aviation Office, the Luftfahrt-Bundesamt are located at Braunschweig-Wolfsburg Airport. Also, the Braunschweig University of Technology has some of its aeronautical departments on site.

== Infrastructure ==
Its main runway is 2,300 metres (7,546 ft) long and 30 metres (98 ft) wide. It also has a parallel grass runway of 900 metres (2,953 ft) by 30 m.

In May 2009 the extension of the runway from 1,680 metres (5,512 ft) to 2,300 metres (7,546 ft) had received its final legal go-ahead. Some €38 million were envisaged for the airport upgrade. Despite strong resistance from local action groups, both Volkswagen and DLR pushed forward with the project in order to be able to use bigger than regional jets under all weather conditions in the future. While the DLR will fly a research Airbus A320 within their flight control and supervision programme from the airport, Volkswagen intends to utilise narrow body aircraft on its business routes instead of its current regional aircraft types. No plans to intensify commercial traffic from and to the airport have been made public yet.

In the immediate vicinity of the airport, a research car park was built, which gives the opportunity to explore autonomous parking.

== Airlines and destinations ==
There are no scheduled public passenger or cargo services at the airport, which is used for unscheduled traffic with business jets, as well as by the German Aerospace Center, e.g., with their special mission aeroplanes to discover phenomena in the atmosphere. There are also ad hoc charter flights to leisure destinations.

The nearest operating airport is Hannover Airport, located about 70 km (43 mi) north west of Braunschweig Wolfsburg Airport.

The car manufacturer Volkswagen Group, which is based in nearby Wolfsburg, is a major shareholder, and uses the airfield as home base for their own airline fleet operated by Volkswagen Air Services. Volkswagen AG operates regular services to other European sites of the company and its subsidiaries, such as Škoda, Audi and SEAT.

== See also ==
- Transport in Germany
- List of airports in Germany
