= Paderborn Lippstadt Airport =

Paderborn Lippstadt Airport Flughafen Paderborn Lippstadt

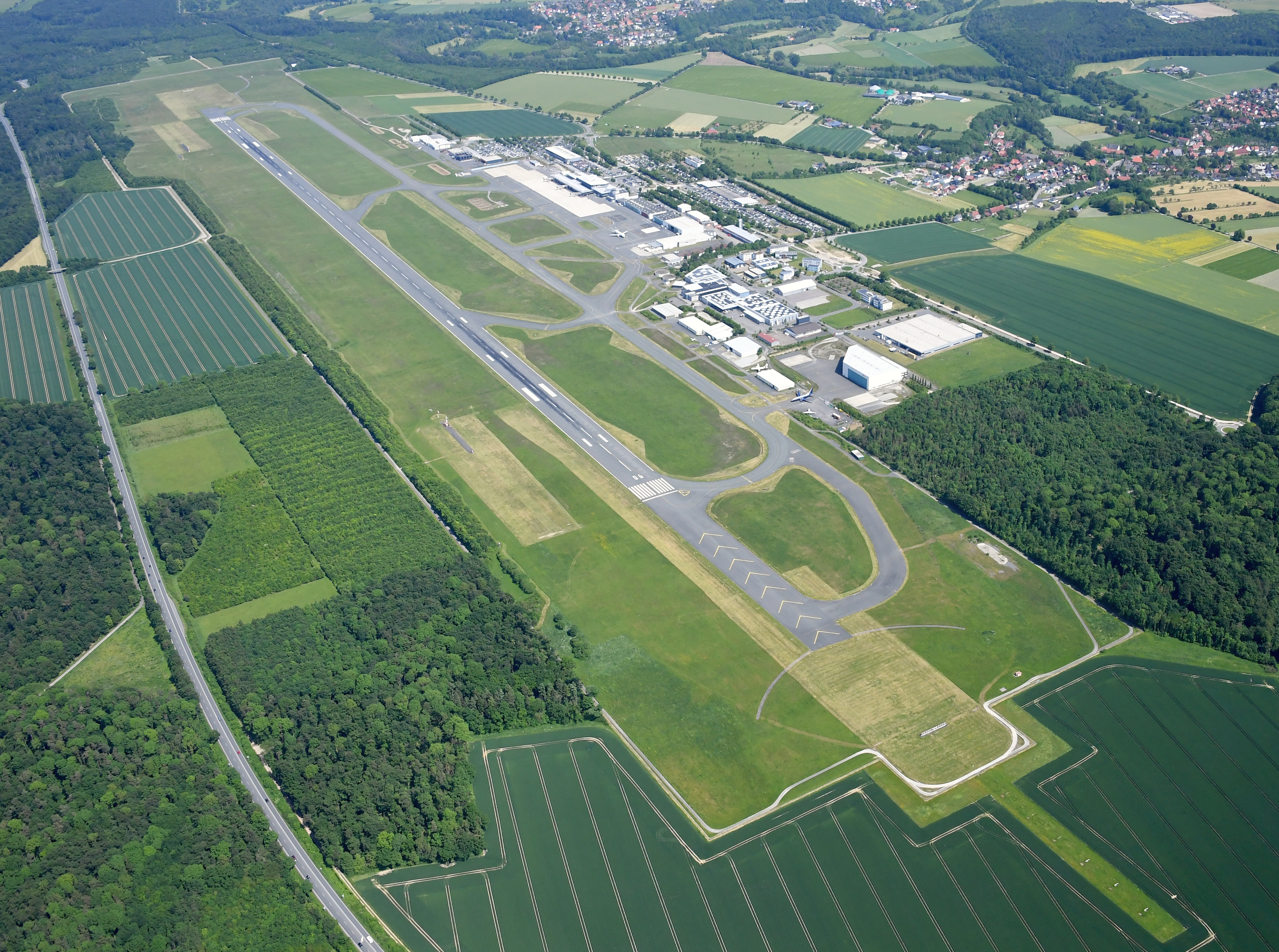
- IATA: PAD; ICAO: EDLP

Summary
- Airport type: Public
- Operator: Flughafen Paderborn/Lippstadt GmbH
- Serves: Paderborn and Lippstadt
- Location: Büren, Germany
- Opened: 1971; 55 years ago
- Elevation AMSL: 699 ft (213 m)
- Coordinates: 51°36′55″N 008°37′02″E
- Website: airport-paderborn.com

Map
- Location of Airport in North Rhine-Westphalia

Runways
Direction	Length		Surface
Direction	ft	m	Surface
06/24	7,169	2,180	Asphalt

Statistics (2024)
- Passengers: 815,976 ▲+12,8%
- Aircraft movements: 37,002 ▼-1,6%
- Cargo (metric tons): 93 ▼-27,0%
- Sources: Statistics at ADV. AIP at German air traffic control.

Paderborn Lippstadt Airport (German: Flughafen Paderborn Lippstadt) (IATA: PAD, ICAO: EDLP) is a minor international airport in the Ostwestfalen-Lippe area in the German state of North Rhine-Westphalia. Despite its name, the airport is actually located near the town of Büren, around 18 km (11 mi) from Paderborn city centre. It mainly serves flights to European leisure destinations.

== History ==
The airport company was founded in 1969, the actual Paderborn Lippstadt Airport opened in 1971.

In 2010, 1.03 million passed through the airport. Ever since, passenger numbers have been decreasing. In September 2015, German leisure airline Condor announced the termination of all operations at Paderborn Lippstadt Airport. All ten year-round and seasonal routes to destinations around the Mediterranean ceased by 26 October 2015.

In January 2019, Adria Airways announced it would end its short-lived operations at the airport which consisted of routes to London (which already ceased in late 2018), Vienna and Zürich. In October 2019, Lufthansa announced the termination of their route to Frankfurt Airport by March 2020, leaving Paderborn/Lippstadt with a sole hub connection to Munich Airport.

In August 2020, the airport company announced its intention to file for insolvency while maintaining business operations in the wake of the COVID-19 pandemic.

In 2024, the airport celebrated its 55th anniversary. In November 2024, Lufthansa announced it would end the airport's sole remaining hub connection to Munich in March 2025.

== Facilities ==
The terminal offers several facilities for travelers: travel agencies, a restaurant, shops, car rental agencies and a visitors deck. The apron features five stands for mid-sized aircraft such as the Airbus A320 of which three are equipped with jet bridges. There are also several stands for smaller general aviation aircraft.

A conference centre with several conference rooms can be found at the airport and a hotel was opened there in October 2006. An industrial park with several companies is located in the close vicinity.

== Airlines and destinations ==
The following airlines operate regular scheduled and charter flights at Paderborn Lippstadt Airport:

Airlines	Destinations
Aegean Airlines	Seasonal charter: Rhodes
Air Cairo	Seasonal: Hurghada
Air Nostrum	Seasonal charter: Palma de Mallorca
Corendon Airlines	Antalya
Eurowings	Seasonal: Palma de Mallorca
Freebird Airlines Europe	Seasonal charter: Antalya, Fuerteventura, Gran Canaria, Hurghada, Palma de Mallorca
Pegasus Airlines	Seasonal: Antalya
Ryanair	Seasonal: Alicante, Málaga, Palma de Mallorca
SunExpress	Antalya
Trade Air	Charter: Pristina

The nearest larger international airport is Düsseldorf Airport approx. 147 kilometres (91 mi) to the south west.

== Statistics ==
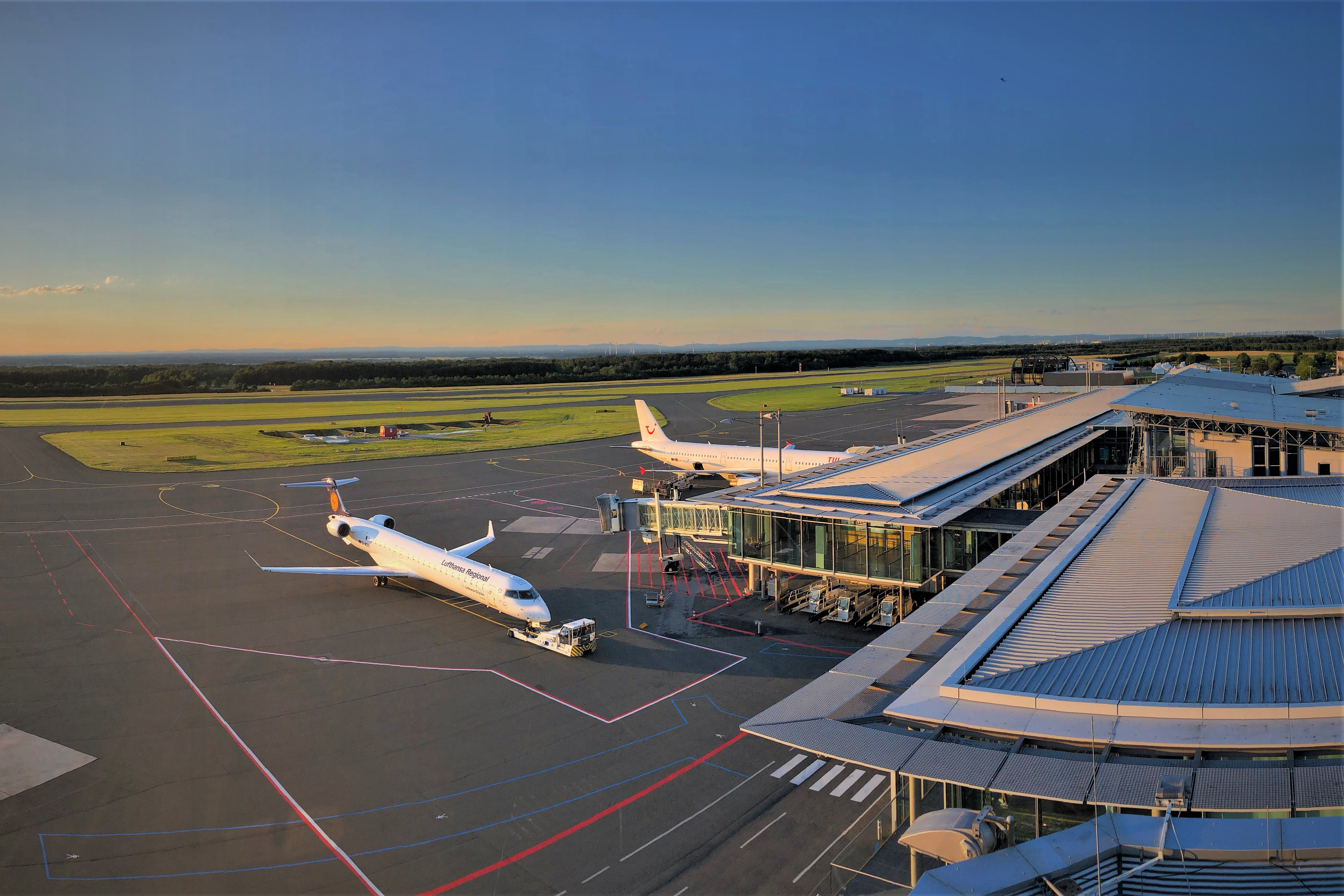
Apron view

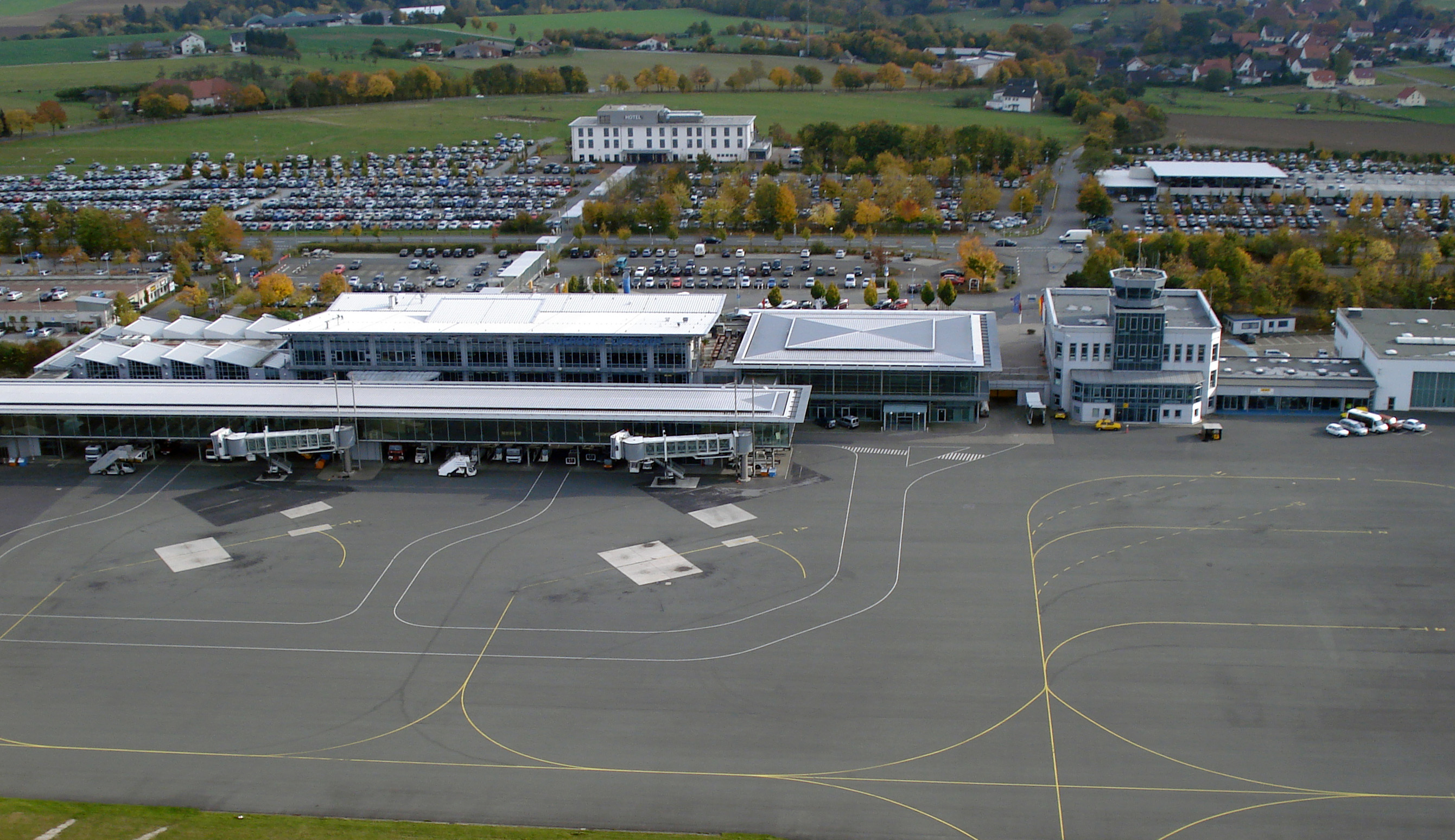
Terminal exterior

	Passengers
2008	1,137,043
2009	▼983,706
2010	▲1,028,301
2011	▼974,775
2012	▼873,244
2013	▼794,889
2014	▼760,044
2015	▲771,749
2016	▼706,268
2017	▲738,474
2018	▼736,158
2019	▼693,404
2020	▼92,574
2021	▲129,292
2022	▲502,621
2023	▲723,355
2024	▲818,378
Source: ADV

== Ground transportation ==
The airport is located next to the Autobahn A 44 (exit Büren) and can also be reached via Autobahn A 33 (exit Salzkotten). There is a bus shuttle from the main station in Paderborn.

== See also ==
- Transport in Germany
- List of airports in Germany
