= Münster Osnabrück Airport =

Münster Osnabrück Airport Flughafen Münster/Osnabrück
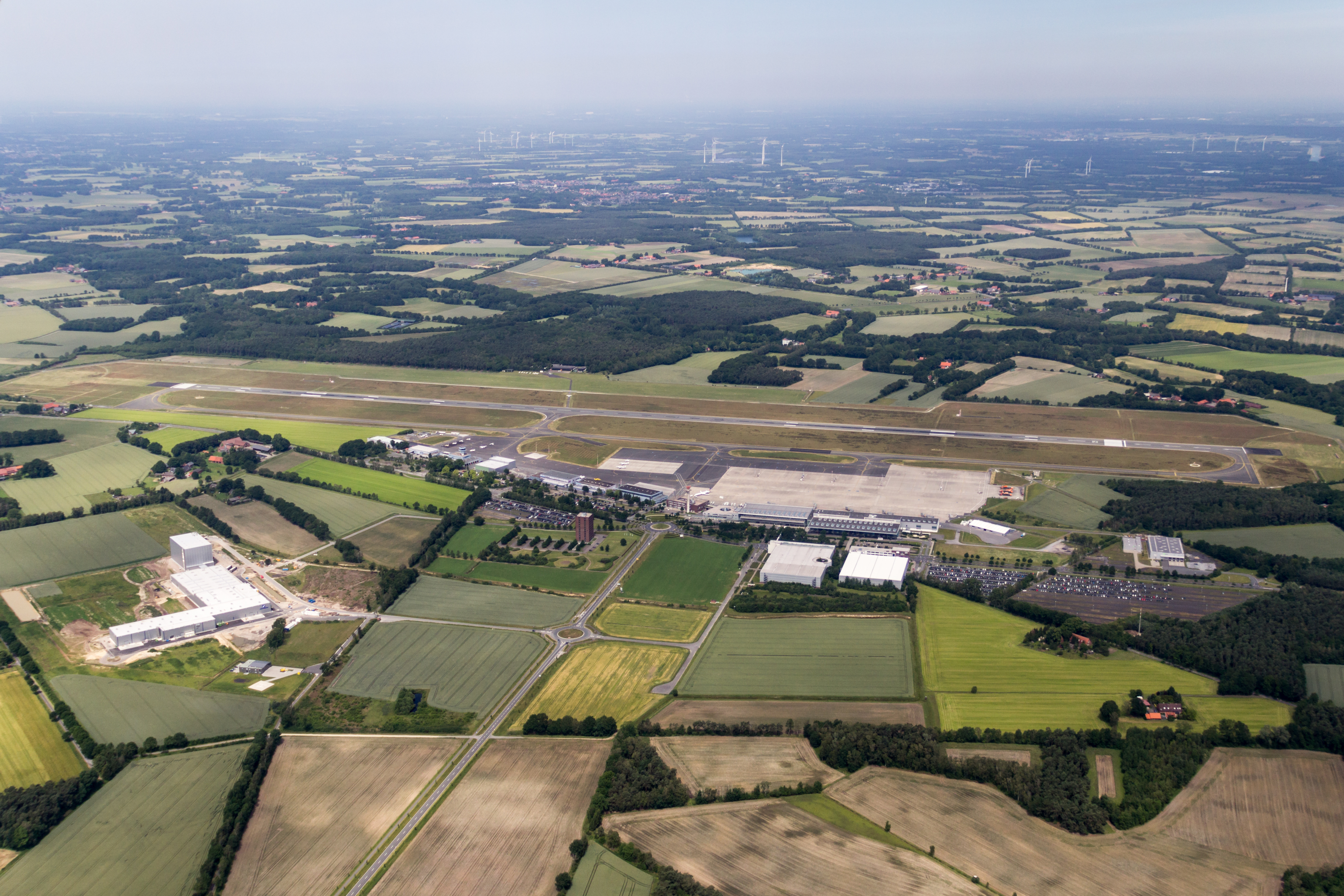
- IATA: FMO; ICAO: EDDG

Summary
- Airport type: Public
- Operator: Flughafen Münster/Osnabrück GmbH
- Serves: Münster and Osnabrück
- Location: Greven, Germany
- Elevation AMSL: 157 ft (48 m)
- Coordinates: 52°08′10″N 07°41′09″E
- Website: fmo.de

Map
- Location within North Rhine-Westphalia

Runways
Direction	Length		Surface
Direction	ft	m	Surface
07/25	7,119	2,170	Asphalt

Statistics (2024)
- Passengers: 1,283,691 ▲+29,7%
- Aircraft movements: 38,283 ▲+5,4%
- Cargo (metric tons): 40 ▼-59,4%
- Sources: Statistics at ADV. AIP at German air traffic control.

Münster Osnabrück Airport (IATA: FMO, ICAO: EDDG), formerly Münster/Osnabrück International Airport and Flughafen Münster/Osnabrück in German, is a minor international airport in the German state of North Rhine-Westphalia. It is located near Greven, 25 km (16 mi) north of Münster and 35 km (22 mi) south of Osnabrück. The airport serves the area of the northern Ruhrgebiet, western and southwestern Lower Saxony, Emsland, Westphalia and parts of the Netherlands and features flights to some European city and leisure destinations.

== History ==
=== Early years ===
On 21 December 1966, the cities of Münster, Osnabrück, and Greven as well as the districts of Münster and Tecklenburg founded the Münster/Osnabrück Airport GmbH.

In mid 1967, the German authorities approached the British Army for assistance in building an airfield to serve the Münster-Osnabrück area. An airstrip existed at Greven, but the site was heavily wooded and included one badly drained and swampy area, and the site was within a few hundred metres of the Dortmund-Ems Canal which had been bombed during World War II, and where the presence of unexploded bombs was suspected. By March 1968, it was agreed that the British Army would clear and level an area 2120 metres long between 400 and 500 metres wide and produce a base of clean sand 1520 metres long and 50 metres wide for a runway, to be used by aircraft of Trident and BAC 1-11 size. Work began in April 1968. 16 Field Squadron Royal Engineers (RE) provided the project control and RE units from all over the British Army of the Rhine (BAOR) but particularly 43 Field Support Squadron RE provided manpower and plant.

On 24 September 1968, the state of North Rhine-Westphalia received permission to begin construction. An apron and a 2,000 m (2,200 yd) long runway were built. The ground levelling was performed by BAOR.

Despite many problems, the project was completed on 30 June 1969, within a few days of the planned date. As a gesture to recognise the British Army involvement, the Germans gifted a Ka 7 glider to the regiment and gave them honorary membership in the Greven Gliding club. After five years of construction, the Münster/Osnabrück airport was officially opened on 27 March 1972.

The first charter flight from Münster/Osnabrück airport to Palma de Mallorca took place in 1973.

=== Development since 1980s ===
On 29 October 1984, British Airways started to serve the route from Berlin to Münster/Osnabrück with BAC Super One-Eleven; these were the first scheduled jet flights from the airport. Münster/Osnabrück gained the status of an international airport in 1986.

A new terminal building that could accommodate a larger number of passengers was inaugurated in 1995; the new Terminal 2 followed in 2002. The airport intended to extend the runway to 3,600 metres (11,800 feet) to attract intercontinental flights. The plan was the focus of protests from environmentalists, because the expansion would damage the Eltingmühlenbach natural area. In the first phase, the runway would be extended to 3,000 metres (9,800 feet). This would have cost around €60 million. The plan was approved in 2004. Originally, work was scheduled to begin in December 2006. However, among others, Naturschutzbund Deutschland filed a lawsuit against the expansion. In May 2011, the Higher Administrative Court in Münster decided against the expansion because of mistakes made in the Planfeststellungsverfahren which defines details of the runway expansion.

The plan to connect the airport with the Bundesautobahn 1 was realized in November 2010. The cities of Münster and Greven and the Steinfurt district planned to donate an area of around 500 acres (2.0 km^{2}) to the airport for airport-related commercial activities. This met with protests as well, because this plan would endanger the Hüttruper Heide heath.

In 2023, the airport announced a revised corporate design, subsequently dropping the name annex International.

== Facilities ==
The airport has one modern passenger terminal building, which is divided into Terminal 1 for arrivals and Terminal 2 for departures. The ground level has check-in facilities as well as travel agencies; the upper level has the airside area as well as some shops and restaurants and a visitors terrace. The apron has five aircraft stands which are equipped with jet bridges and can be used by mid-sized planes such as the Boeing 737 and Airbus 320 family up to the Boeing 757. There are also several bus-boarding stands on the apron.

== Airlines and destinations ==
The following airlines operate regular scheduled and charter flights at Münster Osnabrück International Airport:

Airlines	Destinations
Aegean	Seasonal charter: Heraklion
Condor	Gran Canaria (begins 2 November 2026), Hurghada (begins 4 November 2026); Seasonal: Chania (begins 7 May 2027), Fuerteventura (begins 2 May 2027), Heraklion (begins 1 May 2027), Lanzarote (begins 2 November 2026), Palma de Mallorca, Rhodes (begins 2 May 2027)
Corendon Airlines	Seasonal: Antalya, Heraklion
Eurowings	Palma de Mallorca
GP Aviation	Pristina
LEAV Aviation	Seasonal: Fuerteventura, Heraklion, Palma de Mallorca, Rhodes
Lufthansa	Munich
Lufthansa City Airlines	Munich
Marabu	Seasonal: Heraklion, Hurghada, Palma de Mallorca
Mavi Gök Airlines	Seasonal charter: Antalya
Nesma Airlines	Seasonal charter: Hurghada
Pegasus Airlines	Seasonal: Antalya
Red Sea Airlines	Seasonal charter: Hurghada
Ryanair	Alicante, London–Stansted, Málaga, Palma de Mallorca; Seasonal: Corfu, Zadar
SunExpress	Antalya

== Statistics ==
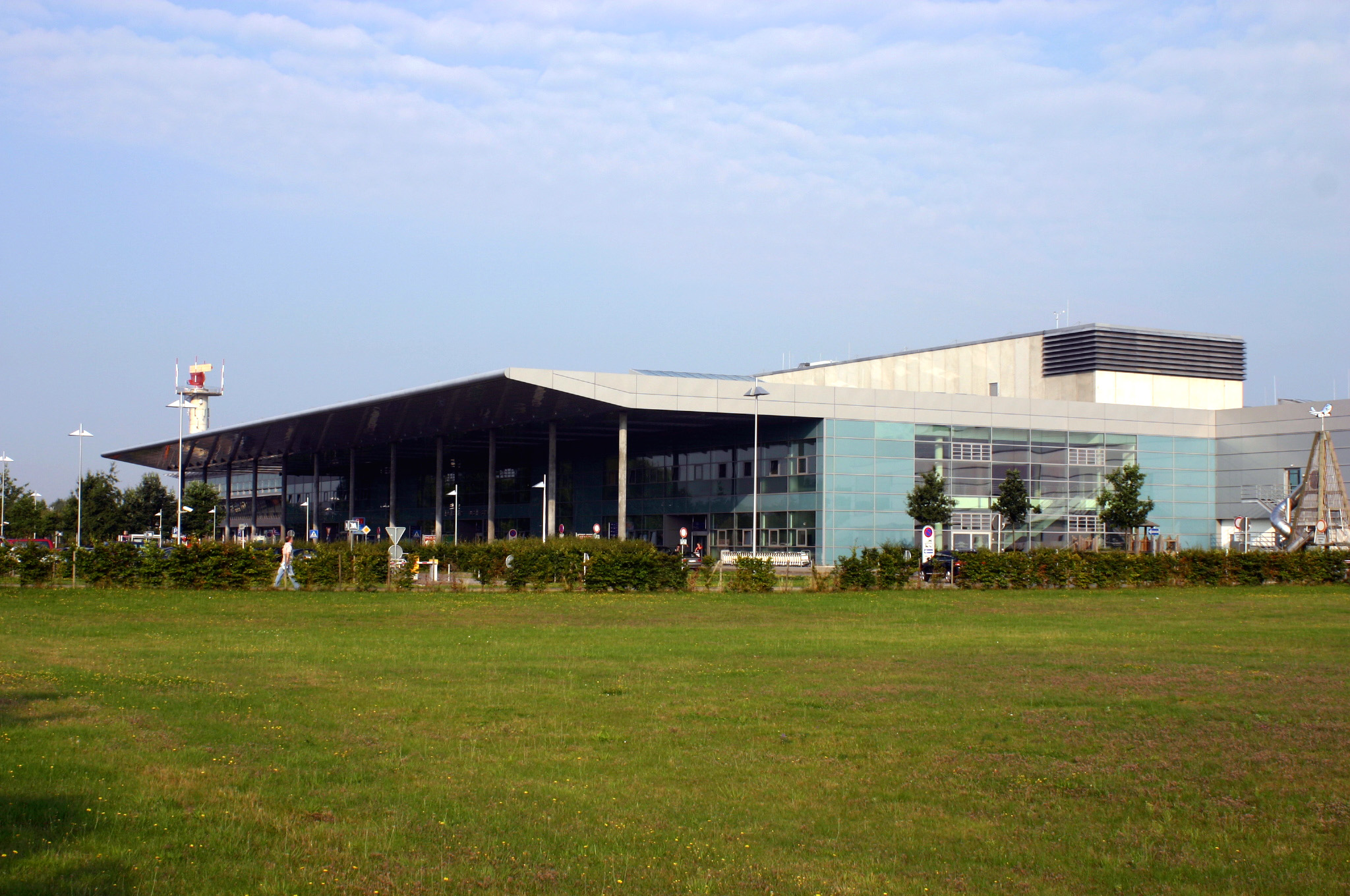
Terminal exterior

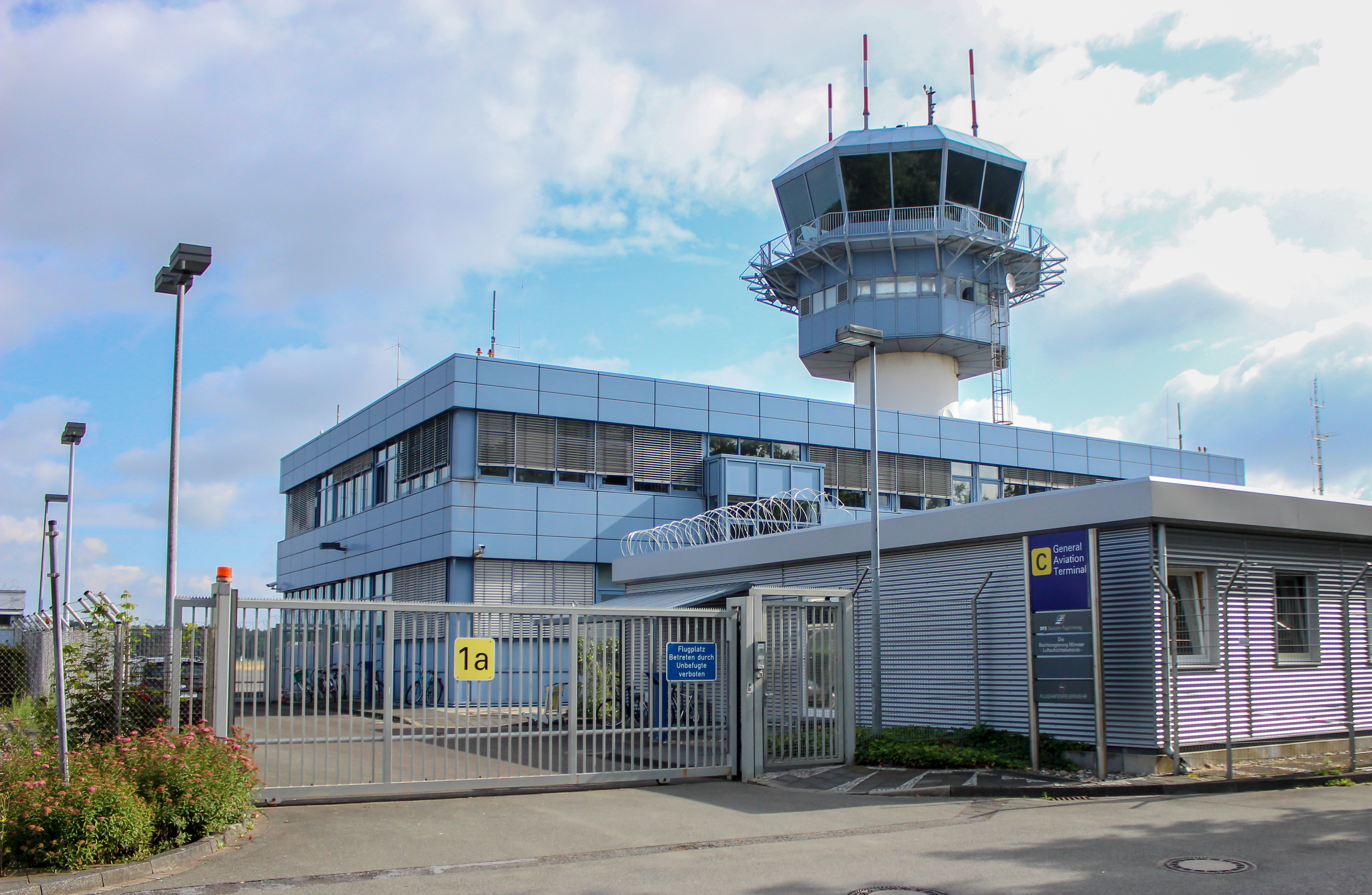
Air traffic control tower

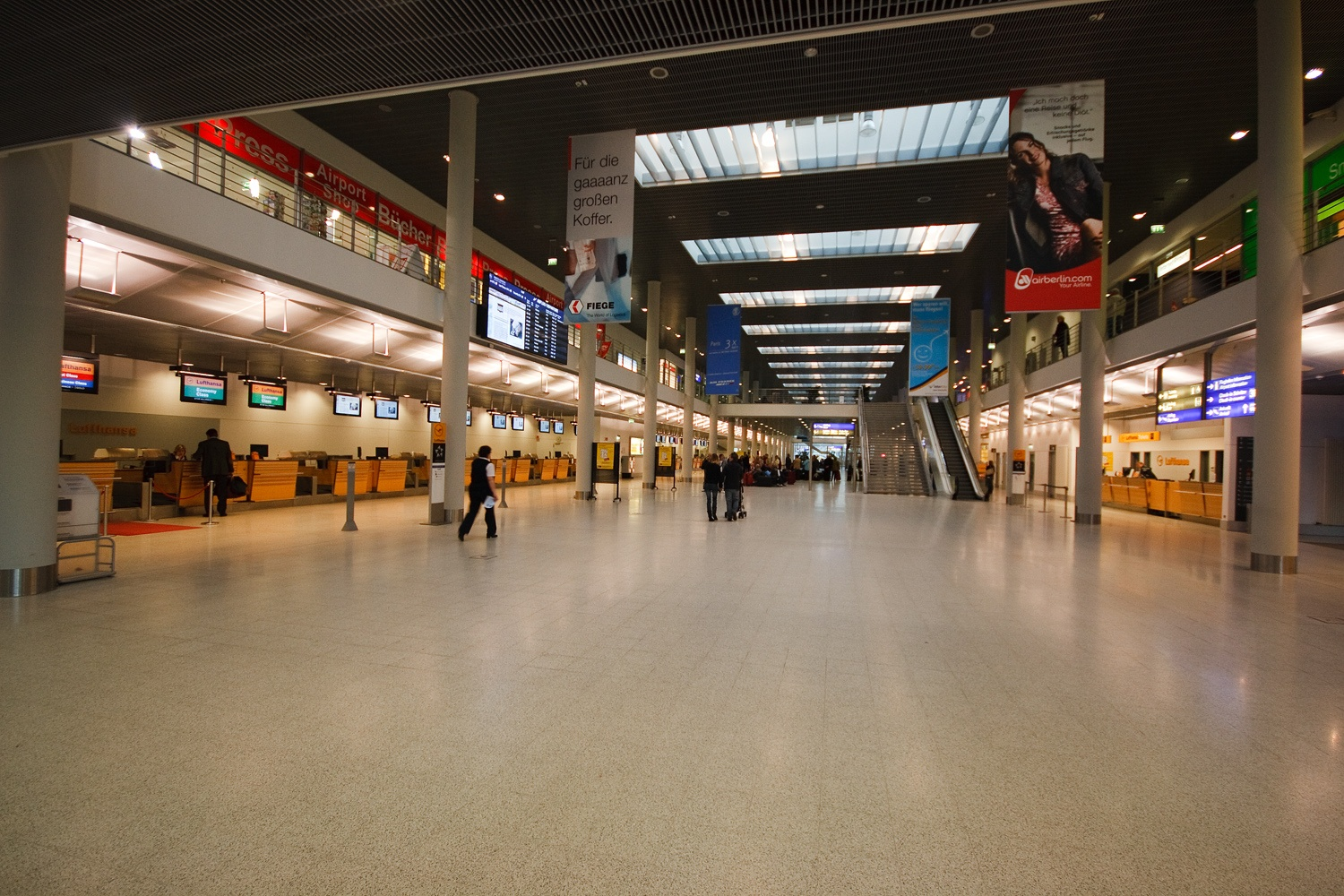
Terminal interior

Busiest Flight Routes from FMO in 2023
Rank	Destination Airport	Destination Country	Passengers
1	Palma de Mallorca	Spain	138,351
2	Antalya	Turkey	133,429
3	Munich	Germany	75,609
4	Frankfurt/Main	Germany	49,779
5	Pristina	Kosovo	20,663
6	Heraklion	Greece	14,299
7	Hurghada	Egypt	11,454
8	Las Palmas	Spain	6,952
9	Rhodes	Greece	6,825
10	Fuerteventura	Spain	6,502
11	Kos	Greece	6,200
12	Tenerife South	Spain	6,098
13	Corfu	Greece	5,903
14	Zadar	Croatia	3,974
This statistic includes only departures. (No arrivals)

Busiest Flight Routes by Country from FMO in 2023
Rank	Destination Country	Passengers
1	Spain	158,977
2	Turkey	137,655
3	Germany	126,167
4	Greece	33,233
5	Kosovo	20,663
6	Egypt	11,589
7	Croatia	4,161
This statistic includes only departures. (No arrivals)

	Passengers
2000	1,764,885
2001	▼1,607,437
2002	▼1,476,734
2003	▲1,512,786
2004	▼1,488,661
2005	▲1,540,656
2006	▲1,551,173
2007	▲1,606,425
2008	▼1,570,506
2009	▼1,382,069
2010	▼1,332,456
2011	▼1,323,689
2012	▼1,020,917
2013	▼853,904
2014	▲899,595
2015	▼817,049
2016	▼787,000
2017	▲959,493
2018	▲1,026,625
2019	▼986,260
2020	▼223,500
2021	▲362,106
2022	▲834,424
2023	▲991,471
^{Source: ADV German Airports Association}

== Ground transportation ==
=== Car ===
The airport has roughly 7500 parking spaces spread over multiple car parks, two of which are multi-storey. The airport can be reached via two motorways:

- A 1 from Bremen/Osnabrück: Exit 75 Flughafen Münster/Osnabrück
- A 30 from Amsterdam/Rheine: Exit 11b Ibbenbüren

=== Bus ===
There are several scheduled bus connections from Münster railway station and by a coach shuttle from Osnabrück. The coaches take approximately 40 minutes to get from the airport to the railway station.

== See also ==
- Transport in Germany
- List of airports in Germany
