= Dresden Airport =

Airport serving Dresden, Saxony, Germany

Dresden Airport Flughafen Dresden

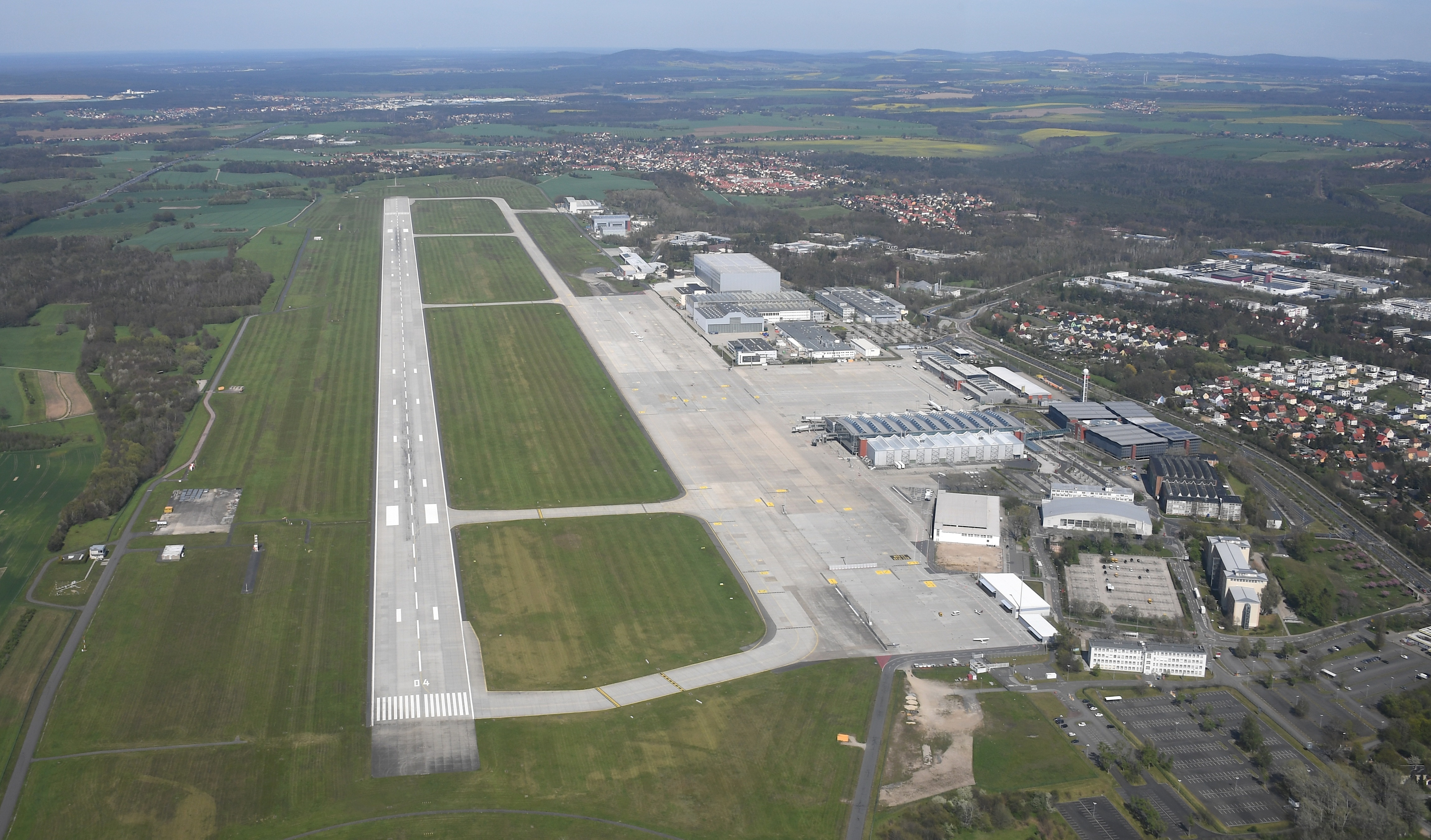
- IATA: DRS; ICAO: EDDC

Summary
- Airport type: Public
- Owner: Mitteldeutsche Airport Holding AG
- Serves: Dresden, Germany
- Opened: 11 July 1935; 91 years ago
- Elevation AMSL: 754 ft (230 m)
- Coordinates: 51°08′04″N 13°46′05″E
- Website: www.dresden-airport.de

Map
- Location of airport in Saxony

Runways
Direction	Length		Surface
Direction	m	ft	Surface
04/22	2,850	9,351	Concrete

Helipads
Number	Length		Surface
Number	m	ft	Surface
H1	30	98	Concrete/Asphalt

Statistics (2022)
- Passengers: 838,387 ▲ +155,4%
- Aircraft movements: 20,119 ▲ +39,6%
- Freight (in tons): 39 ▼ -11,3%
- Sources: Statistics at ADV., AIP at German air traffic control.

Dresden Airport (IATA: DRS, ICAO: EDDC) is an international airport of Dresden, the state capital of Saxony, Germany. It is located in Klotzsche, a district of Dresden 9 km (5.6 mi) north of the city centre. It was formerly also known in German as Flughafen Dresden-Klotzsche. Destinations from the airport include a few European cities and several holiday destinations.

Elbe Flugzeugwerke (EFW), a subsidiary of ST Engineering Aerospace and Airbus, is based at the airport. EFW is tasked with freighter conversions as well as aircraft maintenance, including the Airbus A380.

== History ==
=== Early years ===
The airport was opened to commercial traffic on 11 July 1935. Though planned as a commercial airport, its importance to the military increased dramatically during the Third Reich. During World War II it was exclusively used for military purposes. An airlift between the airport and Breslau (modern day Wrocław) was established to support German troops during the Siege of Breslau in the spring of 1945. Attempts to destroy buildings and equipment before Allied troops could occupy Dresden failed due to the resistance of civilian airport employees.

During the following years, the airport was used as an education centre for the Soviet army. It was reopened for commercial traffic on 16 June 1957. In 1959 international air traffic resumed, primarily to Eastern Bloc countries.

Between 1955 and 1961, the East German government decided to develop its own aviation industry centred on Dresden, with the VEB Flugzeugwerke Dresden ("Publicly-owned Aircraft Factories Dresden") as the main plant. Although this development ultimately failed, it increased the importance of Klotzsche Airport considerably, and still shapes the design and atmosphere of the airport today. With the end of aircraft manufacturing in 1961, the plant became the VEB Flugzeugwerft Dresden ("Publicly-owned Aircraft Maintenance Dresden"), a maintenance facility for Eastern Bloc fighter aircraft and helicopters. From 1963, the airport was also home of an East German military transport squadron with Ilyushin Il-14 and later Antonov An-26, designated as Transportfliegerstaffel 27 (TFS-27) and later Transportfliegerstaffel 24 (TFS-24, TS-24). Passenger traffic was limited to domestic routes and to a few destinations in other Eastern Bloc countries.

=== Development after German reunification ===
After German reunification, the airport was expanded and flights to western European capitals were added. Traffic increased sevenfold during the first half of the 1990s and a second terminal was opened in 1995.

In 2001 the current terminal was added. It was rebuilt from a hangar formerly used as an assembly hall by the aircraft industry.

In 2008, 1,860,364 passengers passed through the airport, an increase of 0.3% over the previous year and a record for the airport. In the same year, there were 36,968 takeoffs and landings, an increase of 2.3% over the previous year. The airport rebranded itself as "Dresden International" in September of the same year.

In February 2015, Etihad Regional terminated of all their Dresden operations (which had commenced only two years earlier) due to changes to their strategy. All three existing routes were shut down, while two planned routes were never started. In June 2015, CityJet announced the termination of their route from London City Airport to Dresden after two years, citing low demand. After the demise of Germania in early 2019, Sundair announced they would base aircraft in Dresden and fly to several former Germania leisure destinations.

In October 2024 Ryanair announced the termination of all routes at three German airports including Dresden, citing high operating costs.

== Facilities ==
The airport has one modern passenger terminal building with several shops, restaurants and service agencies as well as seven aircraft parking positions equipped with jet bridges and additional apron stands for mid-sized aircraft such as the Airbus A320.

== Airlines and destinations ==
The following airlines offer regular scheduled and charter flights at Dresden Airport:

Airlines	Destinations	Refs
Air Cairo	Seasonal: Hurghada	
Corendon Airlines	Seasonal: Antalya	
Eurowings	Düsseldorf; Seasonal: Palma de Mallorca	
FlyOne	Chișinău (begins 17 December 2026)	
Lufthansa	Frankfurt, Munich	
Pegasus Airlines	Seasonal: Antalya	
Sky Alps	Bolzano	
Sundair	Seasonal: Antalya, Burgas, Heraklion, Kos, Palma de Mallorca, Rhodes, Varna	
SunExpress	Seasonal: Antalya	
Swiss International Air Lines	Zürich	

== Statistics ==
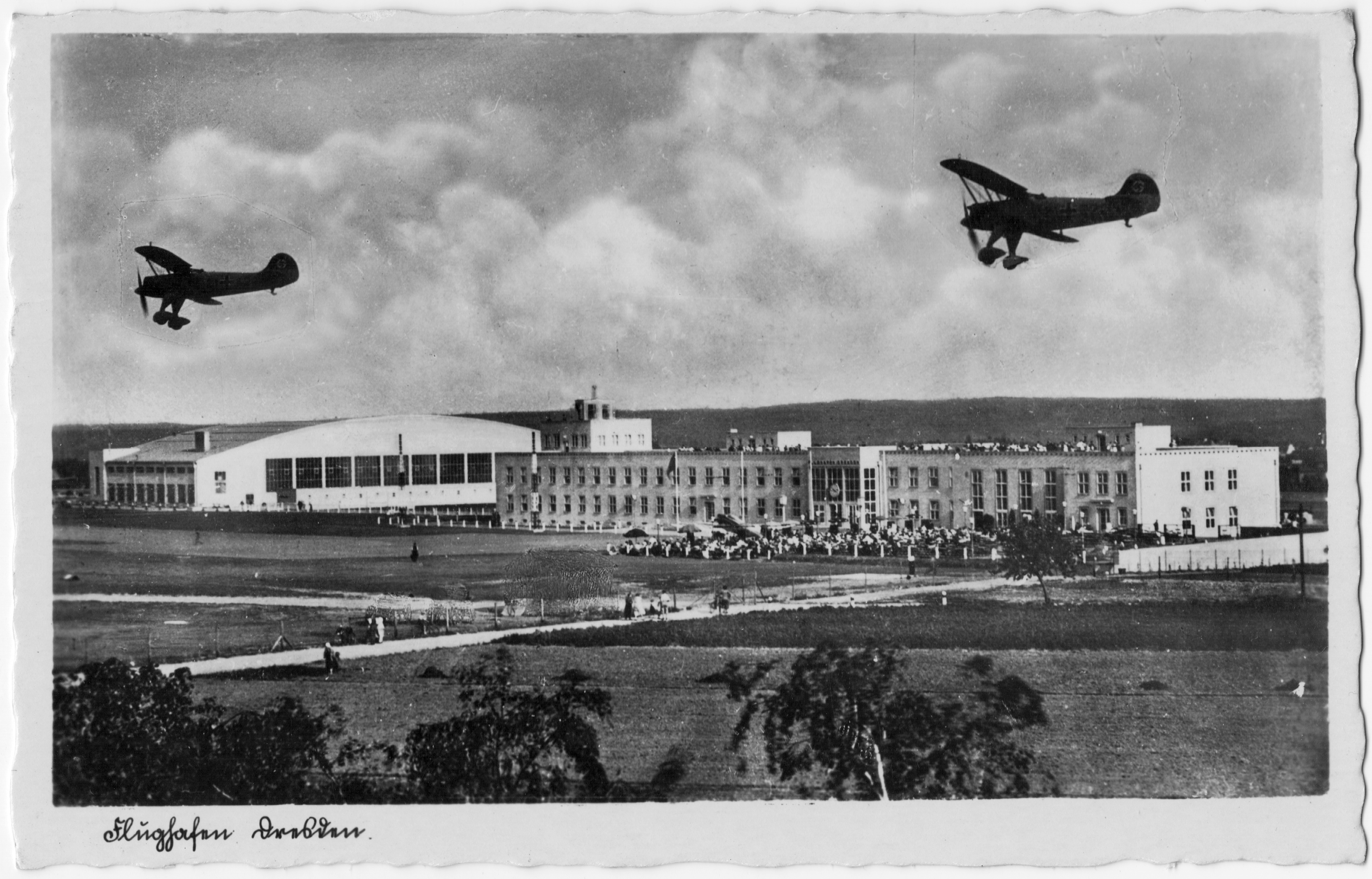
Dresden Airport depicted on a historic postcard from 1930.

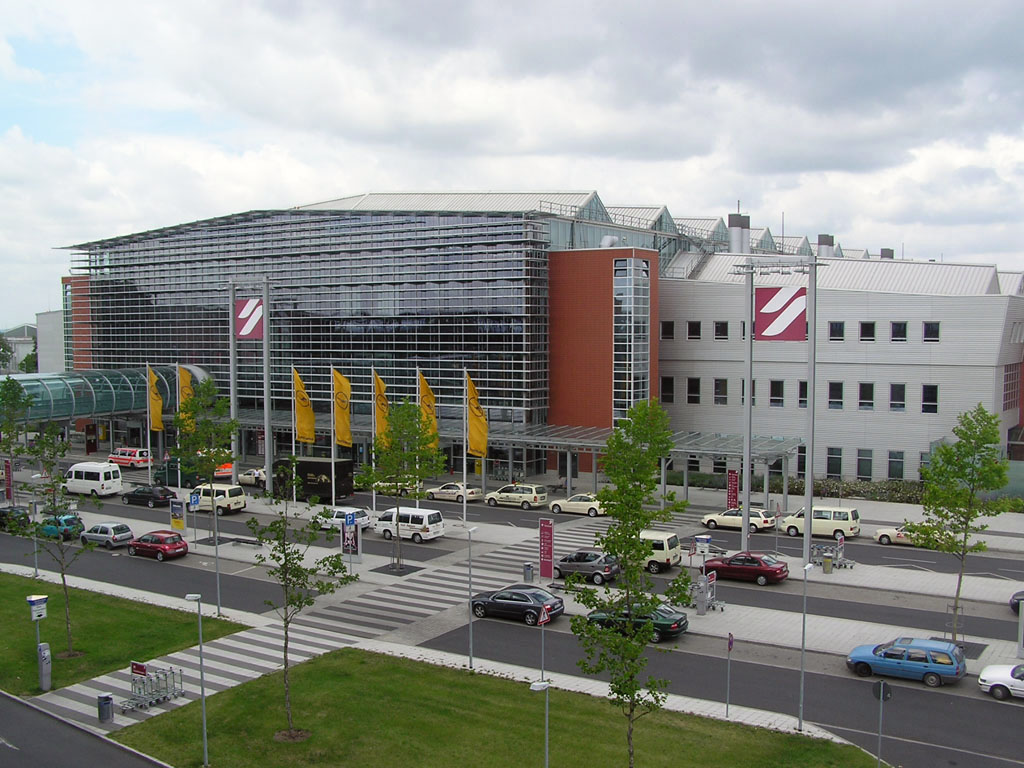
Terminal exterior

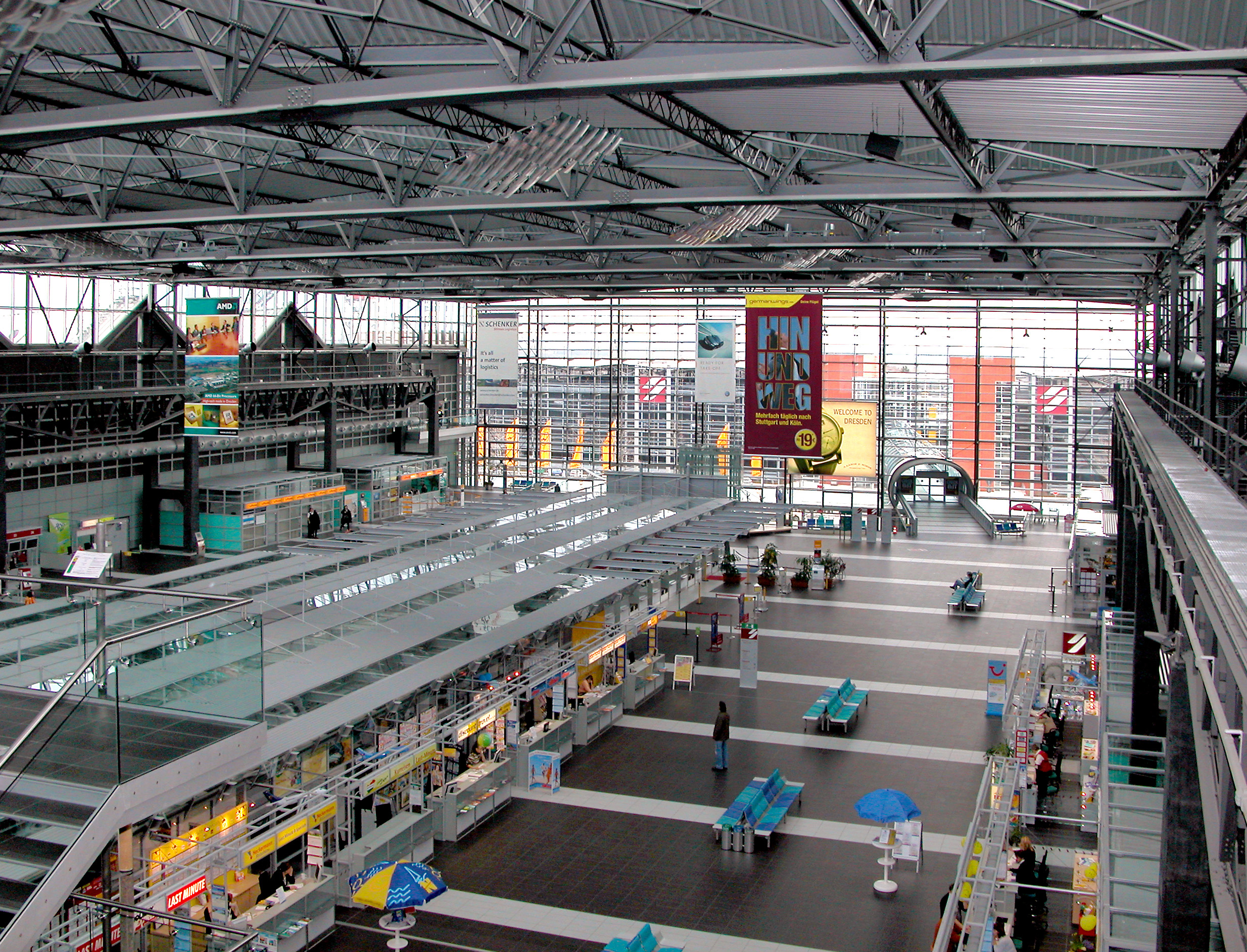
Terminal interior

	Passengers
2000	1,759,638
2001	▼1,642,736
2002	▼1,518,784
2003	▲1,553,774
2004	▲1,620,781
2005	▲1,782,901
2006	▲1,836,068
2007	▲1,849,836
2008	▲1,856,390
2009	▼1,718,923
2010	▲1,843,113
2011	▲1,917,915
2012	▼1,886,425
2013	▼1,754,139
2014	▲1,760,480
2015	▼1,726,471
2016	▼1,667,880
2017	▲1,702,572
2018	▲1,762,175
2019	▼1,595,565
2020	▼383,568
2021	▼331,384
2022	▲838,387
2023	▲929,928
Source: ADV

== Ground transportation ==
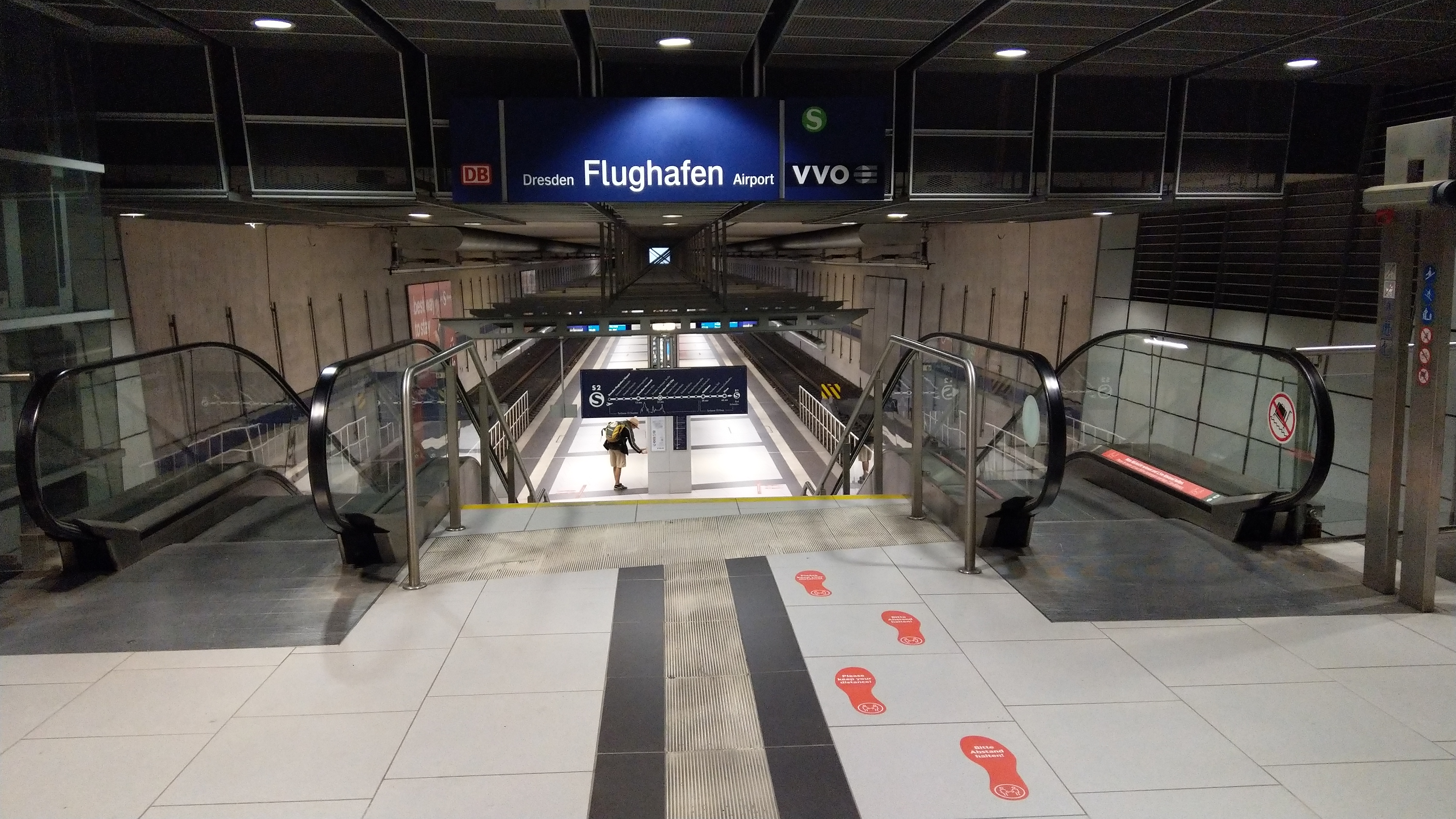
Railway station at Dresden Airport

=== Public transport ===
Dresden Airport railway station is in the basement of the terminal building. It is served by the S2 line of the Dresden S-Bahn, which runs every half-hour to Dresden-Neustadt and Dresden Hauptbahnhof stations in the centre of Dresden, with journey times of 13 and 23 minutes respectively. On weekdays the trains continue on to the towns of Heidenau and Pirna.

Dresdner Verkehrsbetriebe (DVB) bus route 77 links the airport to DVB tram route 7, providing an alternative route to central Dresden. DVB bus route 80 links the airport to the districts of Klotzsche, Wilder Mann, Trachau and Cotta as well as the town of Boxdorf and also tram route 7. In 2020 DVB published plans for a new tram line 17 to branch off of tram line 7 serving the airport.

The airport is in the Verkehrsverbund Oberelbe's Dresden tariff zone, as is central Dresden. A single ticket is valid on the S-Bahn, trams and buses within that zone. Other tariff zones cover the surrounding towns as far as Meißen and the Czech border. Tickets can be purchased at ticket vending machines in the station, at the bus stop, or at the airport information desk on the Arrivals level of the terminal.

=== Road transport ===
Dresden Airport is around 9 km (5.6 mi) north of the centre of Dresden. The direct journey, on city streets, takes about 20 minutes.

The airport is served by an adjacent junction on the A4 Autobahn, which by-passes central Dresden on its route from Aachen, on the Dutch border, to Görlitz, on the Polish border. Junctions in the Dresden area connect the A4 to the A13, to Berlin, and the A17, to the Czech border and Prague.

The airport has a multi-storey car park with approximately 1,500 spaces, connected to the terminal building by a glass-covered pedestrian bridge. Additionally, there are three long-stay car parks, and a short-stay car park right next to the terminal access.

== See also ==
- Transport in Germany
- List of airports in Germany
