= Erfurt–Weimar Airport =

Airport in Germany

Erfurt–Weimar Airport Flughafen Erfurt–Weimar

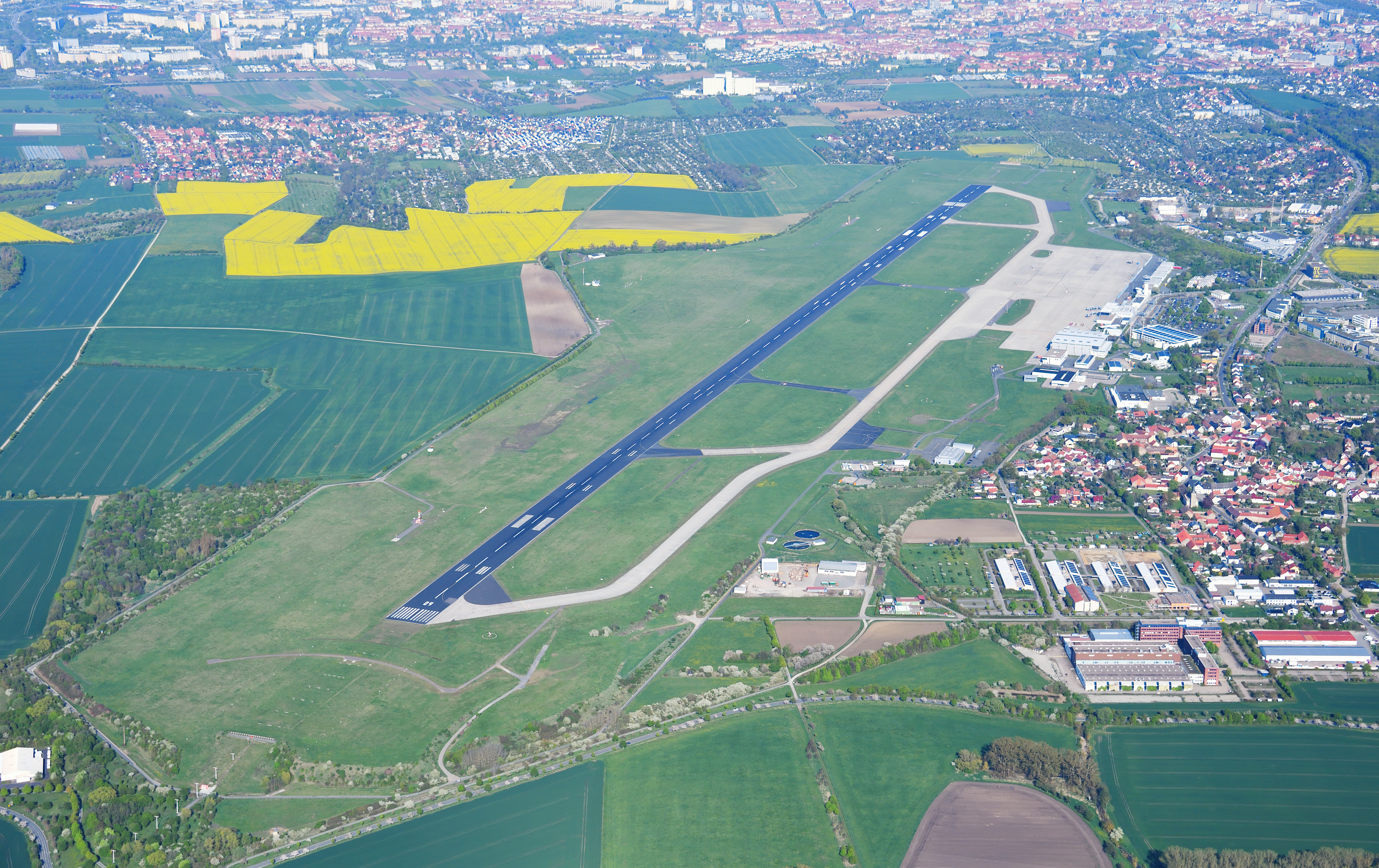
- IATA: ERF; ICAO: EDDE

Summary
- Airport type: Public
- Operator: Flughafen Erfurt GmbH
- Serves: Erfurt and Weimar
- Location: Erfurt, Germany
- Elevation AMSL: 1,036 ft (316 m)
- Coordinates: 50°58′47″N 010°57′29″E
- Website: Flughafen-erfurt-weimar.de

Map
- Location of the airport in Thuringia EDDE (Germany) EDDE (Europe)

Runways
| Direction | Length | | Surface |
| Direction | m | ft | Surface |
|---|---|---|---|
| 09/27 | 2,600 | 8,530 | Asphalt |

Statistics (2025)
- Passengers: ▲314,108
- Aircraft movements: ▲7,328
- Freight (in tons): ▲147
- Source: Statistics, ADV, AIP at German air traffic control.

Erfurt–Weimar Airport (German: Flughafen Erfurt–Weimar, formerly Erfurt Airport, IATA: ERF, ICAO: EDDE) serves Erfurt, the capital of the German state of Thuringia, and the nearby city of Weimar, both of which form the largest part of the state's central metropolitan area. The airport is 5 km (3.1 mi) west of Erfurt city center and is mainly used for seasonal charter flights to European leisure destinations.

== History ==
=== Foundation and early years ===
The first Erfurt airport was built in the mid-1920s at Roter Berg in the north of the city, later also known as Erfurt-North. At the beginning of the Second World War in 1939, this site was taken over by the Luftwaffe, thus ending passenger traffic. With the end of the war in 1945, Erfurt-North was closed, but in 1956, the pre-military organisation Gesellschaft für Sport und Technik resumed glider operations here. In 1974, the airfield was finally closed in order to build the residential area Roter Berg on the site.

The foundation for today's Erfurt–Weimar Airport was laid in 1935, when a new air base was built by the Luftwaffe west of Erfurt near Bindersleben. In 1945 the air base was taken over by the Red Army, which stationed an alert unit with MiG-15 fighter planes here in the 1950s. Around 1957 the airfield was handed over to the East German authorities, who extended it and built a 2,000 m-long (6,600 ft) concrete runway. In the following years the airfield was used by the East German Lufthansa and later by Interflug for domestic flights until these were discontinued in 1980. In addition, there were individual connections to socialist countries, especially to Budapest in Hungary. Erfurt was also a base for Interflug’s agricultural aviation with the Erfurt district squadron stationed here.

=== Development since 1990 ===
After German reunification, Erfurt Airport was further expanded and the runway was extended to 2600 m.

The airport's name was changed from Erfurt Airport in 2011, it was felt that from a marketing point of view the addition of Weimar to the name would better sell the area due to its historic importance.

Despite its importance as a state capital and its central location within Germany, the airport features no domestic flights. The only route to Munich Airport offered by Cirrus Airlines ceased by March 2012. However, the city became one of Germany's most important long distance railway hubs by 2017, when the newly constructed Munich-Berlin high-speed line met the Frankfurt-Dresden line at Erfurt main station. As a result, it is possible to reach Frankfurt, Berlin and Munich within two hours by rail from Erfurt, making domestic flights redundant. After the shutdown of Germania in early 2019, the airport lost the vast majority of its routes.

== Facilities ==
The airport consists of one passenger and one business terminal. The passenger terminal features two aircraft parking positions and four boarding gates on two levels, the upper ones are equipped with jet bridges. There are also some shops and restaurants, a visitors terrace as well as travel and rental car agencies inside the terminal. The apron also features several additional bus-boarding stands for mid-sized aircraft such as the Boeing 737.

== Airlines and destinations ==
The following airlines operate regular scheduled and charter flights at Erfurt–Weimar Airport:

| Airlines | Destinations |
|---|---|
| Air Cairo | Seasonal: Hurghada |
| Air Nostrum | Seasonal charter: Palma de Mallorca |
| Corendon Airlines | Antalya |
| Electra Airways | Seasonal charter: Burgas |
| Eurowings | Seasonal: Palma de Mallorca |
| Freebird Airlines | Seasonal: Antalya |
| LEAV Aviation | Seasonal: Antalya, Heraklion, Rhodos |
| Mavi Gök Airlines | Seasonal charter: Antalya |
| Pegasus Airlines | Seasonal: Antalya |
| Red Sea Airlines | Seasonal charter: Hurghada |
| SunExpress | Seasonal: Antalya |

== Statistics ==
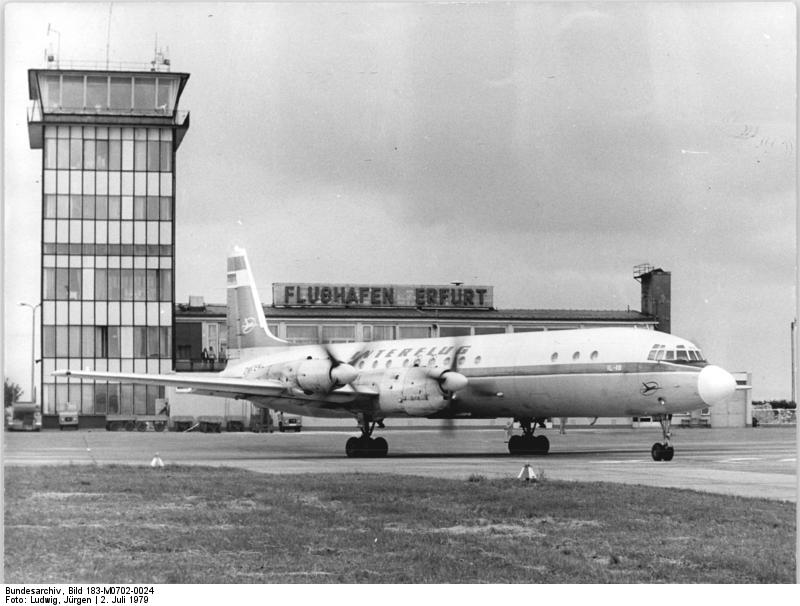
Erfurt Airport in 1979

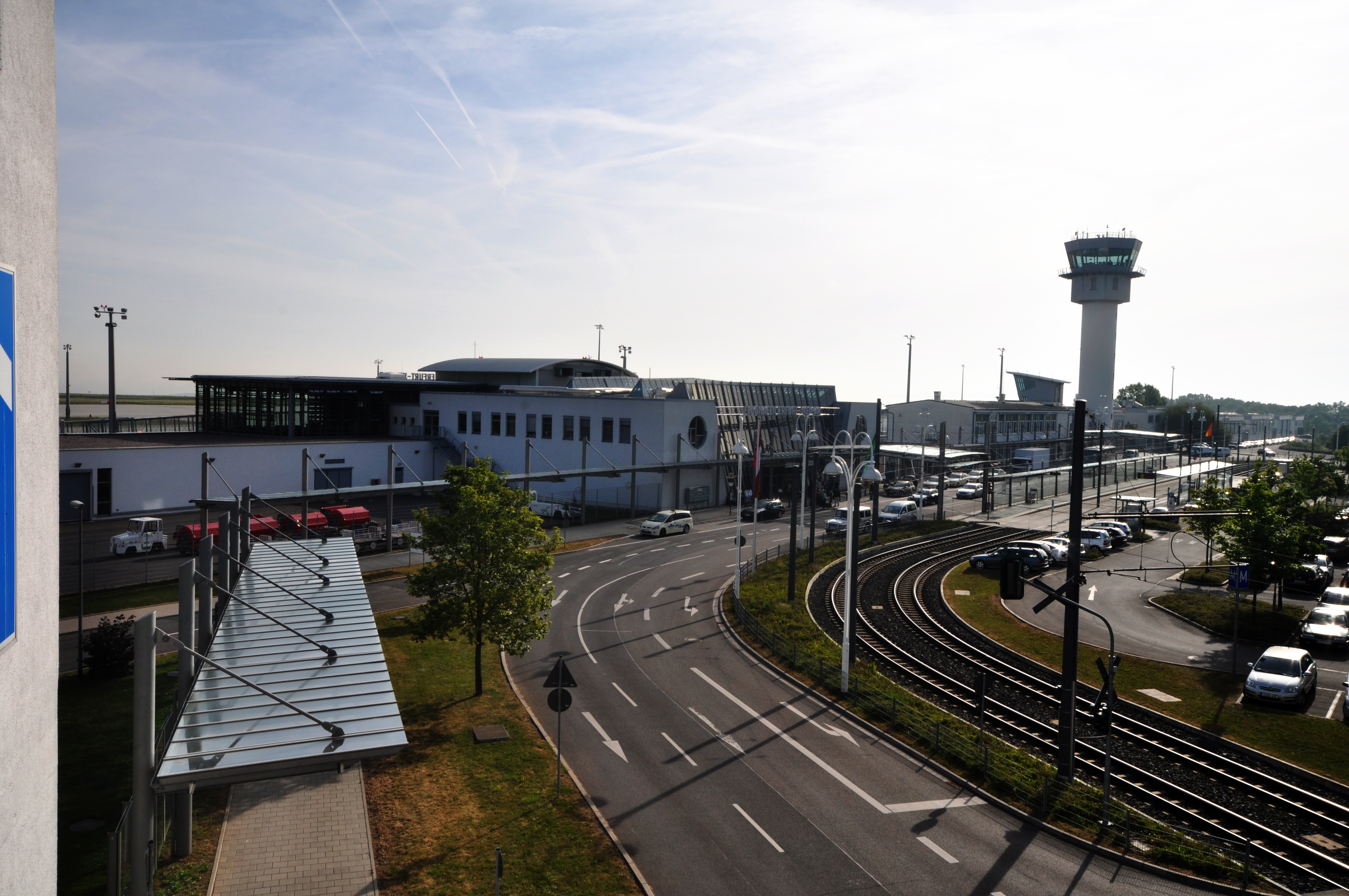
Terminal exterior

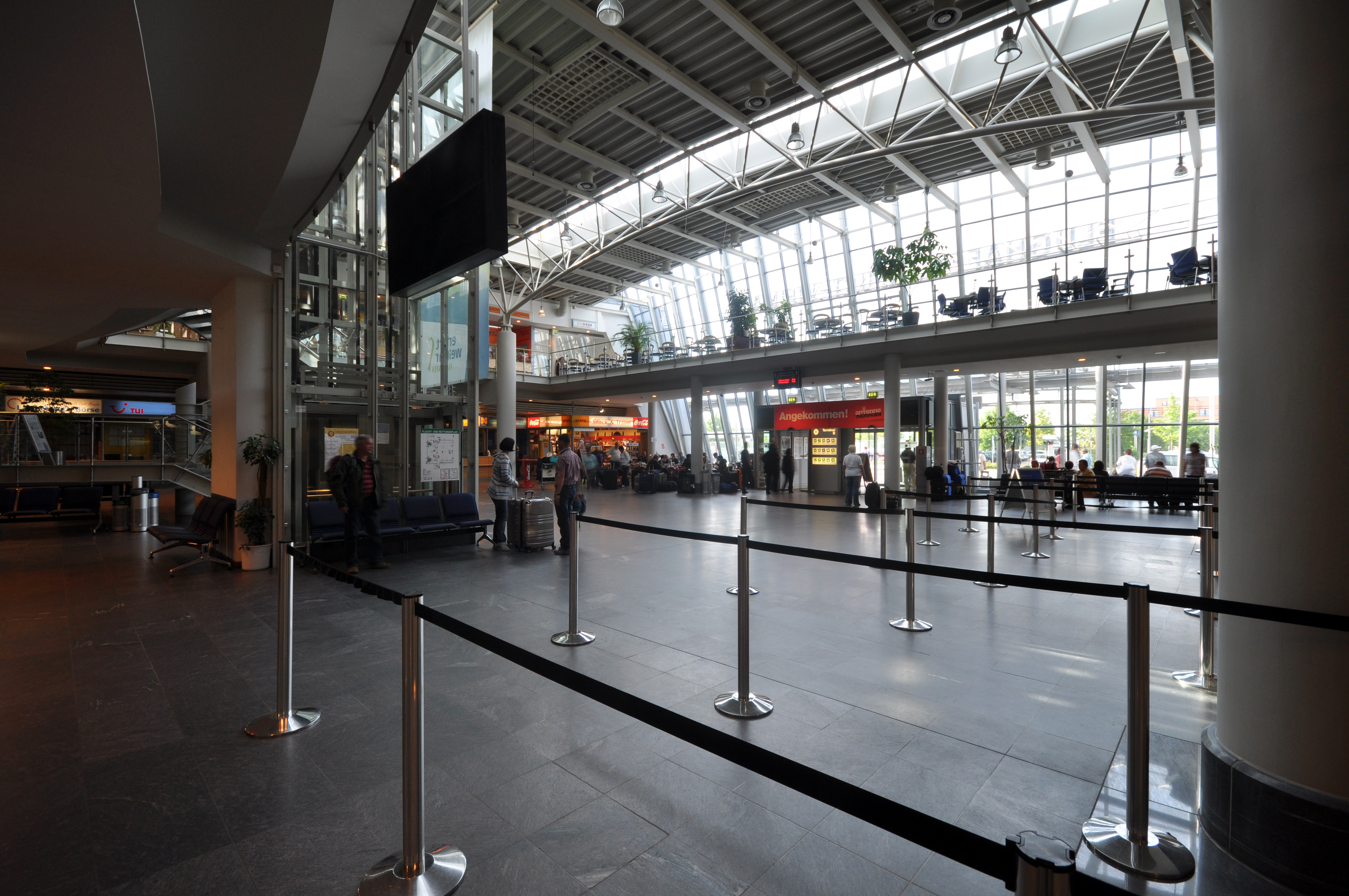
Terminal interior

| | Passengers |
|---|---|
| 2000 | 481,573 |
| 2001 | ▼471,624 |
| 2002 | ▼445,504 |
| 2003 | ▲464,681 |
| 2004 | ▲526,241 |
| 2005 | ▼438,912 |
| 2006 | ▼356,378 |
| 2007 | ▼315,759 |
| 2008 | ▼308,228 |
| 2009 | ▼270,267 |
| 2010 | ▲322,073 |
| 2011 | ▼280,913 |
| 2012 | ▼183,999 |
| 2013 | ▲214,948 |
| 2014 | ▲226,581 |
| 2015 | ▲230,436 |
| 2016 | ▲235,331 |
| 2017 | ▲282,731 |
| 2018 | ▼262,530 |
| 2019 | ▼156,326 |
| 2020 | ▼27,542 |
| 2021 | ▲71,665 |
| 2022 | ▲137,779 |
| 2023 | ▼134,547 |
| 2024 | ▲169,732 |
| 2025 | ▲314,108 |
^{Source: ADV German Airports Association}

== Ground transportation ==
=== Car ===
The airport can be reached via nearby A71 motorway (Erfurt-Bindersleben exit) which leads from Erfurt to Schweinfurt in Bavaria.

=== Tram ===
Erfurt Tram line No. 4 to the suburb of Bindersleben stops in front of the airport. The trams depart every 10–20 minutes and connect the airport with Erfurt's main train station via the city centre in about 20 minutes.

== See also ==
- Transport in Germany
- List of airports in Germany
