= Deutsche Flugsicherung =

Air traffic control body in Germany

DFS Deutsche Flugsicherung
- Company type: GmbH
- Industry: Air traffic control
- Founded: January 1, 1993
- Headquarters: Langen, Hesse, Germany
- Number of locations: 4 Control Centers (2016) Operates 16 Airport Towers in Germany (2016)
- Area served: Nationwide
- Revenue: € 1,376 Million (2021)
- Owner: Federal Republic of Germany
- Number of employees: 6000+ (1,897 Air Traffic Controllers) (2009)
- Website: www.dfs.de (English)

Deutsche Flugsicherung (German pronunciation: [ˈdɔʏtʃə ˈfluːkˌzɪçəʁʊŋ], lit. 'German air traffic control', abbr. DFS) is the company in charge of air traffic control for Germany. It is a company organized under private law and 100% owned by the Federal Republic of Germany. Since January 1993, DFS has been controlling air traffic in Germany. In Germany, military and civil air traffic controllers work side by side. Since 1994, DFS has been responsible for the handling of both civil and military air traffic in peacetime. Only military aerodromes are exempted from this integration.

== History ==
DFS was formed by the Bundesanstalt für Flugsicherung (BFS). The BFS was established in 1953 and closed in January 1993. Previously, DFS was founded as a private GmbH.

== Running costs and fees ==
DFS's running costs are covered by applicable route charges ("Flugsicherungsgebühren", collected by Eurocontrol for its 37 participating member states) and by approach and departure fees (determination by the BMVI by ordinance and collected directly by DFS)

According to the Gesellschaftsvertrag, DFS is a not-for-profit company. Any surpluses generated must also be repaid in accordance with the internationally accepted principles for the collection of air navigation charges to airspace users.

== Area control centers ==
DFS operates four area control centers located in:

- Bremen
- Langen, Hesse (HQ)
- Karlsruhe
- Munich

== Towers ==
DFS operates the air navigation services on behalf and at its own expense, as defined by the BMVI at the following airports:

- Berlin-Brandenburg – EDDB
- Bremen – EDDW
- Dresden – EDDC
- Düsseldorf – EDDL
- Erfurt – EDDE
- Frankfurt – EDDF
- Hamburg – EDDH
- Hanover – EDDV
- Cologne / Bonn – EDDK
- Leipzig / Halle – EDDP
- Munich – EDDM
- Munster / Osnabrück – EDDG
- Nuremberg – EDDN
- Saarbrücken – EDDR
- Stuttgart – EDDS

== Subsidiaries ==
The subsidiary DFS Aviation Services GmbH provides air navigations services at the following regional airports of Germany:

- Dortmund
- Niederrhein-Weeze
- Karlsruhe/Baden-Baden
- Memmingen
- Mönchengladbach
- Paderborn-Lippstadt
- Lahr
- Friedrichshafen
- Magdeburg-Cochstedt
- Braunschweig-Wolfsburg,
- Emden via Remote Tower Center at Braunschweig-Wolfsburg airport

DFS Aviation Services GmbH has the following own subsidiaries:

- DFS Aviation Services Bahrain: Air Traffic Services in Bahrain
- FREQUENTIS DFS AEROSENSE: Joint Venture with FREQUENTIS for the marketing of Remote Tower Systems
- Air Navigation Solutions: Air Traffic Services at Edinburgh Airport
- DFS Aviation Services Lima: Apron control at Lima airport
- DFS Aviation Services Singapore: Consulting services in South East Asia
- DFS Aviation Services Beijing: Consulting services in China

== Trivia ==
The DFS develops and uses Linux based Software for their purpose.
