= List of Eurowings destinations =

As of February 2021, German low-cost carrier Eurowings serves the following destinations throughout Africa, Asia and Europe.

In October 2015, Eurowings began to serve several destinations formerly served by the Germanwings brand. In early 2021, Eurowings removed all of their long-haul destinations, which had been served from Düsseldorf, Munich and Frankfurt from their network. At the same time, parent Lufthansa announced the foundation of their new long-haul carrier Eurowings Discover.

== Destinations ==
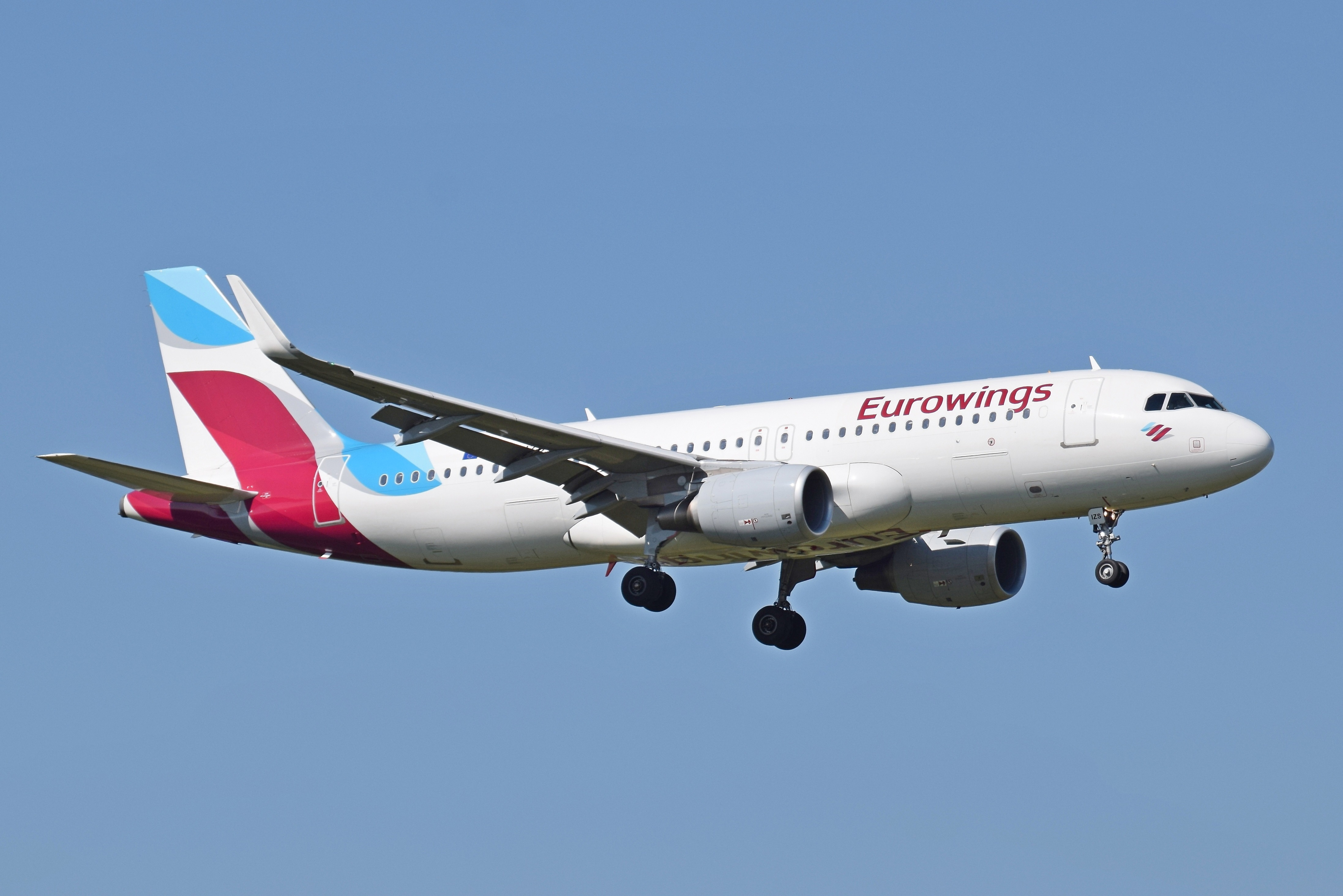
Eurowings Airbus A320-200

Country	City	Airport	Notes	Refs
Albania	Tirana	Tirana International Airport Nënë Tereza		
Armenia	Yerevan	Zvartnots International Airport	Seasonal	
Austria	Graz	Graz Airport	Base	
Austria	Innsbruck	Innsbruck Airport	Seasonal	
Austria	Klagenfurt	Klagenfurt Airport	Terminated	
Austria	Linz	Linz Airport		
Austria	Salzburg	Salzburg Airport	Base	
Austria	Vienna	Vienna International Airport		
Barbados	Bridgetown	Grantley Adams International Airport	Terminated	
Belgium	Brussels	Brussels Airport	Seasonal	
Bosnia and Herzegovina	Mostar	Mostar International Airport		
Bosnia and Herzegovina	Sarajevo	Sarajevo International Airport		
Bulgaria	Sofia	Sofia Airport	Terminated	
Bulgaria	Varna	Varna Airport		
Croatia	Dubrovnik	Dubrovnik Airport		
Croatia	Osijek	Osijek Airport	Terminated	
Croatia	Pula	Pula Airport	Seasonal	
Croatia	Rijeka	Rijeka Airport	Seasonal	
Croatia	Split	Split Airport		
Croatia	Zadar	Zadar Airport		
Croatia	Zagreb	Zagreb Airport		
Cuba	Havana	José Martí International Airport	Terminated	
Cuba	Varadero	Juan Gualberto Gómez Airport	Terminated	
Cyprus	Larnaca	Larnaca International Airport		
Czech Republic	Prague	Václav Havel Airport Prague	Base	
Denmark	Copenhagen	Copenhagen Airport		
Dominican Republic	Punta Cana	Gregorio Luperón International Airport	Terminated	
Egypt	Cairo	Cairo International Airport		
Egypt	Marsa Alam	Marsa Alam International Airport		
Estonia	Tallinn	Tallinn Airport		
Finland	Helsinki	Helsinki Airport		
Finland	Ivalo	Ivalo Airport	Seasonal	
Finland	Kajaani	Kajaani Airport		
Finland	Kittilä	Kittilä Airport	Seasonal	
Finland	Kuusamo	Kuusamo Airport	Seasonal	
Finland	Rovaniemi	Rovaniemi Airport	Seasonal	
France	Bastia	Bastia–Poretta Airport	Seasonal	
France	Calvi	Calvi – Sainte-Catherine Airport	Seasonal	
France	Lyon	Lyon–Saint-Exupéry Airport		
France	Marseille	Marseille Provence Airport		
France	Montpellier	Montpellier–Méditerranée Airport	Seasonal	
France	Nice	Nice Côte d'Azur Airport		
France	Paris	Charles de Gaulle Airport		
France	Toulouse	Toulouse–Blagnac Airport	Terminated	
Georgia	Tbilisi	Tbilisi International Airport		
Germany	Berlin	Berlin Brandenburg Airport	Base	
Germany	Berlin	Berlin Schönefeld Airport	Airport closed	
Germany	Berlin	Berlin Tegel Airport	Airport closed	
Germany	Bremen	Bremen Airport		
Germany	Cologne/Bonn	Cologne Bonn Airport	Base	
Germany	Dortmund	Dortmund Airport	Base	
Germany	Dresden	Dresden Airport		
Germany	Düsseldorf	Düsseldorf Airport	Base	
Germany	Erfurt/Weimar	Erfurt–Weimar Airport	Seasonal	
Germany	Frankfurt	Frankfurt Airport		
Germany	Hamburg	Hamburg Airport	Base	
Germany	Heringsdorf	Heringsdorf Airport	Terminated	
Germany	Hanover	Hannover Airport		
Germany	Karlsruhe/Baden-Baden	Karlsruhe/Baden-Baden Airport		
Germany	Leipzig/Halle	Leipzig/Halle Airport		
Germany	Memmingen	Memmingen Airport	Seasonal	
Germany	Munich	Munich Airport		
Germany	Münster	Münster Osnabrück Airport		
Germany	Nuremberg	Nuremberg Airport		
Germany	Paderborn	Paderborn Lippstadt Airport		
Germany	Saarbrücken	Saarbrücken Airport		
Germany	Stuttgart	Stuttgart Airport	Base	
Germany	Sylt	Sylt Airport		
Germany	Weeze	Weeze Airport	Terminated	
Greece	Athens	Athens International Airport		
Greece	Chania	Chania International Airport		
Greece	Corfu	Corfu International Airport		
Greece	Heraklion	Heraklion International Airport		
Greece	Kavala	Kavala International Airport		
Greece	Kos	Kos International Airport		
Greece	Mykonos	Mykonos Airport		
Greece	Rhodes	Rhodes International Airport		
Greece	Samos	Samos International Airport		
Greece	Santorini	Santorini (Thira) International Airport		
Greece	Thessaloniki	Thessaloniki Airport		
Greece	Zakynthos	Zakynthos International Airport	Seasonal	
Guernsey	Guernsey	Guernsey Airport	Terminated	
Hungary	Budapest	Budapest Ferenc Liszt International Airport		
Iceland	Reykjavík	Keflavik International Airport	Seasonal	
Iraq	Baghdad	Baghdad International Airport	Seasonal (Begins December 10, 2026)	
Ireland	Dublin	Dublin Airport		
Israel	Tel Aviv	Ben Gurion Airport		
Italy	Bari	Bari Karol Wojtyła Airport		
Italy	Bologna	Bologna Guglielmo Marconi Airport		
Italy	Brindisi	Brindisi Airport		
Italy	Cagliari	Cagliari Elmas Airport	Seasonal	
Italy	Catania	Catania–Fontanarossa Airport		
Italy	Florence	Florence Airport		
Italy	Lamezia Terme	Lamezia Terme International Airport	Seasonal	
Italy	Milan	Milan Malpensa Airport		
Italy	Naples	Naples International Airport		
Italy	Olbia	Olbia Costa Smeralda Airport	Seasonal	
Italy	Palermo	Falcone Borsellino Airport		
Italy	Pisa	Pisa International Airport	Seasonal	
Italy	Rome	Rome Fiumicino Airport		
Italy	Venice	Venice Marco Polo Airport		
Italy	Verona	Verona Villafranca Airport	Seasonal	
Jamaica	Montego Bay	Sangster International Airport	Terminated	
Jersey	Jersey	Jersey Airport	Seasonal	
Jordan	Amman	Queen Alia International Airport		
Kosovo	Pristina	Pristina International Airport	Base	
Lebanon	Beirut	Beirut–Rafic Hariri International Airport		
Malta	Luqa	Malta International Airport	Seasonal	
Mauritius	Port Louis	Sir Seewoosagur Ramgoolam International Airport	Terminated	
Mexico	Cancún	Cancún International Airport	Terminated	
Moldova	Chișinău	Chișinău Eugen Doga International Airport		
Montenegro	Tivat	Tivat Airport		
Morocco	Agadir	Agadir–Al Massira Airport		
Morocco	Casablanca	Mohammed V International Airport		
Morocco	Marrakesh	Marrakesh Menara Airport		
Morocco	Nador	Nador International Airport		
Morocco	Tangier	Tangier Ibn Battouta Airport	Seasonal	
Namibia	Windhoek	Hosea Kutako International Airport	Terminated	
Netherlands	Amsterdam	Amsterdam Airport Schiphol	Terminated	
North Macedonia	Ohrid	Ohrid St. Paul the Apostle Airport	Terminated	
Norway	Bergen	Bergen Airport, Flesland	Seasonal	
Norway	Oslo	Oslo Gardermoen Airport		
Norway	Tromsø	Tromsø Airport	Seasonal	
Poland	Gdańsk	Gdańsk Lech Wałęsa Airport		
Poland	Kraków	Kraków John Paul II International Airport		
Poland	Poznań	Poznań-Ławica Airport	Terminated	
Poland	Wrocław	Wrocław Airport		
Portugal	Faro	Faro Airport		
Portugal	Funchal	Madeira Airport	Seasonal	
Portugal	Lisbon	Lisbon Airport		
Portugal	Porto	Porto Airport	Seasonal	
Portugal	Porto Santo	Porto Santo Airport	Terminated	
Romania	Bucharest	Bucharest Henri Coandă International Airport		
Romania	Cluj-Napoca	Cluj International Airport		
Romania	Sibiu	Sibiu International Airport	Terminated	
Romania	Timișoara	Timișoara Traian Vuia International Airport		
Russia	Krasnodar	Krasnodar International Airport	Terminated	
Russia	Yekaterinburg	Koltsovo International Airport	Terminated	
Saudi Arabia	Jeddah	King Abdulaziz International Airport		
Serbia	Belgrade	Belgrade Nikola Tesla Airport		
Slovakia	Košice	Košice International Airport		
South Africa	Cape Town	Cape Town International Airport	Terminated	
Spain	Alicante	Alicante–Elche Miguel Hernández Airport		
Spain	Barcelona	Josep Tarradellas Barcelona–El Prat Airport		
Spain	Bilbao	Bilbao Airport		
Spain	Fuerteventura	Fuerteventura Airport		
Spain	Ibiza	Ibiza Airport		
Spain	Jerez de la Frontera	Jerez Airport		
Spain	La Palma	La Palma Airport		
Spain	Lanzarote	Lanzarote Airport		
Spain	Las Palmas	Gran Canaria Airport		
Spain	Málaga	Málaga Airport		
Spain	Menorca	Menorca Airport	Seasonal	
Spain	Palma de Mallorca	Palma de Mallorca Airport	Base	
Spain	Santiago de Compostela	Santiago–Rosalía de Castro Airport		
Spain	Tenerife	Tenerife South Airport		
Spain	Valencia	Valencia Airport		
Sweden	Arvidsjaur	Arvidsjaur Airport	Seasonal Charter	
Sweden	Gothenburg	Göteborg Landvetter Airport		
Sweden	Kiruna	Kiruna Airport	Seasonal	
Sweden	Luleå	Luleå Airport	Seasonal	
Sweden	Stockholm	Stockholm Arlanda Airport	Base	
Switzerland	Geneva	Geneva Airport		
Switzerland	Zurich	Zurich Airport		
Switzerland; France; Germany	Basel; Mulhouse; Freiburg	EuroAirport Basel Mulhouse Freiburg		
Syria	Damascus	Damascus International Airport	Begins 16 December 2026	
Thailand	Bangkok	Suvarnabhumi Airport	Terminated	
Thailand	Phuket	Phuket International Airport	Terminated	
Tunisia	Monastir	Monastir Habib Bourguiba International Airport	Seasonal	
Tunisia	Tunis	Tunis–Carthage International Airport		
Turkey	Adana	Adana Sakirpasa Airport	Seasonal	
Turkey	Antalya	Antalya Airport	Seasonal	
Turkey	İzmir	İzmir Adnan Menderes Airport	Seasonal	
Turkey	Kütahya	Zafer Airport	Seasonal	
Turkey	Samsun	Samsun-Çarşamba Airport	Seasonal	
Ukraine	Kyiv	Boryspil International Airport	Seasonal	
United Arab Emirates	Abu Dhabi	Zayed International Airport		
United Arab Emirates	Dubai	Al Maktoum International Airport		
United Arab Emirates	Dubai	Dubai International Airport	Seasonal	
United Kingdom	Birmingham	Birmingham Airport		
United Kingdom	Bristol	Bristol Airport	Terminated	
United Kingdom	Cardiff	Cardiff Airport	Terminated	
United Kingdom	East Midlands	East Midlands Airport	Terminated	
United Kingdom	Edinburgh	Edinburgh Airport		
United Kingdom	Glasgow	Glasgow Airport	Seasonal	
United Kingdom	London	Heathrow Airport		
United Kingdom	London	London Stansted Airport	Terminated	
United Kingdom	Manchester	Manchester Airport		
United Kingdom	Newcastle upon Tyne	Newcastle International Airport		
United Kingdom	Newquay	Newquay Airport	Seasonal	
United States	Anchorage	Ted Stevens Anchorage International Airport	Terminated	
United States	Boston	Logan International Airport	Terminated	
United States	Fort Myers	Southwest Florida International Airport	Terminated	
United States	Las Vegas	Harry Reid International Airport	Terminated	
United States	Miami	Miami International Airport		
United States	Newark	Newark Liberty International Airport	Terminated	
United States	New York City	John F. Kennedy International Airport	Terminated	
United States	Orlando	Orlando International Airport	Terminated	
United States	Seattle	Seattle–Tacoma International Airport	Terminated	
