= Eurowings Europe =

Maltese low-cost airline

Eurowings Europe Ltd.

- Eurowings Europe Airbus A320
IATA	ICAO	Call sign
E6	EWL	BLACK PEARL
- Founded: December 3, 2022; 3 years ago
- Commenced operations: 3 December 2022; 3 years ago
- Operating bases: Graz; Palma de Mallorca; Prague; Salzburg; Stockholm–Arlanda
- Frequent-flyer program: Miles & More
- Fleet size: 29
- Parent company: Eurowings; Lufthansa Group
- Headquarters: St. Julian's, Malta
- Website: eurowings.com

Eurowings Europe GmbH

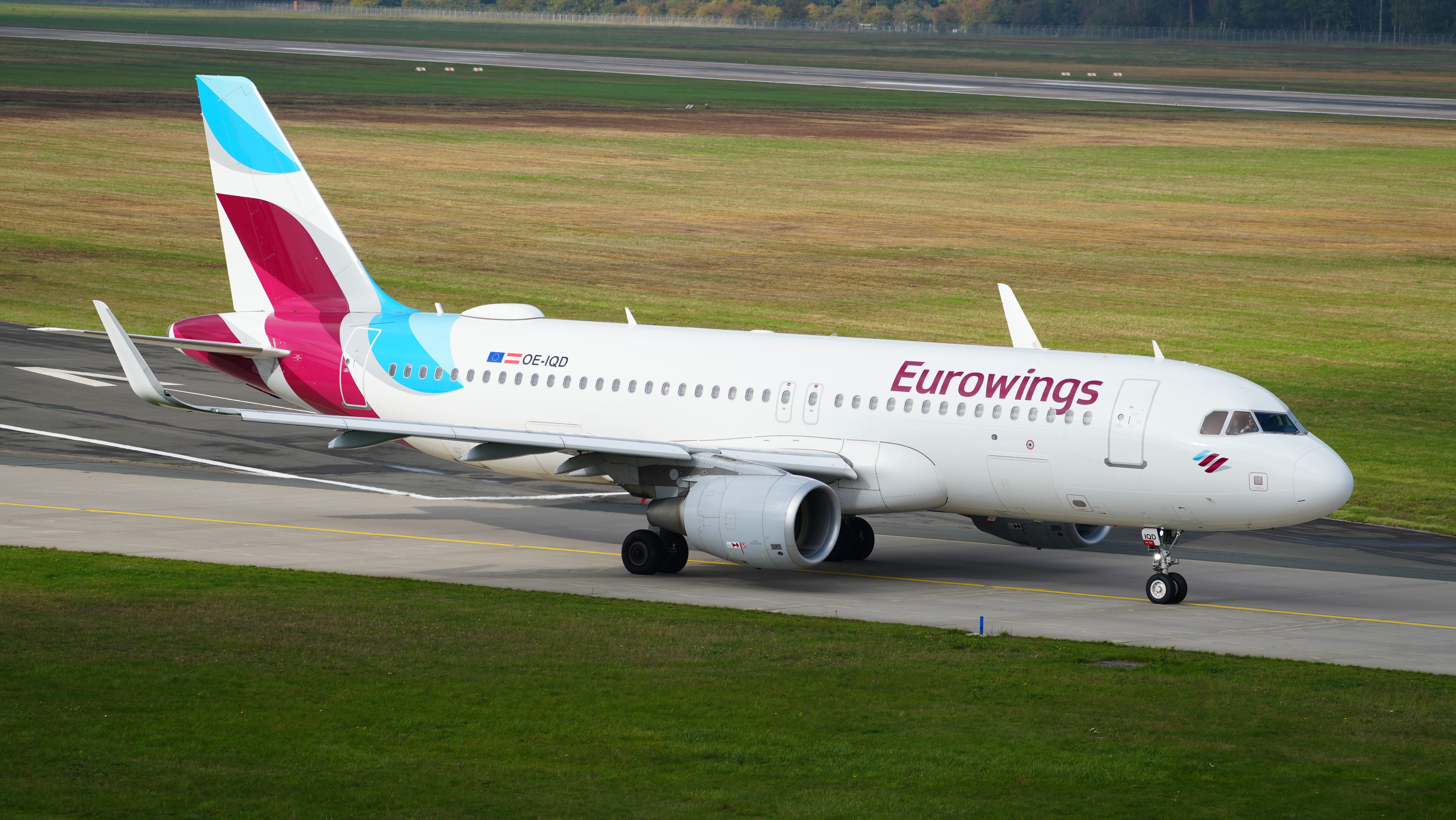
- Eurowings Europe A320ceo with Austrian registration
IATA	ICAO	Call sign
E2	EWE	EUROPWINGS
- Commenced operations: June 23, 2016; 10 years ago
- Ceased operations: January 30, 2023; 3 years ago
- Hubs: Vienna Schwechat
- Focus cities: Salzburg; Palma de Mallorca
- Frequent-flyer program: Miles & More
- Parent company: Lufthansa Group
- Headquarters: Vienna, Austria

Eurowings Europe is a low-cost airline registered in Malta. Eurowings Europe operates and maintains aircraft used on flights that are scheduled, marketed and sold by its sister airline, the Germany based Eurowings. Both airlines are wholly owned subsidiaries of the Lufthansa Group.

== History ==
About a week after obtaining its air operator's certificate from the Austrian civil aviation authorities, Eurowings Europe departed its initial base in Vienna for Alicante on 23 June 2016, its maiden flight. It has adopted the corporate identity of its German sister airline, Eurowings.

In September 2019, Lufthansa Group announced, that Austrian Airlines will lease four Airbus A320-200 from Eurowings Europe starting January 2020. The airline will also take over some of Austrian Airlines' flights from Salzburg Airport and Innsbruck Airport. The Austrian Airlines wet lease contract for four aircraft in Vienna was withdrawn in April 2020 due to the COVID-19 pandemic.

In October 2019, Eurowings Europe took over the base in Pristina from its sister airline Germanwings.

In June 2021 it was announced that Eurowings Europe would expand its European network with the opening of a new base in Prague Airport starting October 2021 with two aircraft based for the winter season and three for the summer. Destinations would include European cities in the likes of Barcelona and Milan and holiday destinations such as the Balearics, Canaries and Tel Aviv.

In July 2022 it was announced that Eurowings Europe GmbH would leave its Austrian registration and it would register in Malta and be renamed as Eurowings Europe Ltd. The move to Malta was expected to lower taxes and cost of operations for the airline, along with reducing income taxes that employees would have to pay. The change took effect on 3 November 2022.

== Destinations ==
Eurowings Europe operates regional flights throughout Europe. As of 2022, it maintains six bases in Vienna, Salzburg, Palma de Mallorca, Prague, Stockholm Arlanda and Pristina. As of 2022 base Vienna is only a crew base and no aircraft are stationed there. In December 2022, Graz was announced as a summer base, but further extended to an all-year operation due to demand.

== Fleet ==
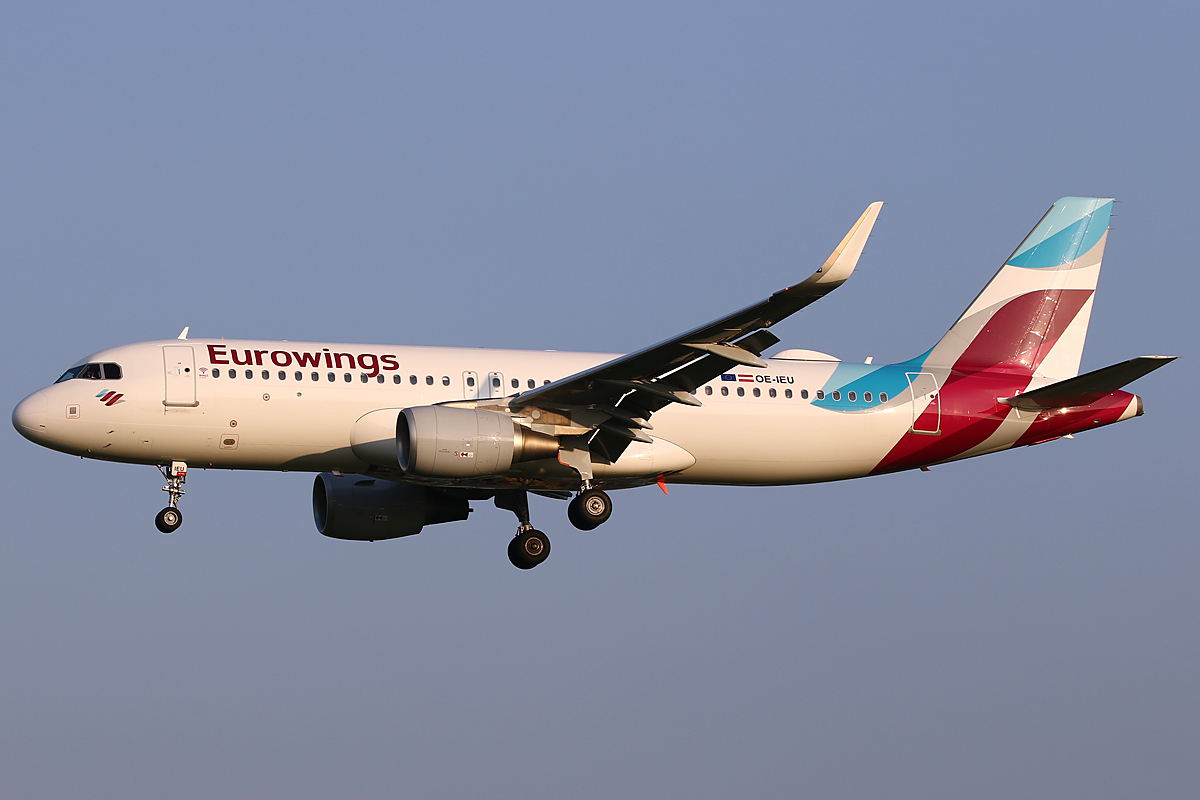
Eurowings Europe Airbus A320-200

As of July 2026, Eurowings Europe (Malta) operates the following aircraft:

Eurowings Europe (Malta) fleet
Aircraft	In service		Passengers	Notes
Airbus A319-100	6		150	Operated for Eurowings.
Airbus A320-200	23	7	174	Operated for Eurowings.
Airbus A320-200	23	16	180	Operated for Eurowings.
Total	29			

=== Former fleet ===
As of August 2025, Eurowings Europe (Malta) operated 6 Airbus A319 and 23 Airbus A320.
