= SunExpress =

Turkish airline

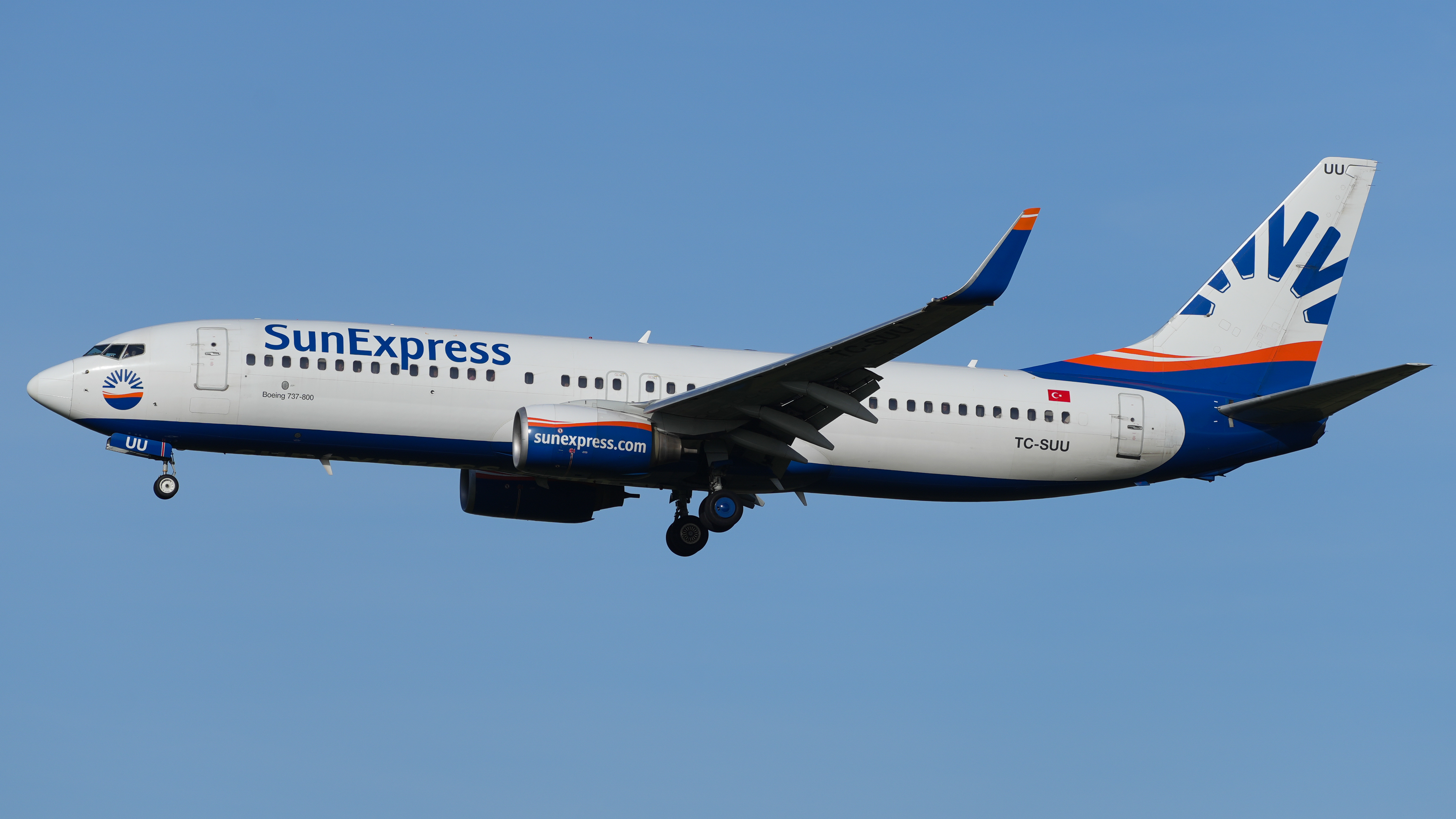
IATA	ICAO	Call sign
XQ	SXS	SUNEXPRESS
- Founded: October 1989; 37 years ago
- Commenced operations: 1990; 36 years ago
- Operating bases: Antalya; İzmir; Ankara
- Frequent-flyer program: your benefits
- Fleet size: 86
- Destinations: 92
- Parent company: Turkish Airlines (50%); Lufthansa Group (50%)
- Headquarters: Antalya, Turkey
- Key people: Marcus Schnabel (CEO)
- Revenue: ▲1.8 billion EUR (2023)
- Employees: 5,000
- Website: www.sunexpress.com

SunExpress is a Turkish airline based in Antalya. SunExpress was founded in October 1989 as a joint venture between Turkish Airlines and Lufthansa. It operates scheduled and chartered passenger flights to 90 destinations in 30 countries in Europe as well as North Africa, the Mediterranean, Black Sea, and Red Sea. The airline concentrates on international tourism, domestic Turkish flights to cities in Anatolia, and wet leasing. The total number of SunExpress employees is 5,000.

== History ==
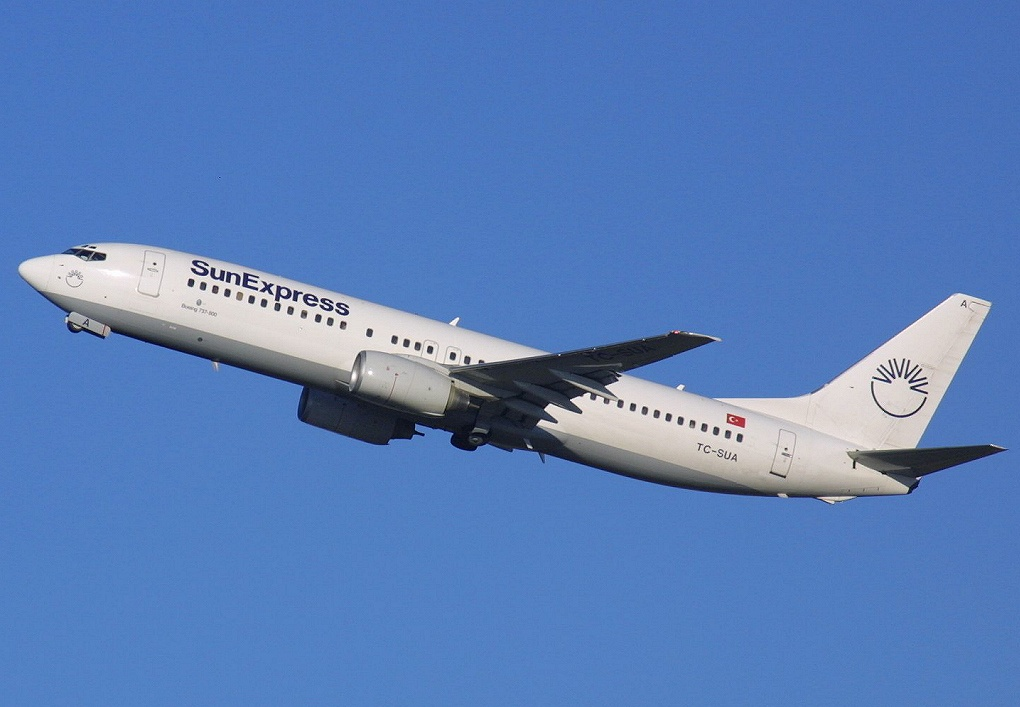
SunExpress Boeing 737-800 in its original livery (2002)

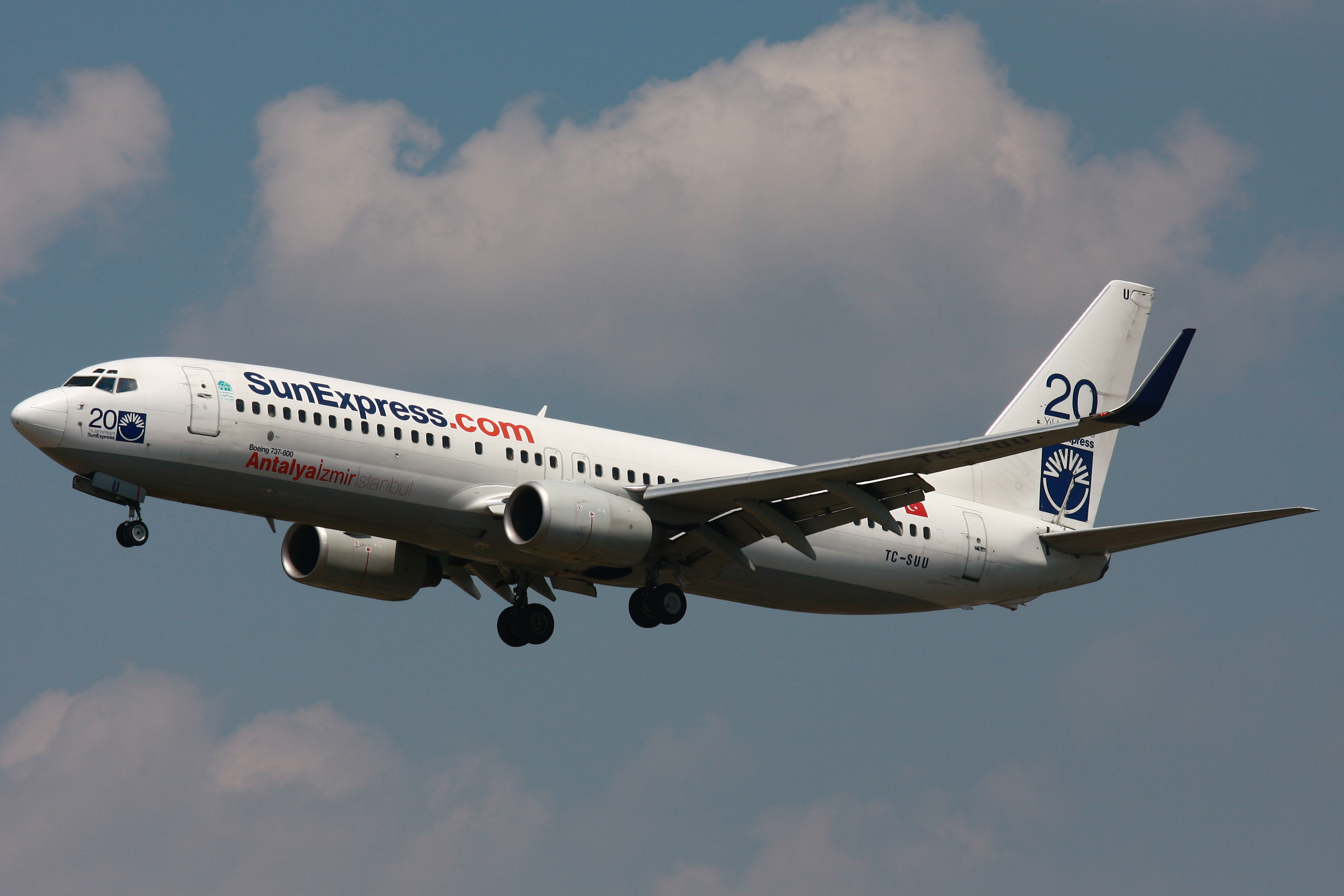
SunExpress Boeing 737-800 wearing a special livery to celebrate the airline's 20th anniversary (2010)

=== Foundation and early years ===
SunExpress was founded in Antalya in October 1989 as a joint venture of Turkish Airlines and Lufthansa. Its first flight was in 1990.

SunExpress became the first private airline company to offer international scheduled flights from Turkey with its first Antalya-Frankfurt flight in 2001. SunExpress opened its second base in İzmir and started to operate domestic flights in 2006. With this launch, SunExpress became the first airline company to connect İzmir with Anatolian cities with direct flights in Turkey.

=== Development since 2010 ===
In May 2010, SunExpress took delivery of the first of six newly purchased Boeing 737-800s and launched its new corporate identity including its new logo, aircraft livery, new corporate colours, uniforms and visual identity elements.

SunExpress Deutschland was founded in 2011. The company started business operations in June 2011. Besides the Turkish destinations on the South Coast, on the Aegean, on the Black Sea and in the East of the country, it also serves – with German registration – destinations along the Mediterranean, Black Sea, North Africa and Red Sea.

On 23 June 2020, it has been announced that SunExpress' German subsidiary SunExpress Deutschland would cease operations and be liquidated. Its route network would be partially taken over by SunExpress and Eurowings.

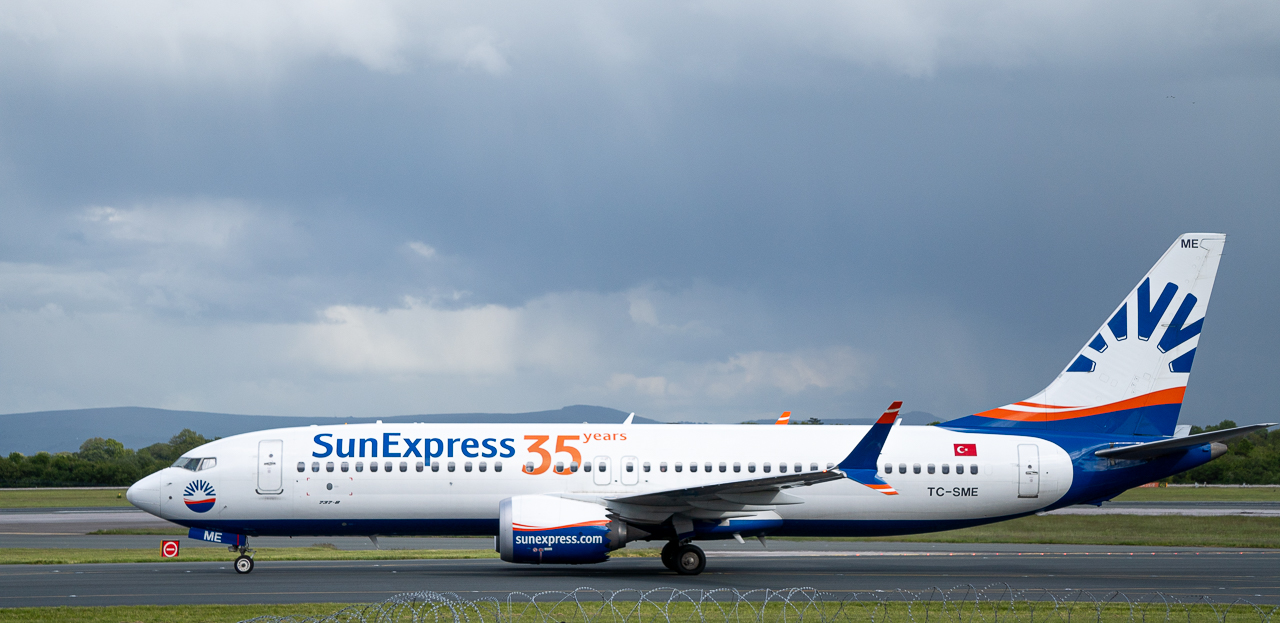
SunExpress Boeing 737 MAX 8 in a special 35 year anniversary livery

On 30 October 2023, SunExpress Airlines successfully completed its inaugural flight to Ercan Airport (Northern Cyprus) with 118 passengers. This special flight coincided with the 100th Anniversary of the Republic of Turkey, marking a significant historical moment. SunExpress will operate flights to Ercan Airport on Sundays, Mondays, Thursdays, and Fridays, making four round trips per week. This new route is highlighted as a crucial step both for travelers wishing to travel from İzmir to Cyprus and for Ercan Airport to serve a broader audience.

== Destinations ==
As of April 2026, SunExpress flies to destinations in 37 countries on over 250 routes serving Europe, North Africa, Western and Central Asia.

=== Codeshare agreements ===
- Austrian Airlines
- Brussels Airlines
- Eurowings
- Lufthansa
- TUI Airways

=== Interline agreements ===
- Air Canada
- Azerbaijan Airlines
- Eurowings
- Swiss International Air Lines
- Turkish Airlines
- United Airlines

== Fleet ==
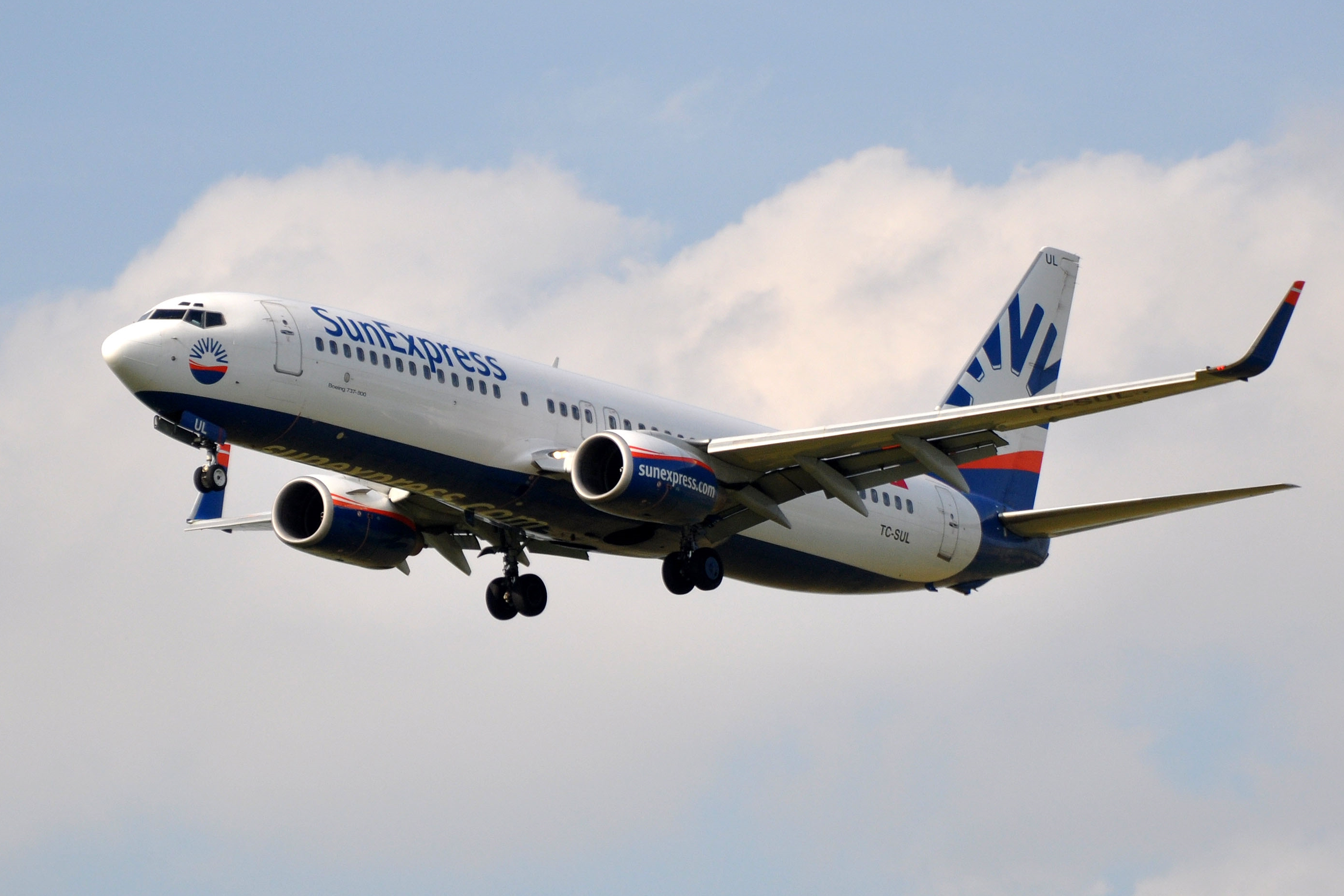
SunExpress Boeing 737-800

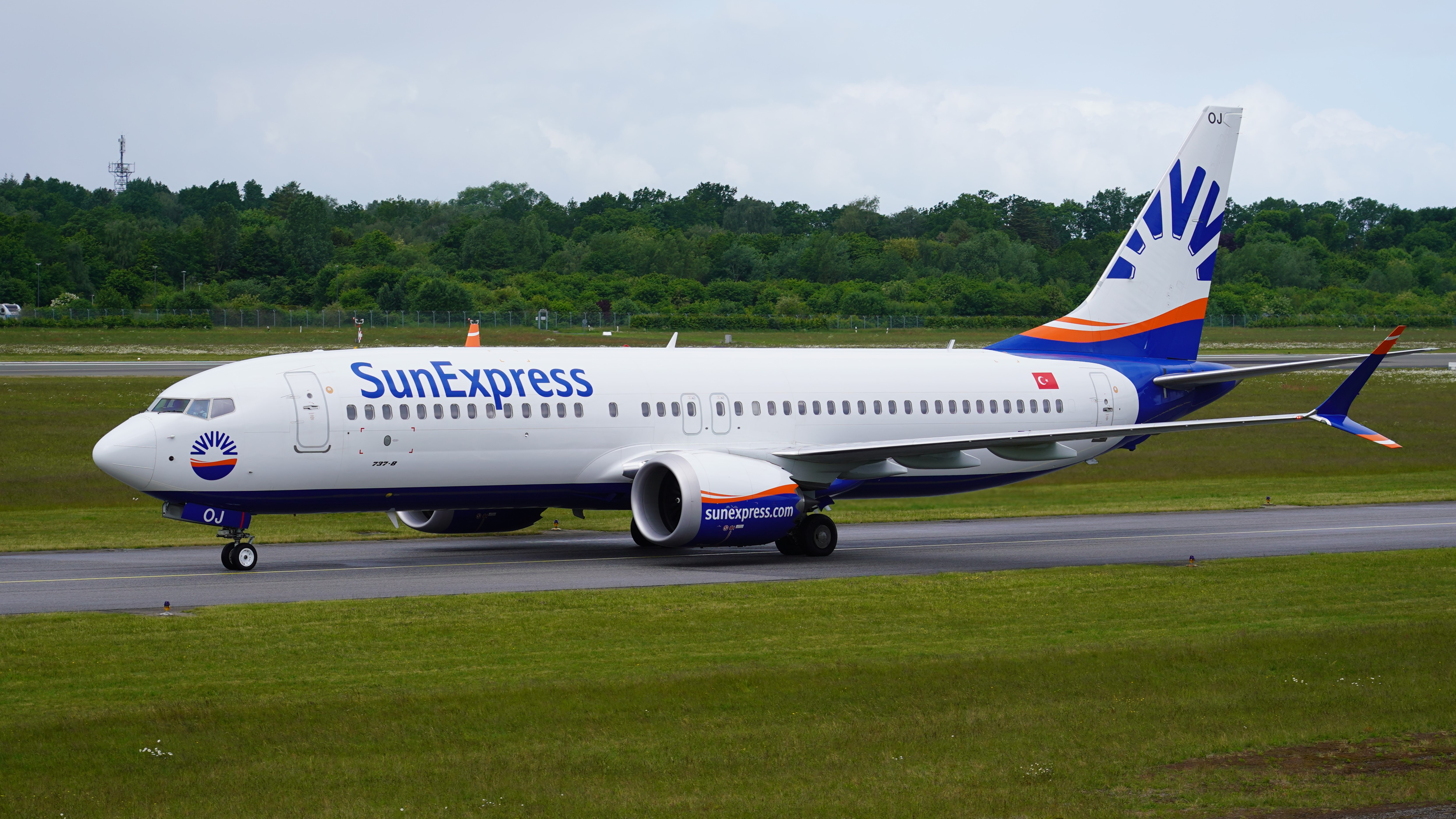
SunExpress Boeing 737 MAX 8

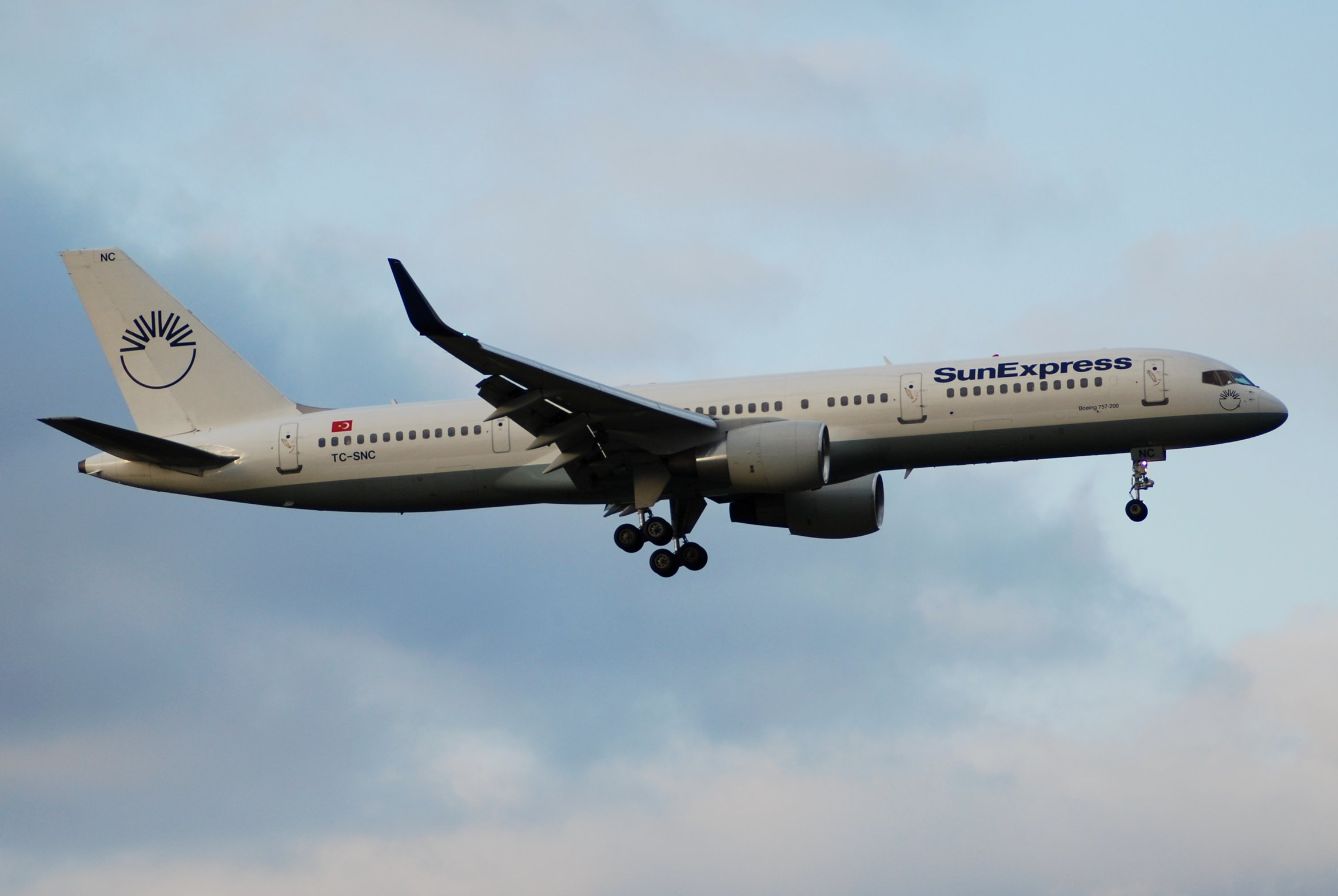
A former SunExpress Boeing 757-200 in its original livery (2007)

=== Current fleet ===
As of July 2025, SunExpress operates an all-Boeing 737 fleet composed of the following aircraft:

Aircraft	In service	Orders	Passengers	Notes
Boeing 737-800	60	—	189	
Boeing 737 MAX 8	22	53	189	Order with 45 options.
Boeing 737 MAX 10	—	17	TBA	Order with 45 options.
Total	82	70		
