= SunExpress Deutschland =

Leisure airline of Germany (2011–2020)

IATA	ICAO	Call sign
XG	SXD	SUNRISE
- Founded: 8 June 2011
- Commenced operations: 2 November 2011
- Ceased operations: 23 June 2020
- Operating bases: Cologne/Bonn; Düsseldorf; Frankfurt; Hannover; Munich; Stuttgart
- Frequent-flyer program: SunPoints
- Fleet size: 20
- Destinations: 48
- Parent company: SunExpress
- Headquarters: Frankfurt, Hesse, Germany
- Website: www.sunexpress.com

SunExpress Deutschland GmbH was a German leisure airline headquartered in Gateway Gardens, Flughafen, Frankfurt, Hesse. It was a subsidiary of SunExpress, which itself is a joint-venture of Turkish Airlines and Lufthansa. Its main base was Frankfurt Airport with smaller bases at several other airports throughout Germany. The company ceased all operations in 2020.

== History ==
SunExpress Deutschland was founded on 8 June 2011 as a subsidiary of SunExpress and started operations with three Boeing 737-800s. It was founded in order to fly from Germany to the Red Sea using the German AOC. These routes have been served on 2 November 2011 for the first time and the network has since been extended to several more leisure destinations in Southern Europe and North Africa.

In February 2015, the Lufthansa Group announced that SunExpress Deutschland would be the operator of Eurowings' new long-haul operations, which are based at Cologne Bonn Airport, from November 2015. SunExpress Deutschland therefore has received leased Airbus A330-200s.

On 23 June 2020 SunExpress announced SunExpress Deutschland would cease operations in 2020 and orderly be liquidated. Its route network would partially be taken over by SunExpress and Eurowings.

== Destinations ==
=== Operated as SunExpress Deutschland ===
As of February 2018, SunExpress Deutschland operated the following routes:

Bulgaria

- Burgas – Burgas Airport
- Varna – Varna Airport

Bosnia and Herzegovina

- Sarajevo – Sarajevo International Airport

Egypt

- Hurghada – Hurghada International Airport
- Marsa Alam – Marsa Alam International Airport

Germany

- Berlin – Tegel Airport
- Cologne/Bonn – Cologne Bonn Airport (Base)
- Düsseldorf – Düsseldorf Airport (Base)
- Frankfurt – Frankfurt Airport (Base)
- Hanover – Hannover Airport (Base)
- Leipzig – Leipzig/Halle Airport
- Munich – Munich Airport (Base)
- Stuttgart – Stuttgart Airport (Base)

Greece

- Athens – Athens International Airport
- Heraklion – Heraklion International Airport

Italy

- Lamezia Terme – Lamezia Terme International Airport

Lebanon

- Beirut – Beirut–Rafic Hariri International Airport

Morocco

- Agadir – Agadir Airport

Norway

- Oslo – Oslo Airport, Gardermoen

Spain

- Madrid – Adolfo Suárez Madrid–Barajas Airport
- Barcelona – Josep Tarradellas Barcelona–El Prat Airport
- Fuerteventura – Fuerteventura Airport
- Lanzarote – Lanzarote Airport
- Palma de Mallorca – Palma de Mallorca Airport

Turkey

- Adana – Adana Şakirpaşa Airport
- Ankara – Ankara Esenboğa Airport
- Antalya – Antalya Airport
- Bodrum – Milas–Bodrum Airport
- Dalaman – Dalaman Airport
- Elazığ – Elazığ Airport
- Gaziantep – Oğuzeli Airport
- Istanbul – Sabiha Gökçen International Airport
- İzmir – Adnan Menderes Airport
- Kayseri – Erkilet International Airport
- Samsun – Samsun-Çarşamba Airport
- Trabzon – Trabzon Airport

=== Operated for Eurowings ===
As of July 2017, SunExpress Deutschland operated the following long-haul routes for Eurowings:

Barbados

- Bridgetown – Grantley Adams International Airport seasonal

Cuba

- Havana – Jose Marti International Airport
- Varadero – Juan Gualberto Gómez Airport

Dominican Republic

- Punta Cana – Punta Cana International Airport
- Puerto Plata – Gregorio Luperón International Airport

Germany

- Düsseldorf – Düsseldorf Airport Base

Jamaica

- Montego Bay – Sangster International Airport

Mauritius

- Port Louis – Sir Seewoosagur Ramgoolam International Airport

Mexico

- Cancún – Cancún International Airport

Namibia

- Windhoek – Hosea Kutako International Airport

Thailand

- Bangkok – Suvarnabhumi Airport
- Phuket – Phuket International Airport

United States

- Fort Myers – Southwest Florida International Airport
- Las Vegas – Harry Reid International Airport
- Miami – Miami International Airport
- Orlando – Orlando International Airport
- Seattle – Seattle/Tacoma International Airport

== Fleet ==
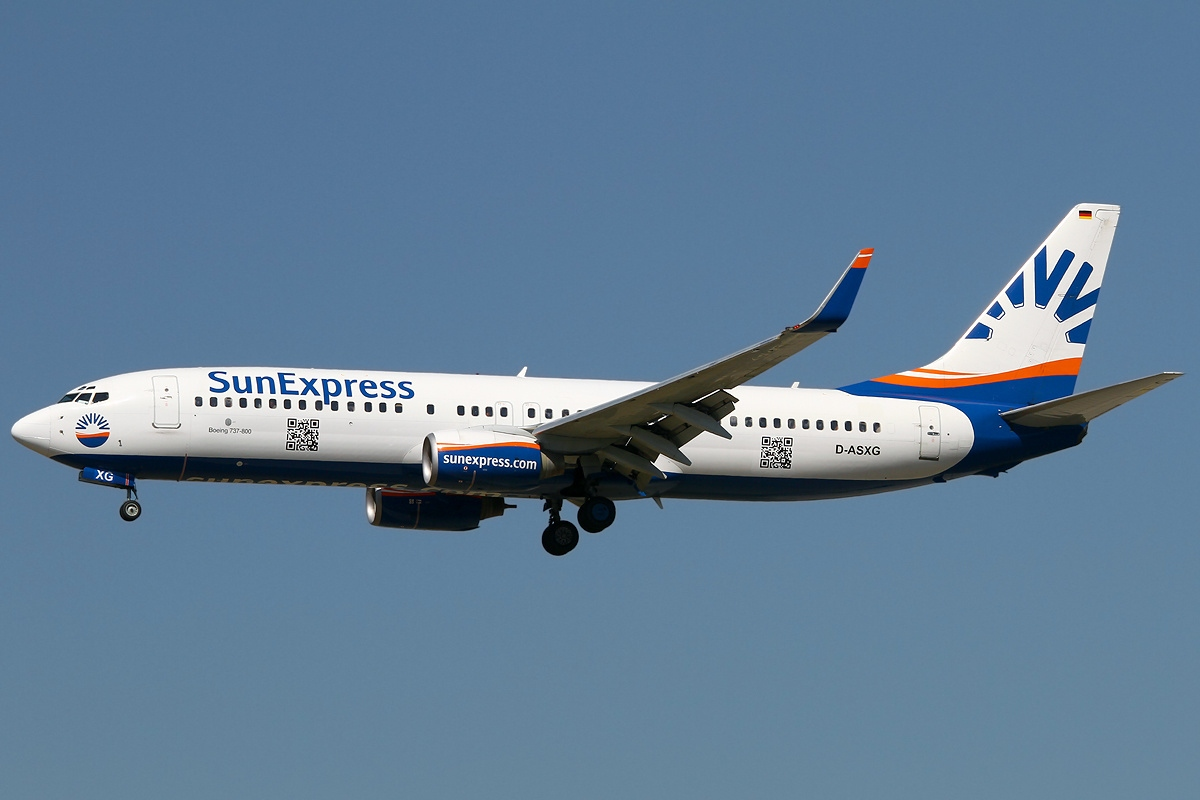
SunExpress Deutschland Boeing 737-800

As of January 2020, SunExpress Deutschland operated the following aircraft:

SunExpress Deutschland Fleet
Aircraft	In Service	Passengers			Notes
Aircraft	In Service	C	Y	Total	Notes
Airbus A330-200	7	21	289	310	Operated for Eurowings
Boeing 737-800	13	—	189	189	D-ASXB in Eintracht Frankfurt special livery.
Total	20				
