= Eurowings =

German low-cost airline

Eurowings GmbH

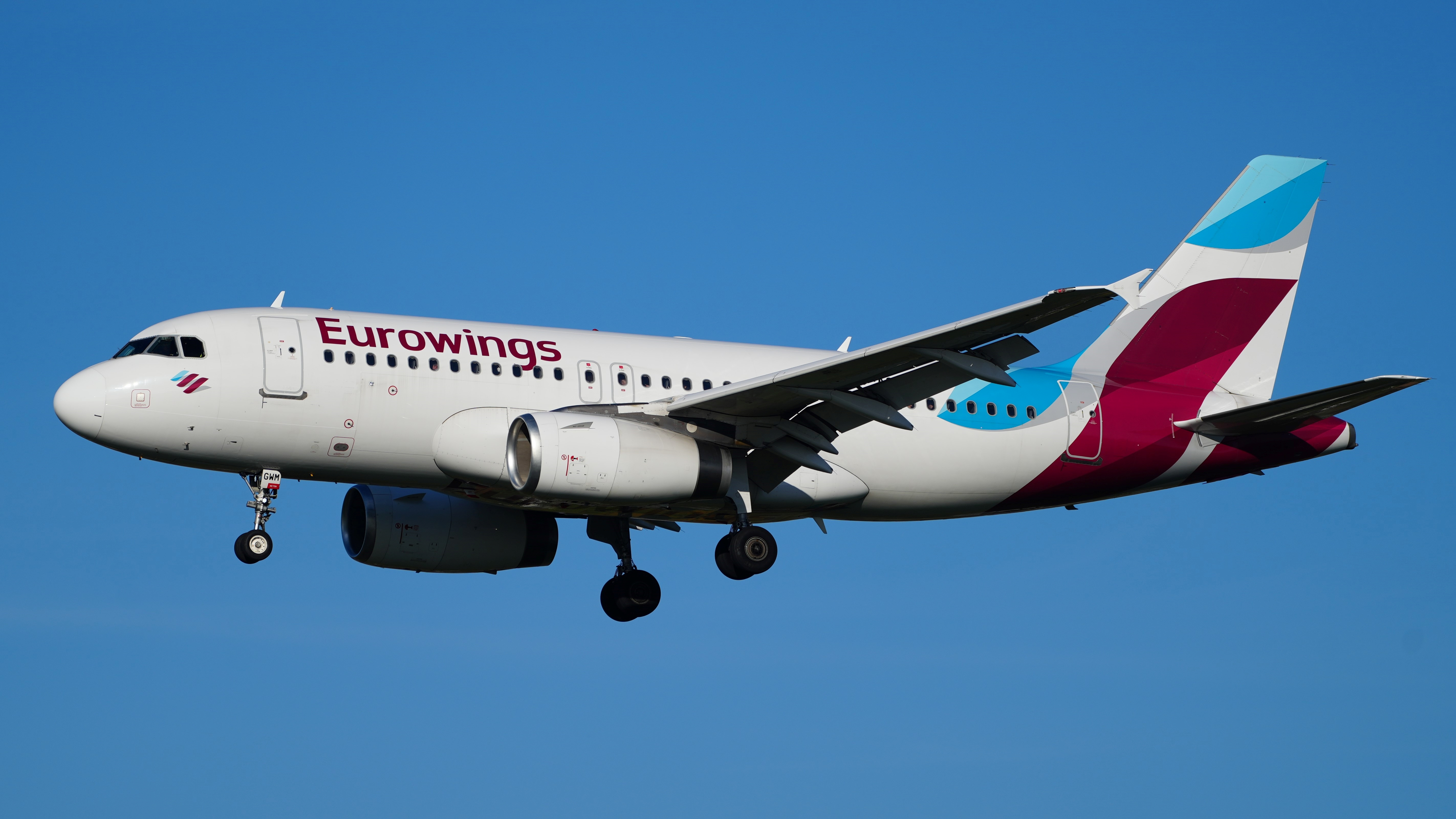
- A Eurowings Airbus A319
IATA	ICAO	Call sign
EW	EWG	EUROWINGS
- Founded: 1 February 1993; 33 years ago
- Commenced operations: 1 January 1994; 32 years ago
- Operating bases: Berlin Brandenburg; Cologne/Bonn; Dortmund; Düsseldorf; Hamburg; Hannover; Nuremberg; Prague; Stuttgart
- Frequent-flyer program: Miles & More
- Subsidiaries: Eurowings Europe
- Fleet size: 90 (excluding Eurowings Europe)
- Destinations: 152
- Parent company: Lufthansa Group
- Headquarters: Düsseldorf, North Rhine-Westphalia, Germany
- Key people: F. W. Weitholz (chair); Jens Bischof (CEO) - 31 Dec. 2025; Max Kownatzki (CEO) - starting 1 Feb. 2026
- Website: www.eurowings.com

Eurowings GmbH is a German low-cost carrier headquartered in Düsseldorf, North Rhine-Westphalia, and a wholly owned subsidiary of the Lufthansa Group. Proposed as early as 1990, but formally founded in 1993, it serves a network of domestic and European destinations and maintains bases at several airports throughout Germany, Austria and the Czech Republic. As of 2024, it is the largest low-cost-carrier in the German market.

Eurowings underwent a major transformation in October 2014 when it ceased to be a part of Lufthansa Regional. At that time, it began operating on behalf of Germanwings within their network. Since spring 2015, Eurowings has been redeveloped into a value carrier for short- and long-haul flights. By October 2015, it had also started to incorporate Germanwings' route network as part of the merger of the two brands.

Eurowings operates from bases in Germany, and its Maltese subsidiary Eurowings Europe operates from bases in other European countries. All flights operated by both carriers are scheduled, marketed and sold by Eurowings.

== History ==
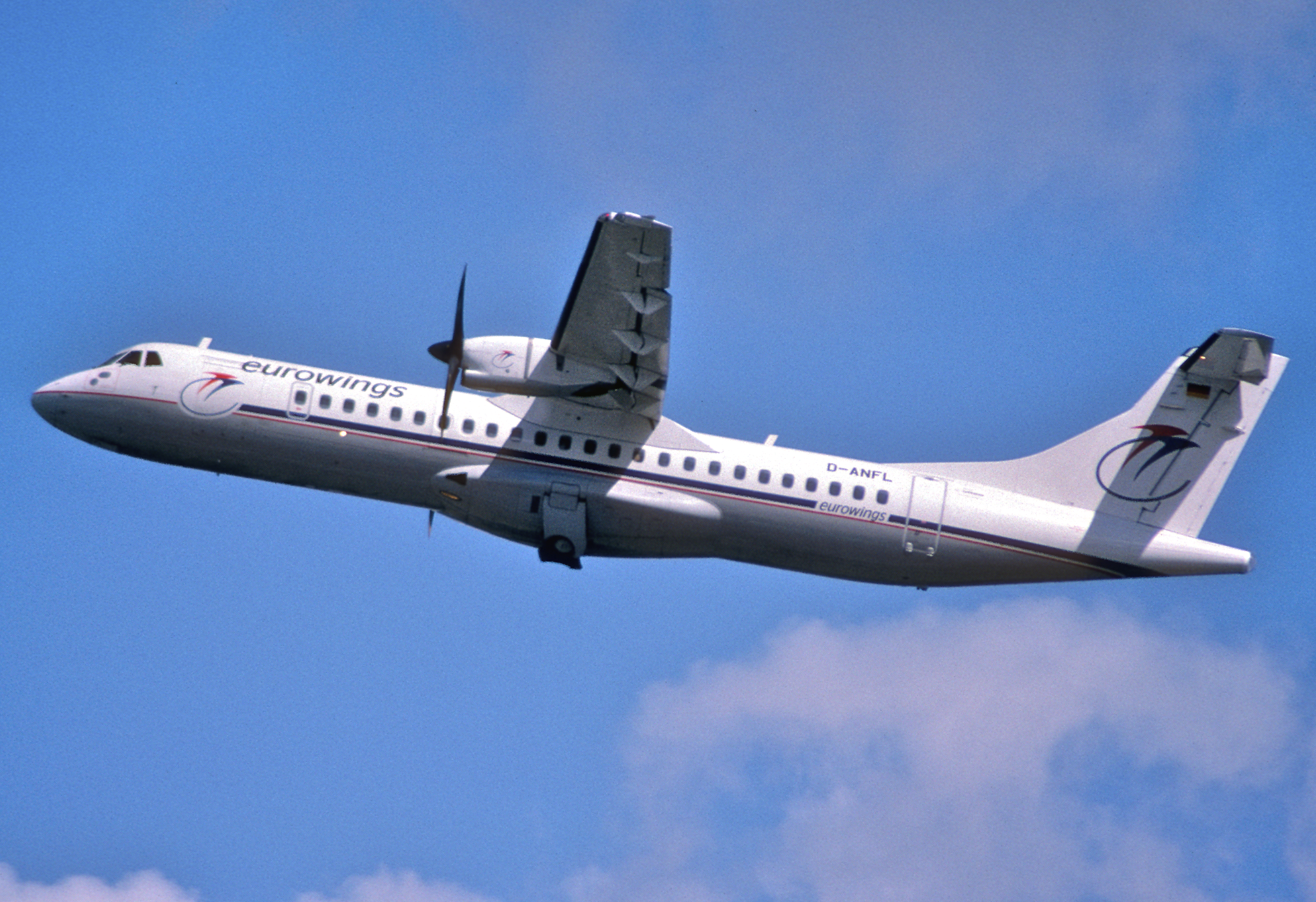
A former Eurowings ATR 72-500 wearing its own branding in 2004

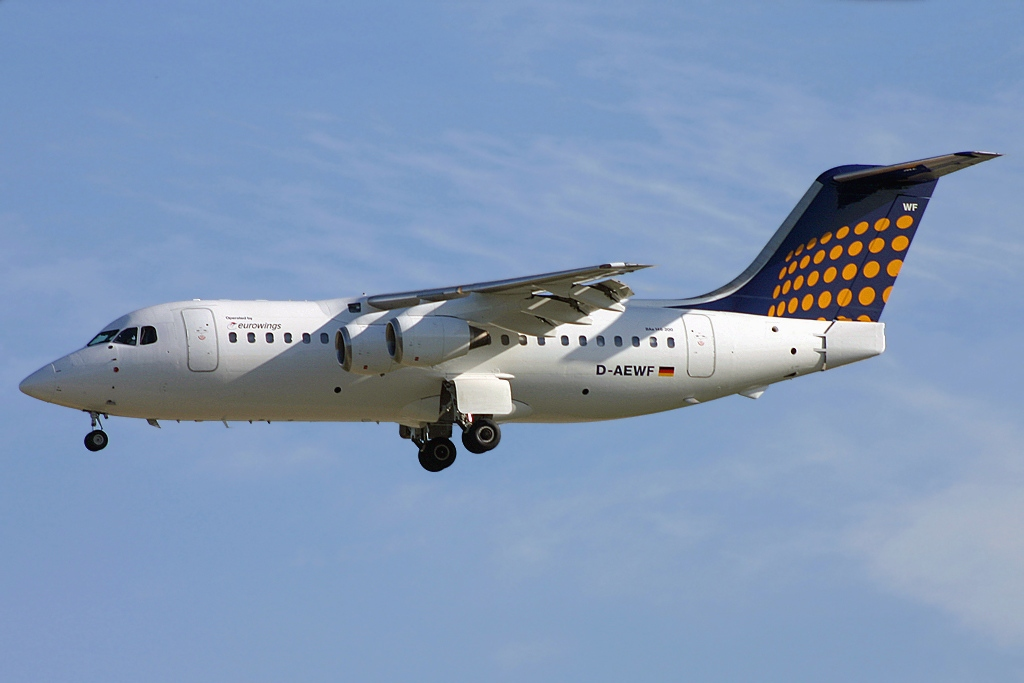
A former Eurowings BAe 146-200 operated on behalf of Lufthansa Regional in 2007

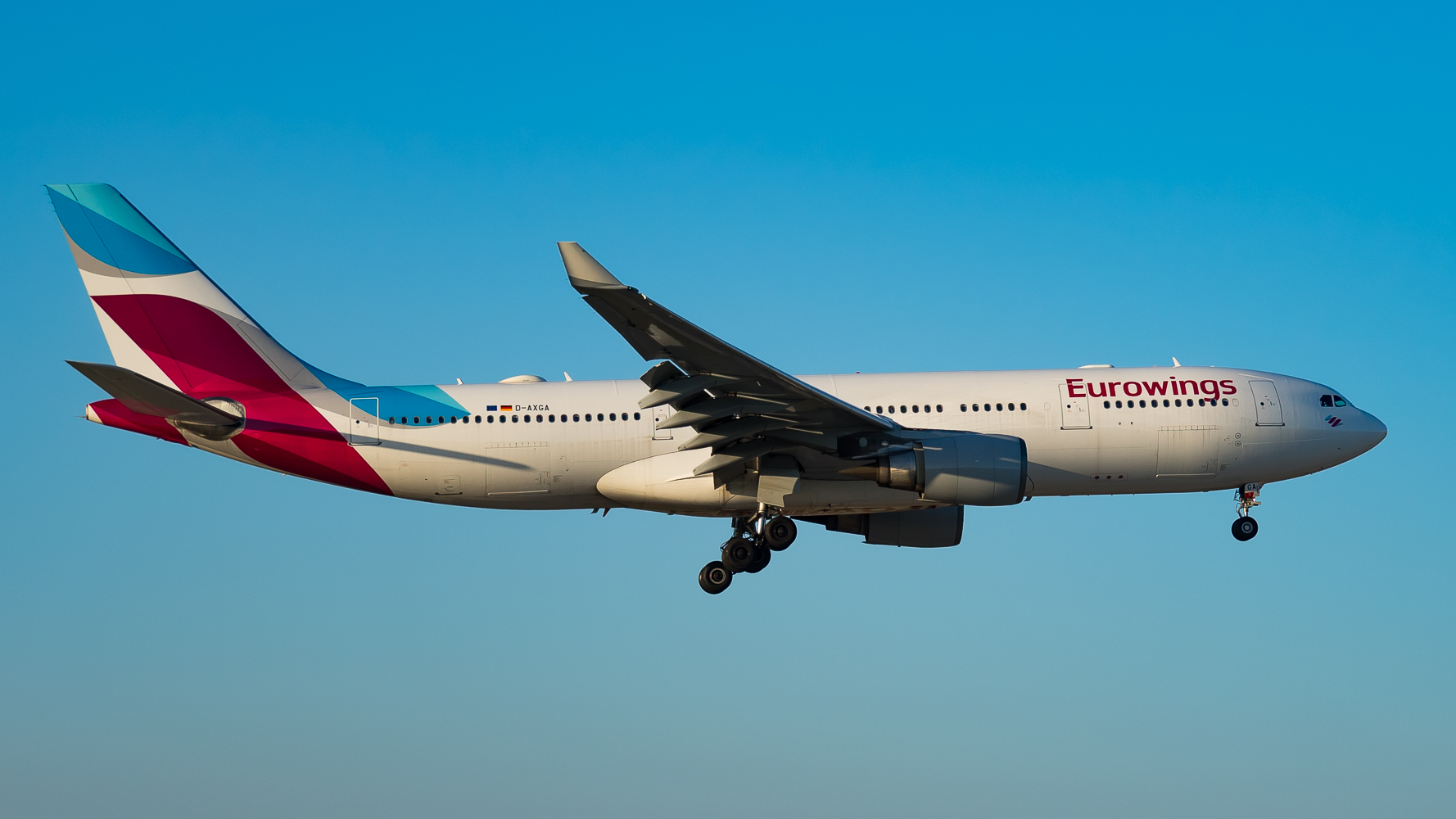
A former Eurowings Airbus A330-200 operated by now defunct SunExpress Deutschland in 2017

=== Early years ===
The airline was formed on 1 February 1990, following a merger of Nürnberger Flugdienst (NFD) and Reise und Industrieflug (RFG), two commuter airlines based in Nürnberg and Dortmund, respectively. Flight operations using an initial fleet of ATR 42 and 72 aircraft inherited from Eurowings' predecessors were launched on 1 January 1994. Subsequently, BAe 146 aircraft were added to the fleet, which were later followed by larger Airbus A320 family aircraft and even an Airbus A310. Lufthansa took an initial 24.9% stake in Eurowings in 2001, increasing it to 49% in 2004. It has exercised full control of the airline since 2005, and it assumed complete ownership in 2011.

=== Development as part of Lufthansa ===
As of 31 December 2006, Lufthansa had a 49% shareholding in Eurowings with a call option for 50.91% of the remaining stakes, bringing the company into the Lufthansa Group fold. At that time, Eurowings was the owner of Germanwings, thus creating a low-cost branch within the Lufthansa trust. Plans to merge these two airlines with TUIfly (controlled by TUI Travel) into a joint and independent holding company, were brought forth during 2008, but did not materialize. Instead, Lufthansa announced in December 2008 to acquire Germanwings from Eurowings.

In September 2010 Eurowings closed its headquarters and technical infrastructure in Dortmund, Germany, and moved both to Düsseldorf, where Eurowings operated most of its flights since the airline was part of Lufthansa Regional. In March 2011, the maintenance division at Nürnberg Airport was also closed.

In late 2013, Eurowings' short-haul flights that are not operated from Frankfurt or Munich were transferred from Lufthansa to Germanwings. All Eurowings flights operated on behalf of Lufthansa Regional ceased by autumn 2014 and were rebranded to Germanwings, the last ones to and from Düsseldorf.

=== Redevelopment into a low-cost carrier ===
In July 2014, the Lufthansa Group announced that Eurowings would replace its 23 Bombardier CRJ900 aircraft with 23 Airbus A320s. Ten of the A320s would be new orders, and 13 would be transferred from Lufthansa Group orders between February 2015 and March 2017. Lufthansa also announced Eurowings' transformation from a regional airline into a low-cost long and short-haul carrier by the end of 2015.

On 1 February 2015, Eurowings started operating the Airbus A320-200, after taking delivery of its first on 20 January, which was received from Lufthansa and repainted in Eurowings' new livery. This and further A320s would be operated on behalf of Germanwings for most of 2015, until Lufthansa consolidated its low-cost operations under the new Eurowings brand by end of that year. Additionally, in February 2015, the Lufthansa Group announced that SunExpress Deutschland would be the operator of Eurowings' new long-haul operations, which were to be based at Cologne Bonn Airport from November 2015. SunExpress Deutschland therefore would receive leased Airbus A330-200s.

Eurowings also announced the establishment of its first base outside of Germany, at Vienna International Airport, where the aircraft were planned be operated by Austrian Airlines under the Eurowings brand. Previous plans to establish the first foreign base at Basel/Mulhouse were cancelled. In June 2015, the Lufthansa Group announced the application for an additional air operator's certificate (AOC) for Eurowings in Austria, called Eurowings Europe, under which all new Airbus A320-200s would be operated while the "current" German Eurowings would continue to operate the existing fleet. This was planned due to lower operational costs based on Austrian Airlines union agreements.

On 2 October 2015, Lufthansa announced a change of plans for their Vienna operations. Austrian Airlines would not operate some routes for the Eurowings brand as planned; instead, Eurowings Europe would handle all these flights itself. In October 2015, Eurowings took over 55 Germanwings routes. By April 2016, Eurowings had taken over several more routes. Eurowings has been solely responsible for all sales under the Germanwings brand since October 2015. From November 2015, Eurowings were offering one-way fares to destinations in the Caribbean and Thailand for as little as 99 euros. In December 2015, Eurowings' new long-haul operations faced severe criticism, as every fourth flight was delayed by an average of 5.8 hours, with some flights delayed more than 20 hours. Lufthansa stated that unexpected technical difficulties and a small fleet were to blame; Eurowings started its first seven long-haul routes with only one own aircraft. Shortly after, Eurowings again faced severe public outrage and negative media coverage, after one of their flights from Varadero to Cologne was delayed by more than 60 hours with passengers with visas whose validity had run out stuck in their hotels.

In January 2016, Eurowings cancelled their planned service from Cologne to Tehran, and reduced Dubai flights from year-round to seasonal service. Lufthansa also announced the establishment of a task force in the same month. Its brief would be to eliminate the operational problems which lead to serious delays and to increase operational reliability. In July 2016, it was made public that Eurowings' owner Lufthansa was considering taking over part of the route network, staff and aircraft leases from Air Berlin, which would then be made part of the Eurowings operations. In August 2016, Eurowings announced further changes to its long-haul operations. The routes to Boston and to Dubai, which had already been changed from year-round to seasonal, were terminated. Boston was only served for three months. Shortly after, Eurowings also announced it would terminate its last route to Moscow, and therefore Russia, due to low demand. Also in August 2016, Eurowings announced it would open its second Austrian base after Vienna, at Salzburg Airport, with flights to six European metropolitan destinations from January 2017. In December 2016, it was announced that Air Berlin would wet-lease a total of 38 Airbus A319/A320 aircraft for six years to Lufthansa Group's Eurowings (33 aircraft) and Austrian Airlines (five), starting from February 2017. As a result, Eurowings will phase out Germanwings' older A320s.

On 15 February 2017, Eurowings retired their last Bombardier CRJ900 after a flight from Karlsruhe to Hamburg. All CRJ900s have been handed over to Lufthansa CityLine and replaced by larger Airbus A320-200s, as part of the transformation from a regional into a low-cost carrier.

In February 2018, Eurowings announced the relocation of all its long-haul routes currently operated from Cologne Bonn Airport to Düsseldorf Airport, from which it already flies long-haul routes, by late October 2018 to strengthen their presence there. This leaves Düsseldorf and Munich Airport as Eurowings' long-haul bases.

=== Recent developments ===
==== 2019 ====
In March 2019, the Lufthansa Group announced that starting in October 2019, Eurowings would introduce long-haul flights from Frankfurt Airport and further its Munich hub to expand Lufthansa's tourist-oriented presence and cooperation with these two hubs. It was announced that the original routes serviced from Frankfurt would be Mauritius, Barbados, and Windhoek, and Bangkok from Munich. However, in June 2019, the Lufthansa Group announced that Eurowings will drop all long-haul flights and instead focus on short-haul operations aboard Airbus A320-family aircraft. All long-haul flights operated by Eurowings will be transferred to other network airlines- Lufthansa, Brussels Airlines, Austrian Airlines, and Swiss. It was also announced that Brussels Airlines will work more closely with its network partners under a turnaround plan introduced by Lufthansa.

==== 2020 ====
In April 2020, Lufthansa announced a major downsizing for Eurowings in the wake of the COVID-19 pandemic. While Germanwings has been shut entirely and Eurowings is to phase out several aircraft, most wet-lease contracts have been ended on short notice. Amongst the terminated agreements was the largest one with German Airways (formerly LGW) for their entire Bombardier DHC-8-400 fleet.

==== 2021 ====
In February 2021, Lufthansa announced it would take over most of Eurowings' routes at Munich Airport with the exception of few domestic services and flights to Palma de Mallorca and Pristina. Also in early 2021, Eurowings discontinued all of their long-haul destinations, which had been served from Düsseldorf, Munich and Frankfurt. At the same time, parent Lufthansa announced that these routes would be spun off as new long-haul carrier Eurowings Discover. Also in 2021, Eurowings announced it would add yet another base, this time to Prague, Czech Republic.

==== 2022 ====
In May 2022, Eurowings announced the termination of its own long-running frequent flyer program Boomerang Club in favor of a merger with Miles & More of parent Lufthansa.

==== 2024 ====
In December 2024, Eurowings announced significant route cuts to its Hamburg and Dortmund bases, citing high operational costs on the German market.

==== 2025 ====
On January 15, 2025, Eurowings announced six new routes namely direct flight from Dusseldorf to Ponta Delgada, new destinations from Hanover to Bastia, Lisbon and Erbil, as well as addition of routes between Dublin-Stuttgart and Porto-Cologne/Bonn.

On January 20, 2025, Eurowings announced the largest fleet modernization program in its history, with 40 Boeing 737 MAX 8 allocated from its parent Lufthansa Group from the Group’s previous order. The first 737 MAX 8 will be arriving in 2027 and expect to deliver all of the 40 airframes by 2032, they will gradually replace the current Airbus A319-100 fleet and the older Airbus A320-200 fleet. With a capacity of 189 seats, it offers 39 additional seating capacity compared to the Airbus A319. The allocation of which AOC will receive the 737 MAX 8 has not yet been confirmed.

== Corporate affairs ==
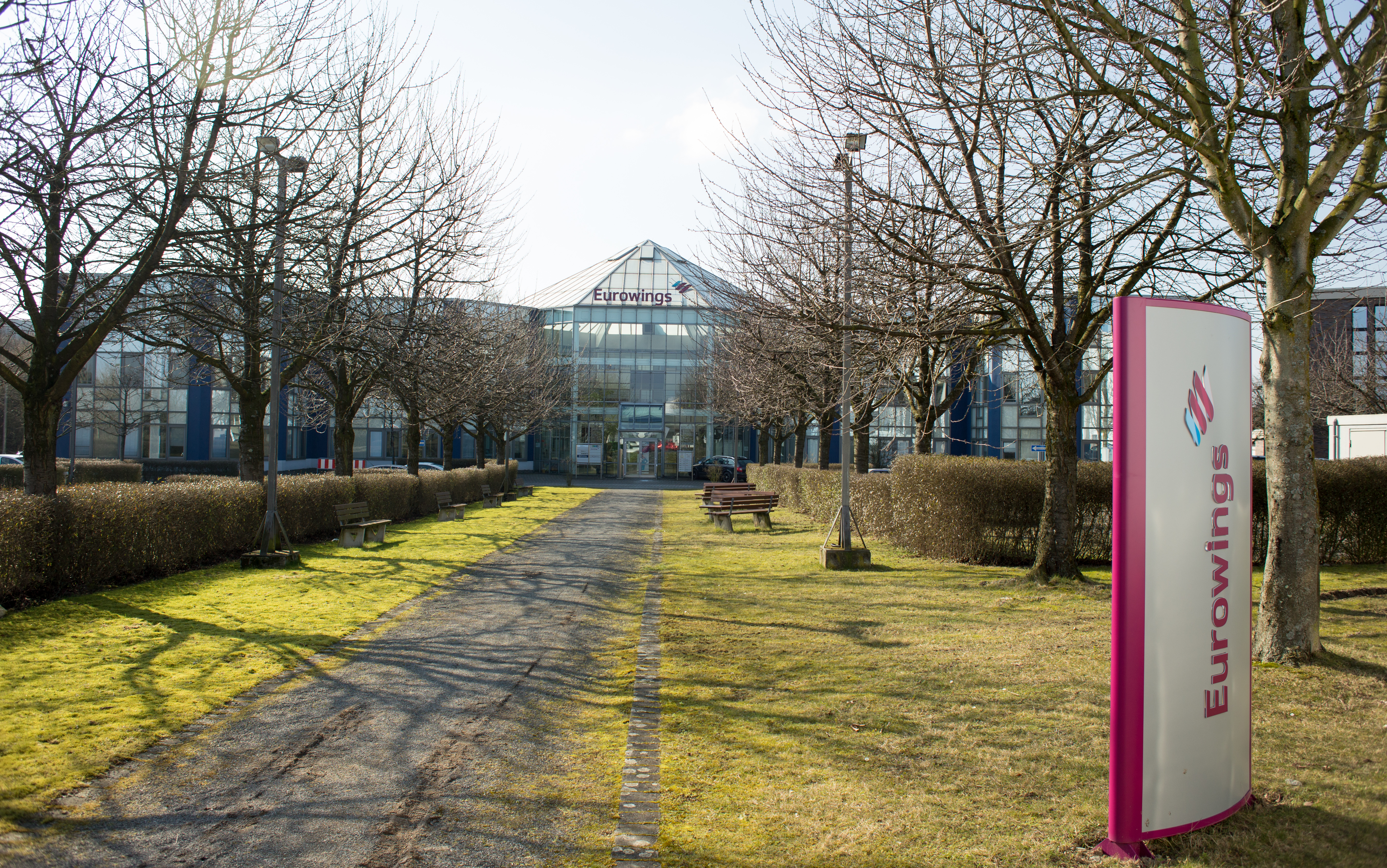
Eurowings headquarters in Düsseldorf

=== Ownership and structure ===
The Eurowings Group, which consists of low-cost or hybrid point-to-point airlines, is wholly owned by Lufthansa, and includes as subsidiaries:

- Eurowings GmbH, Düsseldorf, Germany
- Eurowings Europe Ltd, St Julian's, Malta

Integration of Brussels Airlines within Eurowings was stopped during 2019; it will instead move closer to Lufthansa Network Airlines and report as part of that operating segment from 2020.

=== Business trends ===
The business and operating results of the Eurowings Group are fully incorporated into the Lufthansa Group accounts; key trends since 2015, when it moved towards the low cost model, are (as at year ending 31 December):

	Turnover (€ m)	Operating profit "EBIT" (€ m)	Number of employees (Note: at year end)	Number of passengers (m)	Passenger load factor (%)	Number of aircraft	Notes/ references
2015	1,909	38	3,186	16.9	79.5		
2016	2,060	−91	3,493	18.4	79.6	78	
2017	4,041	−33	7,501	32.6	79.9	180	
2018	4,098	−231	9,255	38.5	81.3	205	
2019	2,311	−126	8,809	38.2	82.2	191	
2020	598	−802	3,088	7.2	73.1	85	
2021	822	−227	3,563	7.7	73.6	100	
2022	1,857	−200	4,415	16.9	80.8	96	
2023	2,592	241	4,793	20.7	84.1	100	
2024	2,872	261	5,301	22.7	84.8	100	
2025	3,077	133	5,481	23.7	84.8	98	

- The Eurowings EBIT is published together with the 50% Lufthansa stake in SunExpress annual result.

== Destinations ==
=== Codeshare agreements ===
Eurowings has codeshare agreements with the following airlines:

- Aegean Airlines
- Air Canada
- All Nippon Airways
- Austrian Airlines
- Brussels Airlines
- ITA Airways
- Lufthansa
- Singapore Airlines
- Smartwings
- SunExpress
- Swiss International Air Lines
- TUI fly Deutschland
- United Airlines
- Volotea

=== Interline agreements ===
- Hahn Air
- Scoot
- SunExpress

== Fleet ==
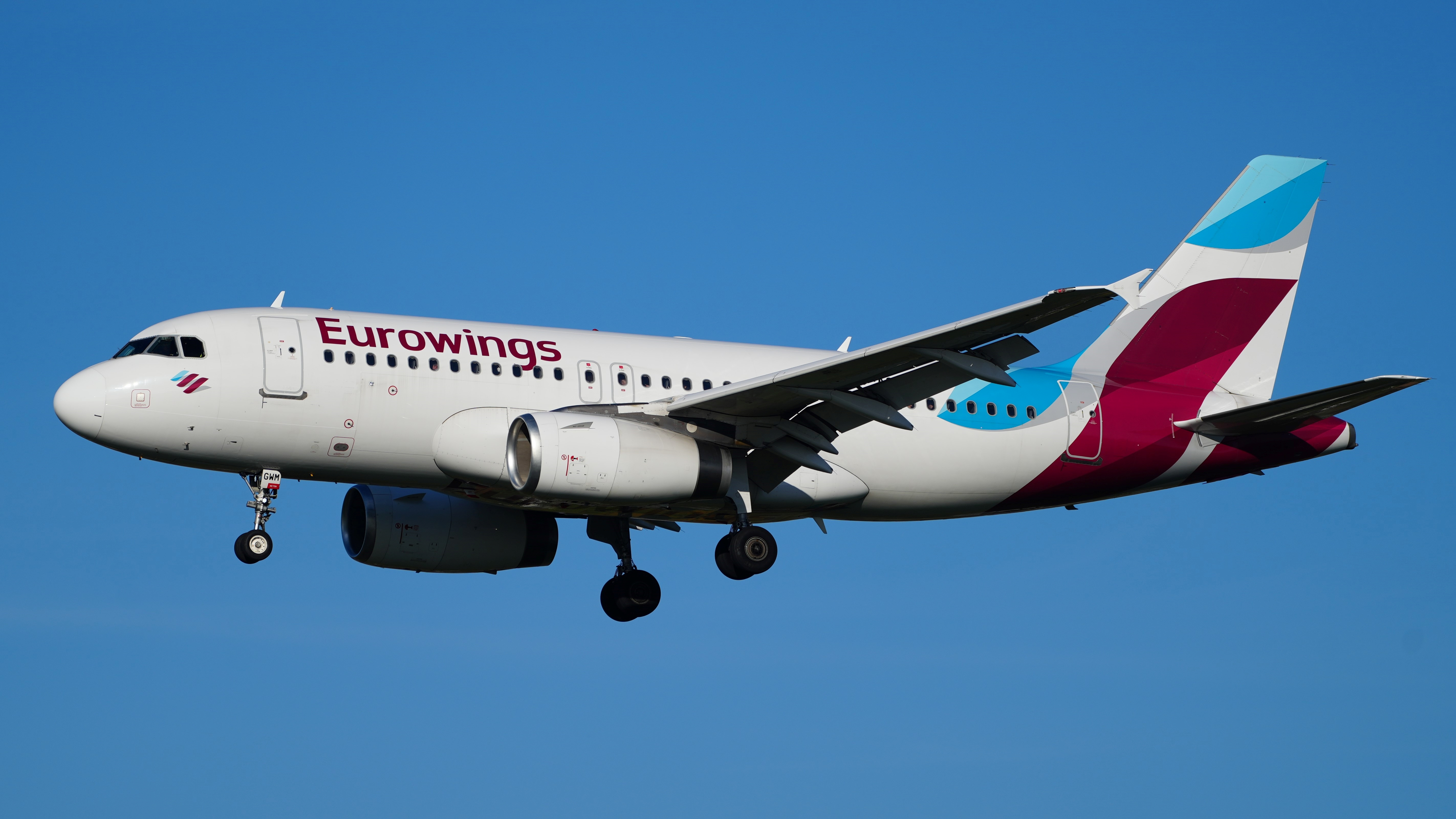
Eurowings Airbus A320

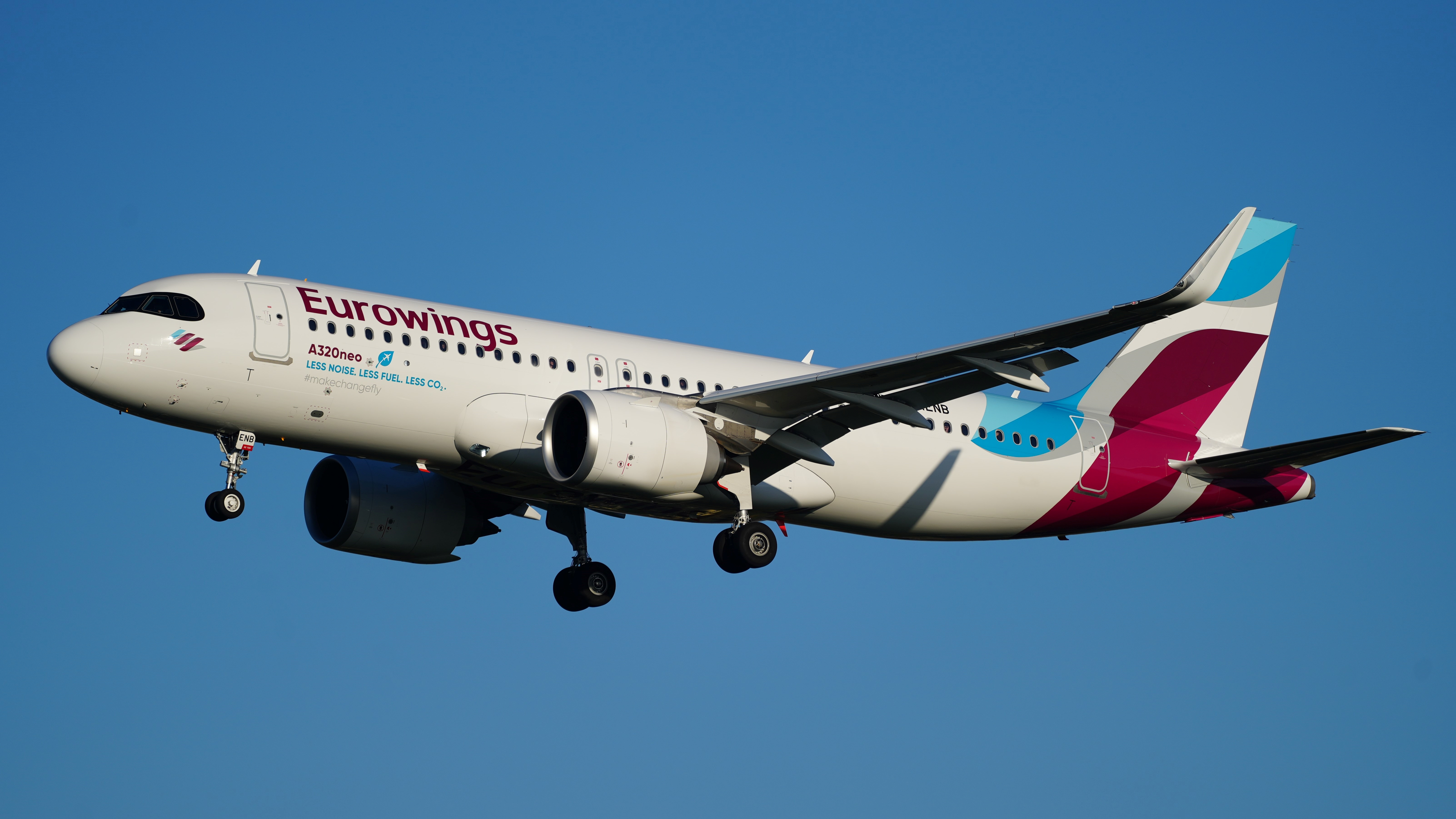
Eurowings Airbus A320neo

=== Current fleet ===
As of May 2026, Eurowings (excluding Eurowings Europe which maintains its own AOC) operates the following aircraft:

Eurowings fleet
Aircraft	In service		Orders	Passengers				Notes
Aircraft	In service		Orders	B	E+	E	Total	Notes
Airbus A319-100	23	3	—	18	42	84	144	To be replaced by Boeing 737 MAX 8. (Will be operated by Eurowings Europe)
Airbus A319-100	23	20	—	18	42	90	150	To be replaced by Boeing 737 MAX 8. (Will be operated by Eurowings Europe)
Airbus A320-200	45	13	—	18	54	108	174	Older aircraft to be replaced by Boeing 737 MAX 8.
Airbus A320-200	45	32	—	18	24	138	180	Older aircraft to be replaced by Boeing 737 MAX 8.
Airbus A320neo	8		—	18	42	120	180	
Airbus A321-200	6		—	24	40	162	226	
Airbus A321neo	5		—	18	42	172	232	
Boeing 737 MAX 8	—		40	—	—	189	189	Ordered from parent company. Deliveries between 2027 and 2032 and replace Airbus A319 and older Airbus A320-200. (Will be operated by Eurowings Europe)
Total	90		40					

=== Historical fleet ===
Over the years, Eurowings has operated the following aircraft types:

Eurowings historical fleet
Aircraft	Number	Introduced	Retired	Notes
Airbus A310	1	1994	1995	
Airbus A330-200	7	2015	2019	Operated by now-defunct SunExpress Deutschland, relocated to Discover Airlines.
Airbus A330-300	4	2015	2020	Operated by Brussels Airlines, relocated to Discover Airlines.
Airbus A340-300	2	2018	2019	Operated by Brussels Airlines, transferred back to Lufthansa.
ATR 42	29	1994	2005	
ATR 72	16	1994	2006	
British Aerospace BAe 146	18	1994	2010	
Boeing 737-300	2	2001	2003	
Boeing 737-800	2	2016	2017	Operated by now-defunct SunExpress Deutschland.
Boeing 737-800	8	2017	2020	Operated by TUI fly Deutschland.
Boeing 767-300ER	1	2017	2018	Operated by TUI fly Deutschland.
Boeing 767-300ER	1	2017	2018	Operated by PrivatAir.
Bombardier CRJ100	4	2001	2004	
Bombardier CRJ200	19	2001	2011	
Bombardier CRJ700	2	2007	2011	Transferred to Lufthansa CityLine.
Bombardier CRJ900	23	2009	2017	Transferred to Lufthansa CityLine.
De Havilland Dash 8 Q400	19	2018	2020	Operated by German Airways.
Dornier 328	1	1997	1998	

=== Special liveries ===
- As of April 2022, a Eurowings Airbus A320-200 (D-AEWM), has received a special black and yellow livery advertising the airline's sponsorship of Borussia Dortmund.
- As of 2018, a Eurowings Airbus A320-200 (D-ABDQ), has been painted in a promotional Europa Park livery.
- As of January 2019, a new Airbus A320-200 (D-ABDU), taken over from Air Berlin, received a new '100-years-of-Hertz'-special livery.
