= Germanwings =

Low-cost airline of Germany (1997–2020)

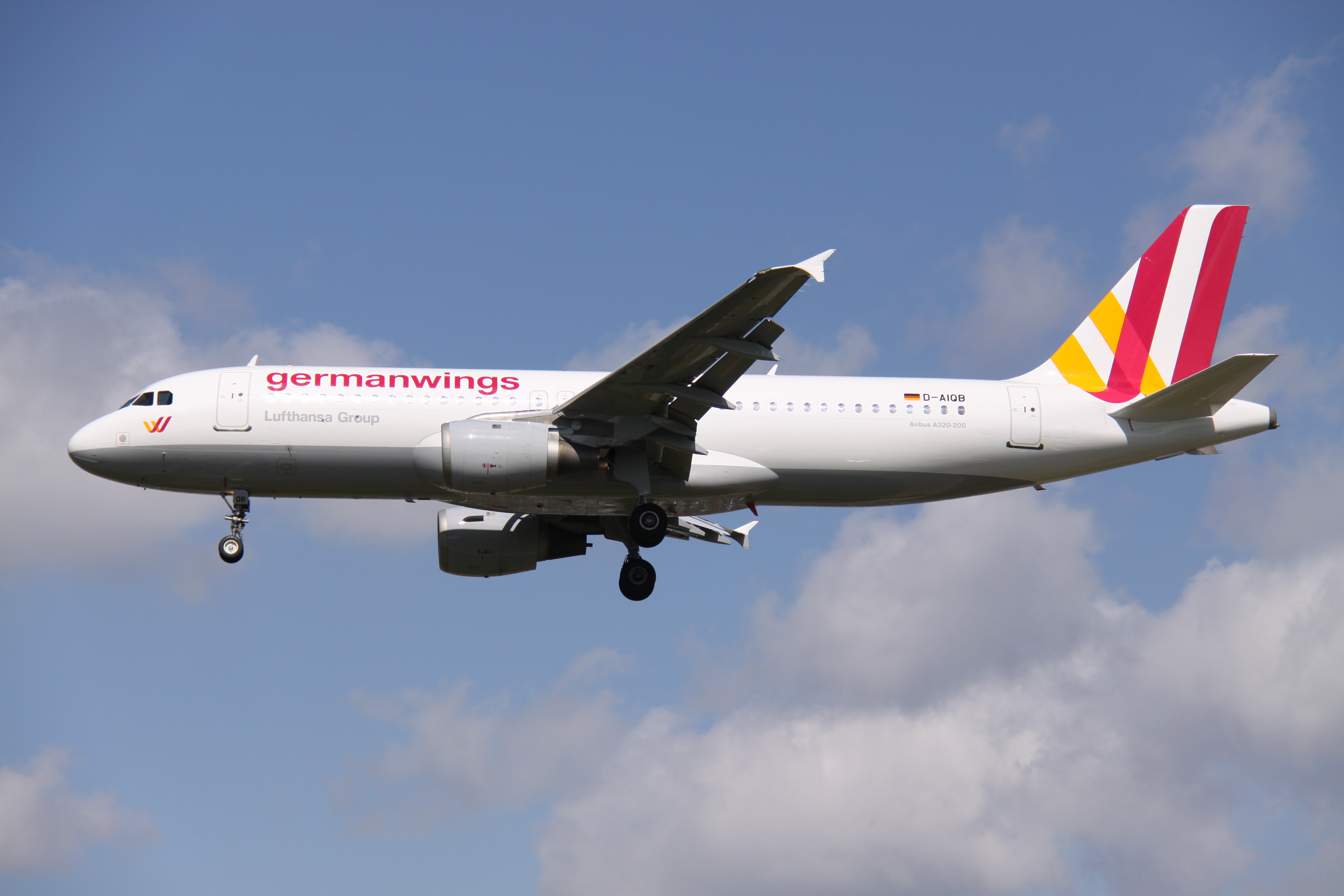
- Airbus A320
IATA	ICAO	Call sign
4U	GWI	GERMANWINGS
- Founded: 1997 as a division of Eurowings
- Commenced operations: 27 October 2002
- Ceased operations: 20 April 2020
- Operating bases: Berlin–Schönefeld; Berlin–Tegel; Cologne/Bonn; Dortmund; Hamburg; Hannover; Munich; Stuttgart
- Frequent-flyer program: Boomerang Club; Miles & More
- Fleet size: 33
- Parent company: Lufthansa Group
- Headquarters: Cologne, North Rhine-Westphalia, Germany
- Key people: Executive Board: Michael Knitter; Francesco Sciortino
- Website: www.eurowings.com

Germanwings GmbH was a German low-cost airline wholly owned by Lufthansa from January 2009 which operated under the Eurowings brand. It was based in Cologne with hubs at Cologne Bonn Airport, Stuttgart Airport, Hamburg Airport, Berlin Tegel Airport, and Munich Airport. Further bases were at Hannover Airport and Dortmund Airport.

Germanwings operated independently as Lufthansa's low-cost carrier until October 2015, when the German flag carrier decided to fully transfer its low cost short haul-product to subsidiary Eurowings. After 2016, Germanwings operated as a wet lease operator for its sister Eurowings, with the Germanwings name being phased out. The IATA code 4U continued to operate under the Eurowings brand until March 2018, when it was abandoned and replaced with the Eurowings designator EW. Germanwings was closed and merged back into Eurowings in April 2020 as part of a broad restructuring during the COVID-19 pandemic.

== History ==
=== Early years ===
Logo used until 2013

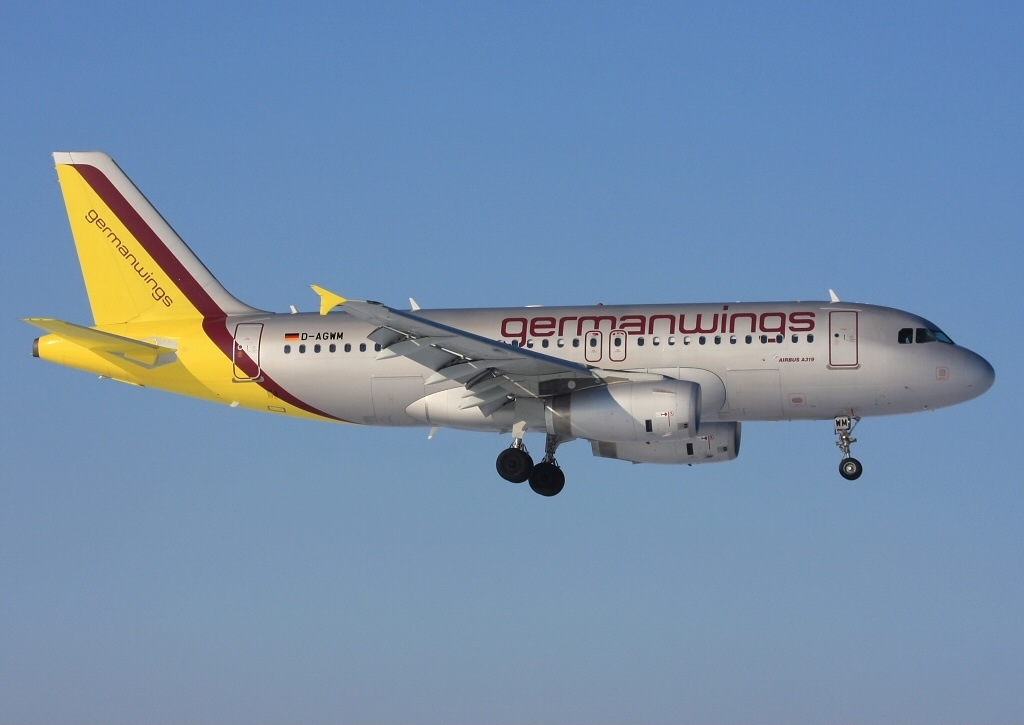
Airbus A319-100 in the first livery, in 2010

In 1997, Eurowings set up a low-cost department, which became a separate company under the name Germanwings GmbH on 27 October 2002. On 7 December 2005, the airline signed an agreement to purchase 18 Airbus A319-100 aircraft with a further 12 options, with deliveries scheduled from July 2006 until 2008. During winter 2004–05, Germanwings leased two Boeing 717-200s to test the aircraft type, but no purchase order was made afterwards.

In 2008, initial plans were made to merge Germanwings, Eurowings and TUIfly into one airline to compete with Air Berlin and its subsidiary LTU in the German market and with easyJet and Ryanair on international routes. However, these plans were never realized. Instead, Germanwings became a wholly owned subsidiary of Lufthansa on 1 January 2009.

=== Takeover of Lufthansa routes from 2012 ===
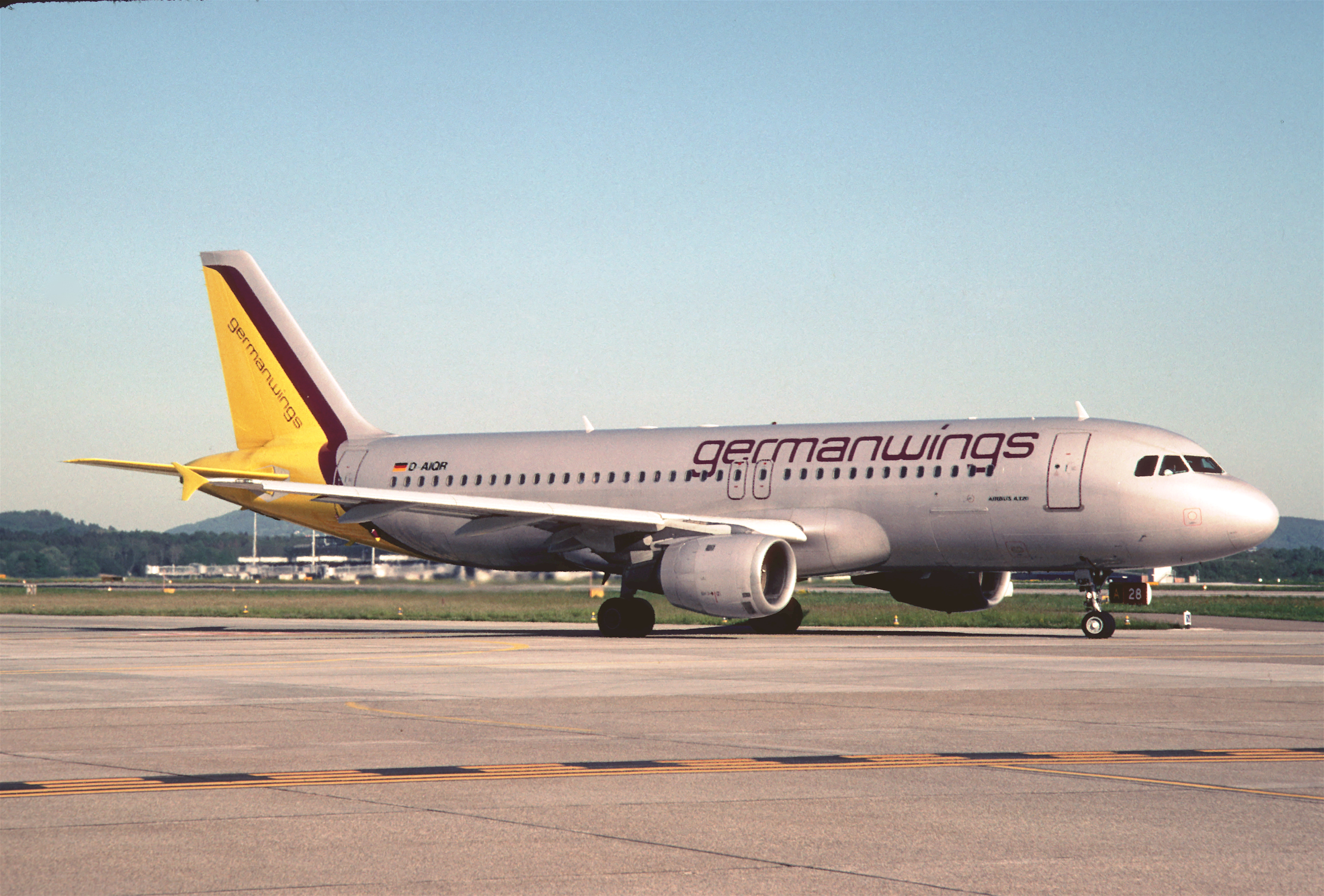
Airbus A320-211

In 2012, Lufthansa announced its plans to transfer point-to-point shorthaul flights operating from cities other than Frankfurt and Munich from Lufthansa to Germanwings. Therefore, the company received a revised corporate design. These transfers were made between spring 2013 and autumn 2014; Düsseldorf Airport was the last airport transferred from March 2014.

As part of the 2013 restructuring and relaunch of Germanwings, approximately 30 Lufthansa aircraft were to be added to Germanwings' fleet of 33 aircraft. Additionally, the 23 aircraft currently operated by Eurowings for Lufthansa flights not flying out of Frankfurt and Munich were to join Germanwings. The new Germanwings was to operate around 90 aircraft.

The airline had a long-standing dispute with the Vereinigung Cockpit union, which demanded a plan in which pilots can retire at the age of 55 and retain 60% of their pay, which parent Lufthansa insists was not affordable. Germanwings pilots staged a nationwide strike in support of their demands in April 2014, which lasted 3 days. The pilots staged a six-hour strike in September 2014. Simultaneous strikes were staged by Lufthansa pilots.

By the end of 2014, all of Lufthansa's national routes and international traffic to and from Germany, except flights to and from Frankfurt and Munich and the routes from Düsseldorf to Newark and Chicago, were transferred to Germanwings. The last route to be transferred was Düsseldorf–Zurich on 8 January 2015.

=== Integration into Eurowings from 2015 ===
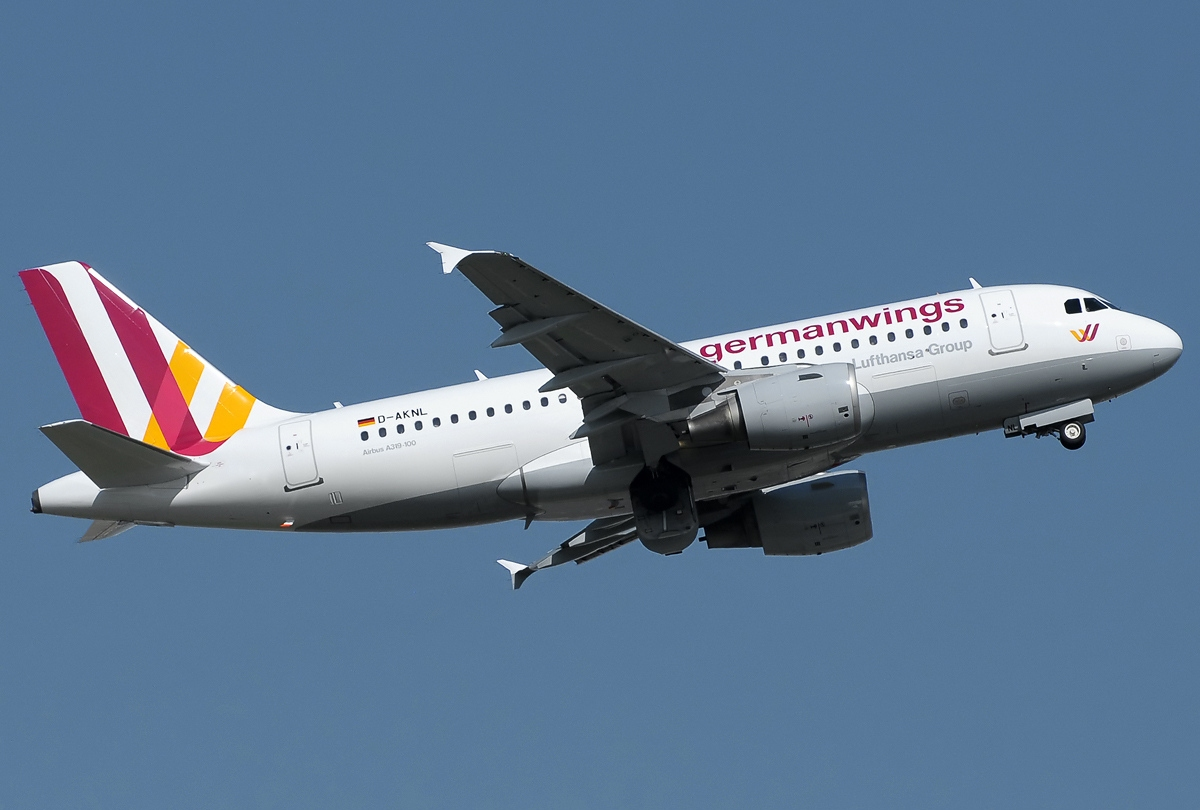
An Airbus A319-100 in the second livery introduced in 2013

In January 2015, Lufthansa Group announced that it would discontinue the Germanwings brand and replace it with Eurowings starting in late 2015.

On 25 October 2015, Eurowings took over 55 routes previously operated under the Germanwings brand. The first Germanwings bases to be mostly taken over by Eurowings were Düsseldorf Airport, Hamburg Airport - at both of which Eurowings already operated on behalf of Germanwings - and Cologne Bonn Airport.

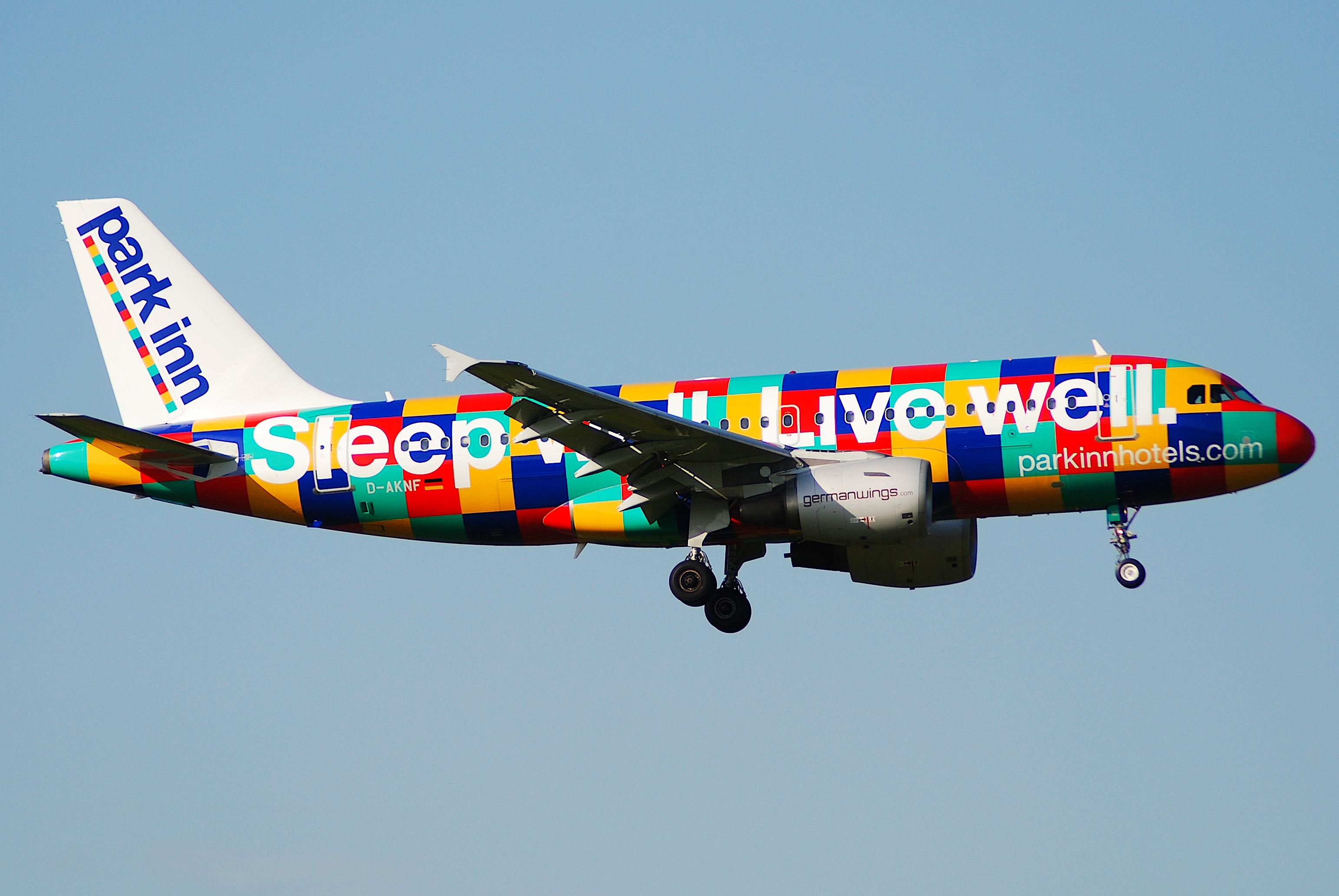
An Airbus A319-100 wearing a promotional Park Inn Hotels livery

Lufthansa announced in October 2015 that Germanwings' own website would be dissolved and redirected to Eurowings by January 2016 as part of their merger. However, Germanwings continued to operate as a company. From that date, Eurowings became solely responsible for all sales under the Germanwings brand. In January 2016, Germanwings' social media profiles, such as those on Facebook and YouTube, were renamed Eurowings, while germanwings.com was redirected to eurowings.com. However, Germanwings continued to operate under its own flight numbers, but used the Eurowings brand.

In December 2016, it was announced that Germanwings would retire 20 aircraft during 2017 without replacement due to Lufthansa's new wet-lease deal with Air Berlin which also provided services for Eurowings. It was reported that the Air Berlin aircraft were newer and cheaper to operate than those of Germanwings.

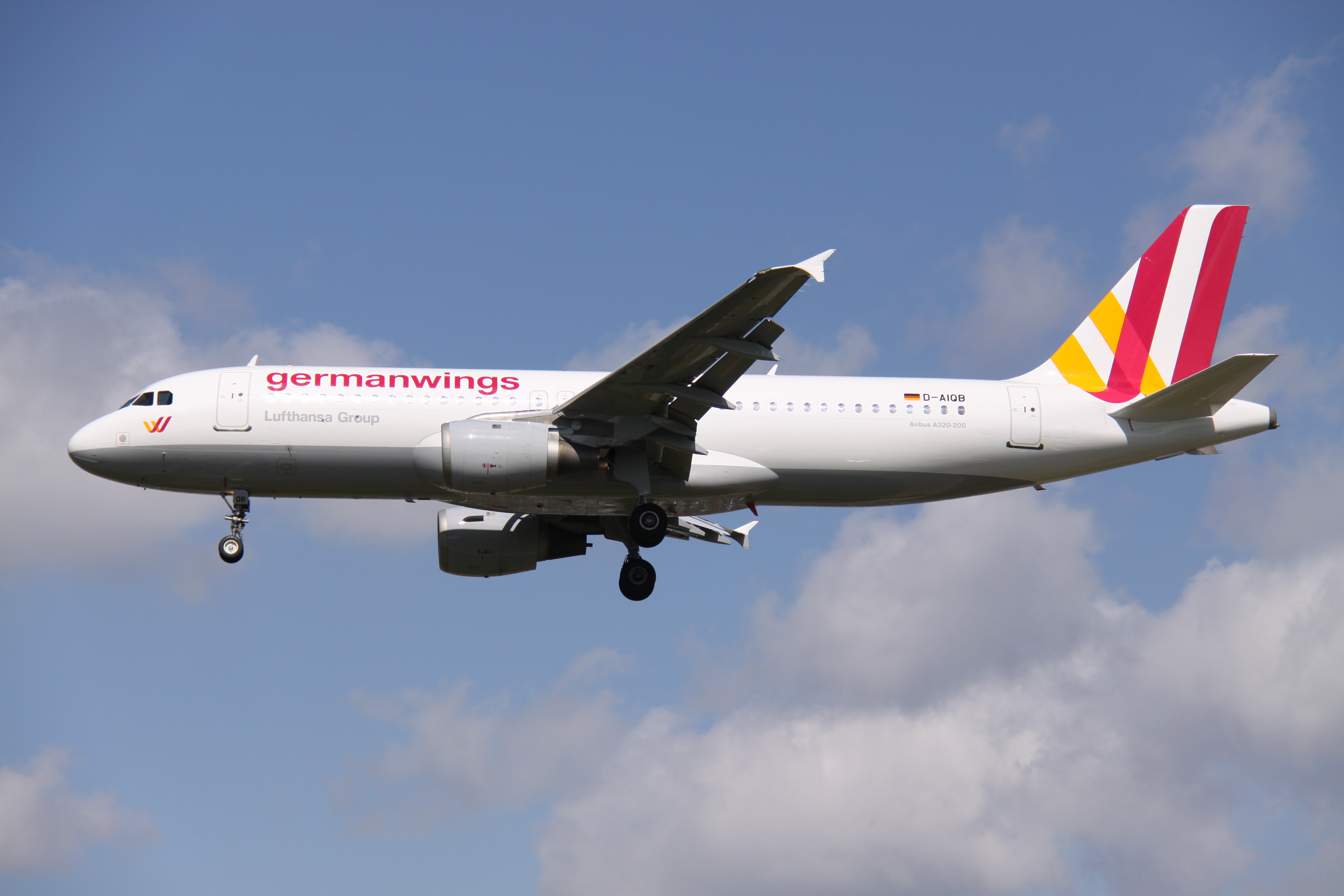
Airbus A320

In August 2017, it was announced that Germanwings would abandon its own IATA code 4U by 25 March 2018. Since then, it has used Eurowings' EW code on for all operations, which are already carried out under the Eurowings brand.

In October 2019, the Pristina base, which had been operated by Germanwings since June 2019, was transferred to Eurowings Europe. In return, Germanwings took over the German base in Munich which had been operated by its sister airline.

On 7 April 2020, Lufthansa announced that it would be shutting down Germanwings, partly due to the large travel ban during the COVID-19 pandemic. All flight activities were halted on 20 April.

== Corporate affairs ==
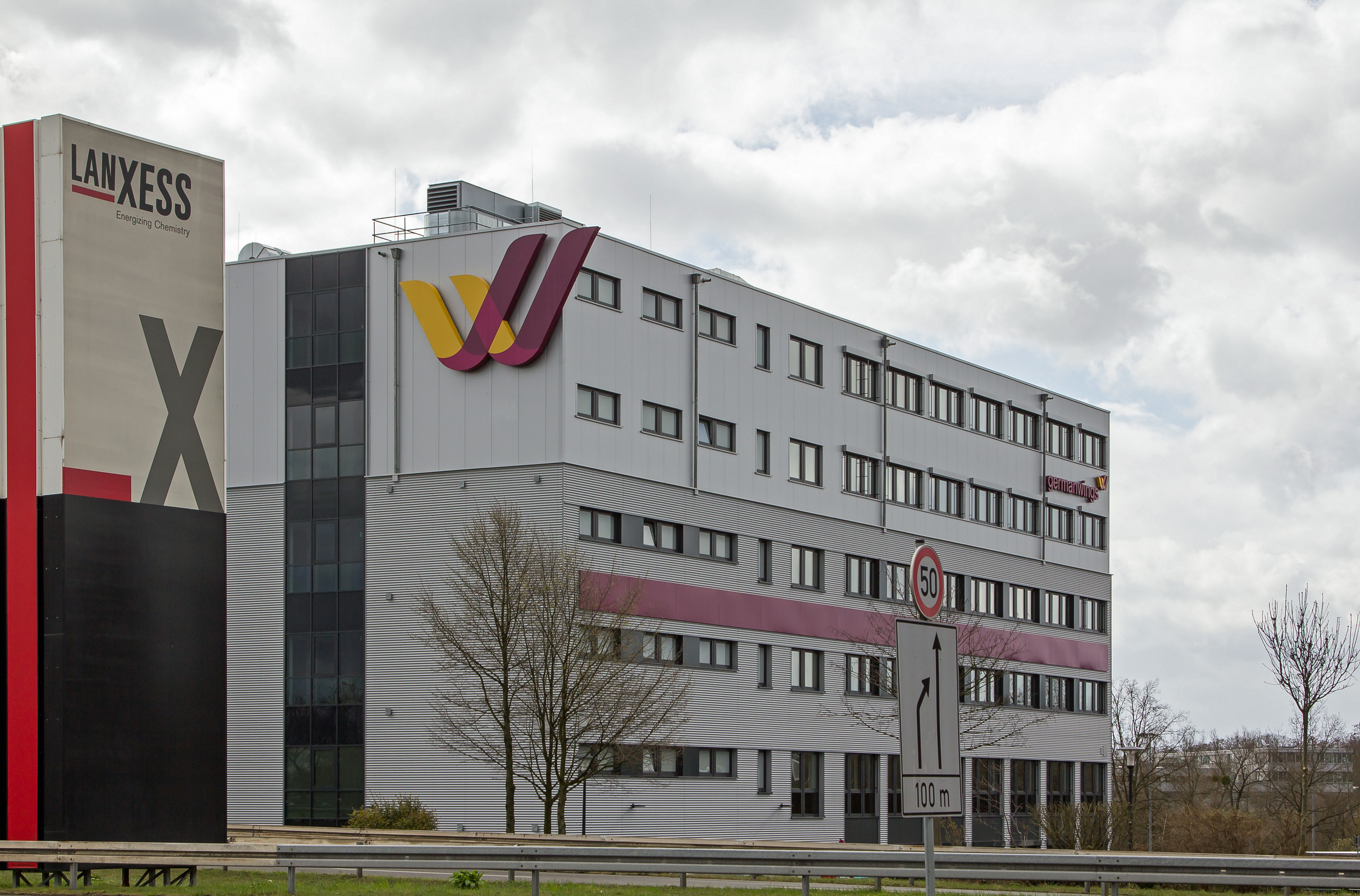
Head office in Cologne

=== Service concept ===
Germanwings had offered three fare types since 2013. Basic was no-frills and offered no inclusive catering and only hand luggage. Best included hold baggage, inclusive snacks and drinks as well as access to some lounges for tier members of Miles&More. Smart and Best more or less corresponded to the Lufthansa service offered on the routes taken over by Germanwings. The fleet was only equipped with economy class.

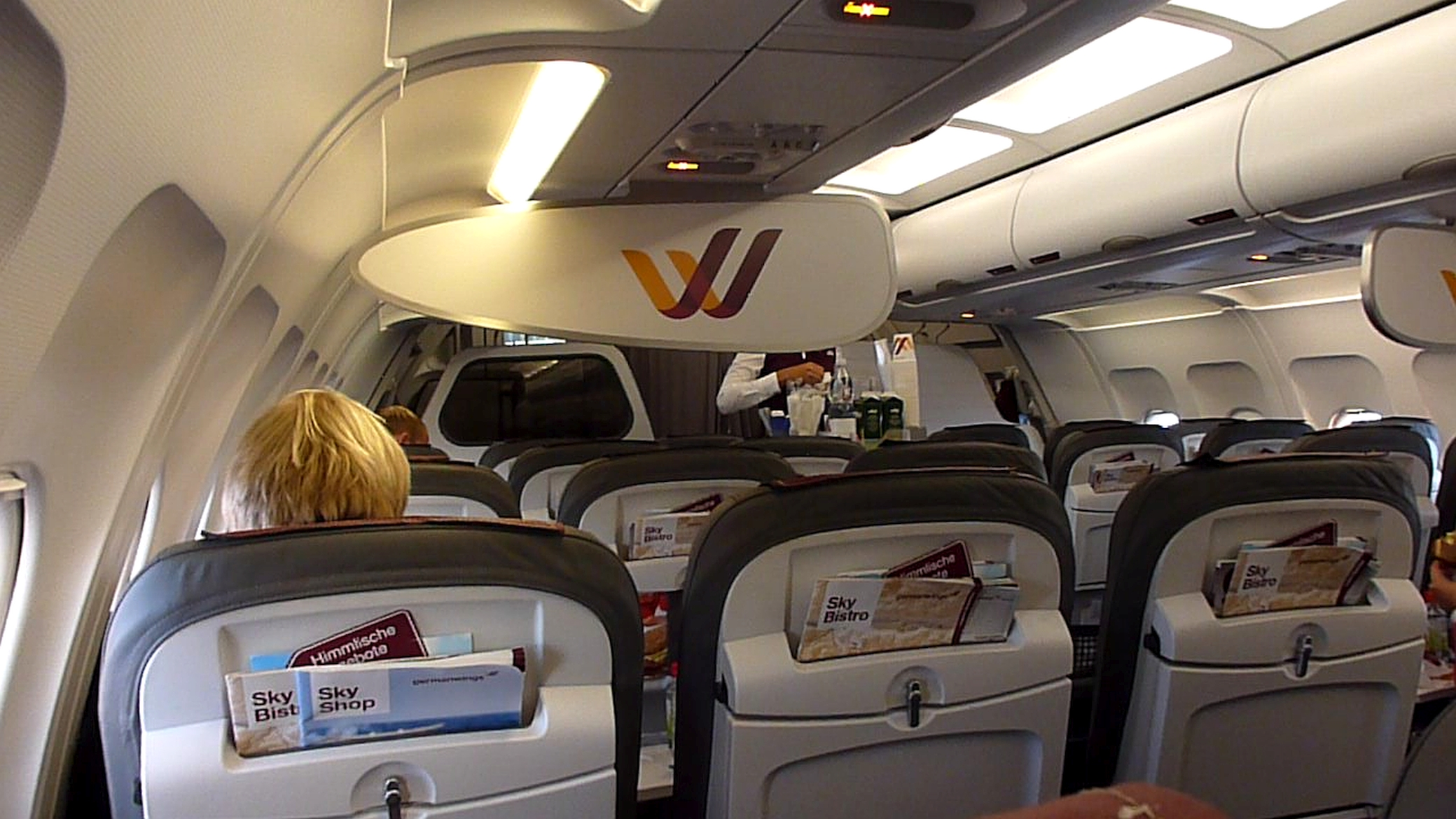
Aircraft cabin

Germanwings offered Sky Bistro (Bord Shop in German), a buy on board food and drinks programme. The airline provided an inflight magazine, a bi-monthly German and English magazine called GW. While the primary editorial focus was rooted in Germanwings destinations, the content was not exclusively about travel.

Germanwings booking service provided Blind Booking, a unique option that allowed passengers to choose one of Germanwings' base airports, select a category of destination (e.g. Party, Gay-friendly or Culture) and then purchase a round-trip ticket via a random lottery process from among the cities in the category. Such tickets were often priced lower than the corresponding ticket to the same destination, and Germanwings e-mails its customers with details of their destination shortly after the purchase.

=== Business trends ===
Germanwings had been wholly owned by Lufthansa since 1 January 2009; formal reporting since then had been within the Group Accounts. From 2012, Germanwings figures had been reported only within the 'Lufthansa Passenger Airline Group', and have not generally been available separately. The key known trends for Germanwings are shown below (as at year ending 31 December):

	2008	2009	2010	2011	2012	2013	2014	2015
Turnover (€m)	628	580	630	687	n/a	n/a	Separate data no longer available	
Profits (EBITDA) (€m)	39	63	−9	−15	n/a	n/a	Separate data no longer available	
Number of employees (at year end)	1,046	1,111	1,272	1,274	1,352	2,073	Separate data no longer available	
Number of passengers (m)	7.6	7.2	7.7	7.5	7.8	16	Separate data no longer available	
Passenger load factor (%)	n/a	n/a	77.2	78.2	n/a	n/a	Separate data no longer available	
Number of aircraft (at year end)	25	26	30	30	32	67	84	62
Notes/sources								

In line with Lufthansa's declared business strategy, the transfer of European non-hub traffic from Lufthansa Passenger Airlines to Germanwings continued in 2014 and was completed successfully on 7 January 2015. (The increase in 2013 and 2014 figures was due to this intervening transfer of aircraft and routes from Lufthansa.)

== Destinations ==
Germanwings served more than 130 destinations across Europe.

=== Codeshare agreements ===
Germanwings had codeshare agreements with the following airlines:

- Air Canada
- All Nippon Airways
- Austrian Airlines
- Brussels Airlines
- Lufthansa
- Swiss International Air Lines
- United Airlines

== Fleet ==
Germanwings operated the following aircraft:

Aircraft	Total	Introduced	Retired	Notes
Airbus A319-100	50	2002	2020	Operated for Eurowings between 2015 and 2020
Airbus A320-200	26	2003	2019	
Boeing 717-200	2	2004	2005	Leased from Aerolíneas de Baleares
McDonnell Douglas MD-81	1	2007	2007	Leased from Nordic Airways
McDonnell Douglas MD-82	1	2007	2007	Leased from FlyNordic
McDonnell Douglas MD-83	1	2007	2007	Leased from Nordic Airways

=== Special liveries ===
Germanwings used several different special liveries. Some aircraft had special liveries promoting German cities (e.g. the Bearbus paint scheme inspired by the coat of arms of Berlin), or as advertisements (e.g. a pink livery for T-Mobile). Those were abandoned during the 2013 rebranding.

== Incidents and accidents ==
D-AIPX, the aircraft that crashed in the French Alps as Flight 9525

- On 24 March 2015, Germanwings Flight 9525, an Airbus A320-211 with registration D-AIPX flying from Barcelona to Düsseldorf, crashed in the south of France near Digne-les-Bains; 150 people were killed, with no survivors. German investigators concluded that 27-year-old co-pilot Andreas Lubitz had deliberately crashed the plane, while alone in the cockpit.

== See also ==
- List of defunct airlines of Germany
