= Germania (airline) =

Privately owned airline of Germany (1978–2019)

- Airbus A319
IATA	ICAO	Call sign
ST	GMI	GERMANIA
- Commenced operations: 1 June 1986
- Ceased operations: 5 February 2019
- Operating bases: Berlin–Schönefeld; Berlin–Tegel; Bremen; Dresden; Düsseldorf; Erfurt–Weimar; Friedrichshafen; Hamburg; Munich; Münster/Osnabrück; Nuremberg; Palma de Mallorca; Pristina; Rostock
- Subsidiaries: Bulgarian Eagle (2017–2019); Germania Flug (2014–2019); HolidayJet (Mar 2015–Nov 2015)
- Headquarters: Berlin, Germany
- Key people: Karsten Balke (CEO)

Germania Fluggesellschaft mbH, trading as Germania (German pronunciation: ['gɛrmani:a]), was a privately owned German airline with its headquarters in Berlin. It began with charter operations, then moved towards becoming a scheduled carrier, although some charter flights were still operated. The change in strategy led to growth over its last few years, and Germania flew to destinations in Europe, North Africa and the Middle East from several German airports. It carried 2.5 million passengers in 2009 and had around 850 employees as of summer 2014. It declared bankruptcy on 4 February 2019 and it ceased operations in the following day.

== History ==
Germania logo used until 2009

=== Early years 1978-1999 ===
The origins of the airline date back to April 1978 when it was established as SAT Flug GmbH-Special Air Transport (SAT) in Cologne and started operations on 5 September of that same year with a Fokker F-27. In November 1978, a Sud Aviation Caravelle was purchased second-hand, which was replaced by two used Boeing 727-100, second-hand as well.

In spring 1986, the company was re-organised and its name was changed to Germania, the traditional Latin name of Germany, on 1 June 1986, inheriting all SAT activities. For many years, Germania's main area of doing business were charter services for TUI, Condor and Neckermann Reisen – an area in which Germania earned a reputation for offering the lowest prices. In April 1991 the activities of Berlin European UK were absorbed. In 1992 the registered office was relocated to Tegel. In the same year Germania won the bid for flight services between the old and new capital of Germany (Bonn and Berlin) on behalf of the German government, establishing a short-lived Beamten-Shuttle (German for “shuttle for civil servants”).

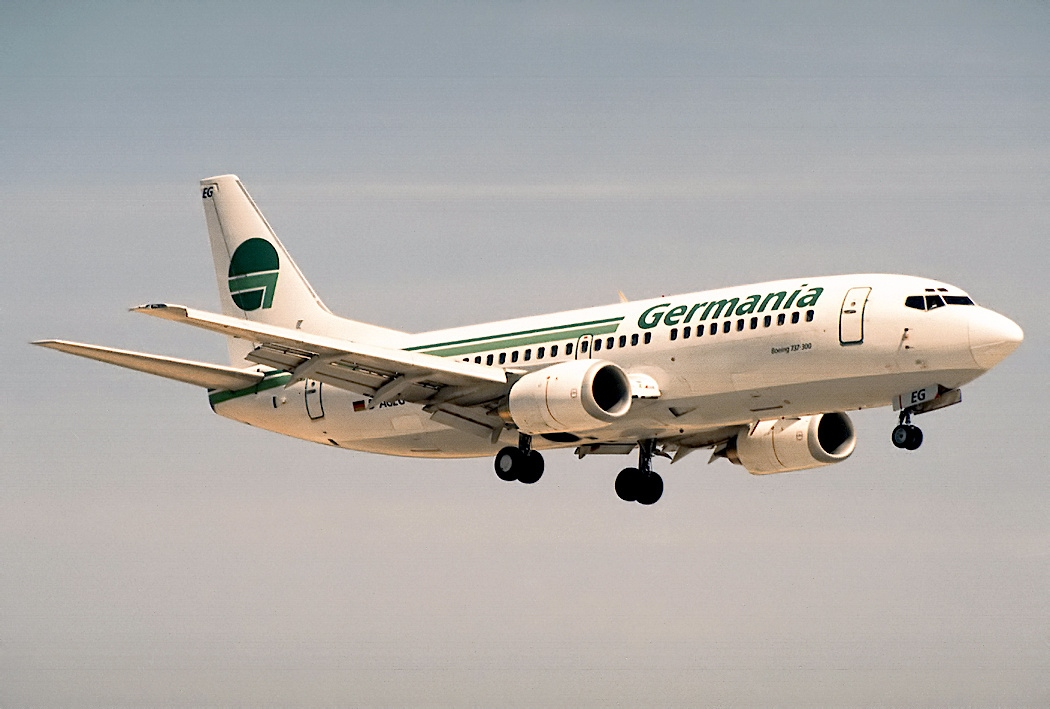
GBoeing 737-300 in 1996

In 1998, the airline pioneered the use of aircraft for advertising in Germany (advertisers included Siemens and various tour operators). In the same year, Germania began to lease more and more planes to other airlines such as Hapag-Lloyd Express, Maersk and Delta.

=== Scheduled services ===
On 12 November 2001, Germania launched scheduled services between Berlin Tegel and Frankfurt. Germania initially offered a one-way ticket at EUR 99.00. Incumbent operator Lufthansa reacted immediately by lowering its prices and effectively matching the low Germania fares. Previously, Lufthansa sold tickets between these two cities for EUR 485.00 return. Lufthansa was sued for its anticompetitive practice and was forced to raise its fare to at least EUR 30.50 one-way over the Germania fare.

By early summer 2002, it became public that Germania obviously would lose its major leisure charter contract with German tour operator TUI from late 2002. The contract accounted for 75 percent of Germania's flight volume. The loss of the TUI charter contract combined with other business development led to skepticism regarding the financial health of the company. At that time, Germania and S.A.T. had a fleet of 27 aircraft of which only eight were deployed on the carriers charter and scheduled services. All remaining aircraft were leased to others.

Later, Germania was again partnered by TUI for creation of its new low-cost division Hapag-Lloyd Express. While TUI took a 100%-stake in the start-up, Germania was contracted to wet-lease eight of its Boeing 737-700 aircraft. Hapag-Lloyd Express commenced operations with the first four Boeing 737 on 3 December. Germania flights between Berlin and Cologne/Bonn were moved to Hapag-Lloyd Express as part of the deal.

However, Germania retained own scheduled operations between from Berlin Tegel to Frankfurt and Munich. In November 2002, flights to Palma da Mallorca was added. Reportedly in late 2002 or very early 2003, Germania acquired a fleet of 17 Fokker 100 from bankrupt US Airways at an extremely low price.

=== Budget airline operations as "gexx" ===
Germania decided to use its acquired Fokker 100 fleet to build a low-budget airline named Germania Express or gexx. Set-up as a virtual carrier with flights operated by its mother Germania, gexx commenced short-haul operations out of Berlin Tegel on June 1, 2003. Unlike most other airlines, gexx used a fixed-fare scheme - depending the route tickets were sold at a single price with no differentiation concerning time of booking. Germania gradually refurbished further Fokker 100, allowing a continued growth of its gexx division. Within the first year of operations, gexx handled 1,42 million passengers while maintaining an average load factor of 72 percent and an average ticket fare of EUR 82, allowing a profitable operation. At the same time, it operated 15 Fokker 100 to 26 destinations around Europe.

Following a purchase of a 64% stake in dba (later part of Air Berlin) on 28 March 2005, Germania wet-leased 12 Fokker 100 aircraft to dba. At the same time, dba took over Germania Express's 15 established low-cost routes and thus absorbed Germania's gexx brand. Germania on the other hand, with all aircraft having been leased to other airlines, no longer offered routes directly to passengers.

Germania relaunched scheduled flights under its own brand name out of Berlin and Düsseldorf, beginning with the 2008 summer schedule.

The foundations were laid for the first maintenance hangar at Berlin Brandenburg Airport on 21 March 2011. Germania planned to use the hangar together once the airport becomes operational.

On 3 March 2014, Germania had its traffic rights for flights to Iraq revoked after an intervention by Iraqi Airways. On 12 March 2014, Germania was allowed to resume all operations to Iraq with the first flight resuming on the 17 March 2014.

=== Further expansion plans ===
Germania opened two seasonal UK bases in summer 2013, Manchester and London-Gatwick after securing charter contracts from several holiday companies. London-Gatwick remained as a permanent base after opening two scheduled routes to Pristina and Erfurt. London-Gatwick also served an inbound destination for sister company, Gambia Bird airlines. In summer 2014, Norwich International was added as Germania's third UK (seasonal) base.

In spring 2015, Germania announced plans to phase out all of their recently refurbished Boeing 737-700s by 2020 to become an all-Airbus operator. The airline therefore ordered 25 new Airbus A320neos for delivery from 2020.

In September 2016, Germania announced it would cease all operations at Kassel Airport where it was the only scheduled carrier at the time. In August 2017, the airline obtained an air operator's certificate (AOC) for its Bulgarian subsidiary, Bulgarian Eagle, and it has registered an Airbus A319 in Bulgaria. The aircraft was going to be, according to the airline, wet-leased to partner companies.

=== Bankruptcy and liquidation ===
In December 2018, it was reported that the airline had suffered heavy losses in recent years, especially during 2018 and that its owners were seeking potential buyers for the airline. On 31 January 2019, it was reported that payment of employee salaries would be delayed. Germania eventually ceased flight operations without previous notice in the night from 4 to 5 February 2019 and declared bankruptcy for itself and its technical and service divisions (excluding Germania Flug in Switzerland). The final scheduled Germania flight to be in the air was ST 3711 from Fuerteventura to Nuremberg which landed on 5 February at 01:11 CET in the morning.

== Corporate affairs ==
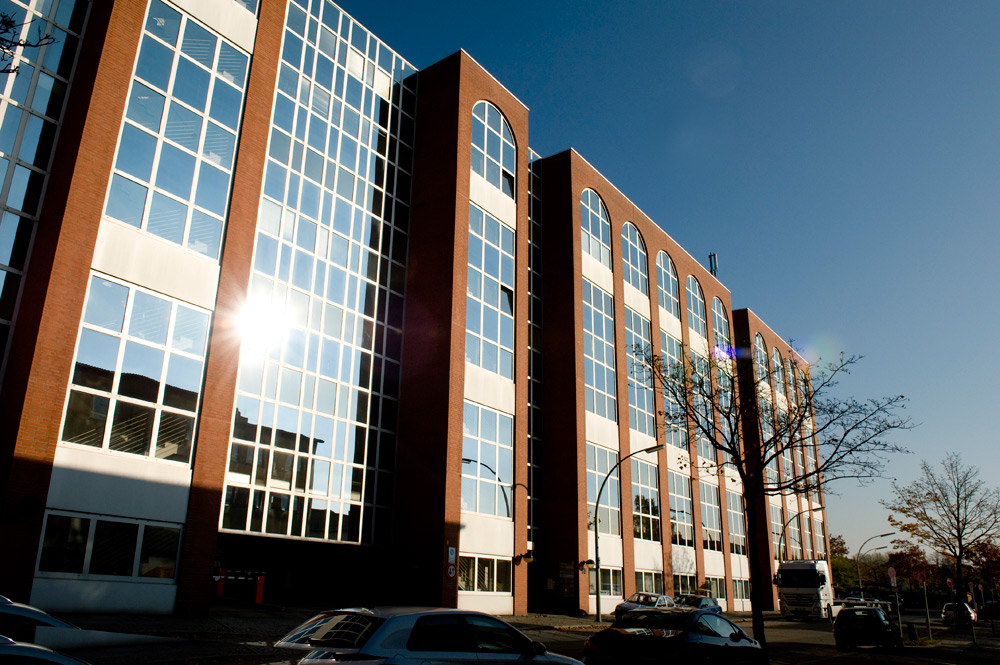
Head office in Berlin

=== Ownership and structure ===
Germania Fluggesellschaft mbH was a private company that had been founded and run for many years by Hinrich Bischoff, who died on 11 November 2005. His wife Ingrid Bischoff was the main shareholder, but she sold it. Germania had its headquarters at Riedemannweg 58, Berlin, Germany.

There were three main operating subsidiaries:

- Germania Flug, founded in August 2014 in Switzerland to operate leisure flights under the newly established HolidayJet brand in cooperation with Swiss tour operator Hotelplan (three aircraft).
- Bulgarian Eagle, founded in 2016 in Bulgaria as an ACMI carrier, with aircraft based at London Gatwick (two aircraft).
- Germania Technik Brandenburg GmbH, the wholly owned aircraft maintenance subsidiary, based at Berlin Schönefeld.

Germania also had an interest in:

- Gambia Bird, an airline based at Banjul, The Gambia, which ceased operations after two years, on 30 December 2014

=== Business trends ===
As Germania was a private company, annual reports did not have to be published. Very few figures were released into the public domain. In the absence of these, the little information for the Germania group that appears to be available was:

	2007	2008	2009	2010	2011	2012	2013	2014	2015	2016	2017	2018
Turnover (€m)	144.80	179.96	171.41	177.78	206.88	203.79	271.05	396.47	424.25	369.10	453.67	
Profit (€m)	6.769	6.157	6.896	0.283	0.361	0.505	−10.852	−26.848	−6.796	−7.742	6.084	
Number of employees	709	714	644	622	553	513	605	880	901	954	1.108	
Number of passengers (m)			2.5	2.3	2.4					2.6	3.0	
Number of scheduled seats (only) (m) *						0.22	0.75	1.31	2.83	3.19	3.95	4.57
Number of aircraft (group)(at year end)	27	16	15	17	13	15	19	23	22	22	29	35
Notes/sources												

*In the absence of meaningful published data, the number of scheduled seats operated is shown as a proxy for the trends of the business.

== Destinations ==
Germania offered a wide range of some year-round and mainly seasonal leisure and some metropolitan routes from several German airports. From its bases, scheduled flights to Armenia, Turkey, Kosovo, Israel and Lebanon were also offered, servicing minorities living in Germany and Austria.

=== Codeshare agreements ===
- Sky Express

== Fleet ==
=== Final fleet ===
At the time of shutdown, the fleet (excluding the Swiss and Bulgarian subsidiaries Germania Flug and Bulgarian Eagle) consisted of the following aircraft:

Aircraft type	In service	Orders	Passengers	Remarks
Airbus A319-100	19	—	144	
Airbus A319-100	19	—	150	
Airbus A320neo	—	25	180	Were to be delivered from 2020.
Airbus A321-200	6	—	215	
Boeing 737-700	5	—	148	One in 30th anniversary special livery. Were to be retired by 2019.
Total	30	25		

=== Historical fleet ===
Over the years, Germania operated the following aircraft types:

Aircraft type	Introduced	Retired
Boeing 737-300	1987	2011
Fokker 100	2003	2008
Boeing 727-100	1984	1987
Fokker F27 Friendship	1978	1981
Sud Aviation Caravelle	1978	1986

== Gallery ==
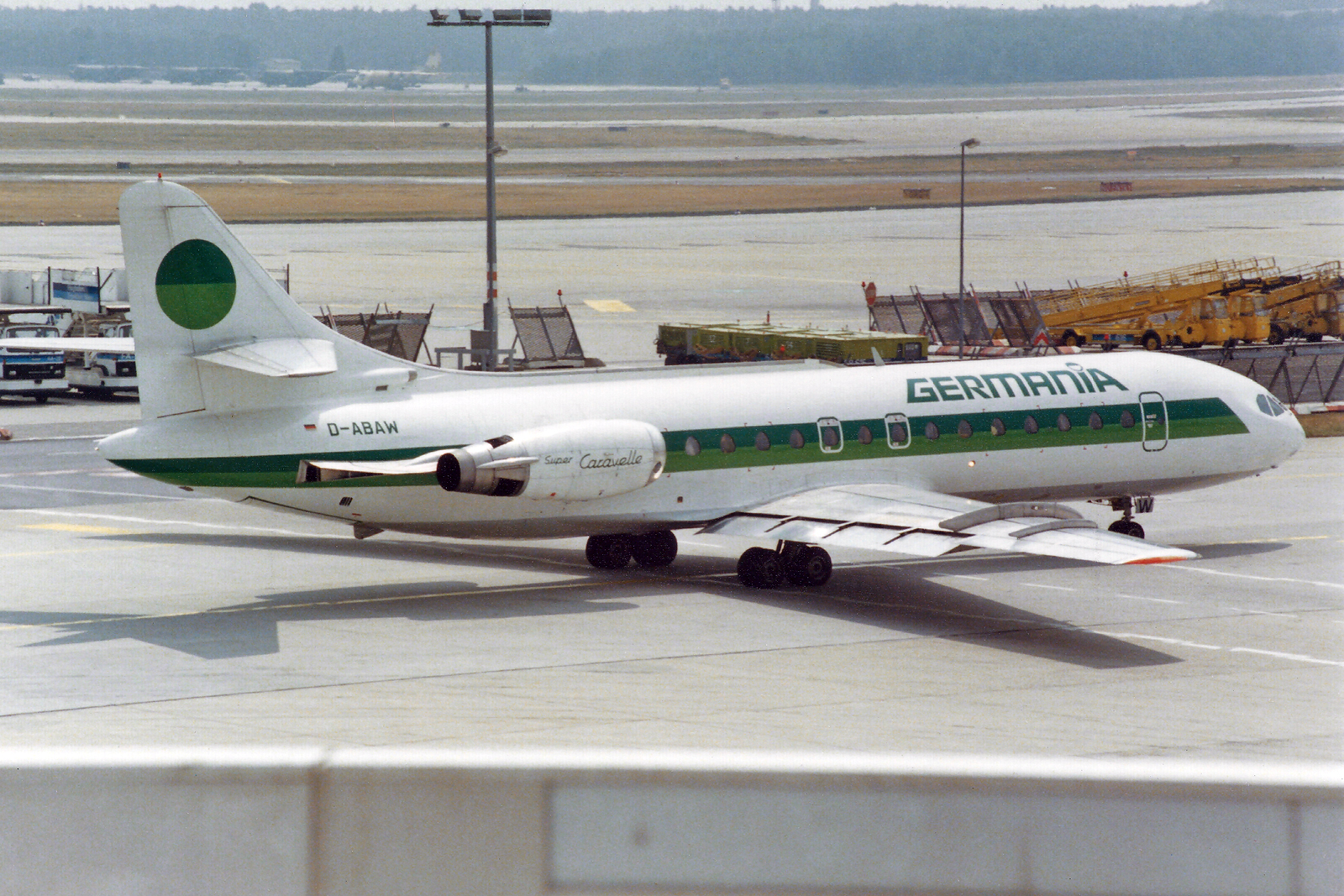
Sud SE-210 Caravelle serie 10B1R

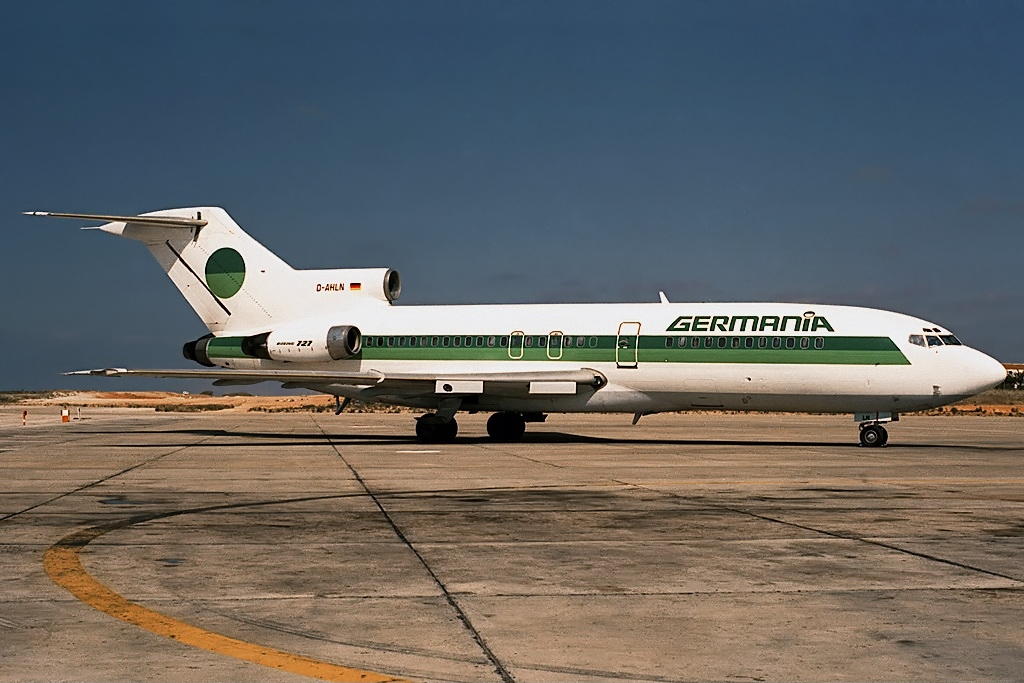
Boeing 727

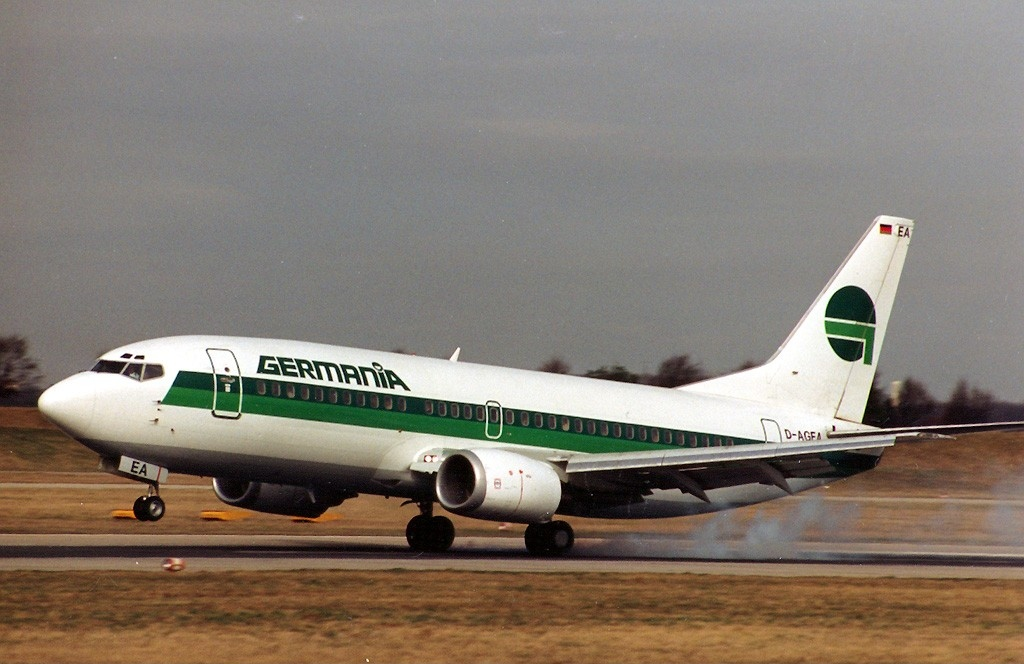
Boeing 737-35B

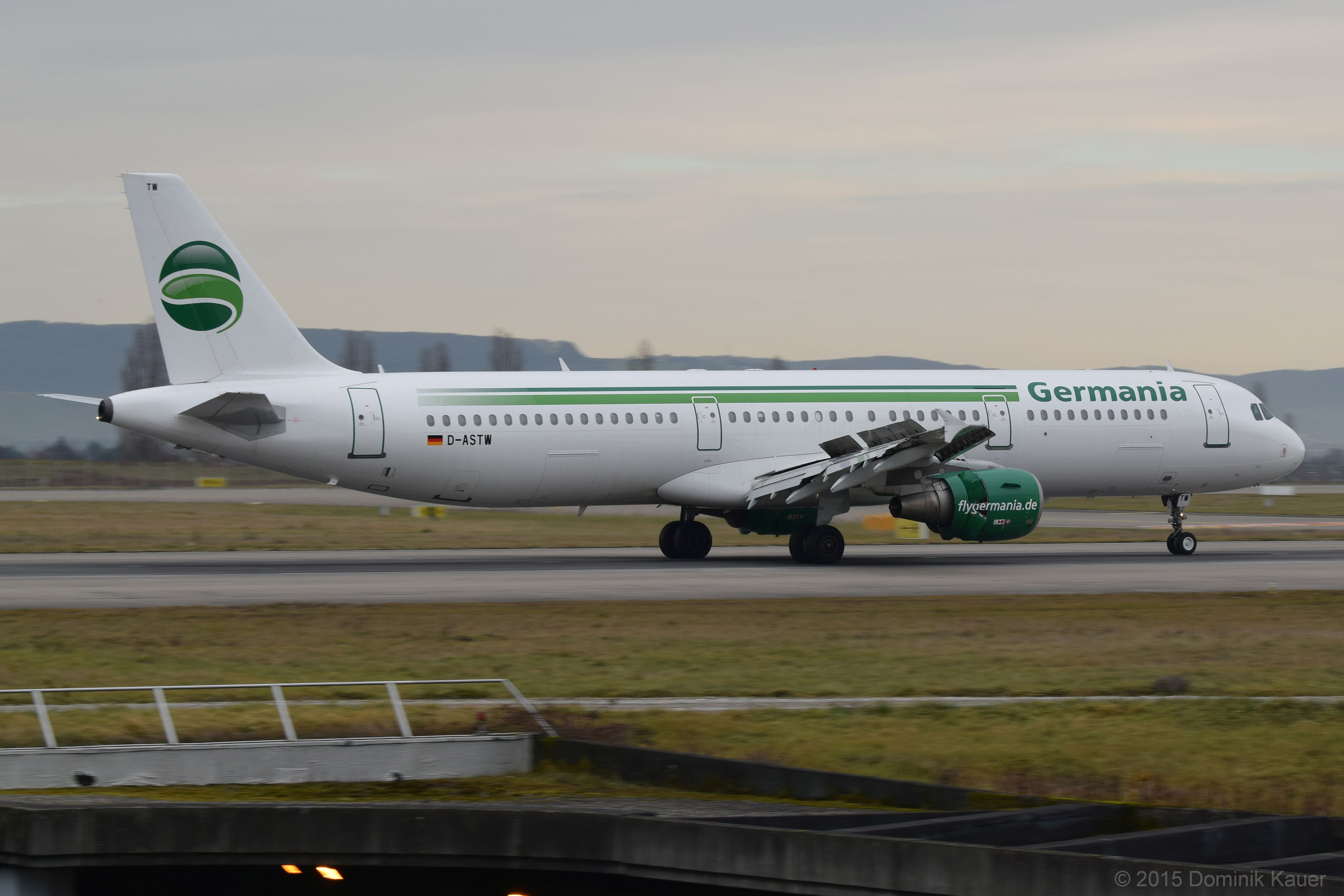
Airbus A321-211

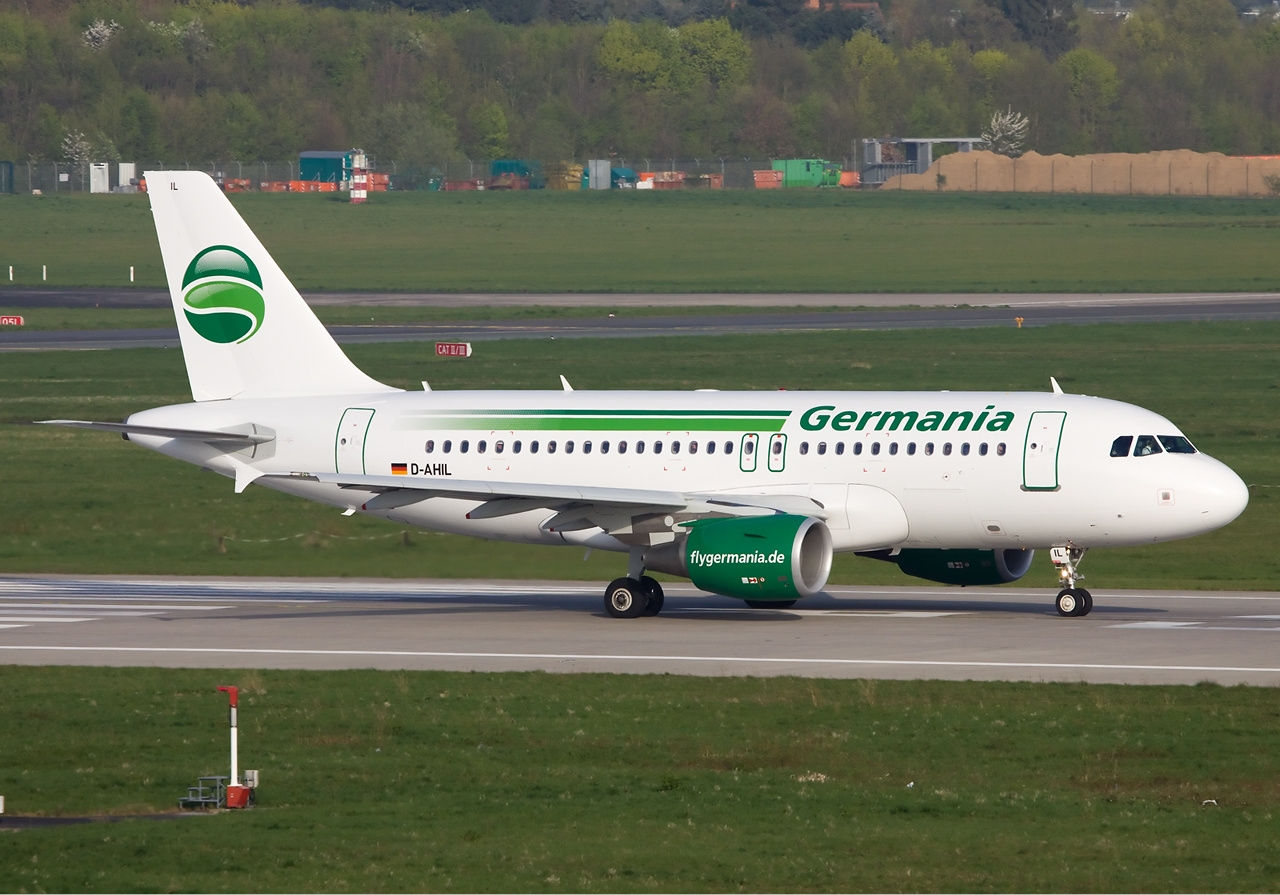
Airbus A319

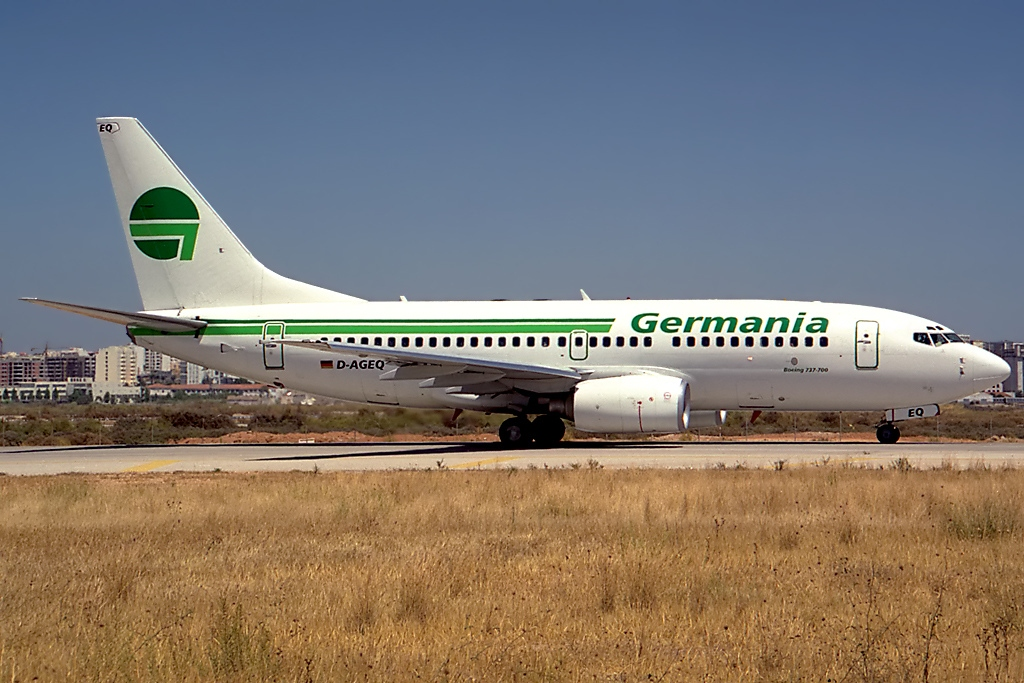
Boeing 737-75B

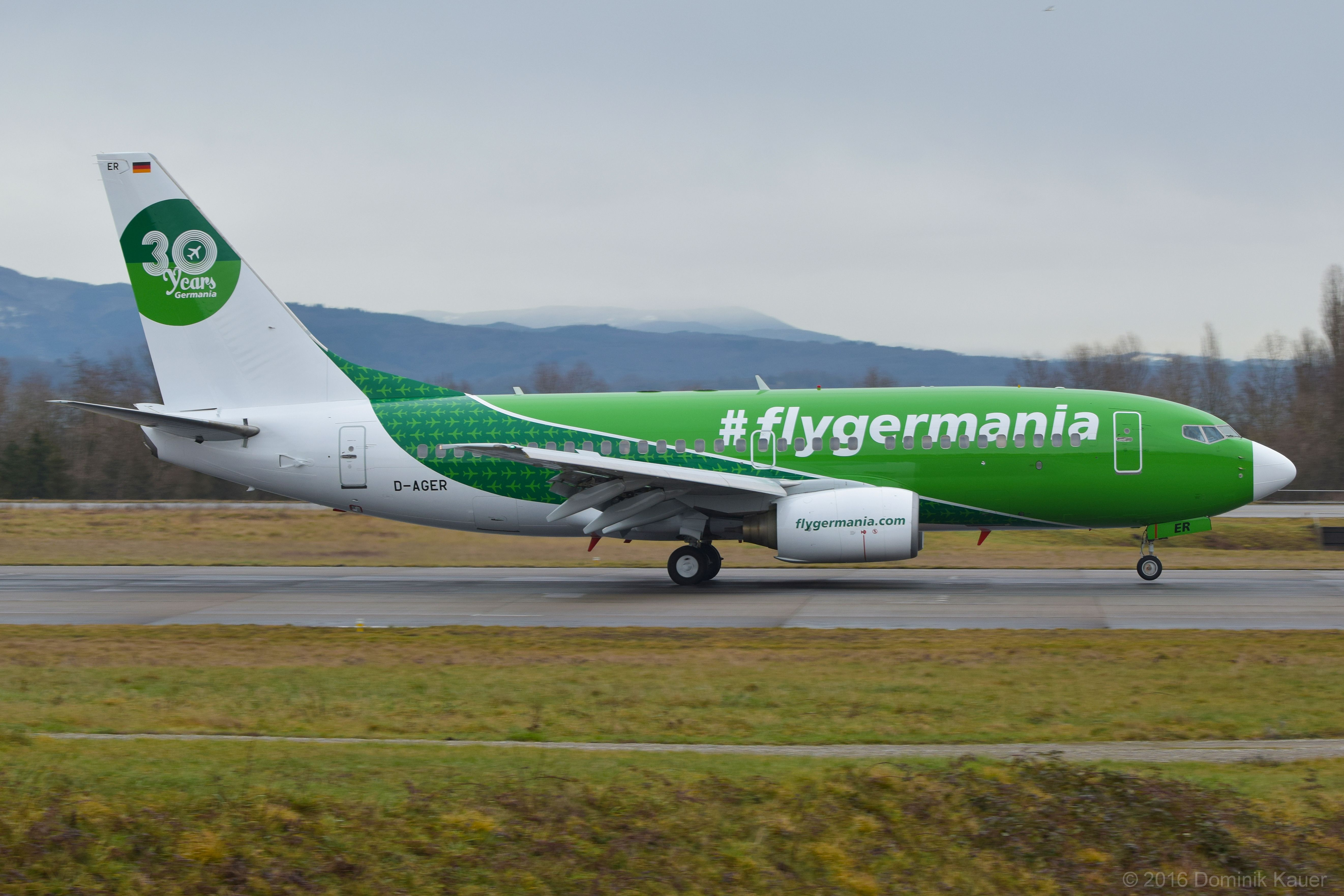
Boeing 737-75B in special "30 Years" colors

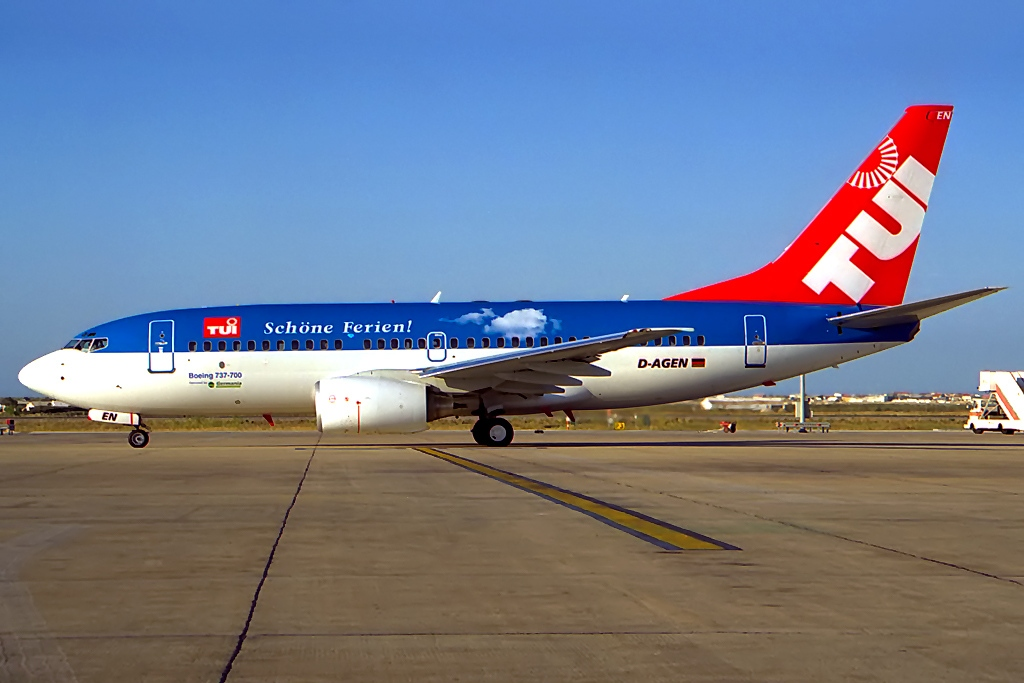
Boeing 737-75B operated for TUI

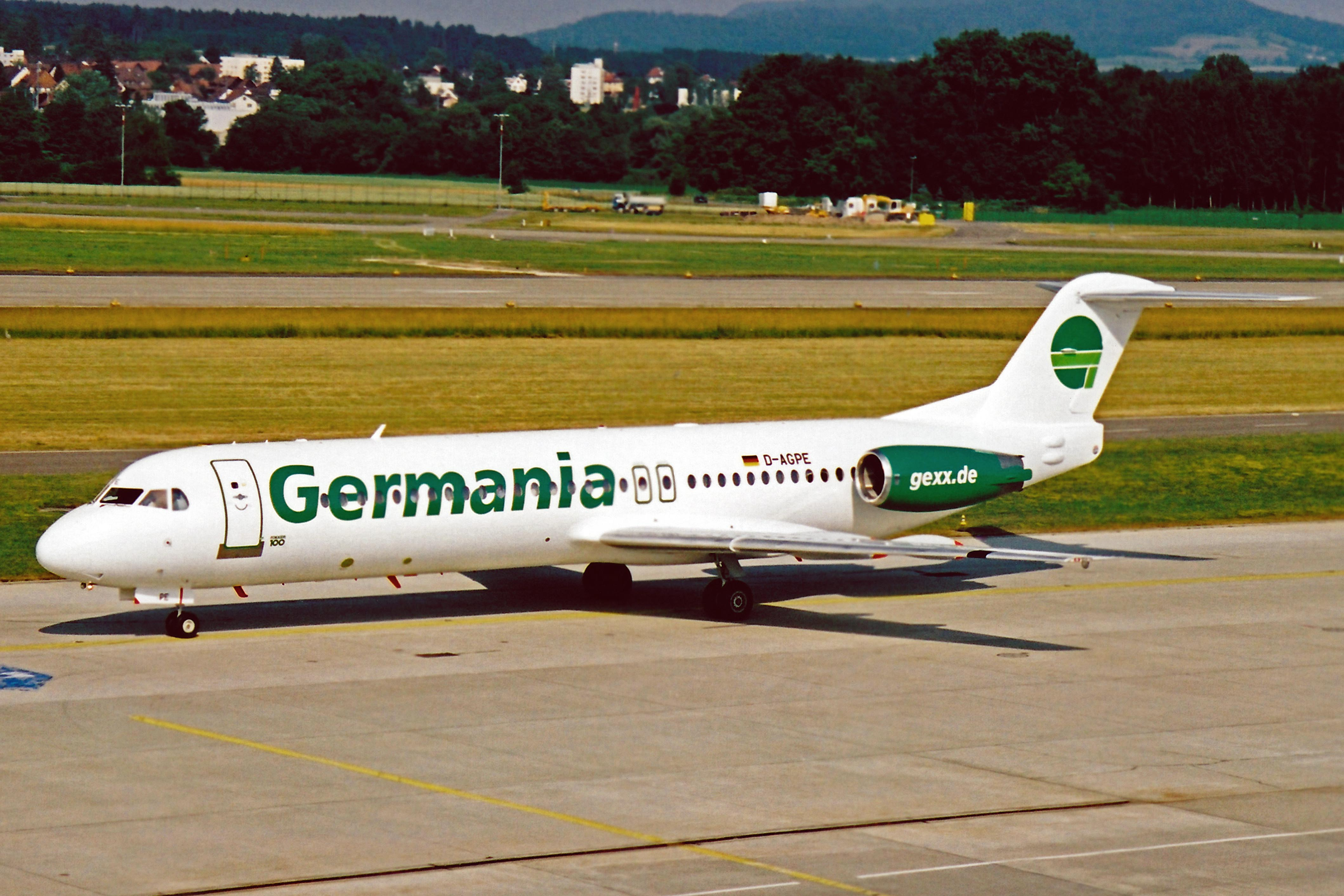
Fokker 100
