= Bulgarian Eagle =

Airline of Bulgaria (2017–2019)

IATA	ICAO	Call sign
—	BEG	BULGARIAN EAGLE
- Founded: 31 July 2017
- Commenced operations: 4 August 2017
- Ceased operations: 5 February 2019
- Operating bases: Sofia Airport
- Fleet size: 2
- Parent company: Germania

Bulgarian Eagle was an aircraft-crew-maintenance-insurance (ACMI) carrier founded in 2017. It was a subsidiary of Germania and was founded to increase Germania's presence in the wet-lease market.

== History ==
Bulgarian Eagle received its Air Operator's Certificate on July 31, 2017 and started operations in the following month. Until February 2019, the air carrier operated flights for Germania Group with two Airbus A319 aircraft in full Germania livery with the inscription "Operated by Bulgarian Eagle" on the fuselage. The airline planned to operate scheduled flights in the future. Following the insolvency of Germania in February 2019, Bulgarian Eagle ceased all operations.

== Fleet ==
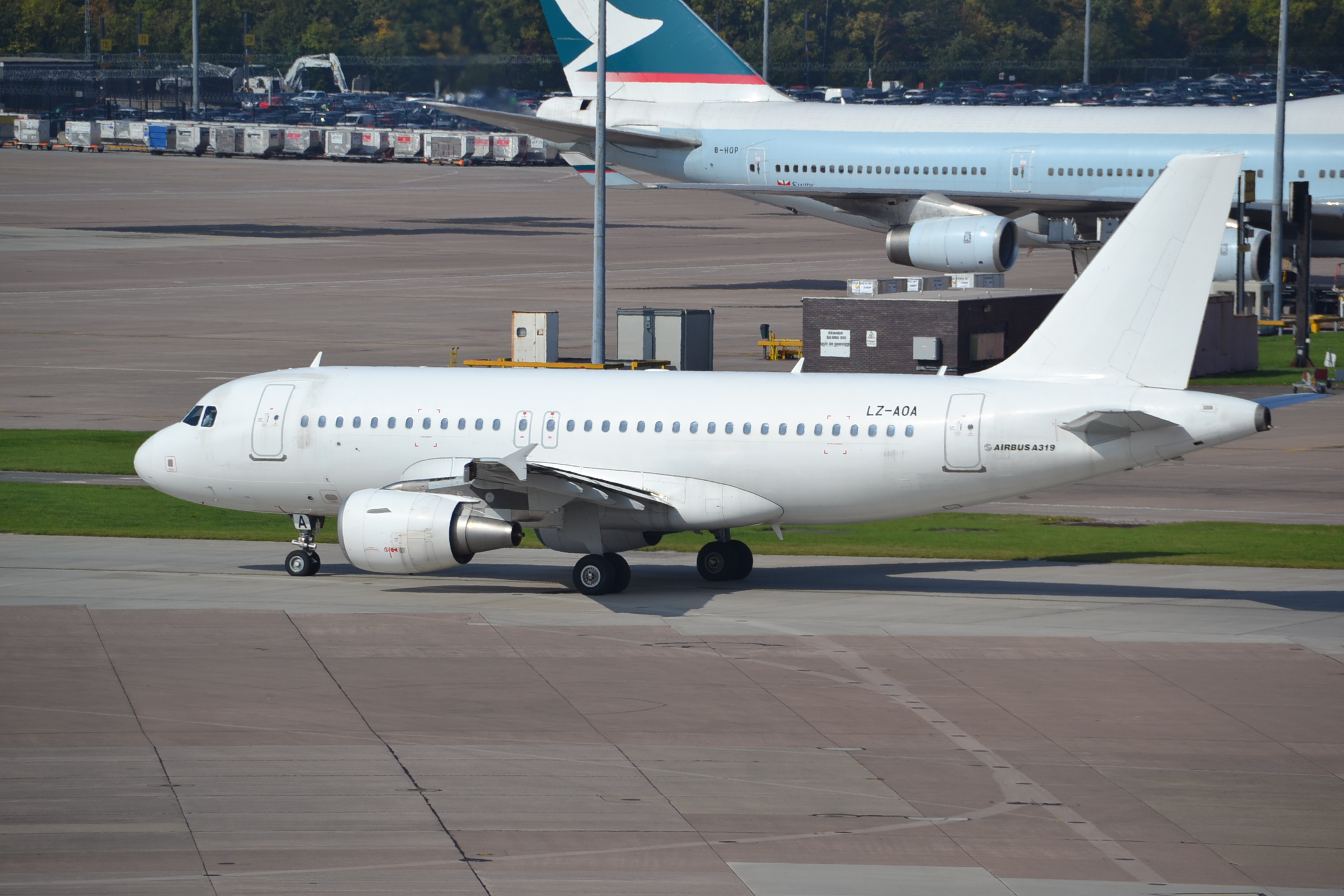
Airbus A319

As of September 2018, Bulgarian Eagle operated the following aircraft:

2 Airbus A319:

- LZ-AOA operating for Germania
- LZ-AOC operating for Germania Flug
