= Hapag-Lloyd Express =

Budget airline of Germany (2002–2007)

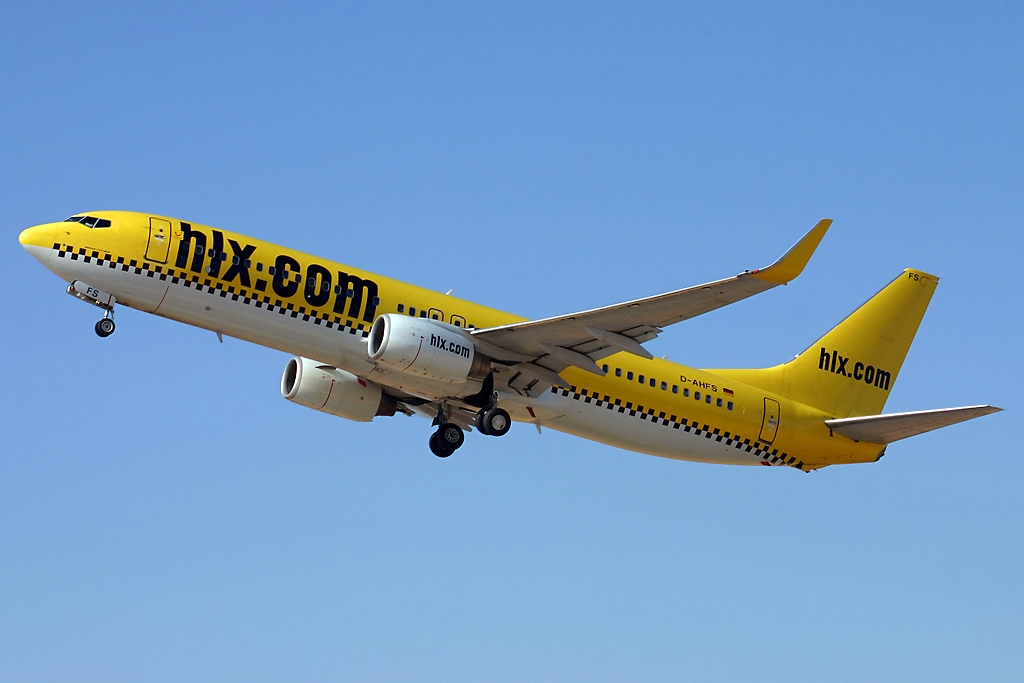
- Boeing 737-800
IATA	ICAO	Call sign
X3	HLX	YELLOW CAB
- Founded: 2002
- Commenced operations: 3 December 2002
- Ceased operations: 15 January 2007 merged into TUI fly Deutschland)
- Operating bases: Cologne/Bonn; Hannover; Leipzig/Halle; Stuttgart
- Fleet size: 16
- Destinations: See TUIfly
- Parent company: TUI Group
- Headquarters: Langenhagen, Lower Saxony, Germany
- Key people: Roland Keppler
- Website: HLX.com

Hapag-Lloyd Express GmbH, also known as HLX.com, was a no-frills, high-frequency, express airline based in Langenhagen, Germany. It played a significant role in the European aviation panorama during its operational years from 2002 to 2007. On 15 January 2007, it combined its operations with those of Hapag-Lloyd Flug into TUIfly. While Hapag-Lloyd Flug operated all TUIfly flights, Hapag-Lloyd Express marketed them until 1 July 2010.

== History ==
Old logo

Hapag-Lloyd Express GmbH was established in 2002 and began operations in early December, two months after Germanwings, its direct German competitor at Cologne Bonn airport. Despite starting its service later and serving fewer routes, HLX gained a higher recognition and a better reputation through its category-defining campaign "Fly for the price of a taxi", as well as higher load factors. A digital-first strategy resulted in more absolute website traffic and a higher share of online sales than any other airline in Germany within the first year of operation. The airline subsequently won the "Effie" efficiency awards in Germany and Europe recognizing its more effective branding, marketing, and sales strategy.

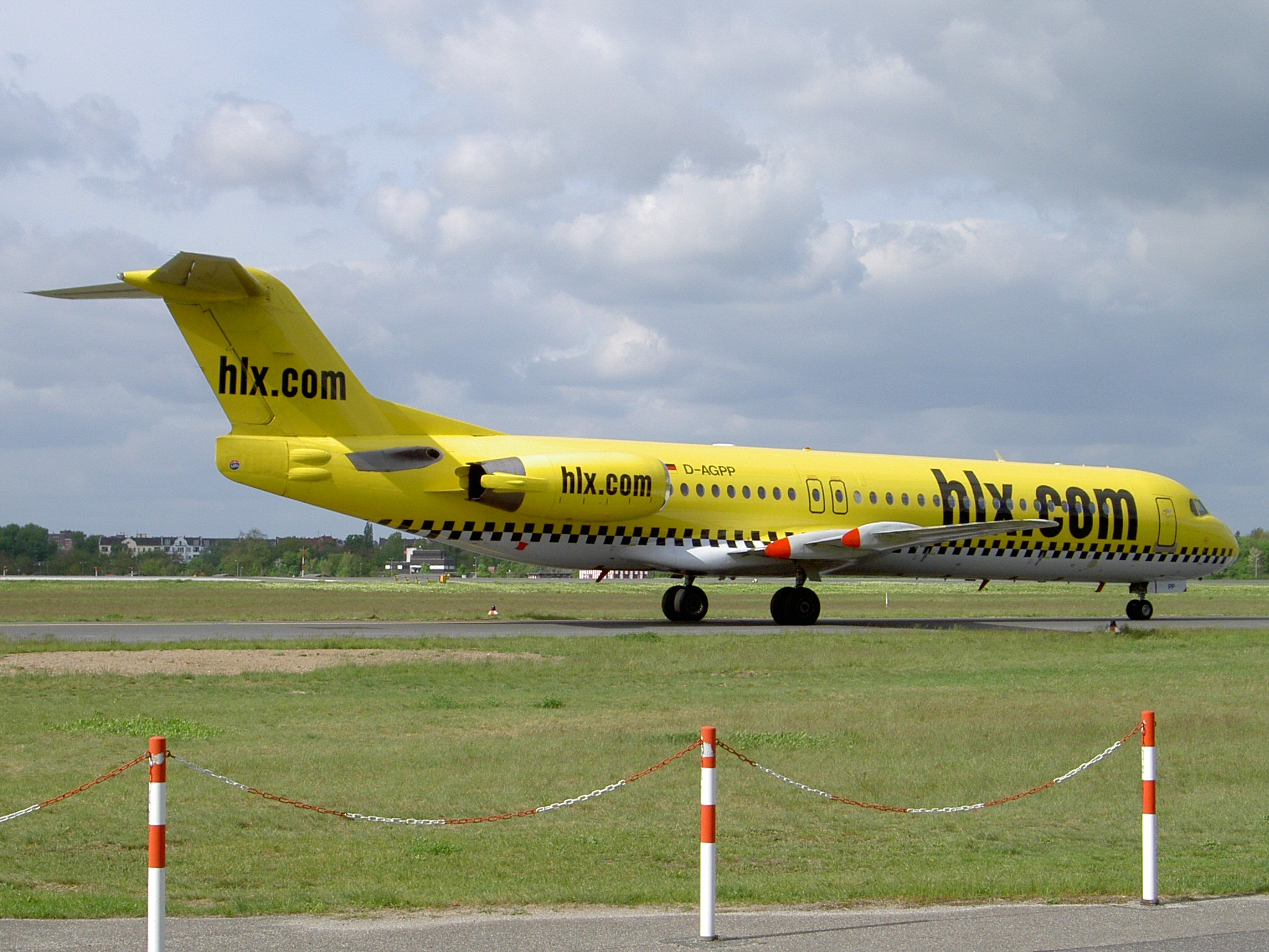
Fokker 100

Its main competitors were more established no-frills carriers such as Ryanair and EasyJet, as well as other low-cost startups such as Germanwings or Transavia.com, consequently being constantly engaged in a price war with these carriers. In an attempt to win it, the airline expanded rapidly in the first half of 2004, announcing many new routes that it viewed as underserved by other airlines. Examples of such routes included Dublin to Hamburg and Stuttgart, both of which were later cancelled.

Hapag-Lloyd Express (HLX) accelerated the adoption of low-cost air travel in Germany by combining bold branding and marketing with an early hybrid LCC model, demonstrating both the demand potential and the structural limits of subscale, tour-operator-backed entrants in a consolidating European market. In January 2007, Hapag-Lloyd Express and Hapag-Lloyd Flug were merged into TUIfly as an attempt to reorganize TUI's airline portfolio. HLX continued operations until its complete absorption on July 1, 2010.

== Services ==
Hapag-Lloyd Express offered no-frills services to destinations in Germany and Europe. Most of them are now operated by TUIfly.

== Fleet ==
Most of Hapag-Lloyd Express' aircraft were wet-leased from Hapag-Lloyd Flug.

Aircraft type	Total	Introduced	Retired	Remarks
Boeing 737-400	1	2003	2003	
Boeing 737-500	5	2004	2007	
Boeing 737-700	8	2002	2007	5 operated by Germania
Boeing 737-800	3	2006	2007	
Fokker 100	2	2005	2006	Operated by Germania

=== Livery ===
Hapag-Lloyd Express aircraft were highly recognizable due to their distinctive "New York taxi" style: a checkered black and white line wrapped around a yellow body, aiming to convey the image of quick and cheap point-to-point service.

== See also ==
- List of defunct airlines of Germany
