= Kassel Airport =

Airport serving Kassel, Germany

Kassel Airport Flughafen Kassel

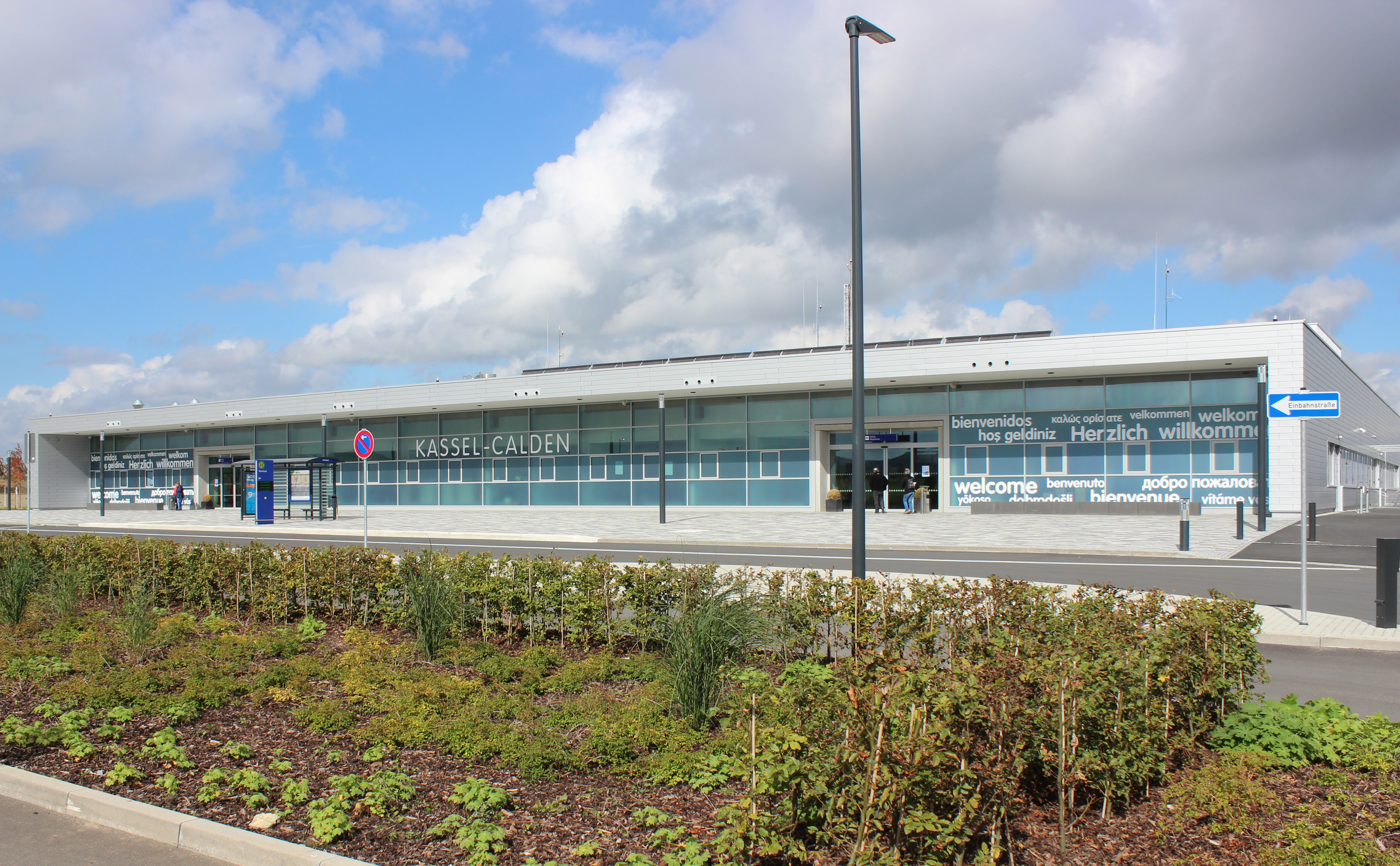
- IATA: KSF; ICAO: EDVK

Summary
- Airport type: Public
- Operator: Flughafen Kassel GmbH
- Serves: Kassel, Germany
- Elevation AMSL: 820 ft (250 m)
- Coordinates: 51°25′15″N 009°23′32″E
- Website: kassel-airport.de
- Interactive map of Kassel Airport

Runways
Direction	Length		Surface
Direction	m	ft	Surface
04/22	1,500	4,921	Asphalt
04L/22R	700	2,297	Grass
09/27	2,500	8,200	Asphalt

Statistics (2022)
- Passengers: 115,597 ▲+207,1%
- Aircraft movements: 29,814 ▲+32,3%
- Cargo (metric tons): 5 ▼-53,1%
- Sources: Statistics at ADV., AIP at German air traffic control.

Kassel Airport (formerly Kassel-Calden Airport, German Flughafen Kassel) (IATA: KSF, ICAO: EDVK) is a minor international airport serving the German city of Kassel in the state of Hesse. It is located 1.9 km (1.2 mi) west of Calden, 16.7 km (10.4 mi) northwest of Kassel and is mainly used for business and general aviation. There is also a flight school, an ultralight flying school, and a parachuting school based on site.

== History ==
=== Foundation ===
Built on farmland, 908 ft (277 m) ASL lying NNE of the Hoher Dörnberg, the airport was opened on 11 July 1970. It has been operated as a public–private partnership since 1991.

=== Redevelopment into a regional airport ===
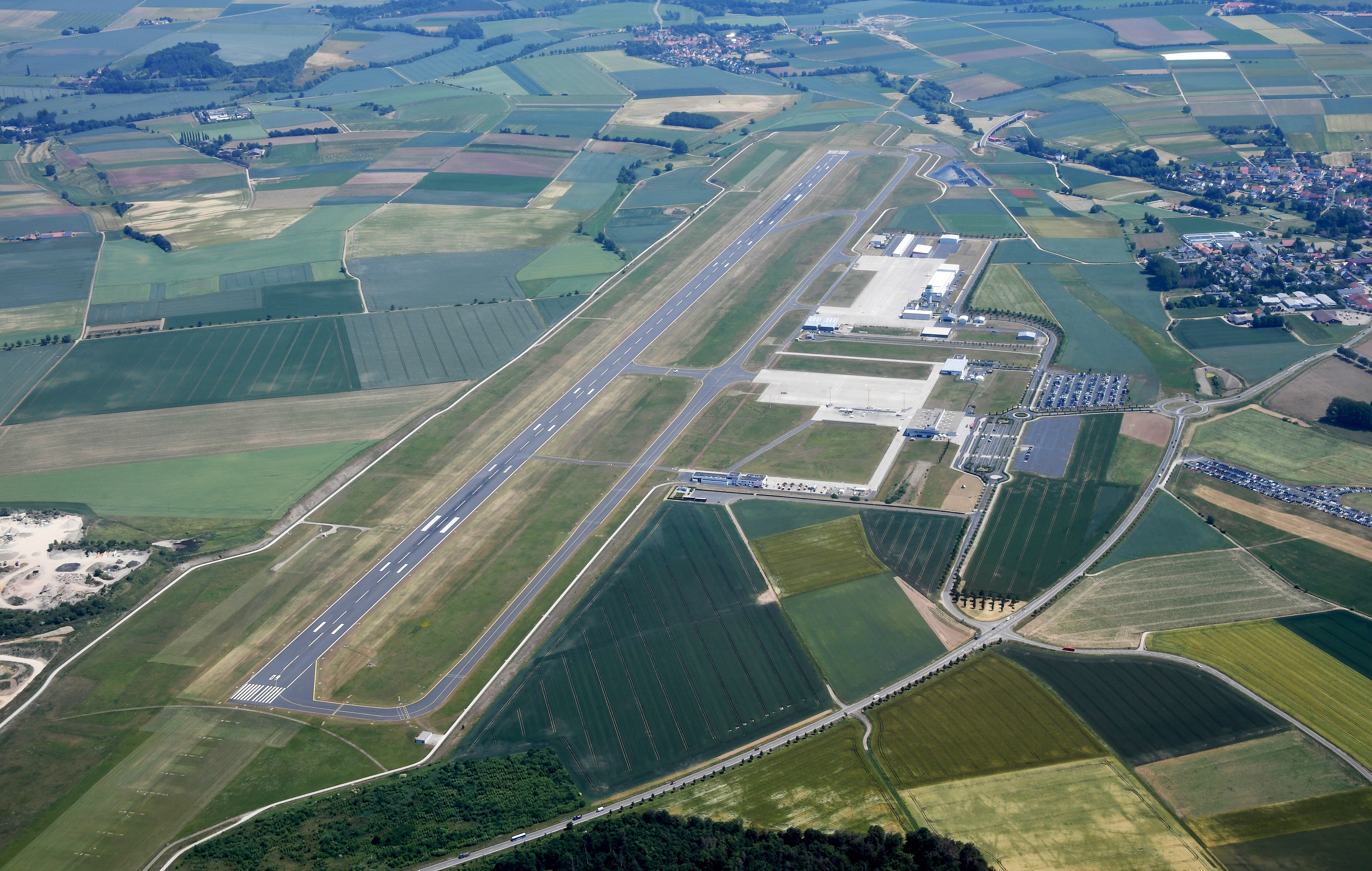
Aerial view of Kassel Airport

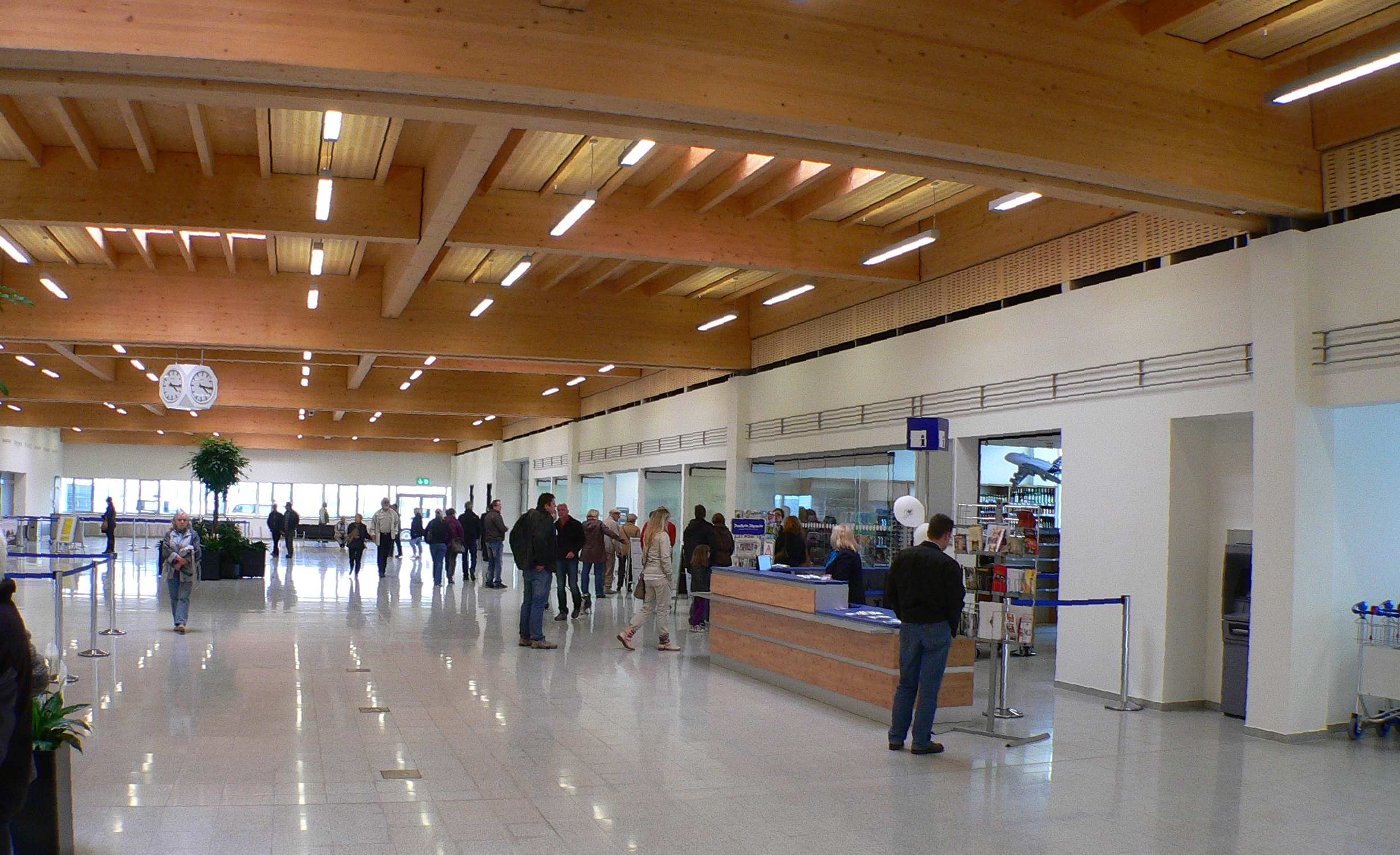
Main hall

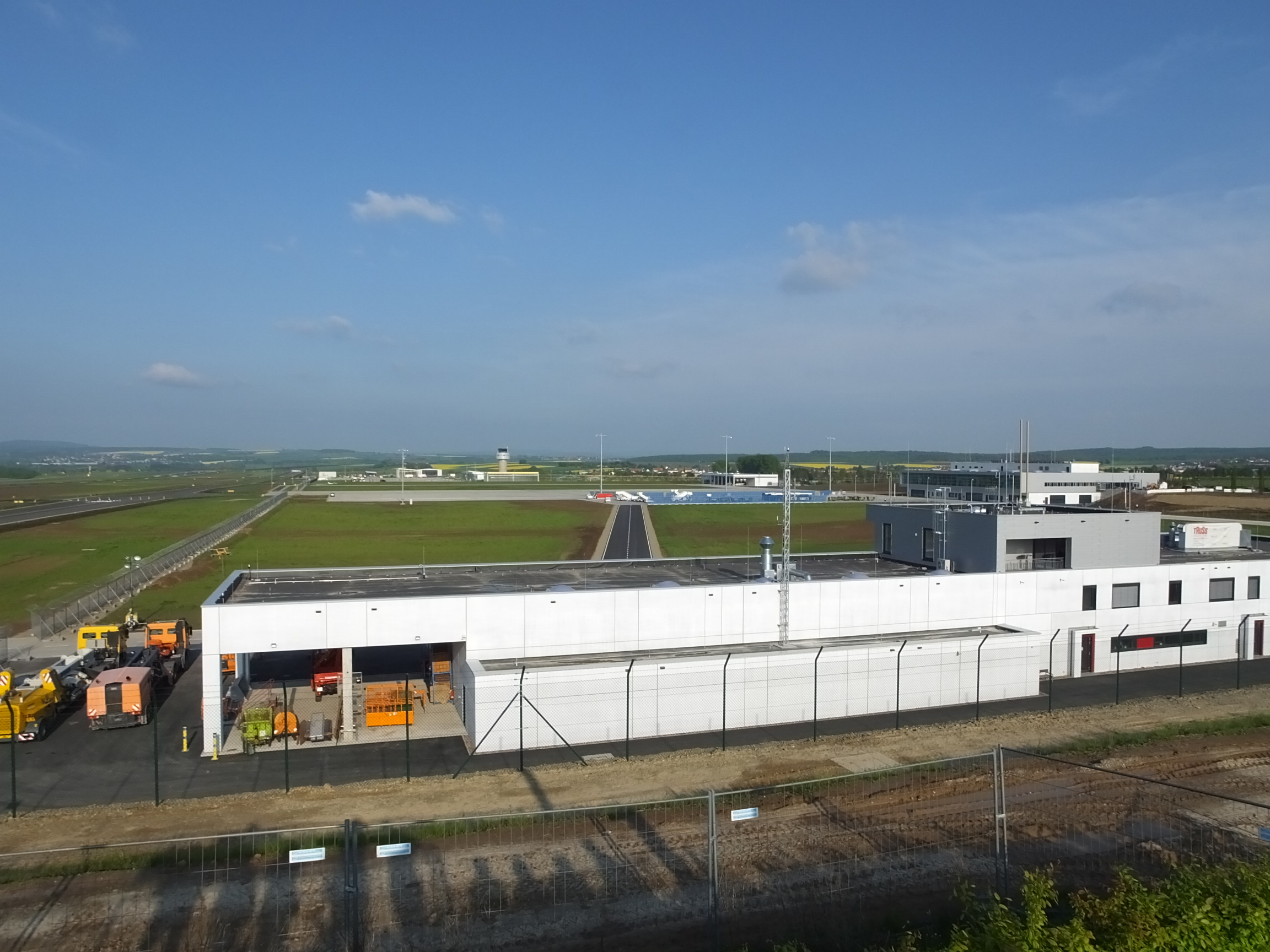
Apron overview

A completely new regional airport has been built next to the old airport to accommodate commercial chartered and scheduled carriers as well as the business and general aviation from the old airport. The new airport has officially opened on 4 April 2013 with the arrival of a Germania flight from Frankfurt Airport.

The new airport faced several struggles when opened. The most important customer at first was the travel agency branch of REWE Group, with charter flights to the Mediterranean region. Originally, these were planned to be operated by XL Airways Germany. Following the bankruptcy of that airline, Enter Air was contracted instead, but also pulled out on 20 March 2013. The flights to Tenerife operated by Germania were scheduled to end in October 2013 but already terminated on 22 August 2013 due to low demand. Additionally, the flights to Antalya offered by Tailwind Airlines were reduced in frequency and served less than once a week.

Germania as the airports main user announced that their service to Palma de Mallorca would resume in the 2014 summer season. They also took over the flights to Antalya which had been offered by Tailwind Airlines during the 2013 summer season. While no airline or tour operator offered flights out of Kassel Airport during the 2013/14 winter season, Germania operated two flights per week to Palma de Mallorca and also two flights per week to Antalya in the following 2014 summer season. In the winter season 2014/2015 Germania operated flights to Antalya and Fuerteventura once a week. The airline also announced flights to Palma de Mallorca, Antalya, Heraklion and Hurghada for summer season 2015 and therefore increasing their presence at Kassel Airport.

On 15 March 2014, the airports' chief executive was fired with immediate effect. In January 2015, the airport was renamed Kassel Airport.

=== Developments since 2015 ===
In December 2015, Germania announced it would reduce flights to and from Kassel due to low demand; the route to Hurghada ceased entirely by 30 December 2015.

In May 2016, it was reported that the airport's construction phase was under investigation for violating rules regarding competition and transparency during its procurement. In June 2016, criticism has been made public that there won't be any scheduled flights during the entire winter 2016/2017 schedule. The state government of Hesse will review the airport's financial prospect in 2017 and might vote for the airport to be shut down.

In September 2016, Germania announced that they will not return to the airport for the 2017 summer season leading to the cancellation of all three seasonal services to Antalya, Heraklion and Palma de Mallorca and leaving the airport with barely any scheduled flights. Shortly after, newly founded German leisure charter airline Sundair announced they would base an aircraft at Kassel Airport during the 2017 summer season serving up to 13 weekly flights to destinations around the Mediterranean. The finance minister of Hesse stated that this would be the airport's final chance to establish sustainable operations before being legally downgraded to an airfield due to a lack of consistent commercial services.

In November 2016, the new German airline Sundair announced that they will base an Airbus A319 in summer 2017. They will operate charter-flights for Schauinsland-Reisen, a German tour operator.

In February 2017, Sundair announced they will base an Airbus A320 instead of an Airbus A319 at Kassel Airport. In May 2017, Amazon.com announced it would end its cargo flights from Kassel to Doncaster Sheffield Airport which led to the reduction of freight operations at the airport by half as Amazon was the largest customer. Amazon maintains a major logistics and delivery facility in nearby Bad Hersfeld. On 1 July 2017, Sundair started their summer schedule flights. Due to the delayed delivery of their ordered Airbus A320 the flights are operated as wet-lease by Cobrex Trans with a Boeing 737 and by other Airlines. On 27 September 2017, Sundair started to operate their first Airbus A320 from Kassel Airport, with the first commercial flight to Palma de Mallorca; the day before, Sundair received their AOC.

In December 2017, the state government of Hesse announced that they would not downgrade the airport to an airfield as previously proposed due to an expected positive outlook regarding the negative financial and operational situation.

In 2024, Sundair announced it would withdraw the sole aircraft which it had based in Kassel since 2017. This led to the loss of most seasonal scheduled routes and sparked further controversy regarding the lackluster utilization of the airport. Shortly after, Corendon Airlines also announced it would not serve Kassel in 2025. On 27 August 2026, Minister President Boris Rhein, Economics minister Kaweh Mansoori and Rheinmetall CEO Armin Papperger signed a letter of intent to create a center for logistics and training at the airport.

== Facilities ==
=== Terminal ===
Kassel features one single small passenger terminal building with basic facilities such as car rental desks and some shops. As there are no jet bridges, buses and walk-boarding are in use.

=== Runway ===
The old airport used to have a single asphalt runway, 04/22 (040°/220°), which is 1,500 by 30 m (4,921 by 98 ft). There was a parallel grass strip north of the main runway, which is 700 by 30 m (2,297 by 98 ft). The new runway 09/27 has a length of 8,200 ft (2,500 m) and width of 147 ft (45 m). The airport features two aprons, one in front of the passenger terminal for two mid-sized aircraft such as the Airbus A320 family and a separate one for general aviation aircraft.

== Airlines and destinations ==
The following airlines operate regular scheduled and charter flights at Kassel Airport:

Airlines	Destinations
MHS Aviation	Seasonal: Heringsdorf, Sylt
Sky Alps	Seasonal: Bolzano

The nearest international airports are Paderborn Lippstadt Airport approx. 70 kilometres (43 mi) to the northwest, Frankfurt Airport approx. 178 kilometres (111 mi) to the south west and Hannover Airport approx. 179 kilometres (111 mi) to the north of Kassel Airport.

== Statistics ==
Year	Passengers
2013	49,557
2014	▼45,587
2015	▲64,926
2016	▼54,822
2017	▲69,810
2018	▲131,817
2022	115,240
2023	106,936
Source: Kassel Airport

== Ground transport ==
Kassel Airport can be reached via the federal highway B7 which is itself connected to motorway A7. The express-bus route 100 connects the airport with Kassel city center (journey time approx. 25 minutes) as well as Kassel-Wilhelmshöhe station (40 minutes), which is an important long-distance railway hub.

== Incidents and accidents ==
- On 14 June 2025, a private plane landing at Kassel Airport experienced technical difficulties and made an emergency landing in a field near the airport. Both occupants, the 80-year old pilot and his 76-year old passenger, were critically injured.

== See also ==
- Transport in Germany
- List of airports in Germany
