= Tailwind Airlines =

Airline of Turkey

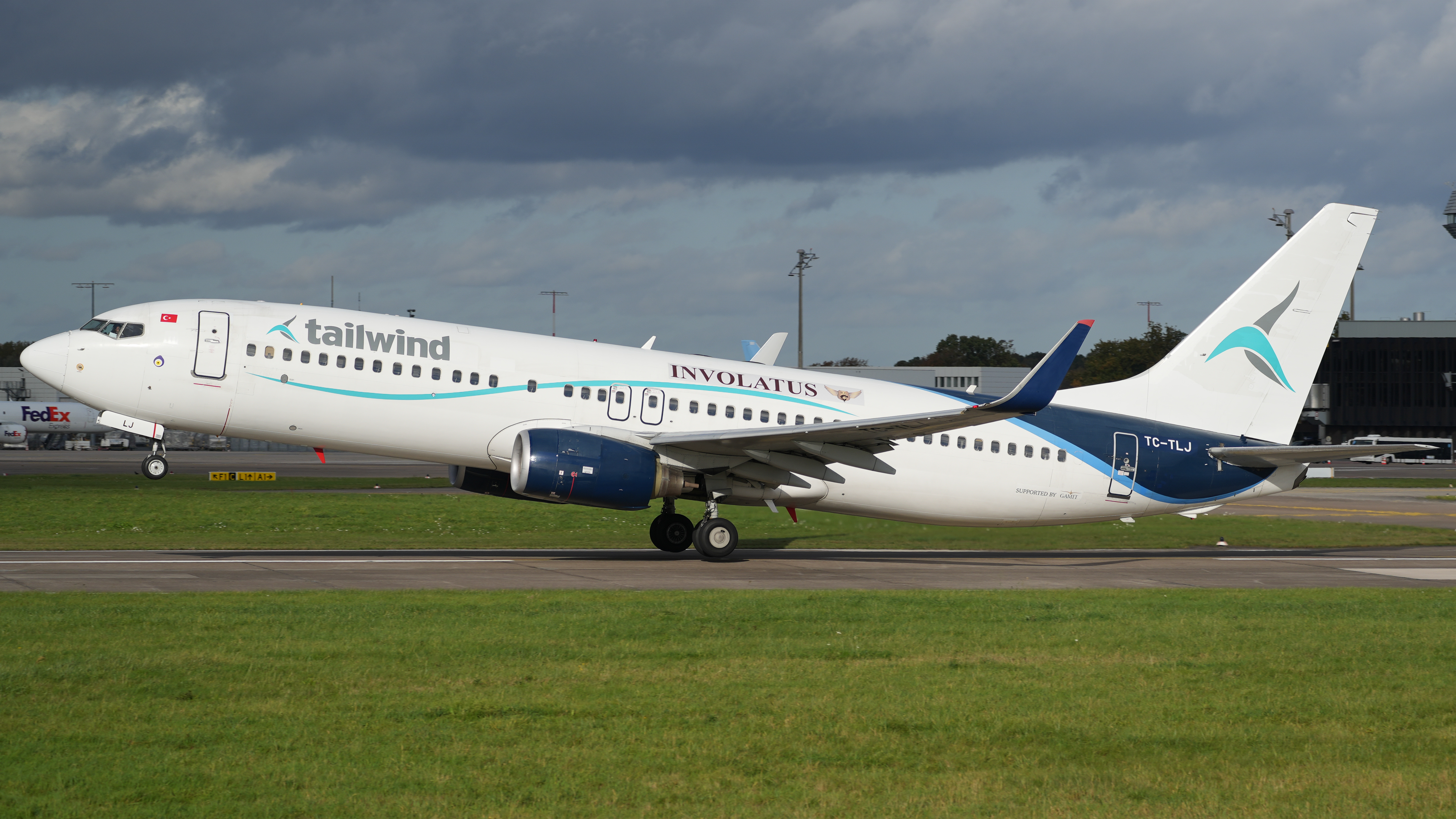
- Tailwind Airlines Boeing 737-800
IATA	ICAO	Call sign
TI	TWI	TAILWIND
- Founded: 2006; 20 years ago
- Hubs: Istanbul Airport; Antalya Airport
- Fleet size: 7
- Destinations: 40+
- Parent company: Tailwind Havayolları
- Headquarters: Istanbul, Turkey
- Key people: Kadri Muhiddin (Chairman of the Board); Safi Ergin (Vice Chairman of the Board); Efe Erten (General Manager)
- Website: tailwind.com.tr

Tailwind Airlines is a Turkish charter airline based in Istanbul which operates flights from its bases at Antalya Airport.

== History ==
The airline was founded as a joint Turkish-British project, with the first commercial flight taking place in May 2009. Founded by Kadri Muhiddin, Safi Ergin and Mehmet Demir Uz in 2006, the low-cost airline operated five Boeing 737-400 as of August 2013. In early September 2016, a Boeing 737-800 with aircraft registration TC-TLH was banned from Lebanon for landing at Ben Gurion Airport in Israel. After a technical check, Tailwind Airlines briefly operated the aircraft, which had previously been leased to Wings of Lebanon and painted in its colors, on its own routes.

== Destinations ==
As of August 2013, Tailwind Airlines flies to various destinations in Europe and Asia:

- Belgium
  - Brussels – Brussels Airport
- Bosnia and Herzegovina
  - Sarajevo – Sarajevo International Airport
  - Tuzla

- Tuzla International Airport

- Croatia
  - Zagreb – Zagreb Airport
- Czech Republic
  - Prague – Ruzyne Airport
  - Brno - Brno–Tuřany Airport
- Germany
  - Berlin – Schönefeld Airport
  - Bremen – Bremen Airport
  - Cologne – Cologne/Bonn Airport
  - Dortmund – Dortmund Airport
  - Düsseldorf – Düsseldorf Airport
  - Dresden – Dresden Airport
  - Erfurt/Weimar – Erfurt-Weimar Airport
  - Hahn – Frankfurt-Hahn Airport
  - Hamburg – Hamburg Airport
  - Hanover – Hannover Airport
  - Kassel – Kassel Airport
  - Leipzig – Leipzig/Halle Airport
  - Munich – Munich Airport
  - Nuremberg – Nuremberg Airport
  - Stuttgart – Stuttgart Airport
- Hungary
  - Budapest – Ferihegy Airport
  - Debrecen – Debrecen Airport
- Iraq
  - Erbil - Erbil International Airport
- Israel
  - Tel Aviv - Ben Gurion Airport
- Iran
  - Tehran – IKA Airport
- Italy
  - Bologna – Guglielmo Marconi Airport
  - Milan – Malpensa Airport
  - Rome – Fiumicino Airport
  - Verona – Villafranca Airport
- Jordan
  - Amman – Queen Alia International Airport
- Moldova
  - Chișinău – Chișinău Eugen Doga International Airport
- North Cyprus
  - North Nicosia – Ercan Airport
- Norway
  - Oslo – Gardermoen Airport
  - Stavanger – Sola Airport
  - Ålesund – Ålesund Airport, Vigra
- Russia
  - Astrakhan - Narimanovo Airport Seasonal charter
  - Grozny - Grozny Airport Seasonal charter
  - Krasnodar - Krasnodar Airport Seasonal charter
  - Saratov - Saratov Gagarin Airport Seasonal charter
- Slovakia
  - Bratislava – M. R. Štefánik Airport
  - Piešťany - Piešťany Airport
- Sweden
  - Kristianstad - Kristianstad Airport
- Switzerland
  - Zürich – Kloten Airport
- Turkey
  - Adana – Adana Airport
  - Ankara – Esenboğa Airport
  - Alanya – Antalya Gazipasa Airport
  - Antalya – Antalya Airport (hub)
  - Bodrum – Milas–Bodrum Airport
  - Dalaman – Dalaman Airport
  - Eskişehir - Anadolu Airport
  - Istanbul – Istanbul Airport (hub)
  - İzmir – Adnan Menderes Airport

== Fleet ==
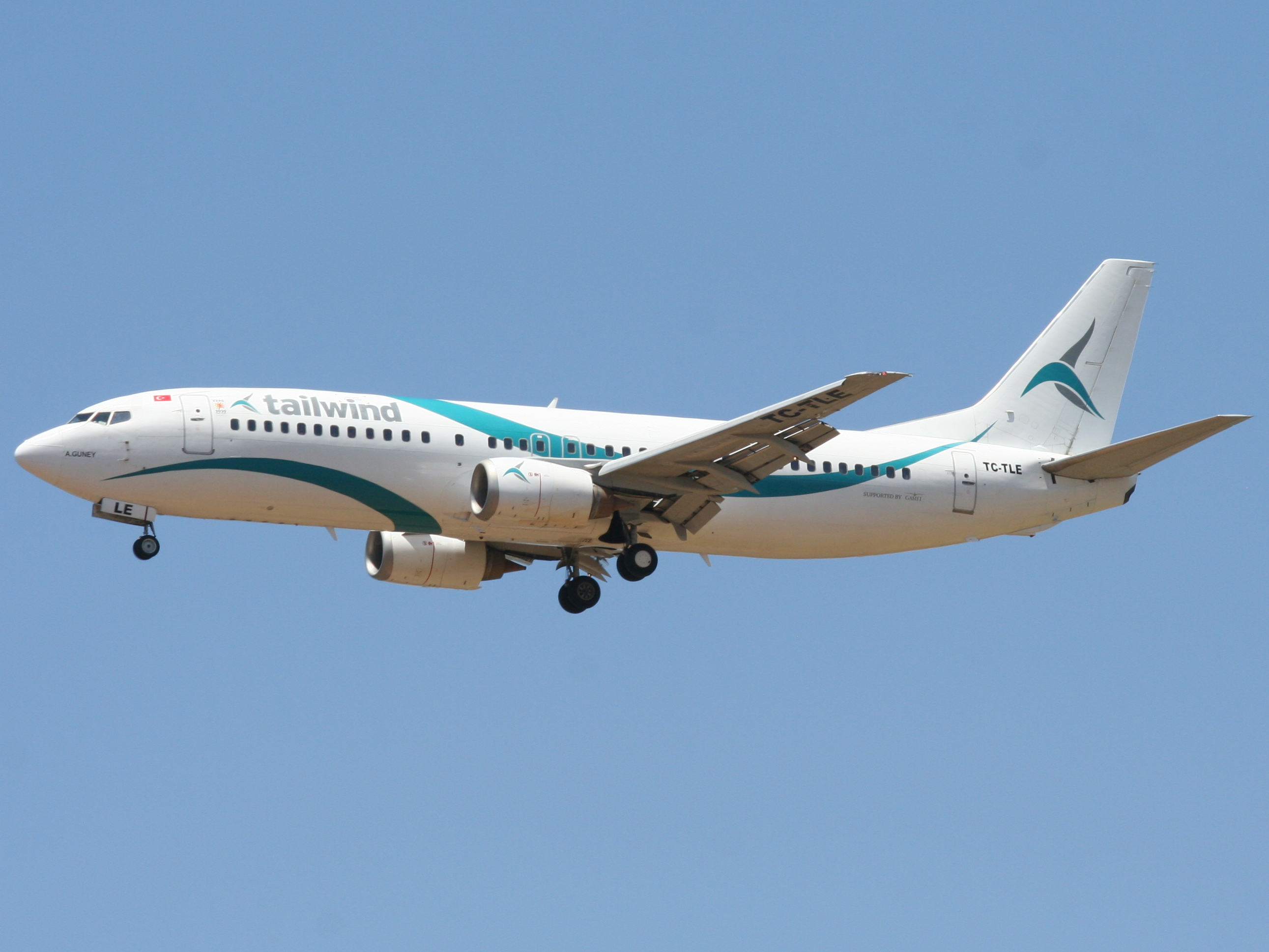
Tailwind Airlines Boeing 737-400

As of August 2025, Tailwind Airlines operates the following aircraft:

Aircraft	In service	Orders	Passengers
Boeing 737-400	5	—	168
Boeing 737-800	2	—	189
Total	7	—	
