= Hoher Dörnberg =

Coordinates: 51°21′18″N 9°20′54″E

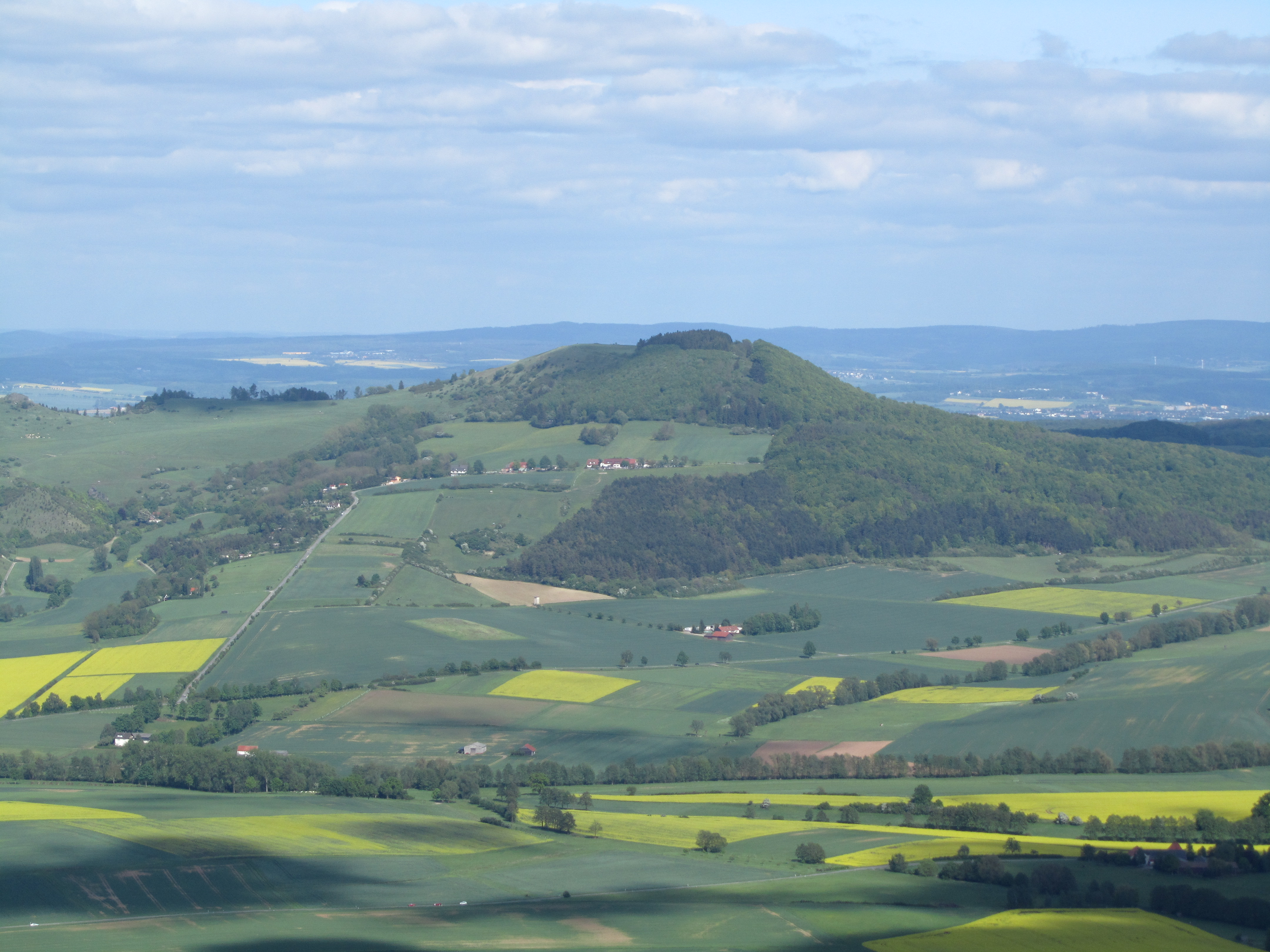
- Hoher Dörnberg, seen from the west (Großer Bärenberg)

Highest point
- Elevation: 579 m (1,900 ft)

Geography
- Location: Hesse, Germany

Hoher Dörnberg is a high hill in Hesse, Germany. It is 579 metres (1900 ft) high. It is located in the Habichtswald around 11 km (7 mi) northwest of the city of Kassel in Kassel district.

== Geography ==
The Dörnberg belongs to the town of Zierenberg and the parish of Habichtswald, both located in the district of Kassel. The Kassel Calden Airport is located about 6 km (4 mi) to the northeast.

== Geology ==
The Dörnberg mostly consists of basalt and tuff.

== History ==
The Dörnberg was first populated in the 3rd millennium BC. In 1910, shards of iron were found at the mountain. In the valley between Hoher and Kleiner Dörnberg, Blumenstein Castle existed in 13th and 14th century.

== Traffic situation ==
The Dörnberg can be accessed via A44 motorway (exit 67 Zierenberg), then via Bundesstraße 251 and Landstraße L 3211 and L3214. There is also a RegioTram service (line RT4) to the stations Zierenberg and Fürstenwald. Both stations are close to the Dörnberg.
