= HolidayJet =

Swiss airline

IATA	ICAO	Call sign
GM	GSW	EIGER
- Founded: March 2015
- Ceased operations: November 2015
- Operating bases: Zürich Airport
- Website: holidayjet.ch

HolidayJet was a short-lived brand name of Swiss airline Germania Flug for flights to leisure destinations.

== History ==
HolidayJet was a brand created in cooperation with Swiss tourism company Hotelplan in early 2015 to operate holiday flights. Germania Flug operated 18 scheduled destinations from Zürich Airport.

However, HolidayJet stopped its collaboration with Germania Flug in November 2015. The brand has since been abandoned, while Germania Flug now operates several of the former HolidayJet routes under its own name, and as of 2019 as Chair Airlines.

== Destinations ==
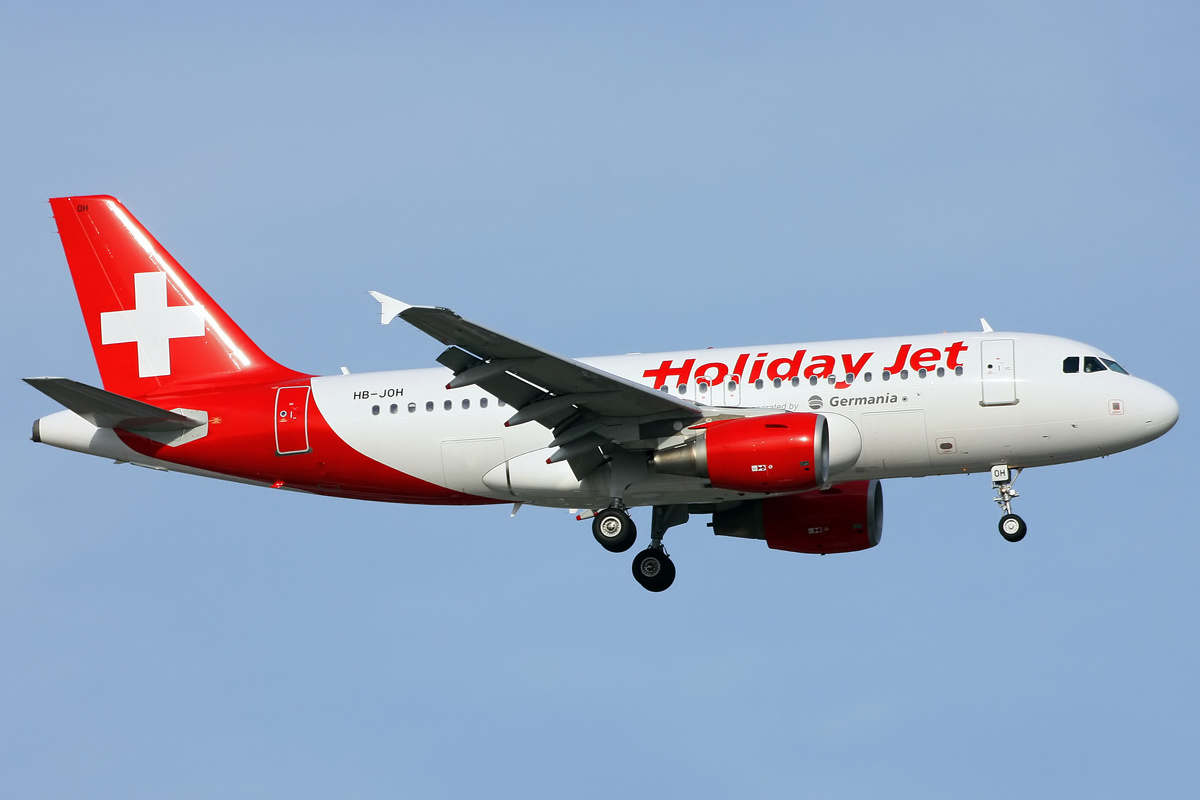
Germania Flug Airbus A319-100 in HolidayJet livery

HolidayJet sold flights to the following destinations between March and November 2015:

Balearic Islands

- Palma de Mallorca

Canary Islands

- Gran Canaria

Crete

- Heraklion

Cyprus

- Larnaca

Egypt

- Hurghada
- Marsa Alam
- Sharm el-Sheikh

Finland

- Kittilä

Greece

- Corfu
- Kos
- Mykonos
- Rhodes
- Santorini
- Zante

Switzerland

- Zurich base

Tunisia

- Djerba

Turkey

- Antalya
- Dalaman

== Fleet ==
Germania Flug used one aircraft under the HolidayJet brand:

Type	In Fleet	Orders	Passengers	Notes
Airbus A319-100	1	—	150	moved back to Germania Flug in November 2015
Total	1	—		
