= Chair Airlines =

Airline based in Switzerland

- Chair Airlines Airbus A320
IATA	ICAO	Call sign
CS	CSW	EIGER
- Founded: August 2014; 12 years ago (as Germania Flug)
- Commenced operations: 11 June 2019; 7 years ago (as Chair Airlines)
- AOC #: CH.AOC.1052
- Hubs: Zurich Airport
- Fleet size: 5
- Destinations: 20
- Parent company: Albex Aviation, Enter Air (49%)
- Headquarters: Glattbrugg, Switzerland
- Key people: Shpend Ibrahimi (CEO) born in Chair Municipality, North Macedonia
- Employees: 150
- Website: www.chair.ch

Chair Airlines AG, branded as chair and formerly named Germania Flug, is a Swiss airline headquartered in Glattbrugg in Greater Zurich and based at Zurich Airport.

== History ==
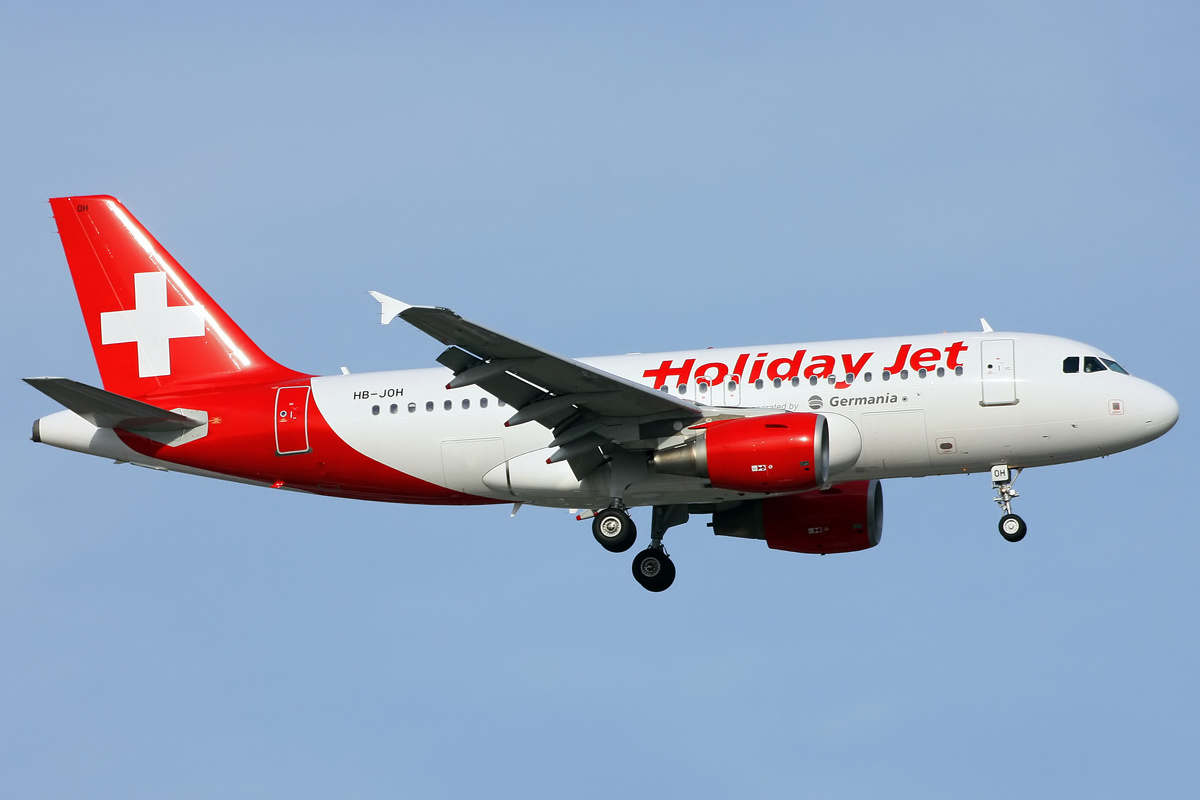
Germania Flug Airbus A319-100 in HolidayJet livery

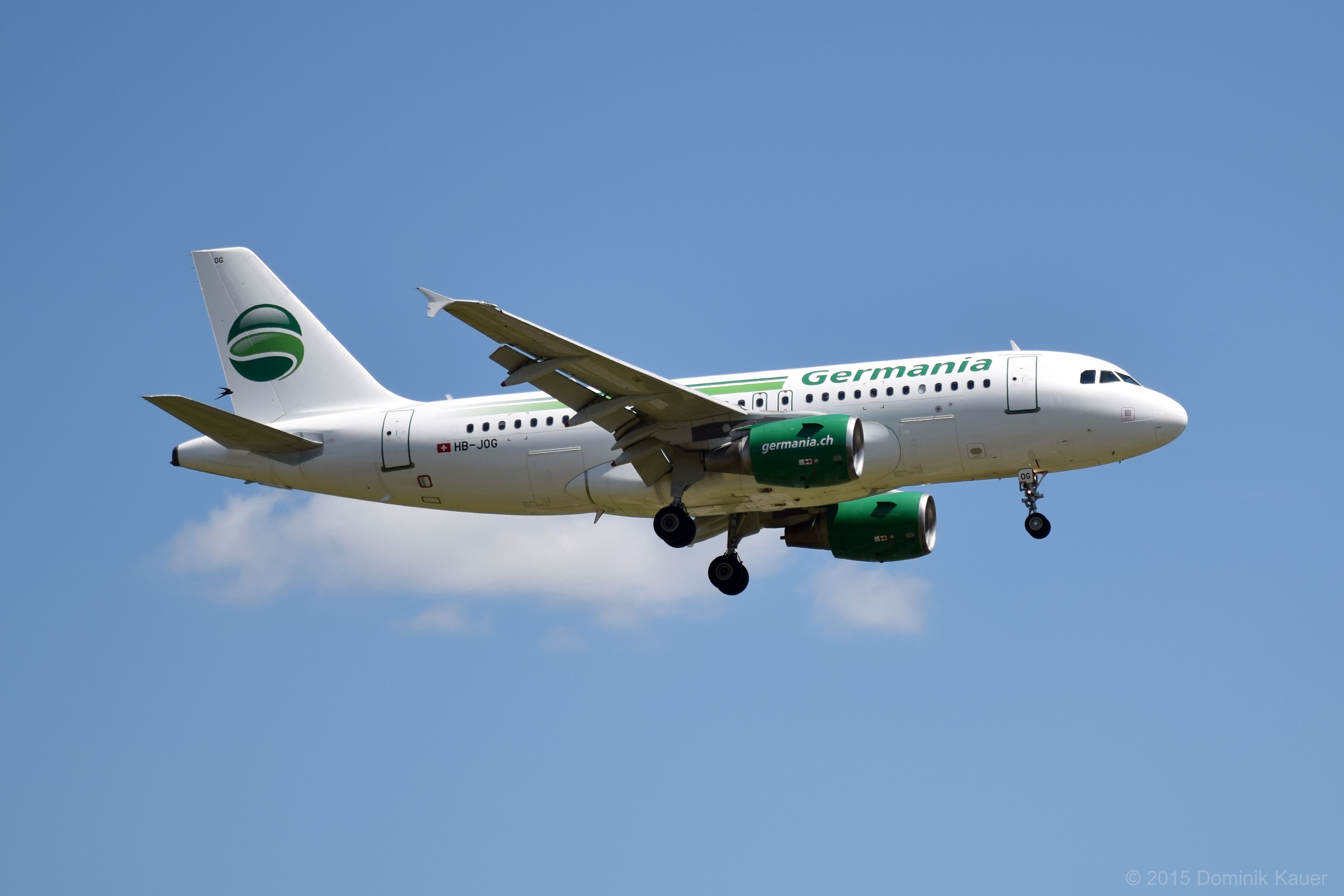
A former Germania Flug Airbus A319-100

=== Germania Flug ===
The airline was founded in August 2014, in cooperation with the German airline Germania (which also lent its corporate design) and Swiss leisure company Hotelplan, with the aim to operate leisure charter flights using the brand HolidayJet. Following the inaugural flight on 26 March 2015, for the summer of 2015, Germania Flug operated from Zürich to 17 leisure destinations in Europe and North Africa. It was planned to continue operating the same for the winter of 2015/2016.

However, from November 2015, Germania Flug stopped its collaboration with HolidayJet and has operated solely under its own brand name since then. In summer 2016, Germania Flug operated scheduled flights around Europe, Turkey, Lebanon, and North Africa. In addition to this, it served Pristina and Skopje on behalf of virtual airline Air Prishtina.

=== Chair Airlines ===
Germania Flug was initially affected by the bankruptcy of its then German shareholder Germania in February 2019, and continued its operations under this name. Shortly after that, it was announced that all shares formerly held by the German Germania branch had been sold to Albex Aviation (which also owns Air Prishtina) and Enter Air, . On 11 June 2019, the airline was rebranded Chair Airlines. On 27 August 2025, the airline announced 6 new destinatons starting from Summer 2026. It was the world's first airline to announce scheduled services to the new Vlora International Airport currently under construction. However as of June 2026 services to Vlora have been cancelled due to the late opening of Vlora airport.

== Destinations ==
As of September 2025, Chair Airlines flies to (or has announced service) to the following destinations:

Country	City	Airport	Notes	Refs
Albania	Tirana	Tirana International Airport		
Bosnia and Herzegovina	Tuzla	Tuzla Airport		
Cyprus	Larnaca	Larnaca International Airport	Seasonal	
Egypt	Hurghada	Hurghada International Airport		
Egypt	Marsa Alam	Marsa Alam International Airport		
Germany	Stuttgart	Stuttgart Airport		
Greece	Heraklion	Heraklion International Airport	Seasonal	
Greece	Kos	Kos International Airport	Seasonal	
Greece	Patras	Araxos Airport	Seasonal	
Greece	Rhodes	Rhodes International Airport	Seasonal	
Kosovo	Pristina	Pristina International Airport Adem Jashari		
Morocco	Marrakesh	Marrakesh Menara Airport	Seasonal	
North Macedonia	Ohrid	Ohrid St. Paul the Apostle Airport		
North Macedonia	Skopje	Skopje International Airport		
Portugal	Porto	Porto Airport	Seasonal	
Spain	Jerez de la Frontera	Jerez Airport	Seasonal	
Spain	Palma de Mallorca	Palma de Mallorca Airport		
Switzerland	Bern	Berne Airport	Seasonal	
Switzerland	Zurich	Zurich Airport	Hub	
Switzerland; France; Germany	Basel; Mulhouse; Freiburg im Breisgau	EuroAirport Basel Mulhouse Freiburg		
United Kingdom	Southend	London Southend Airport	Begins 27 May 2027	

=== Interline agreements ===
- Hahn Air

== Fleet ==
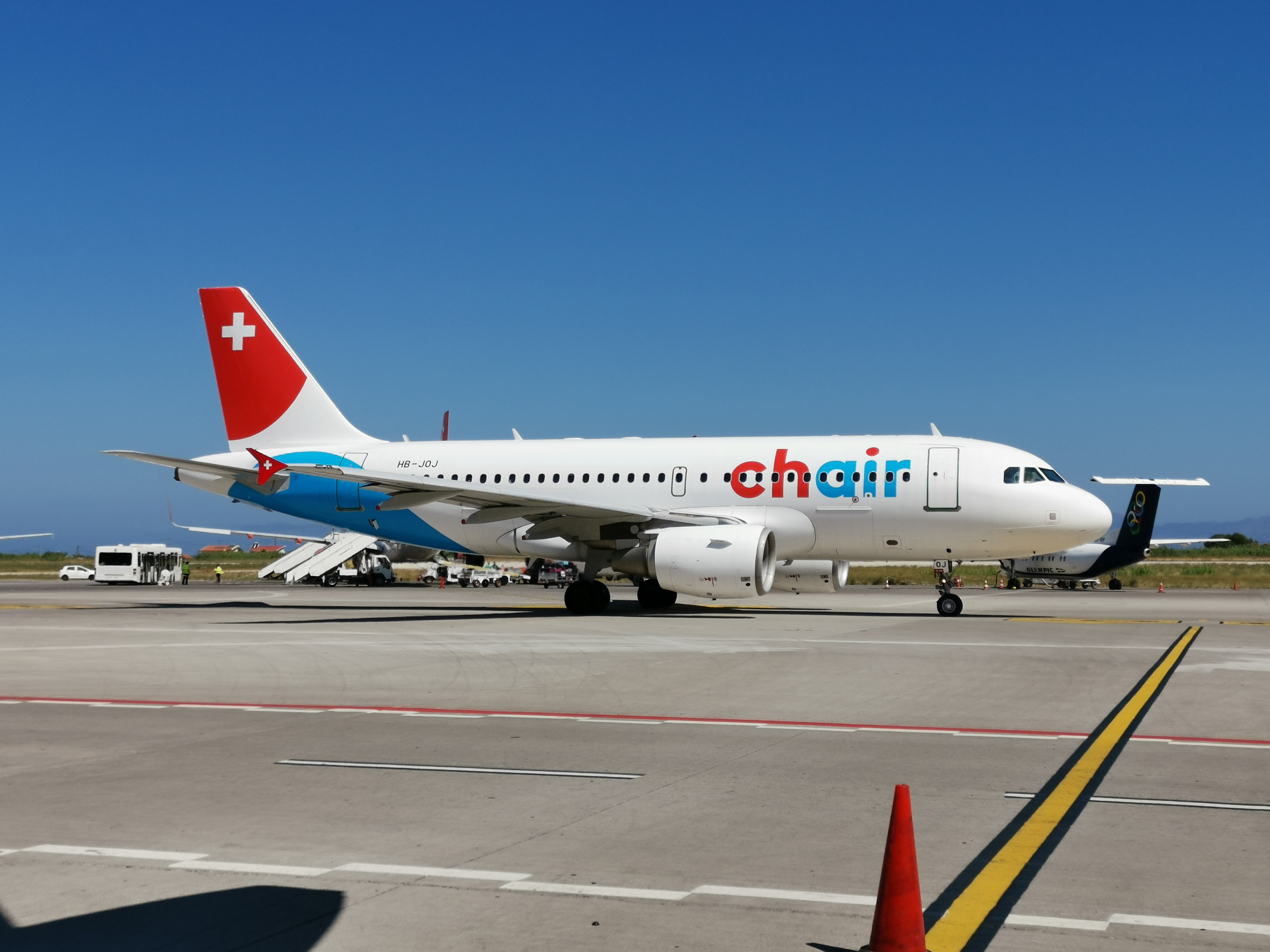
Chair Airbus A319-100

As of June 2026, Chair Airlines operates or has on order the following aircraft:

Chair Airlines fleet
Aircraft	In service	Orders	Passengers	Notes
Airbus A319-100	1	—	150	
Airbus A320-200	4	—	180	
Total	5	—		

=== Historic fleet ===
- 1 Boeing 737-800 (Leased from Enter Air)
