= Kreuzbergkaserne Zweibrücken =

Barracks in Rhineland-Palatinate, Germany

Kreuzbergkaserne, Zweibrücken
- Kreuzbergkaserne
- Zweibrücken, Rhineland-Palatinate Germany
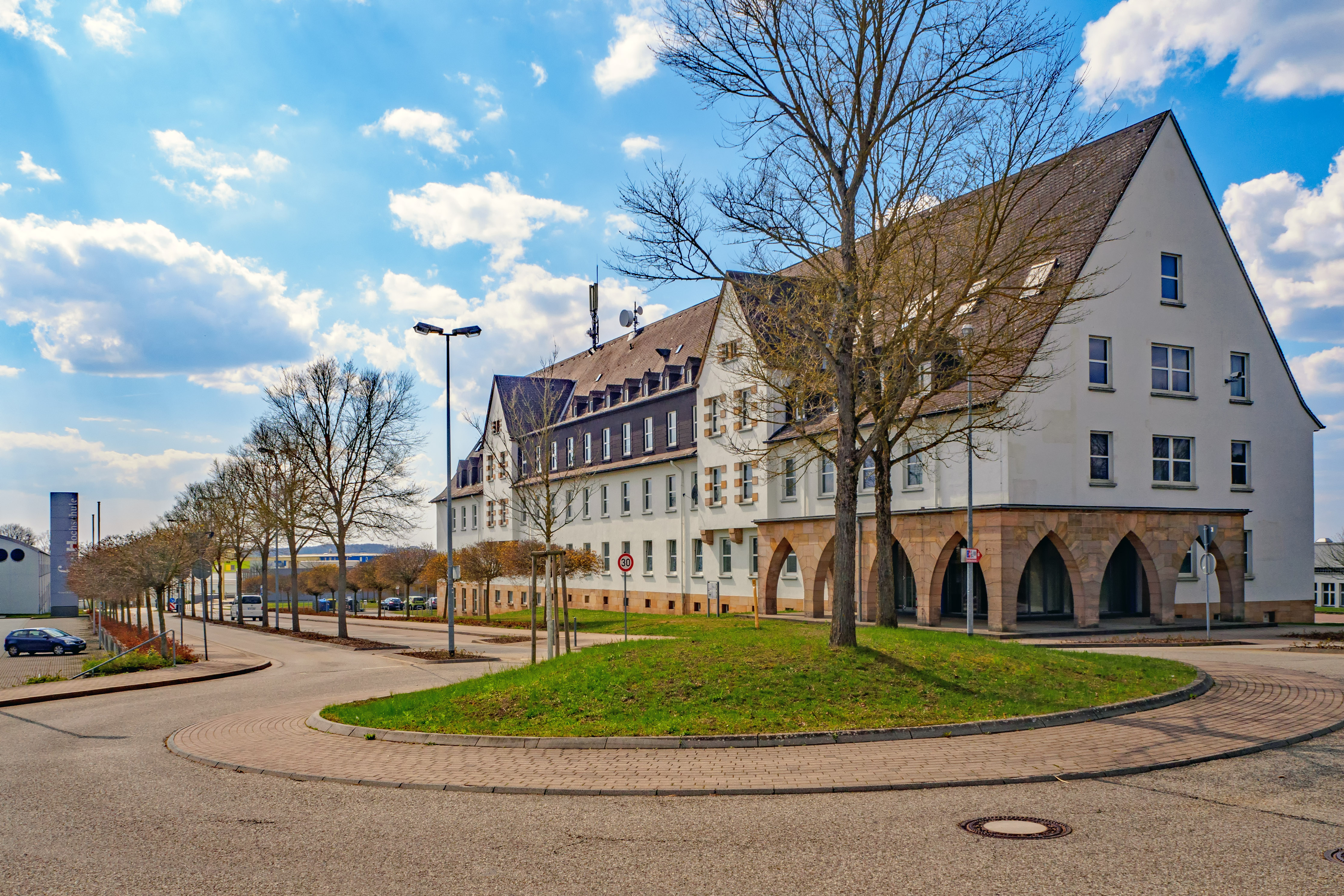
- Building H of the Zweibrücken campus of the University of Kaiserslautern on the former barracks grounds

Site information
- Type: Barracks
- Controlled by: Wehrmacht (1939–1945); French Army (1945–1953); NATO: United States Army (1953–1993); NATO: Royal Netherlands Air Force (1993–2000)

Location
- Coordinates: 49.262209°N 7.36168°E

Site history
- Built: 1937–1938
- In use: 1939–1945: Wehrmacht (Germany); 1945–1953: French Army; mid-1950s–1993: United States Army / NATO; 1993–2000: Royal Netherlands Air Force / NATO

The Kreuzbergkaserne Zweibrücken was a barracks in Zweibrücken in Rhineland-Palatinate. The site is located in the northwest of the city and covers an area of approximately 48.5 hectares (about 120 acres). The Kreuzberg, bearing the same name, is a mountain ridge with an elevation of 339 metres above sea level, referenced to Germany’s standard height datum (NHN).

The etymology of the name "Kreuzberg" can be traced back to the combination of the two elements "Kreuz" (cross) and "Berg" (mountain). During the medieval period, a cross was erected along the road to Landstuhl. The local population subsequently referred to the mountain as ‘the mountain with the cross.’

The mountain’s topography allowed enemy forces to exploit it as a strategic advantage in attacks on Zweibrücken throughout the city’s history. A permanent military camp was established on the Kreuzberg only after Hitler built the ‘Westwall’ during the Second World War.

Originally constructed between 1937 and 1938 with four buildings, the compound served the Wehrmacht from 1939 to 1945 under the name Artillery Barracks (Kreuzberg - Kaserne: Artillerie-Kaserne) it was used by French troops from 1945 to 1953. In the mid-1950s, the US Army assumed control of the facility, operating it as a personnel replacement center and for other military purposes until 1993.

Following the withdrawal of US forces, part of the site was transferred to the ownership of the Federal Republic of Germany. From 1993 to 2000, another part of the site was used by the Dutch Air Force under the NATO Status of Forces Agreement (SOFA). Today, the barracks are being redeveloped for civilian purposes, including housing, a university campus, and commercial facilities.

== History ==
The first buildings of the barracks were constructed in 1937/38. Between 1939 and 1945, the facility was used by the Wehrmacht. Zweibrücken was largely destroyed by an air raid shortly before the end of the World War II (WWII) . On 14 March 1945, a Canadian air raid destroyed almost the entire old town in twelve minutes; around 800 tons of bombs marked the effective end of hostilities in the area.

On 18 March 1945, US troops occupied the city, but withdrew on 10 July 1945 under pressure from France, as the Palatinate was assigned to the French occupation zone.

=== French garrison and renaming of the Kreuzbergkaserne ===
In June 1945, the French army took over the Kreuzbergkaserne and renamed them "Caserne Turenne," after the French army commander Turenne, who had been involved in the conquest and devastation of the Palatinate in 1674.

With the start of French administration, conditions in Zweibrücken proved more challenging than under the previous American occupation. When US forces returned to the Palatinate in 1951, renewed negotiations with France on the use of military facilities were necessary. In 1953, the French garrison abandoned the Kreuzbergkaserne, which were subsequently taken over by US troops. The French troops relocated to the Niederauerbach Kaserne, while the Americans restored and expanded the Kreuzbergkaserne. In the 1960s, the barracks were officially given the name "Kreuzbergkaserne."

=== Kreuzbergkaserne: US Armed Forces logistical, network and communications hub ===
In 1960, the Kreuzbergkaserne in Zweibrücken were handed over in their entirety from the French garrison to the US Armed Forces. With the withdrawal of US troops stationed in France decided in 1967, the Supply and Maintenance Agency moved into the Kreuzbergkaserne. This facility was the first logistical installation of USAREUR to use an internationally networked computer system called "MOBIDIC." Within NATO, the term "Moby Dick" was coined for this system. The supply unit was gradually expanded into a supply center for NATO and US troops stationed in Europe.

The Kreuzbergkaserne housed the Information Systems Engineering Command (ISEC-EUR), formerly known as the Computer System Command. It was responsible for providing technical computer services in Europe and took over technical support for supplying US facilities in Zweibrücken and the surrounding region with English-language television and radio programs. This was done centrally from the Kreuzbergkaserne. Terrestrial transmitters and a dedicated cable network were used to broadcast television programs from the American Forces Network (AFN), which provided news, sports, and entertainment specifically for US military personnel abroad via TKS Cable. The Logistics Systems Office (LSO) was responsible for supporting users of automated supply, maintenance, ammunition, and material booking computer systems throughout USAREUR. It developed specifications for USAREUR systems for operators of mainframe computers and microcomputers.

Until the 1980s, the barracks served as a location for military units and as a supply and recreation center for American soldiers and their families. An American elementary school (grades kinder through sixth) was located on site. They were bussed to the nearby Zweibrücken Air Base for grades seven through twelve. There were also American shopping centers called Post Exchange (PX). Similar to a shopping mall, these facilities offered a variety of goods and services and were primarily accessible to military personnel and their families. American goods not available in Germany were offered at reduced prices, as they were imported and subsidized by the US military. Access was restricted to holders of a US military ID card, which was checked at the entrance to the barracks. The Kaserne had many other amenities including a theater, gymnasium, track, sports fields, day care center, library and a chapel. The post offered activities to the families of service members such as Boy Scout Troop 204, Girl Scouts, a hiking club, a youth center and travel opportunities.

In 1993, the Federal Republic of Germany took over large parts of the site. Part of the barracks was used by the Dutch Air Force, which was stationed there until 2000. Dutch fighter pilots flew their missions for NATO (Allied Air Command) from the nearby Ramstein Air Base. Even during the gradual handover by the Dutch Armed Forces (Royal Netherlands Air Force, Koninklijke Luchtmacht – KLu), a comprehensive conversion of the site began.

=== 2nd Signal Brigade and 73rd Signal Battalion (1960s–1993) ===
During the Cold War, the Kreuzbergkaserne in Zweibrücken were an important location within the communications network of the United States Army Europe (USAREUR). They were assigned to the 2nd Signal Brigade and worked closely with the 73rd Signal Battalion.

From the 1960s to the 1980s, the site underwent significant modernization as part of the expansion of the global military networks AUTOVON and AUTODIN. This integrated Zweibrücken into the international communications structures of the US Armed Forces and NATO.

Underground cable routes connected the Kreuzbergkaserne with Pirmasens and Kaiserslautern and continued on to the European and transatlantic military backbone networks. In addition, the signal units operated redundant microwave radio links to ensure operational continuity.

The Kreuzbergkaserne in Zweibrücken provided access to:

- AUTOVON – the global military telephone network with priority and override levels,
- AUTODIN – the global, encrypted data network between European US locations, the Pentagon, and other command authorities.

Until its closure in 1993, the Kreuzbergkaserne were one of the strategically relevant signal bases and formed part of NATO's international communications backbone.

=== The 327th Signal Company ===
After its reactivation in 1974, the 327th Signal Company was stationed at the Kreuzbergkaserne in Zweibrücken. It served as the communications hub of the facility's military infrastructure: it functioned as the military counterpart to AT&T (colloquially known as "Ma Bell"), operated telephone and cable networks, provided microwave connections, and handled communications. The unit had previously completed two tours of duty in the Vietnam War (1967 - 1968 and 1968 - 1972) and received Meritorious Unit awards before being deactivated in 1972 and reactivated after the Vietnam War - a typical example of the role of signal units as indispensable infrastructure for ensuring communication and control during the Cold War.

=== 9th DPU Data Processing Unit ===
The 9th DPU was stationed at the Kreuzbergkaserne in Zweibrücken during the Cold War and formed a central part of the US Army's communications infrastructure. Its mission was electronic data processing, the storage and transmission of military information, and support for other signal units such as the 327th Signal Company. Using cable networks, telephone lines, and integrated data processing networks, the 9th DPU served as the technical backbone of the Kreuzbergkaserne, ensuring that orders, messages, and logistical data were reliably integrated into the larger NATO communications network. This made it a key component within the military information systems of the period.

=== Role of TKS Cable (TKS Telepost Kabel-Service) ===
From the late 1980s and early 1990s, TKS (Telepost Kabel-Service) indirectly used the US Army's existing military cable routes and lines - including those that ran through the Kreuzbergkaserne - to provide civilian telecommunications services. TKS supplied US soldiers in residential areas and barracks with English-language television, telephony, and later internet access.

Military communications via AUTOVON, AUTODIN, encrypted microwave links, and the Signal Brigade nodes remained entirely under the control of the US Army. TKS relied on parallel use of the physical infrastructure and operated a civilian network within the Kreuzbergkaserne with international connections.

TKS operated a hybrid network that combined military lines (routes, cable ducts, microwave radio links) with civilian telecommunications licenses.

The international connections included:

- Direct cable and satellite connections to the United States to provide US-based telephone, TV, and data services,
- Use of transatlantic submarine cables and INTELSAT connections, later fiber optics,
- Own gateways in Germany, which were technically connected to US military networks but remained regulated under German telecommunications law,
- Provision of services to other US locations in Italy, the United Kingdom, Greece, and Turkey.

As a result, TKS became a significant service provider for telecommunications services for the US Armed Forces worldwide in the 1990s.

=== History of TKS Cable ===
1988

A joint working group consisting of USEUCOM, USAREUR and USAFE developed a supply concept for US soldiers in Germany that would enable television and telecommunications in accordance with US standards.

1990 - 1991

Initial tests were carried out on the use of existing US Army cable routes and connections to the civilian networks of the host country. The main technical partner was DeTeKabel-Service Bonn, a subsidiary of the German Federal Post Office.

1992

An official cooperation agreement was signed between the US Armed Forces and the German Federal Ministry of Posts and Telecommunications. TKS (Telepost Kabel-Service) was formally established as a business unit within DeTeKabel-Service.

Mid-1990s

Expansion into a nationwide provider for US locations followed in Kaiserslautern, Ramstein, Zweibrücken, Heidelberg, and other sites. At the same time, TKS expanded into an international telecommunications provider for several US and NATO locations worldwide.

1998

The license agreement for TKS in the Kreuzbergkaserne became an integral part of the purchase agreement, document roll 1400/98, dated 6 October 1998 (§ 2, paragraph 5, no. 1 – license agreement TKS Telepost Kabel-Service from 1995).

=== Conversion and civilian redevelopment ===
The military site conversion (brownfield conversion) of the Kreuzbergkaserne was divided into several sub-areas:

The southern part of the former barracks site comprises a 10.37 - hectare residential development with 26 residential buildings containing a total of 337 residential units and a district heating plant, 71 of which were occupied by Dutch fighter pilots during the period of NATO use. During military use, the residential area was developed as a self - contained infrastructure and was only connected to the public network of the Federal Republic of Germany after part of the conversion. This took place with the sale of the residential complex to private investors in 1998 with the consent of NATO and the Kingdom of the Netherlands. By 2000, the Dutch armed forces had vacated the remaining extraterritorial areas. The buyer consortium consisted of TASC – BAU Handels- und Generalübernehmer für Wohn- und Industriebauten AG and an individual. The apartment blocks were renovated and are now used as multi-family dwellings. Two buildings near the university of applied sciences were converted into student residences.

=== Conflicts and disputes ===
After the purchase of the Kreuzbergkaserne on 6 October 1998, financial problems and disputes arose. Stadtwerke Zweibrücken billed disputed utility costs amounting to millions, which led to an escalation. Among other measures, the tenants' electricity, hot water, and heating were cut off. On 9 August 2001, the electricity was disconnected, followed by the district heating and hot water supply on 24 August 2001. The press reported under the headline: "Mr. R. G. is not paying his electricity bill, so his tenants' electricity must be cut off!"

==== Kingdom of Kreuzberg ====
One notable episode occurred in 2002 when R. G. proclaimed the "Kingdom of Kreuzberg." This led to a series of legal disputes, including injunctions, coercion, trespassing, and reported death threats against the public prosecutor's office. The foreclosure sale took place on 23 September 2003.

The northwestern part of the site was acquired by the state of Rhineland-Palatinate. This is where the campus of the Kaiserslautern University of Applied Sciences (formerly Fachhochschule Kaiserslautern) was built. Since the winter semester of 1994/95, it has been home to the departments of business administration, computer science, and microsystems technology. The campus has modern research facilities, laboratories, and clean rooms, and offers space for around 2,600 students. The Zweibrücken Public Observatory was built on the university campus in 2002.

The northern part of the site was acquired by the city of Zweibrücken in 1997. The 18.7 hectares west of Amerikastraße were developed into commercial space, with four of the original barracks buildings from the 1930s being preserved. These buildings serve modern purposes, including university administration and commercial premises. East of Amerikastraße, a mixed-use area with residential building plots was created.

== Significance for Zweibrücken ==
Until 1993, Zweibrücken was home to the Kreuzbergkaserne, the French Housing estate near the city center, the Canada Housing (formerly 420 apartments) near the US Airport, and the buildings of US Airport Zweibrücken (today: Fashion Outlet Center). Zweibrücken was home to approximately 9,000 constantly changing US military personnel who regularly trained for missions at the adjacent military training area outside the city near Kreuzberg. The White Barracks (Weiße Kaserne) and the grounds of the Red Barracks (Roten Kaserne) were also used by the US Army in the meantime. After the fall of the Berlin Wall and the collapse of the USSR, the US armed forces in Rhineland-Palatinate initially withdrew from Zweibrücken. The withdrawal of the Americans in the early 1990s brought about a major change in the city. With the departure of the Americans, large military areas were vacated, accounting for a total of one-third of the entire city area. Unemployment subsequently rose to around 21%, leading to a decline in retail demand of around 25%. According to the United Nations (UN), Zweibrücken became the world's largest conversion case.

The conversion of the former Kreuzbergkaserne is considered a showcase project for the conversion of military properties. It has contributed to strengthening infrastructure, creating housing and jobs, and promoting education and research. The successful integration of residential, commercial, and university use has permanently changed and improved the cityscape of Zweibrücken. The success of the conversion has shown that former military sites can contribute to long-term economic growth, housing creation, and educational expansion through strategic planning and targeted investment. The Turenne Barracks remain a striking example of sustainable urban development in Zweibrücken.

=== Integration into civil infrastructure ===
The conversion of the Kreuzbergkaserne into civilian property involved extensive measures to integrate it into the infrastructure. Roads, pipelines, and communication systems were connected to the local networks to ensure their use by private households, businesses, and educational institutions. A heating plant in a former barracks building supplies the entire Kreuzbergkaserne via a district heating network. The heating plant was connected to the Saar Ferngas AG network, which imported natural gas from the Netherlands beginning in the 1960s and from the Soviet Union (later Russia) from the 1970s, with German annual imports exceeding 4,000 terajoules during the late 20th century. The easement (right of gas transmission) for Saar Ferngas AG Saarbrücken became part of the purchase contract of the Kreuzbergkaserne in 1998, based on the authorization of April 5, 1963. This is documented in deed roll 1400/98 of October 6, 1998 (§ 1, paragraph II).

Amerikastraße formed the central access axis of the former barracks site and divides the area into residential, university, and commercial areas.

One legacy of the occupation by the Allied forces after World War II that caused problems during the conversion was the fact that the entire Kreuzberg area formed a self-contained island that was developed according to American rules rather than German law. At the time the privatization agreement was signed in 1998, the upper part of the Turenne Barracks had already been handed over by the US armed forces to the Federal Republic of Germany and subsequently connected to the public network of the city of Zweibrücken. The former internal power network, which had previously formed a self-contained supply island, was connected to the European power grid. The upper part of the barracks, with the university of applied sciences and the industrial park, was developed in accordance with German law in the mid-1990s. The lower part, which was still partly used by the Dutch armed forces, was considered exterritorial territory under the NATO Status of Forces Agreement and did not have to be developed under German law at that time. The Dutch part of the barracks was part of the 1998 purchase agreement 1400/98 during NATO use and was only handed over in full by the Dutch NATO forces in 2000 in accordance with the agreement.

The new campus of the University of Kaiserslautern in Zweibrücken is a source of inspiration for the region. In addition to the range of courses on offer, start-ups are regularly promoted through the start-up rooms.

On the Kreuzberg in Zweibrücken there are around 900 jobs, including about 340 at the university.^

The number of students at the university site is nearly 2,700.^

== Architectural features ==
The remaining historic structures reflect the functional style typical of military architecture of the 1930s. Although the exterior façades have largely been preserved, the interiors were modernized to accommodate present-day needs.
