= Zweibrücken Air Base =

NATO airbase in West Germany

RCAF Station Zweibrücken Zweibrücken Air Base
- Located near Zweibrücken, Germany
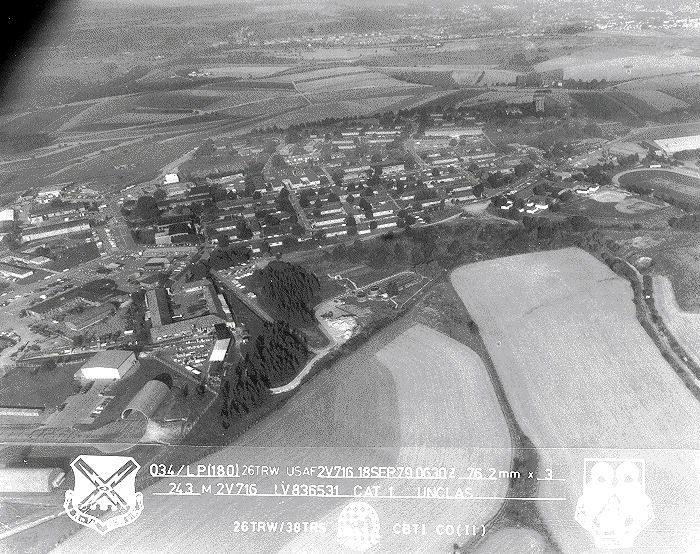
- 38th Tactical Reconnaissance Squadron RF-4C photo of Zweibrücken Air Base, photographed on September 18, 1979.

Site information
- Type: Air Force Base
- Controlled by: Royal Canadian Air Force (1953–1969); United States Air Force (1969–1991)

Location
- Location within Germany
- Coordinates: 49°12′34.80″N 7°24′2.22″E

Site history
- Built: 1950
- In use: 1953–1991

Zweibrücken Air Base was a NATO military air base in West Germany (ICAO: EDAM). It was located 35 miles (56 km) SSW of Kaiserslautern and 2 miles (3.2 km) SE of Zweibrücken. It was assigned to the Royal Canadian Air Force (RCAF) and the United States Air Forces in Europe (USAFE) during its operational lifetime. It was a constituent member of the Kaiserslautern Military Community.

The military facility was closed in 1991 after the Cold War ended, the site now serving as the civilian Zweibrücken Airport.

== Units ==
=== Major commands to which assigned ===
- Royal Canadian Air Force, January 6, 1953 – August 29, 1969
- United States Air Force in Europe, August 29, 1969 – July 31, 1991

=== Major USAF units assigned ===
- 7181st Combat Support Squadron, August 29 – November 1, 1969
- 86th Tactical Fighter Wing, November 1, 1969 – January 31, 1973
- 26th Tactical Reconnaissance Wing, January 31, 1973 – July 31, 1991
- 10th Military Airlift Squadron, November 9, 1983 – July 31, 1991
- 609th Contingency Hospital, October 15, 1984 – July 31, 1991
- 601st Tactical Control Squadron, June 1, 1989 – July 31, 1991
- 612th Tactical Control Flight, June 1, 1989 – July 31, 1991
- 2143rd Communications Squadron, December 1, 1969 - July 31, 1991

== Construction ==
Construction of the base was initiated by French Army engineers and German contractors in 1950 on a section of the former Siegfried Line. The crumpled remains of many of the bunkers of the old line are still in evidence. It was designed by French engineers and completed by German contractors in late 1952. Construction was funded from USAF sources; however, the RCAF assumed control of the Zweibrücken base on January 6, 1953.

== RCAF Station Zweibrücken ==
RCAF Station Zweibrücken, also known as 3 Wing or 3 (F) Wing was one of four RCAF wings, consisting of three fighter squadrons each, established in Europe at the beginning of the Cold War. These four wings were part of the RCAF's No. 1 Air Division, which was formed as part of Canada's air defence commitment to NATO during the Cold War. Other bases were located in Marville, France; Grostenquin, France; and Baden-Soellingen, West Germany.

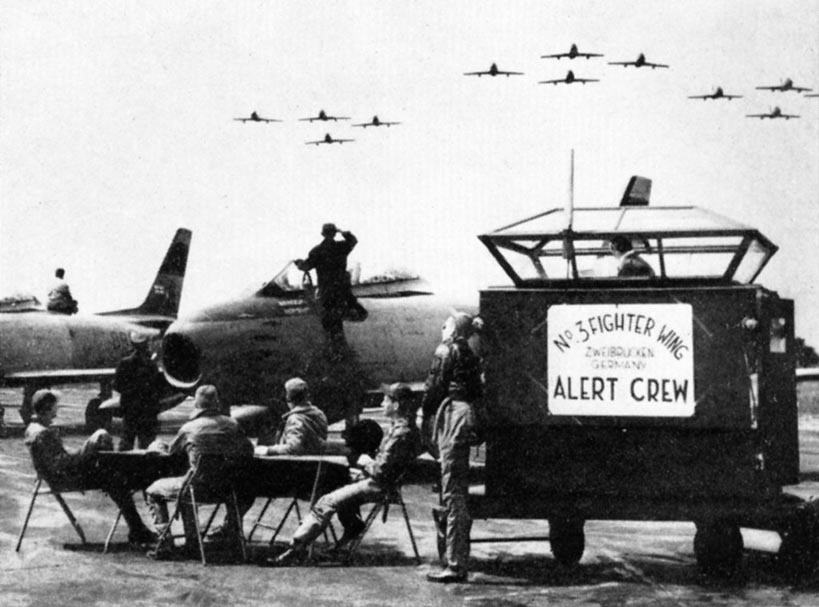
Alert crew at RCAF Station Zweibrücken waiting to scramble as Sabres fly overhead.

Three squadrons flying Canadair Sabres were located at Zweibrücken: 413, 427, and 434. Command was in place March 1953, with the three Squadrons of Canadair Sabres arriving at Zweibrücken April 7, 1953, crossing from Canada on Operation "Leapfrog III", a month long crossing due to weather. No. 413 Squadron was replaced in 1957 by 440 Squadron flying the new CF-100 all-weather interceptor.

In 1959 Canada adopted a new and controversial nuclear strike role in accordance with NATO's doctrine of "limited nuclear warfare" and began re-equipping with the new CF-104 Starfighter that could handle the delivery of nuclear weapons. This aircraft also had a reconnaissance role.

In the fall of 1962 the Sabre squadrons of the Air Division, including those at 3 Wing, began flying Starfighters. No. 440 Squadron was disbanded in December 1962. No. 430 Squadron moved to Zweibrücken from Grostenquin when 2 Wing closed down in 1964.

The RCAF left Zweibrücken August 27, 1969 as an austerity measure following unification of the Canadian Armed Forces. Its units consolidated at CFB Lahr and CFB Baden-Soellingen. Before leaving, they erected a west coast Indian totem pole as a token of their friendship with the local German citizens. At the top of the pole was the Thunderbird, the god who watches over all creation. Below it was a double headed sea monster, the warrior's symbol; the third figure was of a little man who had grown from boyhood to become a warrior, and the fourth figure was that of the same warrior, grown to maturity as a tribal chief.

Upon the departure of the RCAF, control of the station was transferred to the United States Air Force Sixteenth Air Force, USAFE.

Upon taking control of Zweibrücken Air Base, the United States Air Force either renovated or enlarged all base facilities, and procured off-base housing for most base personnel. The base was assigned to USAFE as an off-base installation of Ramstein AB on August 29, 1969, and the facility assumed primary installation status on May 1, 1970.

=== 86th Tactical Fighter Wing ===
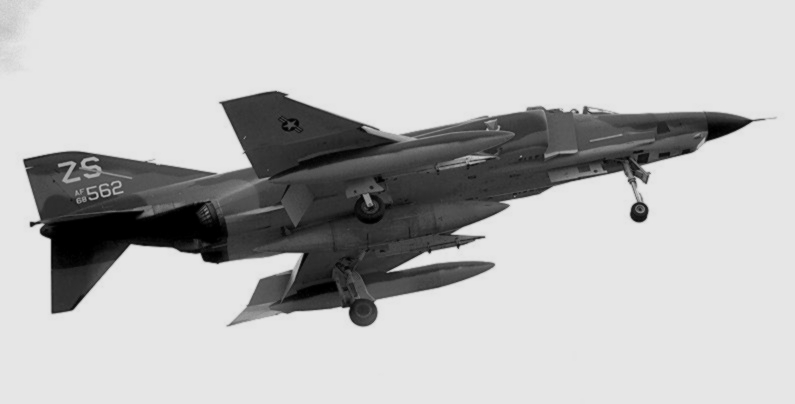
86th TFW 17th TRS McDonnell Douglas RF-4C-38-MC Phantom 68-0562, 1970

The 86th Tactical Fighter Wing was reactivated at Zweibrücken on November 1, 1969. It received its first flying unit, the 17th Tactical Reconnaissance Squadron, on January 12, 1970. The 17th TRS and its McDonnell Douglas RF-4C Phantom IIs came to Zweibrücken from the inactivating 66th Tactical Reconnaissance Wing at RAF Upper Heyford, England. Squadron tail code for the 17th TRS was initially "ZS", then was recoded to "ZR" in 1971.

For 18 months the 17th was the only operational squadron on the base. On June 12, 1971, the 81st Tactical Fighter Squadron with its Electronics Counter-Measures (ECM) equipped McDonnell EF-4C Phantom II "Wild Weasel" fighters was transferred to Zweibrücken from the 50th TFW at Hahn AB when the 50th switched to a strike-attack role, with air defense as a secondary mission. (Note: The EF-4C designation was not official. The aircraft were officially F-4C models).

The 81st TFS, however remained a part of the 50th TFW but was detached from the wing's operational control and attached to the 86th Tactical Fighter Wing for support. Squadron tail code for the 81st TFS was "ZS".

In 1972, tail codes for all 86th TFW aircraft at Zweibrücken were standardized as "ZR", per AFM 66-1, when squadron tail codes were eliminated.

On January 15, 1973, the 81st TFS was reassigned to Spangdahlem Air Base under operation "Battle Creek". The last of this variant of the Phantom returned to the USA in 1979/1980 and was replaced by the F-4G Wild Weasel at Spangdahlem.

On the northern side of Zweibrücken was Kreuzberg Kaserne (Kreuzberg Barracks), home to the United States Army Materiel Command, Europe.

=== 26th Tactical Reconnaissance Wing ===
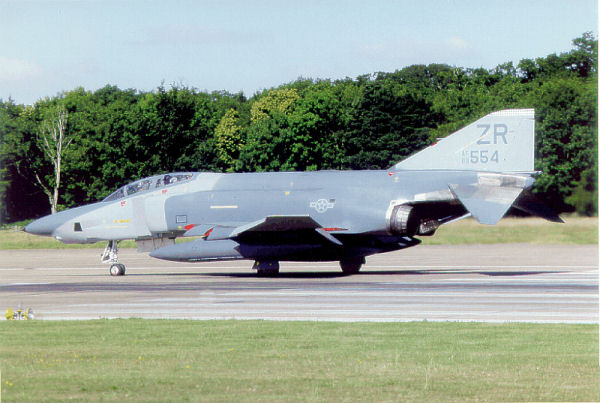
38th TRS McDonnell Douglas RF-4C-37-MC Phantom 68-0553 in late 1980s Air Superiority Gray motif.

As part of operation "Creek Action", a command-wide effort to realign functions and streamline operations, HQ USAFE transferred the 26th Tactical Reconnaissance Wing from Ramstein Air Base to Zweibrücken, and the 86th Tactical Fighter Wing from Zweibrücken to Ramstein on January 31, 1973. Operational squadrons of the 26th TRW were:

- 7th Special Operations Squadron (C-130 Hercules, UH-1)
- 17th Tactical Reconnaissance Squadron (RF-4C) (Red tail fin stripe)
- 38th Tactical Reconnaissance Squadron (RF-4C) (Yellow tail fin stripe)

Note: 7th SOS reported directly to HQ USAFE. 17th & 38th RF-4Cs carried tail code "ZR".

For nearly five years the wing remained stable at Zweibrücken. Then on October 1, 1978, the 417th Tactical Fighter Squadron was activated with a single F-4D aircraft and assigned to the 26 TRW. USAFE planned on equipping the squadron with F-4Es, however, inadequate munitions storage compelled the command to reverse its decision and consequently reassigned the 417th TFS without personnel or equipment to the 86th TFW at Ramstein AB on November 1, 1978, being placed in not operational status.

Later that month, on November 20, the 17 TRS was inactivated due to budgetary cutbacks leaving the 38 TRS as the wing's only in-place operational squadron. High-hour RF-4C aircraft were sent to AMARC, others were reassigned to the 38th TRS or to existing Bergstrom, Shaw, RAF Alconbury or Air National Guard squadrons.

The mission of the 38 TRS was to collect tactical aerial imagery using an array of sensors mounted aboard the RF-4C aircraft and to then report the findings from the imagery to commanders in the field during exercises that simulated real world operations. A variety of cameras and other sensors were exploited by Air Photo Interpreters (later Imagery Interpreters and Imagery Analysts), including low and high panoramic, nose vertical and Infra red cameras. The RF-4C was also utilized as the test bed for the then cutting edge prototype radar system known as Side-Looking Airborne Radar, or SLAR. During exercises, the planes would be tasked to collect imagery and return to base where the film would be quickly downloaded from the aircraft, processed, then interpreted, with the results sent up the chain of command, under strict time lines. Included in this process were photo processors, computer maintenance personnel, facility maintenance personnel and coordinating personnel. In the beginning, intelligence reports were hand written and sent to the communications center for dissemination to the higher headquarters; the process evolved when report writers staffed a variety of computer based work stations to disseminate the reports themselves. Systems developed by both Texas Instruments and Goodyear Aerospace were used as prototypes to hone the process.

Deployments from the United States included EB-57E aircraft from 17 DSES, based at Malmstrom AFB, Montana in April/May 1976 and September 1977. RF-4C Phantom aircraft from 67 TRW (Tactical Reconnaissance Wing) in July 1981 and RF-4C from 123 Tactical Reconnaissance Squadron, Kentucky Air National Guard arriving on Saturday June 28, 1986 for a two-week deployment.

In 1976/1977 a US Army unit, the 2d Military Intelligence Battalion (Aerial Reconnaissance and Surveillance) (MIBARS) flew the U-21A Ute twin turbo-prop airplane (around 6 airplanes) for a short period. The Combat Intelligence Company (Imagery Interpretation)(CBTI Co(II)) was the parent unit of the U-21's. The CBTI Co(II) was a component of the 2d MI Bn.

From April 5 to July 7, 1979 the base also hosted the 86th TFW while Ramstein AB's runways were closed for extensive repairs.

On August 10, 1987, the 26 TRW became the only tactical reconnaissance wing in USAFE, when the 10 TRW at RAF Alconbury was redesignated the 10th Tactical Fighter Wing and assigned to fly A-10 attack aircraft. This left NATO and US Forces in Europe the services of just one US tactical reconnaissance unit and one squadron of RF-4Cs.

The wing continued to conduct reconnaissance operations in support of NATO, USAFE, and the US Army in Europe (USAREUR). The wing also engaged in operational employment and development of advanced reconnaissance systems to further enhance the military posture of NATO in Europe.

=== Military Airlift Command activities ===
On November 9, 1983, the Military Airlift Command (MAC) activated the 10th Military Airlift Squadron (MAS). The 10 MAS flew the C-23 "Sherpa", a small cargo plane that needed only a little bit of runway and less fuel than larger cargo aircraft. A total of 18 C-23A Sherpa aircraft were delivered to the 10 MAS.

The 10 MAS though under the direction of the 322nd Air Division (MAC) at Rhein-Main AB, became an associated unit of the 26th drawing support from it. The 26 TRW provided the 10 MAS all of its facilities and logistical support required to operate the European Distribution System (EDS). The EDS was organized to give the units in Europe a quicker way to receive small equipment items or supplies on a round-the-clock basis, without the expense of the larger cargo aircraft.

=== 609th Contingency Hospital ===
In 1985, another role was added to the wing's mission. On October 15, 1984, the 609th Contingency Hospital was activated by HQ USAFE. The mission of the 609th was to provide a turnkey hospital operation, where the equipment, and supplies were already in place and all the organization needed was the people to operate it, when called upon. This hospital, an old "krankenhaus" was activated in January 1991 in support of Operation Desert Storm and was used at least through March 1991. Some victims of the Scud missile attack in Saudi Arabia received interval medical care at the 609th en route back to the U.S. Note that the Hospital was in the nearby city of Zweibrücken, and not on the Air Base.

=== 601st Tactical Control Squadron ===
In the fall of 1988, HQ USAFE began planning to move two more units to Zweibrücken and increase the support mission of the 26th TRW. HQ USAFE planned to move the 601st Tactical Control Squadron (TCS) and the 612th Tactical Control Flight (TCF) from Prüm Air Station, Germany to Zweibrücken . The mission of the 601st and the 612th was to provide a line of radar detection systems wherever USAFE or NATO needed them. The two units arrived in June 1989, increasing the number of associate units on the base and diversifying the mission even more.

== Military housing ==
Dormitories for single or unaccompanied service members were provided on base. Those service members who had families could get into family housing (there was a very long waiting list for the limited number of apartments), and had a choice between two areas, Canadian housing and French housing. Both areas were located in the city of Zweibrücken, the Canadian being closer to the air base (between the base and the "krankenhaus") and the French being closer to the US Army's Kreuzberg Kaserne. Many service members chose to live on the German Economy their entire tour, because of both the limited number of apartments and the limited floor space in Canadian and French Housing.

Zweibrücken AHS Trojans

== American high school ==
From 1970 until 1993, there was a Department of Defense Dependent School (DoDDS) junior-senior high school called Zweibrücken American High School at the base that serviced the air base community as well as the U.S. Army communities at Kreuzberg Zaserne and Pirmasens. The mascot was the Trojans and it's colors were Columbia blue and white. The school served students in grades 7-12. The school was taught in English and served the families of U.S. Air Force airmen, U.S. Army soldiers and American civilian workers in the area. It was similar to an American high school with sports, Model United Nations, band, choir, Air Force Junior ROTC, cheerleading and other activities.

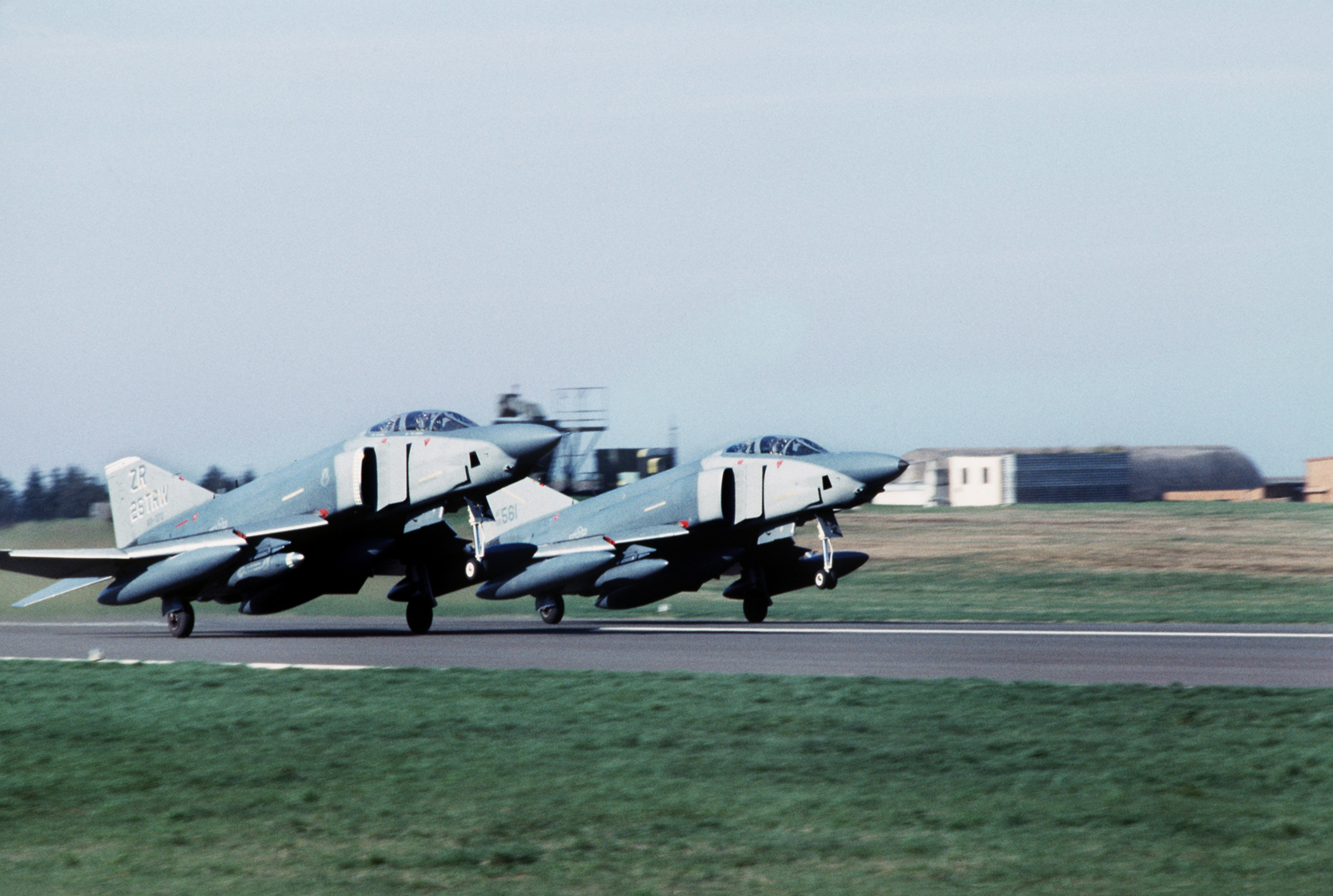
The last RF-4Cs leave Zweibrücken on 12 April 1991.

== USAFE closure ==
With the end of the Cold War, the USAF presence at Zweibrücken was gradually phased out. In addition, the 1960s-era RF-4C Phantoms were costing more and more to maintain. Tactical reconnaissance was being handled more and more by other means, and the need for the 26th TRW was becoming less and less critical to USAFE planners. As a result, the RF-4Cs of the 38th TRS were sent to 309th Aerospace Maintenance and Regeneration Group 1 April 1991 and the squadron was inactivated.

The 26th TRW was inactivated on 31 July 1991, and Zweibrücken Air Base was closed. The facility was turned over to the German government civil authorities.

== Current uses ==
Today, Zweibrücken Airport (IATA: ZQW, ICAO: EDRZ), or Flughafen Zweibrücken is used as a regional airport. Along with the civil airport, a private industrial park has been developed for commercial businesses. Most of the buildings such as the TabVees are still standing and are being used for purposes ranging from storage to industry. In the front of the air base, where the fuel depot was formerly located, now stand groups of factory outlet stores. The commercial airport was shut down permanently in 2014. Since then, it was sold to private aircraft manufacturer Triwo.

At the time the base closed in 1991, the only visible reminders of 3 Wing RCAF was the totem, the stained glass windows of the Protestant Chapel, and the Peter Cunningham Memorial Arena.

As of 2007 the stained glass in the Protestant chapel has been removed and the totem relocated to the "Rose Garden" in the city of Zweibrücken. Only the Peter Cunningham Memorial Arena remains.

== See also ==
- Royal Canadian Air Force
- Zweibrücken Airport
