= TUI fly Deutschland =

Charter airline of Germany

Coordinates: 52°27′29″N 9°42′28″E

TUIfly GmbH

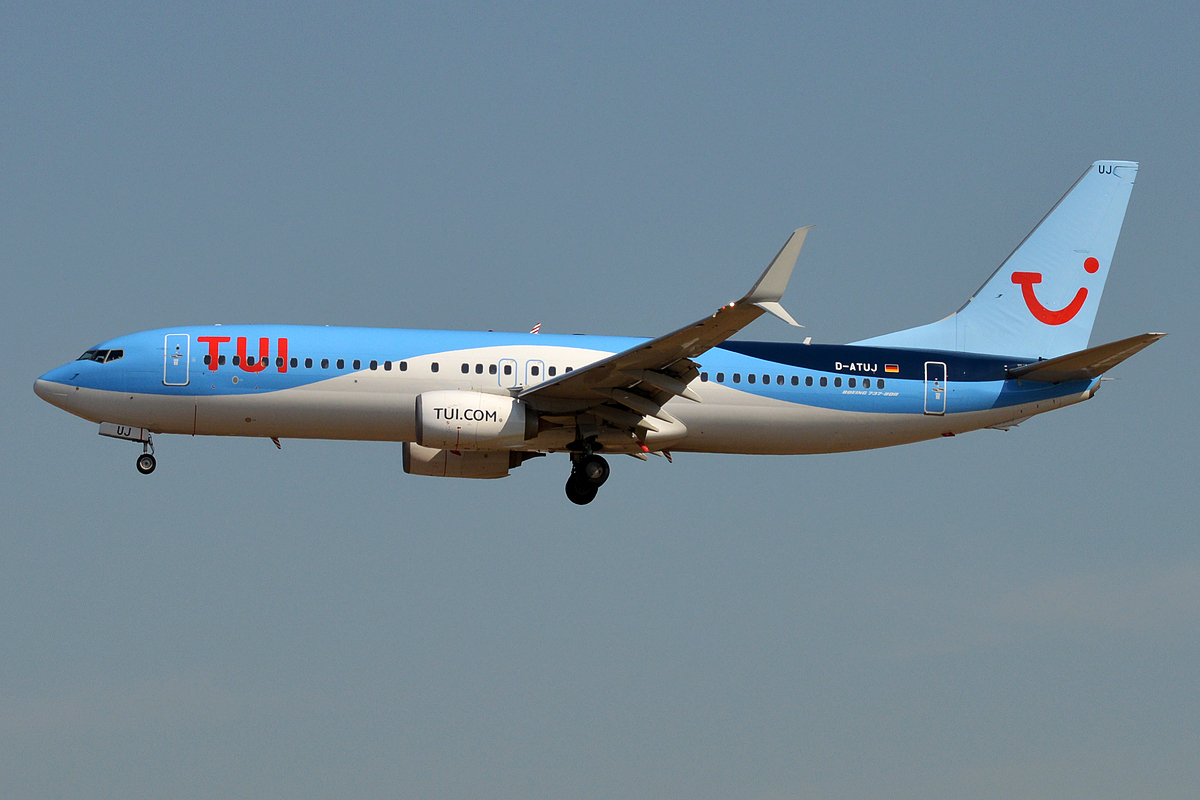
- TUI fly Deutschland Boeing 737-800
IATA	ICAO	Call sign
X3	TUI	TUI JET
- Commenced operations: 15 January 2007; 19 years ago
- Operating bases: Düsseldorf; Frankfurt; Hannover; Munich; Stuttgart
- Fleet size: 23
- Destinations: 38
- Parent company: TUI Group
- Headquarters: Langenhagen, Lower Saxony, Germany
- Key people: Oliver Lackmann (CEO)
- Website: www.tui.com

TUI fly Deutschland (formerly TUIfly) is a German leisure airline owned by the travel and tourism company TUI Group. It is headquartered at Hannover Airport with bases at several other German airports. TUI fly Deutschland is part of TUI Group's airline unit.

== History ==
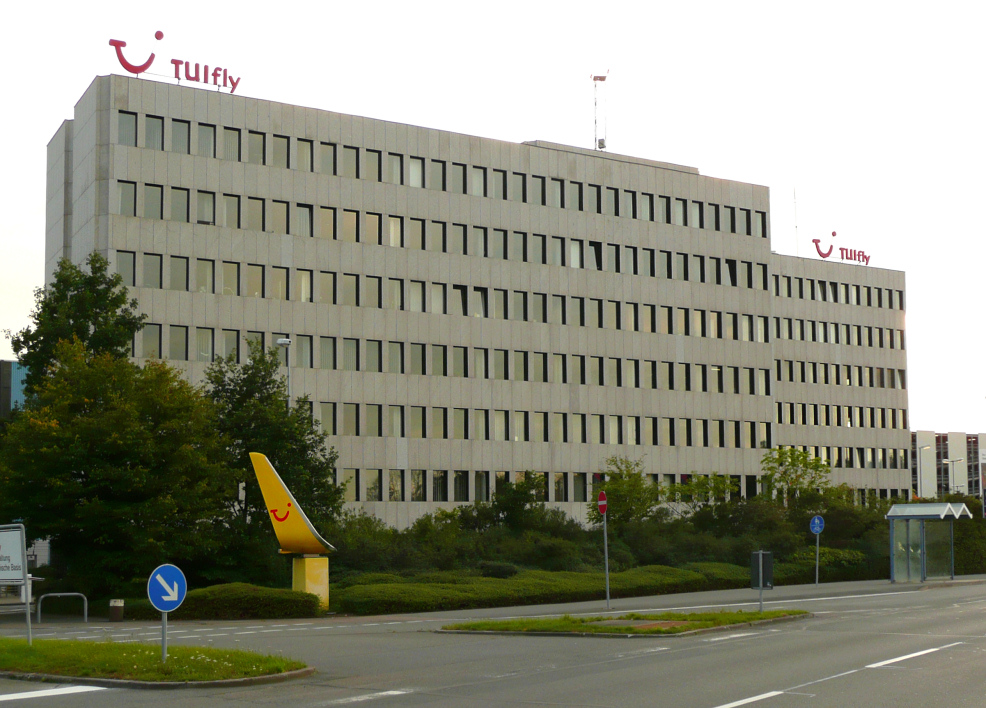
TUI fly Deutschland head office in Hannover

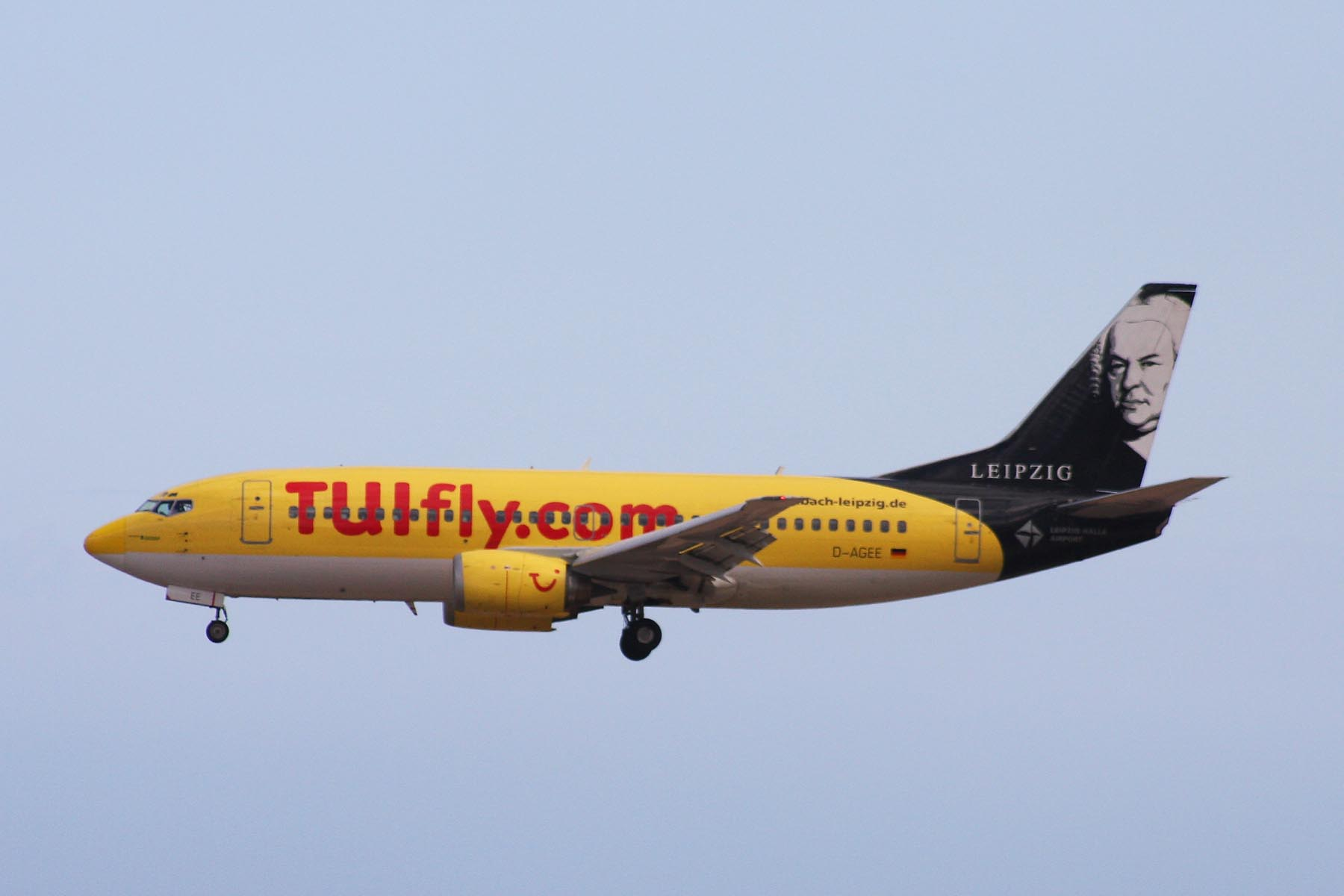
A former TUIfly Deutschland Boeing 737-300 in 2009, promoting the city of Leipzig

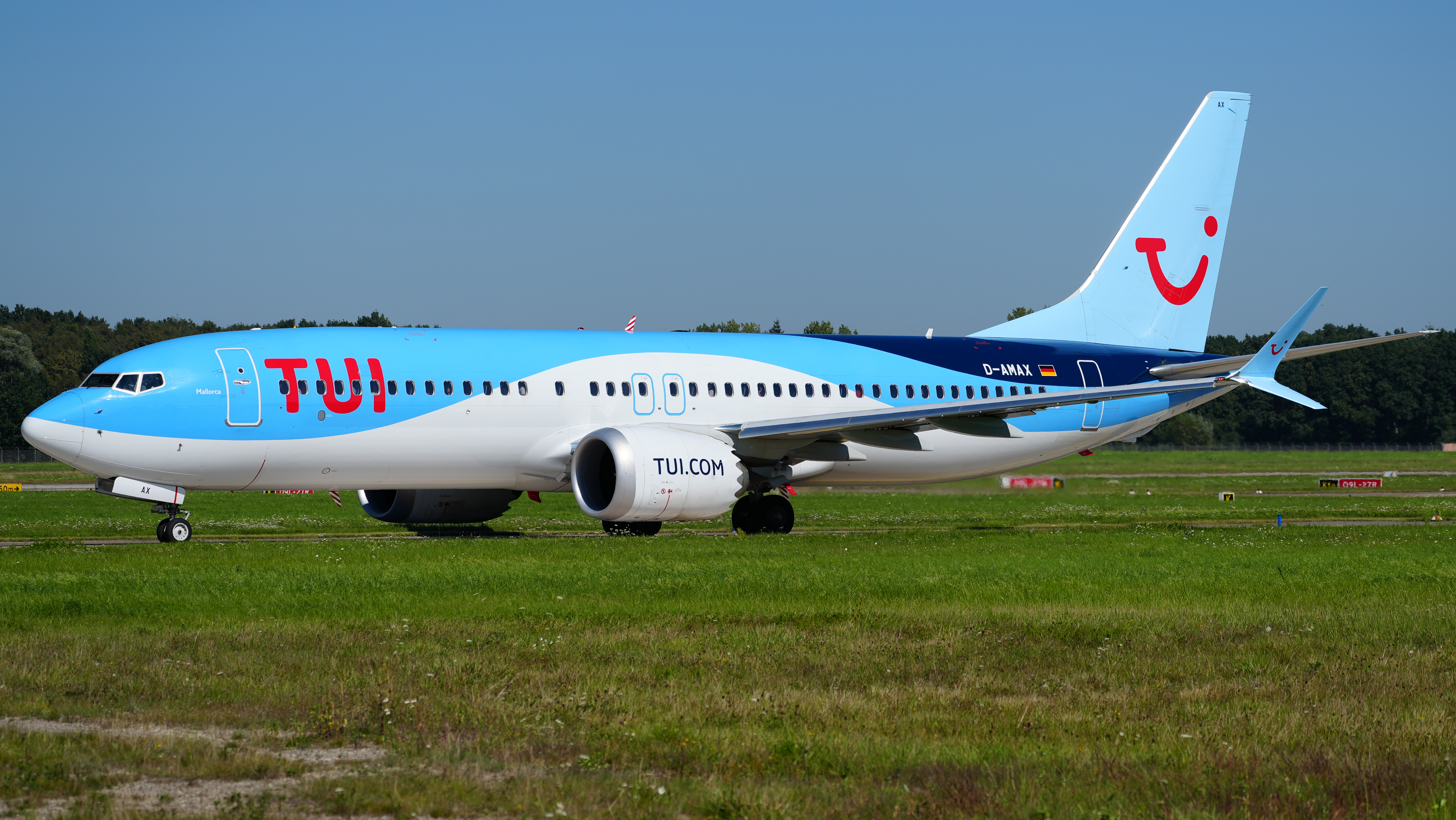
TUI fly Deutschland Boeing 737 MAX in the current livery

=== Formation ===
The airline was formed in 2007 by the merger of Hapag-Lloyd Flug and Hapag-Lloyd Express as a branch of TUI Travel. At that time, when the airline began operation after merger, the first aircraft was already repainted into the airline's new name and livery only months before the current airline took its first flight. When the airline began operations, the airline codes from its predecessors are still in use, and the two callsigns YELLOWCAB and HAPAG LLOYD both incorporated from their predecessors was used until it was changed to TUIJET on 24 September 2010 following the merger.

In the second quarter of 2007, the load factor was at about 79%, compared to about 92% the year before. The company closed its Leipzig/Halle and Bremen bases. On 29 January 2008, plans were announced to merge TUIfly with Eurowings and Germanwings (Lufthansa low-cost subsidiaries) to form a joint and independent holding company, but the talks were ultimately unsuccessful.

TUI Travel confirmed on 27 March 2009 that it had signed a strategic partnership with Air Berlin that would see TUI Travel take a 20% stake in Air Berlin, and Air Berlin 20% in TUI fly Germany. Due to regulatory concerns, this was changed to 9.9%. Air Berlin was also to wet-lease 17 aircraft from TUI fly and take over all of TUI fly Germany's city connections. TUI was to focus on serving the charter market with 21 aircraft. From 25 October 2009 onwards, all German domestic flights previously operated by TUI fly Germany were operated by Air Berlin, as well as all flights to Austria, Italy and Croatia. Most of these flights were still operated by TUI fly Germany aircraft, but were marketed by Air Berlin.

=== Development since 2013 ===
In December 2013, TUI fly Deutschland abandoned its distinctive yellow livery after 7 years and replaced it with a blue design which had already been introduced at TUI fly Netherlands, TUI fly Belgium and TUI Airways. The first plane in the new colors arrived in Hannover on 17 February 2014. The livery was updated in 2016, with titles shortened from "TUIfly" to "TUI".

In September 2014, TUI fly Deutschland decided to relocate their operations at Zweibrücken Airport to nearby Saarbrücken Airport as Zweibrücken Airport faced bankruptcy and an uncertain future. In January 2016, TUI fly Deutschland also announced it would leave Hamburg Airport entirely due to the increasing competition from low-cost carriers. The summer seasonal routes did not resume, and all remaining routes ended by March 2016.

In September 2016, plans were announced to merge TUI fly Deutschland with Air Berlin's leisure operations - which were partially operated by TUI fly Germany - as well as Air Berlin's entire Austrian subsidiary Niki. On 5 October 2016, TUI fly Deutschland confirmed it was in talks with Air Berlin and Etihad Airways to create a new holding company for leisure operations. The new company was planned to serve important holiday destinations from Germany, Austria, and Switzerland. In June 2017, TUI Group and Etihad Aviation Group announced that joint venture negotiations had ended.

In July 2018, the airline announced it would close its base at Karlsruhe/Baden-Baden Airport by October 2018.

TUI Group has 70 737 MAX aircraft on order. The order consists of 28 MAX 10 aircraft, with the remaining variants unspecified as of June 2017. In January 2019, it was announced that TUI fly Deutschland would receive 25 of these 737 MAX 8 aircraft by 2023.

After the demise of Germania in early 2019, TUI fly Deutschland announced it would base aircraft at Nuremberg Airport to fly to several leisure destinations. In November 2019, it was announced that the airline planned to operate its long-haul flights to destinations in the Caribbean and Mexico, similar to its sister airlines. Initially, the airline was to have taken on two Boeing 787s to operate these flights with plans to increase the number in the future. The flights were originally planned to begin in the Winter 2020/21 season, with scheduled and charter services to the Dominican Republic, Mexico, Jamaica, and Barbados. The plans were shelved for the foreseeable future in the wake of the COVID-19 pandemic.

In October 2020, TUI fly Deutschland retired their last of their 20 Boeing 737-700s. Several of them had been operated on a long-term wetlease basis on behalf of now defunct Air Berlin. In December 2020, the airline announced a major downsizing in operations with layoffs and a reduction from over 30 to 17 aircraft while also terminating all services from Cologne/Bonn, Basel/Mulhouse, Paderborn/Lippstadt and Karlsruhe/Baden-Baden.

== Operations ==
TUI fly Deutschland offers both charter and scheduled flights with about 60% of all seats sold directly, 30% as a part of a TUI holiday package, and 10% by other agencies. TUI fly Deutschland itself offers drinks, snacks, and meals on flights to and from Cape Verde, Egypt, Greece, Israel, southern Italy, Morocco, Portugal, Spain including the Canary Islands, and Tunisia. Hot meals are served on the longest flights, including those to the Canary Islands, Cape Verde, Egypt, and Madeira.

== Destinations ==
TUI fly Deutschland operates from several German airports to leisure destinations mainly around the Mediterranean, such as Spain and Greece. The airline does not operate long-haul flights contrary with the other TUI Airlines. As of April 2024, TUI fly serves the following destinations:

Country / Territory	City	Airport	Notes	Refs
Cape Verde	Boa Vista	Aristides Pereira International Airport		
Cape Verde	Sal	Amílcar Cabral International Airport		
Cyprus	Larnaca	Larnaca International Airport	Seasonal	
Egypt	Hurghada	Hurghada International Airport		
Egypt	Luxor	Luxor International Airport		
Egypt	Marsa Alam	Marsa Alam International Airport		
Germany	Cologne/Bonn	Cologne Bonn Airport	Terminated	
Germany	Düsseldorf	Düsseldorf Airport	Base	
Germany	Frankfurt	Frankfurt Airport	Base	
Germany	Hamburg	Hamburg Airport	Base	
Germany	Hanover	Hannover Airport	Base	
Germany	Karlsruhe/Baden-Baden	Karlsruhe/Baden-Baden Airport	Terminated	
Germany	Leipzig/Halle	Leipzig/Halle Airport	Terminated	
Germany	Munich	Munich Airport	Base	
Germany	Nuremberg	Nuremberg Airport	Terminated	
Germany	Paderborn/Lippstadt	Paderborn Lippstadt Airport	Terminated	
Germany	Saarbrücken	Saarbrücken Airport	Terminated	
Germany	Stuttgart	Stuttgart Airport	Base	
Greece	Corfu	Corfu International Airport	Seasonal	
Greece	Heraklion	Heraklion International Airport "Nikos Kazantzakis"	Seasonal	
Greece	Kos	Kos International Airport	Seasonal	
Greece	Patras	Patras Araxos Airport	Seasonal	
Greece	Rhodes	Rhodes International Airport	Seasonal	
Morocco	Agadir	Agadir–Al Massira Airport		
Portugal	Faro	Faro Airport	Seasonal	
Portugal	Funchal	Madeira Airport		
Slovenia	Ljubljana	Ljubljana Airport	Begins 4 May 2027	
Spain	Fuerteventura	Fuerteventura Airport		
Spain	Ibiza	Ibiza Airport	Seasonal	
Spain	Jerez de la Frontera	Jerez Airport	Seasonal	
Spain	Lanzarote	Lanzarote Airport		
Spain	Las Palmas	Gran Canaria Airport		
Spain	Mahón	Menorca Airport	Seasonal	
Spain	Málaga	Málaga Airport	Seasonal	
Spain	Palma de Mallorca	Palma de Mallorca Airport	Seasonal	
Spain	Tenerife	Tenerife South Airport		
Switzerland; France; Germany	Basel; Mulhouse; Freiburg	EuroAirport Basel–Mulhouse–Freiburg		
Tunisia	Djerba	Djerba–Zarzis International Airport	Seasonal	
Tunisia	Enfidha	Enfidha–Hammamet International Airport	Seasonal	
Turkey	Antalya	Antalya Airport	Terminated	
Turkey	Dalaman	Dalaman Airport	Seasonal	

== Fleet ==
=== Current fleet ===
As of July 2026, TUI fly Deutschland operates an all-Boeing 737 fleet composed of the following aircraft:

Aircraft	In service	Orders	Passengers	Notes
Boeing 737-800	13	1	186	One aircraft to be transferred or leased from TUI Airways.
Boeing 737-800	13	1	189	One aircraft to be transferred or leased from TUI Airways.
Boeing 737 MAX 8	10	15	189	
Total	23	15		

=== Former fleet ===
As of August 2025, TUI fly Deutschland operated 15 Boeing 737-800 and 7 Boeing 737-8 MAX

== See also ==
- List of airlines of Germany
