= Zweibrücken Airport =

Airport in Germany

Zweibrücken Airport Flughafen Zweibrücken
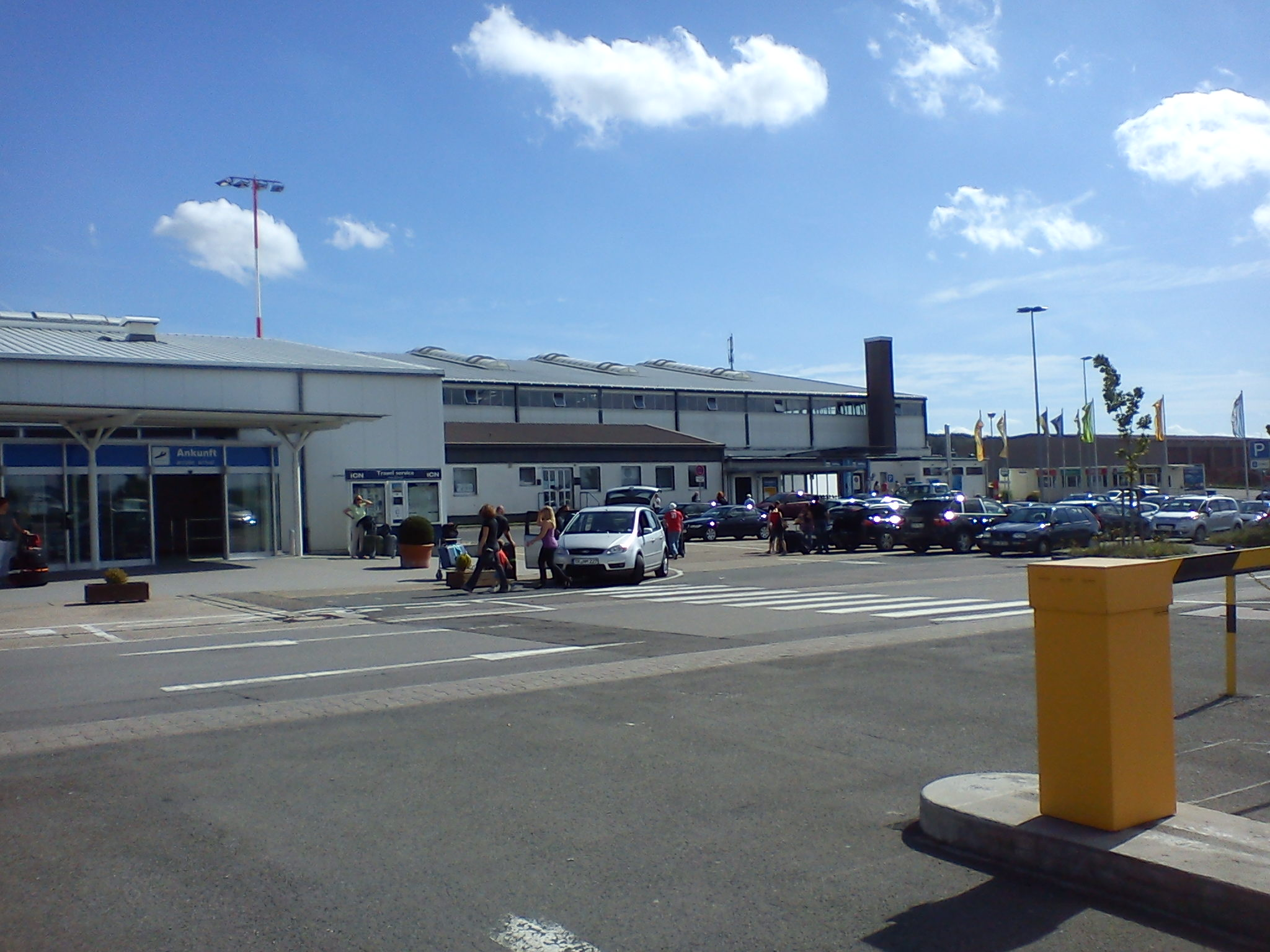
- IATA: ZQW; ICAO: EDRZ

Summary
- Airport type: General Aviation
- Serves: Zweibrücken, Germany
- Elevation AMSL: 1,133 ft / 345 m
- Coordinates: 49°12′34″N 07°24′02″E
- Website: edrz-airport.de

Map
- Location of airport in Rhineland-Palatinate ZQW (Germany) ZQW (Europe)

Runways
| Direction | Length | | Surface |
| Direction | ft | m | Surface |
|---|---|---|---|
| 03/21 | 8,776 | 2,675 | Concrete |

Statistics (2013)
- Passengers: 220,740 (-9,1%)
- Aircraft movements: 11,855 (-10,4%)
- Cargo volume: 81 tons (+103%)
- Source: AIP at German air traffic control.

Zweibrücken Airport (IATA: ZQW, ICAO: EDRZ), or Flughafen Zweibrücken in German, is a regional airport and former minor international airport in Zweibrücken, Germany. It was the smaller of the two passenger airports in the state of Rhineland-Palatinate, the other being Frankfurt-Hahn Airport. Zweibrücken currently only features general aviation, since scheduled air services ceased in November 2014 due to the airport's financial difficulties.

== History ==
=== Development into a civil airport ===
Zweibrücken Airport is located on the site of the former Zweibrücken Air Base which was closed in 1991 following the end of Operation Desert Storm. The former site was reopened as a converted commercial airport on 1 September 1994.

In 2006, Germanwings began twice-daily service to Berlin Schönefeld Airport, but ceased them in 2011 due to expensive airports taxes. The airport also used to have regular scheduled service operated by Ryanair to London Stansted Airport. The service was announced on 27 May 2008, but ceased already one year later in May 2009. 264,247 passengers used the airport in 2010, decreasing to 242,880 passengers in 2012.

A twice per week service was operated between Zweibrücken and Antalya by Sky Airlines until the airline ceased operations due to financial problems in 2013. These flights were replaced by Atlasjet during summer 2013 season, and were taken over by Freebird Airlines for summer 2014. On 3 November 2013, Air Berlin stopped its weekly summer seasonal route to Palma de Mallorca on behalf of TUI, and were replaced by TUIfly and Germania for the 2014 summer season. In July 2014, TUIfly inaugurated the new seasonal route to Ankara, the airport's third destination in Turkey after Antalya and Istanbul. TUIfly operated eight routes out of Zweibrücken Airport, making it one of their focus cities.

=== Bankruptcy ===
In July 2014, it was reported that the European Commission decided that up to 56 million Euros of subsidies for the airport were illegal and needed to be paid back. Due to this decision, on 24 July, Zweibrücken Airport filed for bankruptcy. One of the reasons for the Commission's decision is the close proximity to Saarbrücken Airport, which exists much longer.

While it was planned to keep the airport operating for general aviation operations, all commercial passenger operations were expected to cease by the end of the 2014 summer schedule. TUIfly decided to provide financial support for the airport to guarantee uninterrupted operations until the end of their summer schedule in November 2014.

However, in September 2014, TUIfly announced the closure of their Zweibrücken base as of 8 November 2014. As a replacement, several of their eight scheduled leisure routes, for example to Palma de Mallorca and Gran Canaria, will be relocated to nearby Saarbrücken Airport. Additionally, Pegasus Airlines' scheduled seasonal service to Istanbul ceased by 29 September 2014 without resumption in 2015. The few other remaining summer seasonal charter flights, for example those of Air VIA to Burgas, moved to Saarbrücken for the 2015 summer season as well.

The last scheduled flight took off from Zweibrücken at 13:40 p.m. on 3 November to Fuerteventura, also remaining as the last TUIfly operation at the airport and marking the closure of its focus city. Since that day, all scheduled operations at the airport ceased for the then upcoming entire winter season while most of the staff has been laid off due to a lack of funding to keep operations running.

== Facilities ==
Zweibrücken Airport features a small terminal building equipped with three aircraft stands next to it. As there are no jet bridges, walk-boarding is used. Before bankruptcy, the airport could handle mid-sized aircraft such as the Boeing 737 and the Airbus A320 family.

== Airlines and destinations ==
All scheduled operations at Zweibrücken Airport ceased by 3 November 2014 due to a lack of funding for the upcoming winter season. The airport used to feature scheduled and charter flights to leisure destinations around the Mediterranean. There was no resumption of services for the 2015 summer season as all former airlines at Zweibrücken either terminated their services to the area, such as Pegasus Airlines, or relocated their routes to Saarbrücken instead.

The nearest other minor international airport is Saarbrücken Airport, approximately 40 km (25 mi) away.

== Statistics ==
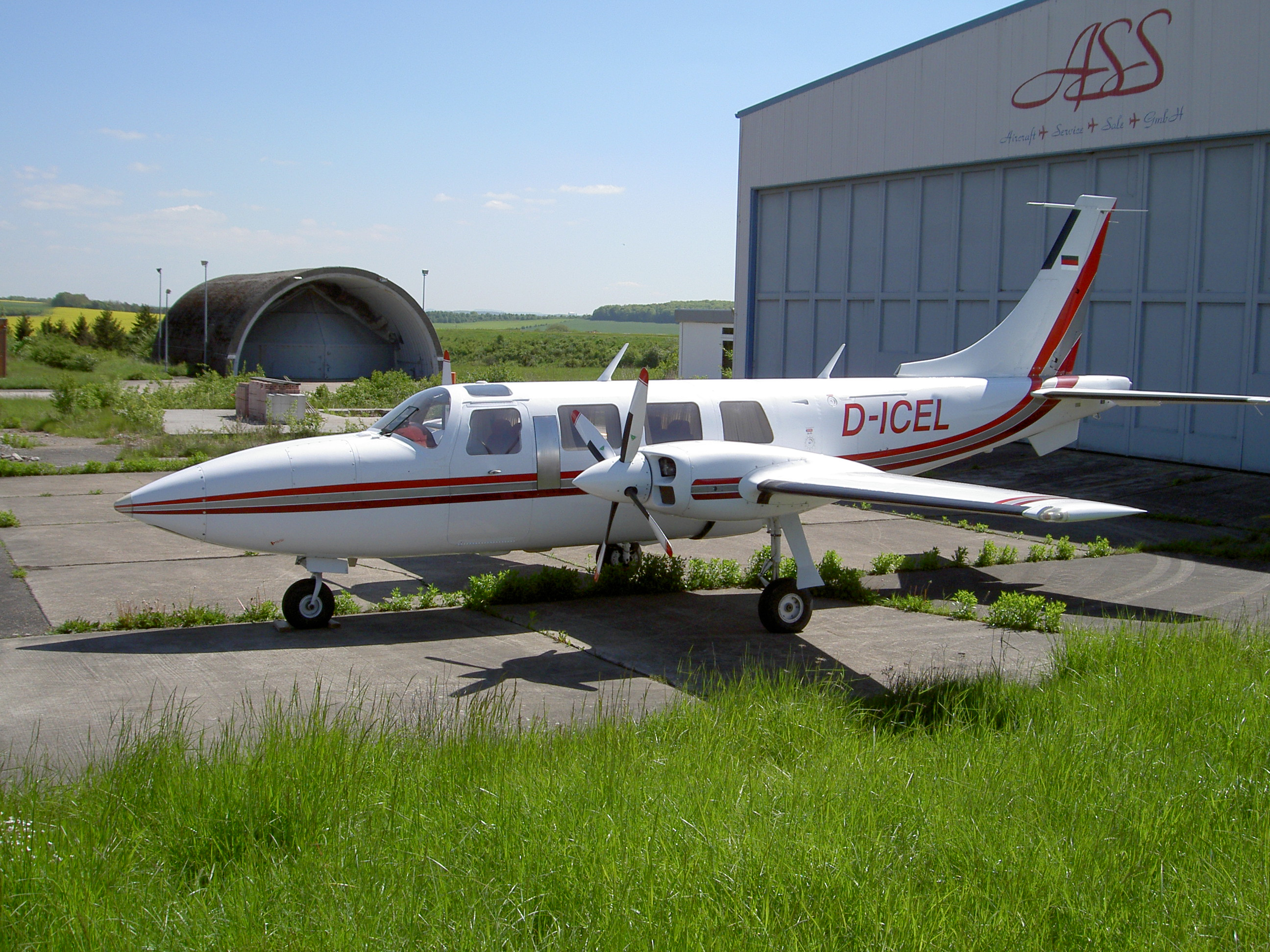
A Piper Aerostar general aviation aircraft at Zweibrücken Airport

| | Number of passengers |
|---|---|
| 2006 | 78,000 |
| 2007 | ▲288,000 |
| 2008 | ▲327,000 |
| 2009 | ▲338,000 |
| 2010 | ▼265,000 |
| 2011 | ▼224,000 |
| 2012 | ▲242,880 |
| 2013 | ▼220,740 |
Source: Zweibrücken Airport

== Ground transportation ==
Zweibrücken Airport is only accessible by road. It can be reached via motorway A8 (exit Contwig, Flughafen, Bitche (F)) which leads to Saarbrücken and Luxembourg and from France directly via federal highway L700. Additionally, the local bus route 226 connects the airport with Zweibrücken city centre including Zweibrücken station.

== Zweibrücken Circuit ==
Zweibrücken Air Base Circuit
- Touring Car Circuit (1996–1999)
- Location: Zweibrücken, Rhineland-Palatinate
- Opened: 9 August 1996; 29 years ago
- Closed: 23 May 1999; 27 years ago
- Major events: Super Tourenwagen Cup (1996–1999); German F3 (1997–1999); Pro Superbike (1997–1998); Porsche Carrera Cup Germany (1997, 1999)
- Website: https://www.edrz-airport.de/

Touring Car Circuit (1996–1999)
- Length: 2.800 km (1.740 mi)
- Turns: 7
- Race lap record: 1:01.438 ( (Austria) Robert Lechner, Dallara F399, 1999, F3)

Motorcycle Circuit (1998)
- Length: 2.900 km (1.802 mi)
- Turns: 8
- Race lap record: 1:09.333 ( (Germany) Jochen Schmid, Kawasaki Ninja ZX-7R, 1998, SBK)

Motorcycle Circuit (1997)
- Length: 4.350 km (2.703 mi)
- Turns: 15
- Race lap record: 1:26.855 ( (Spain) Gregorio Lavilla, Ducati 916 SBK, 1997, SBK)

From 1996 to 1999, the airport held various Super Tourenwagen Cup, German F3, VW Beetle Cup and Pro Superbike races but stopped hosting national championships due to financial reasons.

The track has hosted the Historisches Flugplatzrennen, a historic car track day event, as recently as September 3rd 2023.

=== Lap records ===
The fastest official race lap records at the Zweibrücken Air Base Circuit are listed as:

| Category | Time | Driver | Vehicle | Event | Date |
Touring Car Circuit: 2.800km (1996–1999)
| F3 | 1:01.438 | Robert Lechner | Dallara F399 | 1999 Zweibrücken German F3 round | 23 May 1999 |
| Super Touring | 1:03.361 | Emanuele Pirro | Audi A4 STW | 1996 Zweibrücken STW round | 11 August 1996 |
Motorcycle Circuit: 2.900km (1998)
| Superbike | 1:09.333 | Jochen Schmid | Kawasaki Ninja ZX-7R | 1998 Zweibrücken Pro-Superbike round | 26 April 1998 |
Motorcycle Circuit: 4.350km (1997)
| Superbike | 1:26.855 | Gregorio Lavilla | Ducati 916 SBK | 1997 Zweibrücken Pro-Superbike round | 20 April 1997 |

== See also ==
- Transport in Germany
- List of airports in Germany
- Flugplatz Mainz-Finthen, another German airport with a previously used racetrack
