= Nuremberg Airport =

International airport in Bavaria, Germany

Nuremberg Airport Albrecht Dürer Flughafen Nürnberg

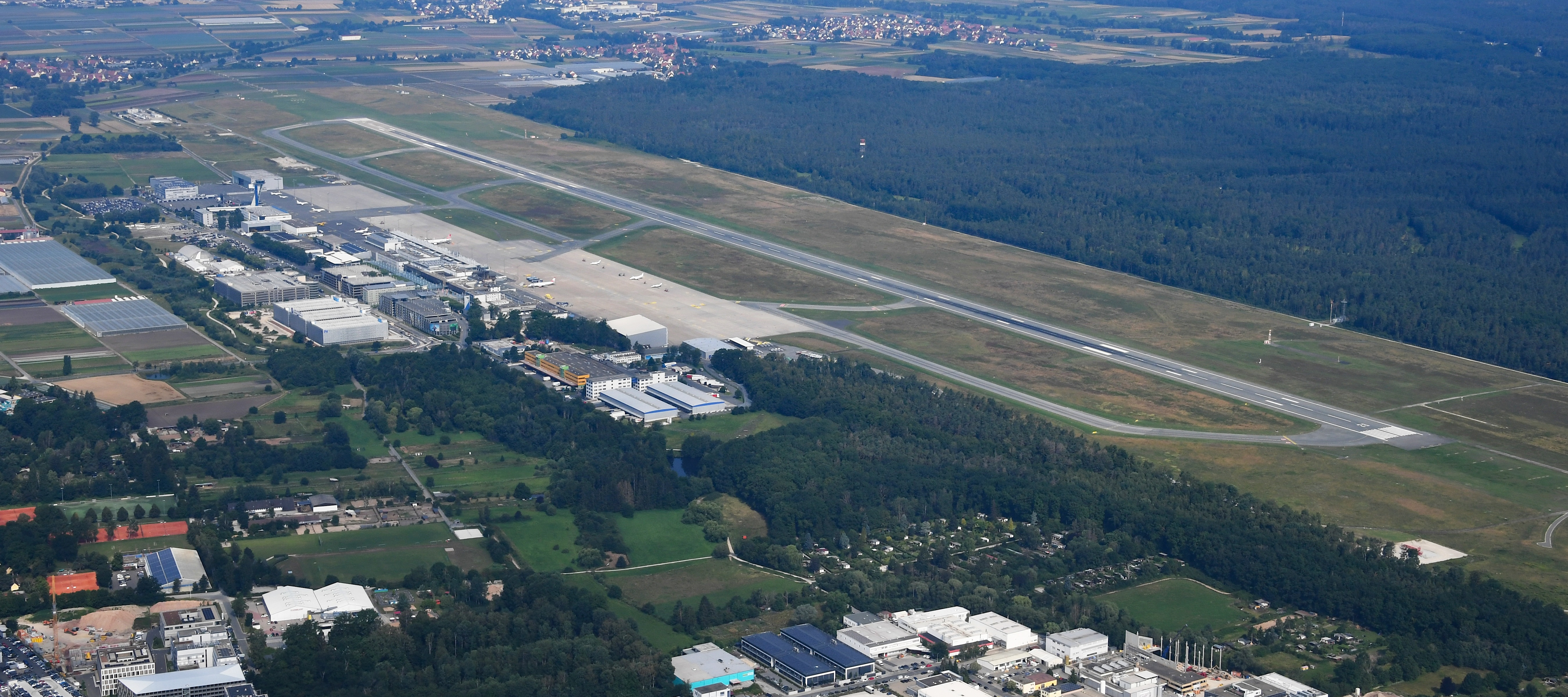
- IATA: NUE; ICAO: EDDN

Summary
- Airport type: Public
- Owner/Operator: Flughafen Nürnberg GmbH
- Serves: Nuremberg, Bavaria, Germany
- Opened: 6 April 1955; 71 years ago
- Operating base for: Corendon Airlines Europe; Marabu; Ryanair
- Time zone: CET (UTC+01:00)
  - Summer (DST): CEST (UTC+02:00)
- Elevation AMSL: 1,044 ft (318 m)
- Coordinates: 49°29′55″N 011°04′41″E
- Website: www.airport-nuernberg.de

Map
- Location of airport in Bavaria NUE (Germany)

Runways
Direction	Length		Surface
Direction	m	ft	Surface
10/28	2,700	8,858	Concrete/Asphalt

Statistics (2025)
- Passengers: 4,508,700 ▲+11.9%
- Aircraft movements: 52,919 ▲+8.8%
- Cargo (metric tons): 4,663 ▼-1.2%
- Sources: Statistics at ADV., AIP at German air traffic control.

Nuremberg Airport (German: Flughafen Nürnberg, marketed as Albrecht Dürer Airport Nürnberg after the painter Albrecht Dürer; (IATA: NUE, ICAO: EDDN)) is an international airport of the Franconian metropolitan area of Nuremberg and the second-busiest airport in Bavaria after Munich Airport. In 2025, the airport handled 4,508,700 passengers, the highest volume in its history, surpassing the previous record of 4,466,864 set in 2018. It was Germany's 9th busiest airport in 2025. It is located approximately 5 km (3.1 mi) north of Nuremberg's city centre and offers flights within Germany as well as to European metropolitan and leisure destinations, especially along the Mediterranean Sea, to the Canary Islands, Turkey and to North Africa. The airport is owned and operated by Flughafen Nürnberg GmbH, in turn owned 50% by the state of Bavaria and 50% by the city of Nuremberg.

== History ==
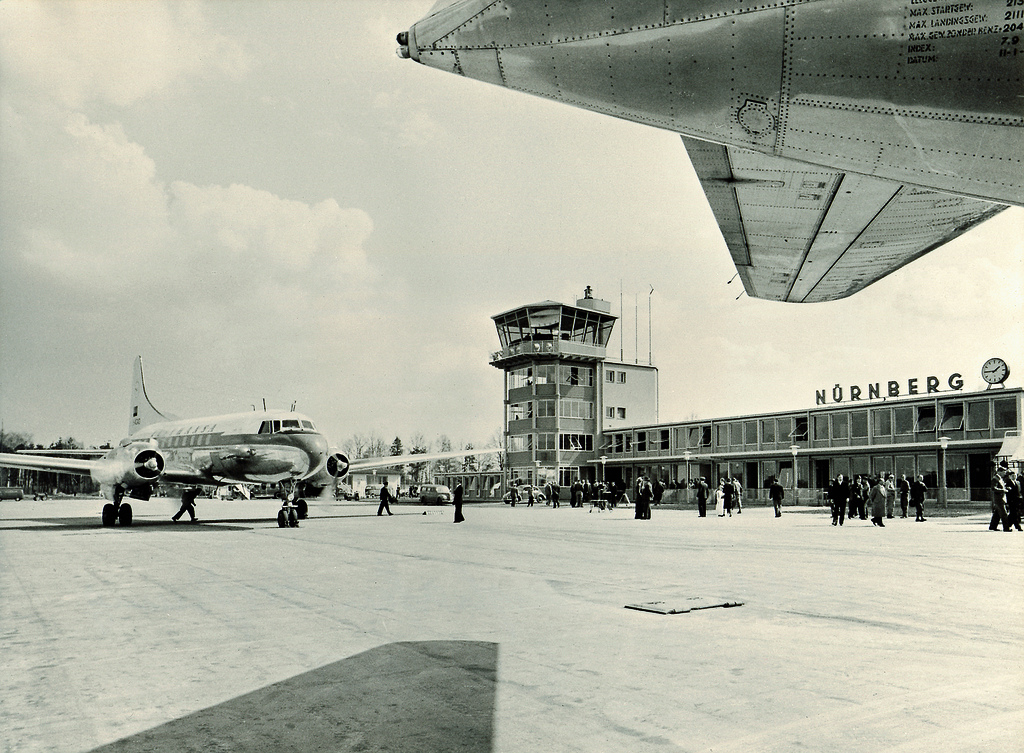
The airport on its inauguration day in April 1955.

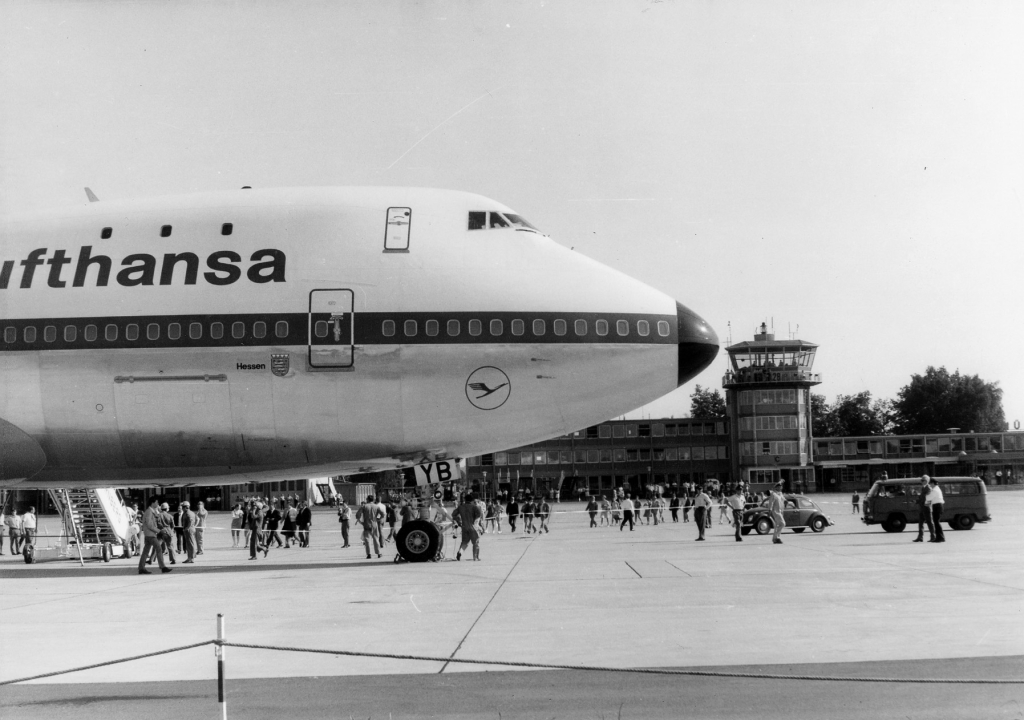
The first Lufthansa Boeing 747-100 visits Nuremberg in 1970. This aircraft crashed as Lufthansa Flight 540 in 1974.

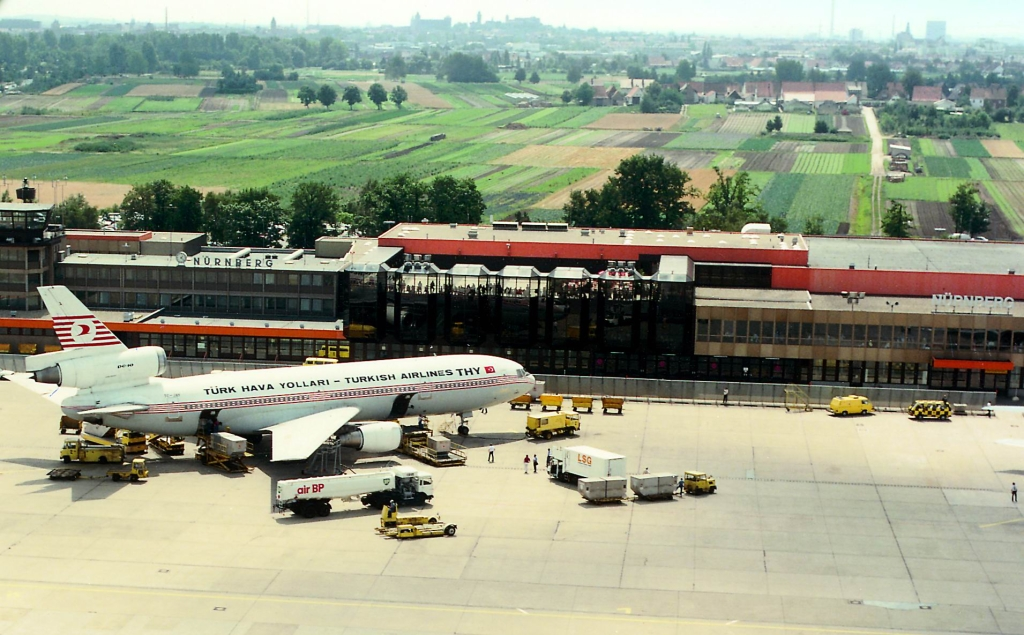
Aerial shot from the mid-1980s - a Turkish Airlines DC-10 is visible. Turkish Airlines has served NUE regularly since 1973.

=== Before the current airport ===
Prior to World War II, the Nuremberg area was served by a number of airfields in quick succession, all of which became inadequate in the face of the rapid development of aviation or fell victim to the same wars that had played a part in their construction. The first airfield in the area was built in 1915 by the Bavarian Army in the neighboring town of Fürth as a military air base. This Old Atzenhof Airport (Fürth Airfield) (49.4978°N 10.9553°E) remained in civilian use (the Versailles Treaty forbade Germany from maintaining an airforce but was silent on civil aviation) throughout the Weimar Republic until the new Nazi government opened the new Marienberg Airport (49.475833°N 11.094167°E) in Nuremberg. While the plans to build Marienberg Airport had existed before the 1933 power grab of the Nazis and it served supposedly civilian purposes, it was intended from its opening as a military airfield, which became openly admitted policy in 1935 with the establishment of the Luftwaffe, which maintained a base at Nuremberg-Marienberg airport. Largely destroyed in the war, the site of the former Marienberg airport, located a few km due south of the current airport, is today a public park. The former Atzenhof airfield was taken over by the US Army after the war and is today used as a golf course with some of the erstwhile airport buildings still extant.

==== Post-WWII ====
After World War II the US Armed Forces (Nuremberg being in the American Zone of Occupation) would use the main boulevard of the Nazi Party Rallying Grounds as a makeshift runway for their purposes, including the flights to and from the Nuremberg trials. However, even after Germans were allowed to partake in civil aviation again, that makeshift infrastructure was limited to use by the American military. Being thus left without a "proper" usable civilian airport — from 1950 to the completion of the new permanent airport passenger flights serving the area had to land at a private airfield (49.481667°N 10.953333°E) of a Fürth based company near the current endpoint of the U1 subway line, Fürth Hardhöhe station (A small plaque in the access tunnel to the subway station records that history.) The need to build an airport equipped for the demands of the rapidly growing aviation sector, in a country experiencing strong post-war economic growth, became pressing, and the young Federal Republic of Germany engaged in its first airport building project.

=== Early years at the current site ===
Nuremberg Airport was the first airport constructed in West Germany after World War II. It was inaugurated on 6 April 1955. Nuremberg Airport was in the American Zone of Occupation during German partition and to this day some US Army Bases in the vicinity (most notably U.S. Army Garrison Grafenwoehr) make use of the airport to fly in cargo and soldiers – the latter also on commercial flights.

In 1960, the number of passengers at Nuremberg Airport reached 100,000 for the first time. In 1961 the runway was extended from 1,900 to 2,300 metres (6,200 to 7,500 ft), and in 1968 the runway was extended to its present length of 2,700 metres (8,900 ft), allowing the then largest airliner in existence – the Boeing 747 – to use it. On 12 July 1970, a Boeing 747 landed at the airport for the first time and attracted 20,000 visitors. While a Boeing 747 used in passenger service at NUE is a rare sight, to this day freight flights using the largest serially produced civilian cargo plane take off and land at NUE with some regularity. In 1969 the then Munich Riem Airport shut down its main runway for maintenance for three weeks, which meant that most flights were redirected to Nuremberg Airport. This necessitated some upgrades to the existing infrastructure which cost some two million DM (equivalent to €3,918,006 in 2021).

The apron was enlarged in 1977 and in 1981 a new passenger terminal with an observation deck and a restaurant replaced the previous building. In December 1986, the one million passenger mark was passed for the first time.

The local entrepreneur and partial heir to the de:Rudolf Wöhrl SE, Hans Rudolf Wöhrl is associated with the airport in multiple roles, not least his involvement in the 1974 founding of the first private competition to Lufthansa on the German domestic market de:Nürnberger Flugdienst (NFD) which had a base of operations at Nuremberg Airport and ultimately wound up as part of Eurowings in 1992. Even after the end of his involvement with NFD, Wöhrl remained active in aviation and founded or took over multiple airlines as well as launching unsuccessful bids to take over struggling or bankrupt airlines like Air Berlin when it went bankrupt in 2017/2018.

=== The 1990s ===
In 1997/98, Air Berlin established a winter hub at the airport, making it the airline's second most important tourist interchange airport, after Palma de Mallorca.

The new control tower commenced operations in 1999 and the U-Bahn station was opened. The 2,388 m (7,835 ft) extension of the U-Bahn line U2 cost 95 million Deutsche Mark (equivalent to €67,228,608 in 2021) of which the airport paid 18.6 million – the rest was paid for by the state government of Bavaria and the federal government of Germany. Due to the extension to the airport opening on the same day as that to Ziegelstein, some press reports mistake the overall 180 million DM figure for that of the extension to the airport alone. While the city did not pay any of the cost of the stretch to the airport, it did contribute 15 million DM for the 85 million DM construction cost of the 945 m (3,100 ft) stretch Herrnhütte-Ziegelstein. According to press reports approximately 30 million passengers used the U-Bahn extension to the airport in its first 20 years of operation.

=== Early 21st century ===
In 2005 Nuremberg Airport celebrated its 50th anniversary with 45,000 visitors.

In April 2013, Air Berlin permanently shut down its winter seasonal hub in Nuremberg which had been maintained for several years.

In December 2014 the airport was named after Albrecht Dürer, who was born in Nuremberg. Subsequently, the metro station was adorned with reproductions of Dürer works.

In October 2016, Ryanair announced it would open a base at Nuremberg Airport consisting of two aircraft while four additional routes were inaugurated. In the same month, Air Berlin announced it would close its maintenance facilities at the airport due to cost cutting and restructuring measures. Shortly after, Germania announced it would open a new base at Nuremberg Airport consisting of one aircraft which served several new leisure routes. 2017 saw the bankruptcy of Air Berlin ending a trend of Air Berlin withdrawing service from the airport with the grounding of all Air Berlin flights. In January 2018, Eurowings announced it would establish a base at the airport consisting of one aircraft and four new routes as well as increased frequencies. After the demise of Germania in early 2019, TUI fly Deutschland announced it would base aircraft in Nuremberg to take over several leisure destinations. In late 2019 Ryanair announced the closure of their base in Nuremberg effective with the end of the winter schedule. The lack of available aircraft in light of the Boeing 737 Max groundings was cited as a reason at the time. Also in 2019 Corendon airlines announced a new base at NUE with over 50 weekly departures in the summer season. The company further expressed their commitment to the region with a special aircraft livery Boeing 737-800 honouring local football team 1. FC Nürnberg with whom they entered a partnership in 2020.

Nuremberg formerly had an extensive domestic network of which (as of 2024) only one direct route remains. Lufthansa decided not to resume its vital hub connection to Munich Airport in the wake of the pandemic, while its subsidiary Eurowings terminated all of its domestic links to Berlin (the since defunct Tegel Airport), Düsseldorf Airport, and Hamburg Airport. This leads to the circumstance that every domestic route from Nuremberg has been cancelled, with the sole exception of Lufthansas hub-feeder to Frankfurt Airport which is operated five times per day. While in 2019 there had been 450,000 domestic passengers to/from Nuremberg, by 2023 that market had – with the noted exception of the hub-feeder flights to Frankfurt – "all but disappeared" – despite overall passenger numbers in Nuremberg reaching 96% of the 2019 level in that year (better than the German average of roughly 80%).

While Air Berlin still operated one of its hubs at Nuremberg Airport, NUE was connected - at least seasonally - with fourteen German airports. These included, additionally to the ones mentioned above, the likes of Bremen Airport, Cologne Bonn Airport, Dortmund Airport, Dresden Airport, Erfurt Weimar Airport, Hanover Airport, Leipzig Halle Airport, Münster Osnabrück Airport, Paderborn Lippstadt Airport, Rostock Laage Airport and Sylt Airport.

Furthermore, Nuremberg Airport has also lost a lot of connectivity to European hubs with Brussels Airlines (to Brussels-Zaventem Airport), Finnair (to Helsinki Vantaa Airport), LOT Polish Airlines (to Warsaw Chopin Airport), and Scandinavian Airlines (to Copenhagen Airport) all not offering their respective services anymore. In 2023 Lufthansa Group also announced a further reduction in service to Nuremberg, cancelling the routes of their wholly owned subsidiaries Swiss and Austrian to their respective hubs Zurich Airport and Vienna Schwechat Airport, respectively. British Airways also ended its operations to Nuremberg in early 2024, previously offering a hub connection to London Heathrow.

=== COVID-19 and beyond ===
In June 2021, Lufthansa announced the termination of its route to Munich Airport, a flight covering around 170 km (110 mi) taking less than 30 minutes, in the wake of the COVID-19 pandemic and after facing longstanding criticism from an environmental standpoint. It has been replaced by a coach service which however lacks usage by customers. During the same time, flights via other hubs than Munich registered increased passenger numbers.

In August 2021, the airport announced plans to build another cargo center with 3,600 m^{2} (39,000 sq ft) of hangar space and 1,900 m^{2} (20,000 sq ft) of office space, with completion scheduled for 2023.

In 2021 Ryanair announced the re-establishment of their previously closed base at NUE in light of re-emerging demand after more and more destination countries had relaxed or removed COVID-19 restrictions. The 737-MAX groundings, cited as a reason for the abandonment of the base in 2019, had also ended by that point in time, increasing the number of planes Ryanair had available. In 2023 Ryanair opened a maintenance hangar for the aircraft based at NUE.

In 2023 Eurowings announced the return of a base in Nuremberg. Starting with the winter 2023/2024 schedule, one aircraft will be based in Nuremberg year-round with four destinations served in the winter and summer respectively.

The travel company TUI reported in early 2024 that based on their analysis of google reviews up to July 2023, Nuremberg Airport is the most popular international airport in Germany, receiving an average rating of 4.3 out of 5 stars.

== Facilities ==
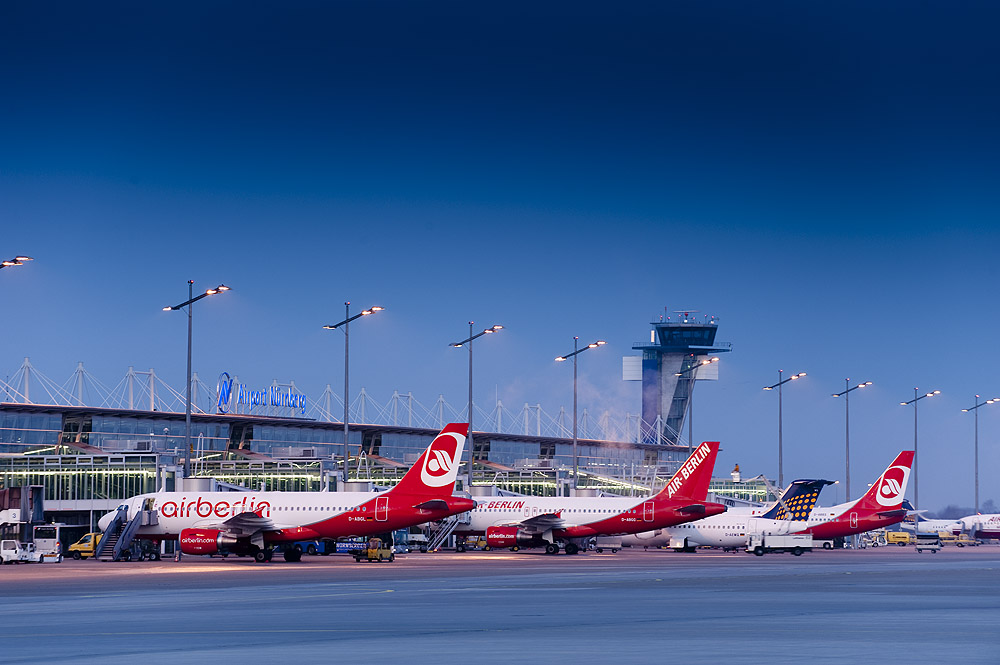
Apron overview with most planes visible of the since-defunct Air Berlin which formerly maintained a hub in Nuremberg.

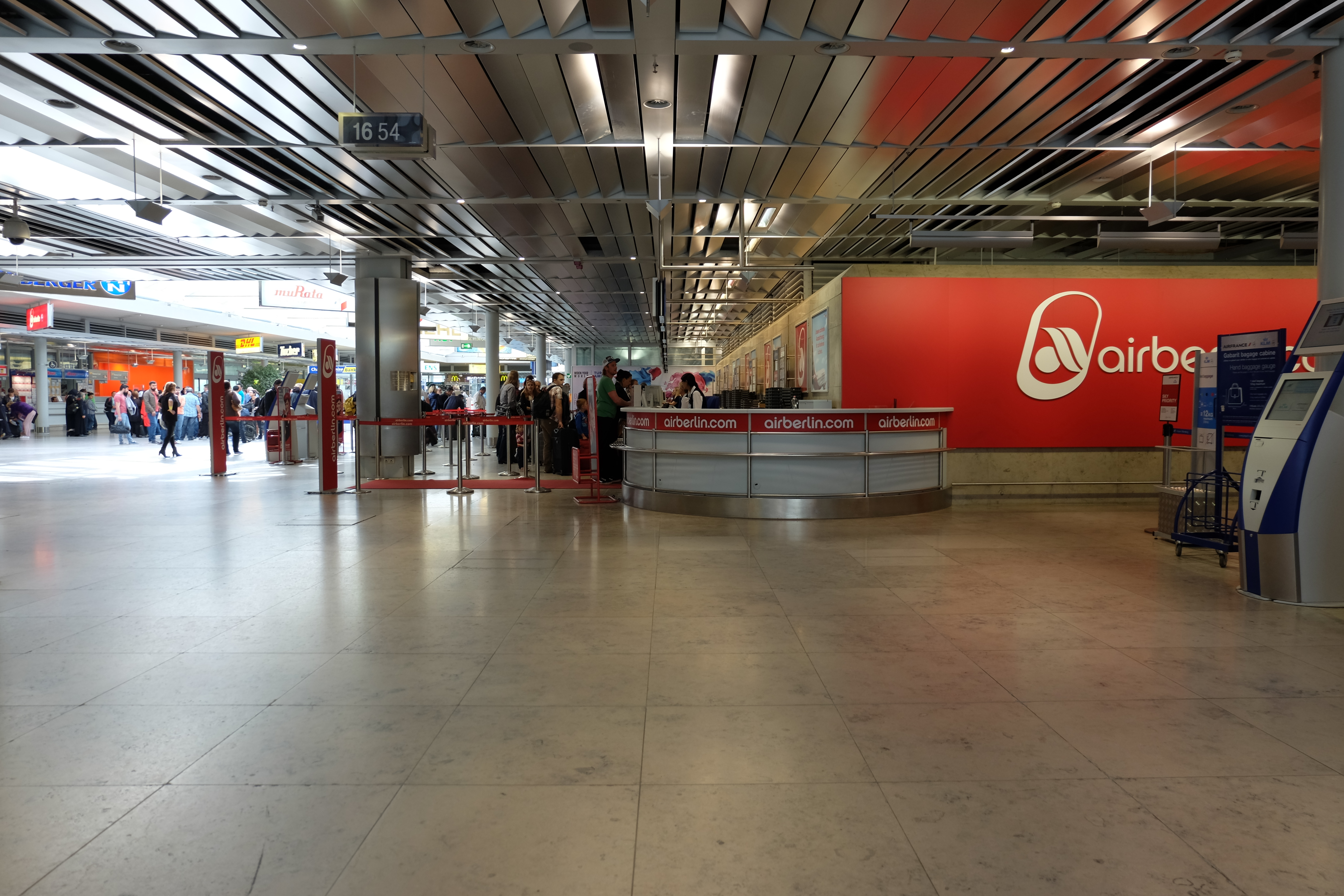
Check-in area

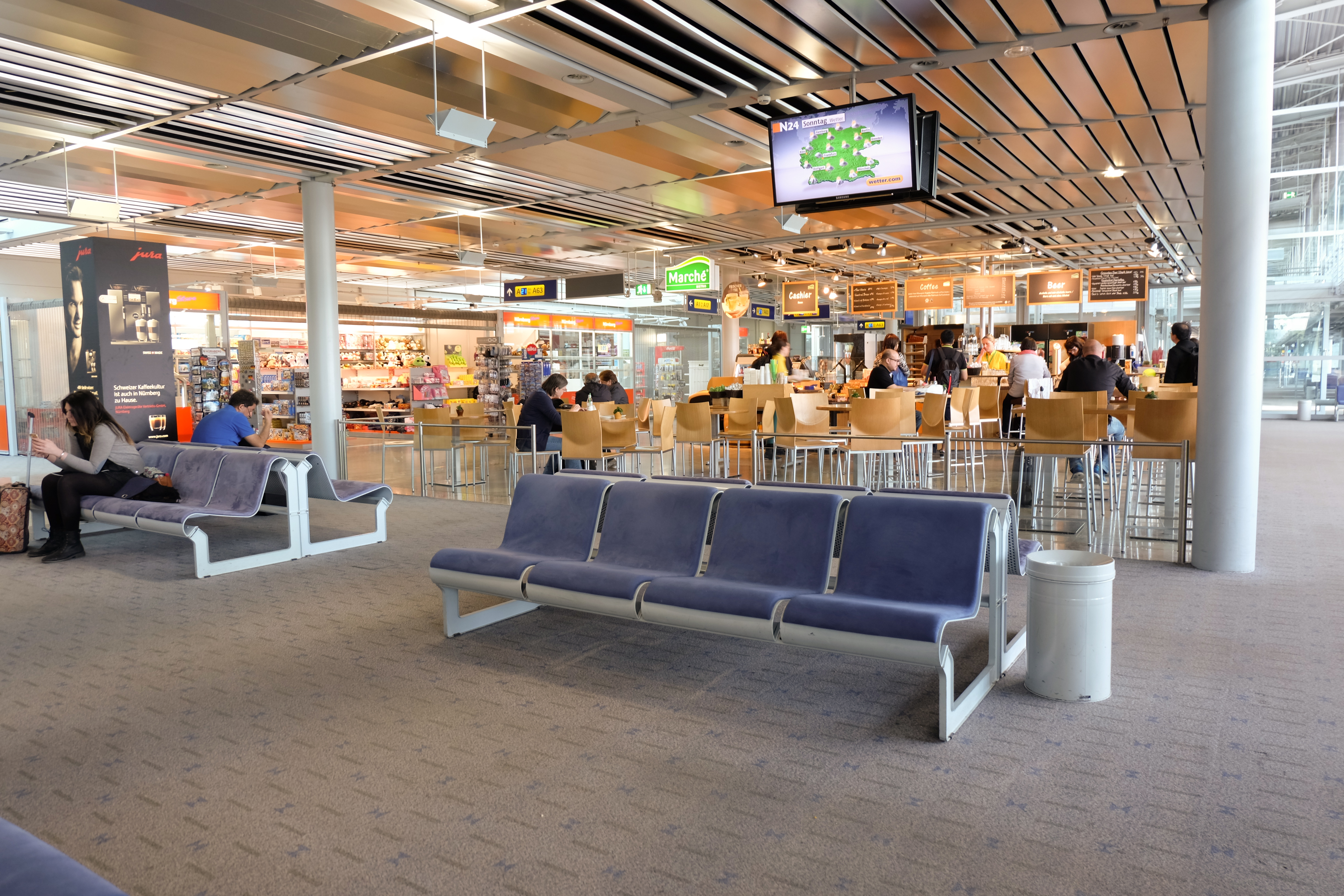
Departure area

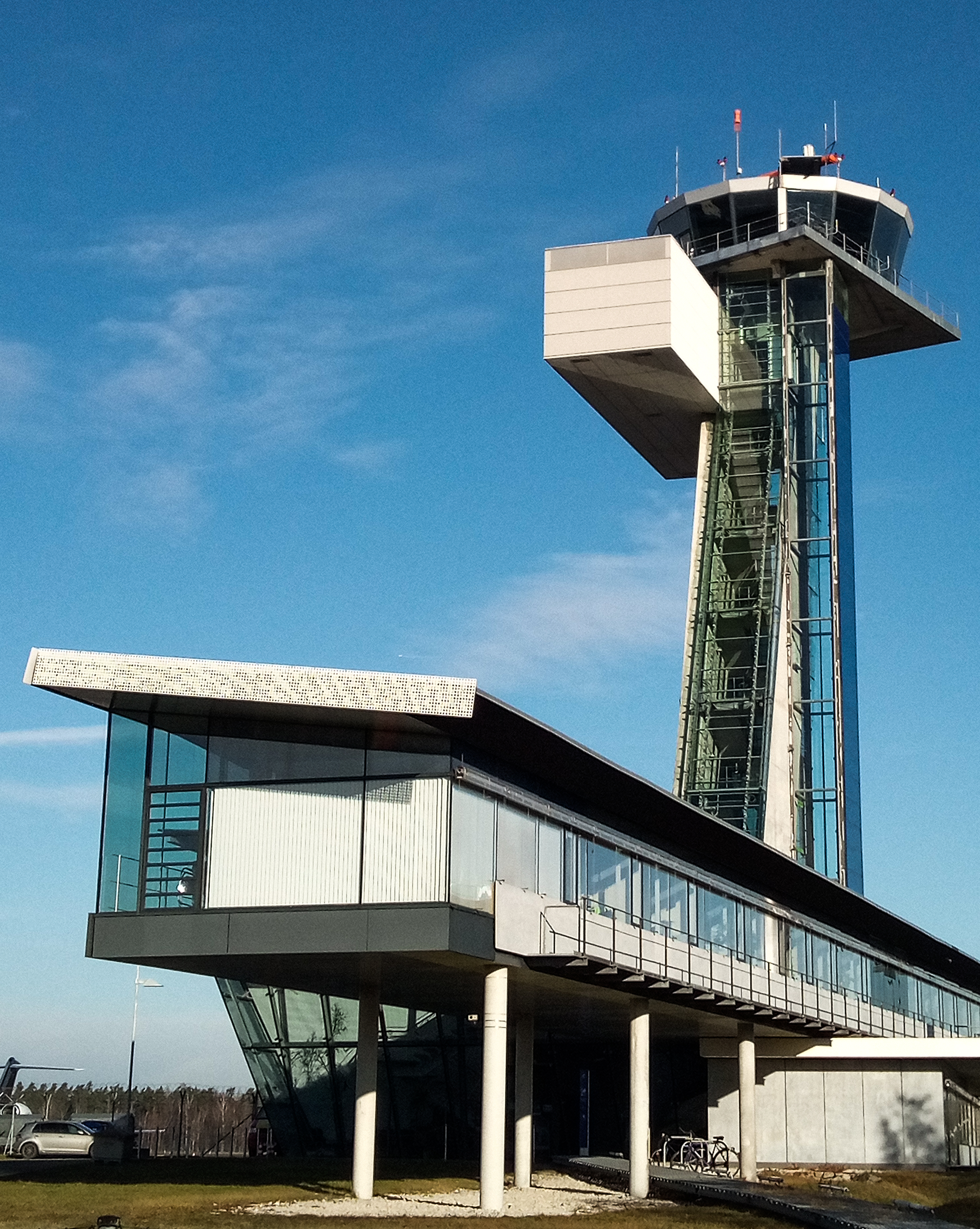
Control tower

=== Runway and apron ===
The runway 10/28 is 2,700 by 45 m (8,858 by 148 ft). Landing direction 28 is equipped with an ILS of Category III, while direction 10 has a Category I ILS. Takeoff and landing of all current aircraft, including widebody aircraft (e.g. Boeing 747) or cargo planes (e.g. Antonov An-124 Ruslan) are possible. However, Nuremberg Airport is not licensed for the Airbus A380.

The apron is 246,845 m^{2} (2,657,020 sq ft) in space and provides parking positions for 37 planes.

=== Terminal ===
The passenger terminal consists of two departure halls and one arrival hall which are all linked landside and airside. The check-in area features 40 desks. In December 2015 the new security control between departure halls 1 and 2 on the ground floor opened, replacing earlier facilities upstairs in hall 2 as machines had gotten too heavy to be placed on the upper floor.

The extension of departure hall 2 was inaugurated on 30 April 1992 and was originally dimensioned for 2.8 million passengers per year. Now there is room for 5 million passengers per year. Daylight dominates the transparent construction made of steel and glass drafted by Nuremberg architects Grabow and Hoffmann. The construction phase took three years and cost about 100 million Deutsche Mark (equivalent to €84,801,622 in 2021). The extension of the apron was included in the building costs as well as three modern jet bridges. Today, there are four finger docks available.

On 25 January 2007 the newest addition, the Transfer-Control-Terminal (TCT) was opened. It not only serves as a capacity extension but it also allows for new legislation concerning security measures: since EU Regulation 2320/2002 airports have to make sure that non-EU passengers are controlled before continuing their trip to countries of the European Union and don't get mixed up with passengers who have already been checked. There is a second security control for the stricter security procedures for flights to Israel (if and when they operate) inside the TCT.

The airport has an airport lounge branded "Dürer Lounge" which can be accessed with tickets of a high enough travel class and for status customers of the frequent flyer programs of various airlines or by paying for a single access ticket.

In the arrivals area, there are three luggage carousels which sometimes present a bottleneck during busy times when more than three flights land in quick succession or when unloading of one or more flights is delayed for whatever reason. Plans to expand the capacity of the baggage claim have thus far (as of September 2023) not come to fruition.

In late 2023, the airport announced a major overhaul of its shopping and gastronomical offer. The erstwhile 650 m^{2} (7,000 sq ft) airside shopping, duty free and food court area is to be expanded to 1,200 m^{2} (13,000 sq ft). A joint venture with Smartseller GmbH & Co KG (owned to equal parts by the airport and Smartseller) was set up to manage the transition and operate the new business.

=== Cargo center ===
In 1987, Cargo Center Nuremberg (CCN) was put into operation.

Nuremberg is also the economic and service metropolis of Franconia with approximately 150,000 companies and enterprises taking advantage of the locality of Nuremberg as a traffic junction of highways (A3, A9 & A73) and railroads. The region's export share of 42% is remarkably high and above German average. In addition, several headquarters of internationally operating companies are located in the region, for example Siemens, Adidas, Bosch, Puma and Faber-Castell.

Due to the positive trend, Cargo Center II (CCN II) was built in 2003. Today, almost 14,400 m^{2} (155,000 sq ft) of storage space and 6,550 m^{2} (70,500 sq ft) of office space are available at Nuremberg Airport. In 2025, 4,686 tonnes of air freight were flown to and from Nuremberg. A far larger volume – 86,359 tonnes in 2025 – is trucked, i.e. carried by road to other airports and only flown from there; the airport reports this figure separately.

=== Control tower ===
Deutsche Flugsicherung (DFS), which is in charge of air traffic control in Germany, moved into the 48-metre-high (157 ft) tower in November 1998. The control tower at Nuremberg Airport was designed by architect Günther Behnisch and has become the architectural landmark of the airport with its dynamic silhouette. It was built because the original control tower was only 18 meters (59 ft) high. The project cost approximately 30 million DM (equivalent to €21,442,385 in 2021).

=== Parking ===
There are about 10,400 car parking spaces at Nuremberg Airport. Apart from three multistorey car parks, there are various parking lots in close vicinity to the terminals. The newest facility is car park P4 with 3,600 parking spaces, which opened in 2021. Construction of P4 cost approximately €36 million and had begun in 2019. The old Parking facility P1 was torn down as it had reached the end of its useful life, leaving the number of parking garages constant at three, albeit with a major increase in capacity from roughly 8,000 to the current number. There are different parking tariffs to choose from, for example "BusinessParken" (business parking) or "UrlauberParken" (holiday parking).

=== Air rescue ===
Nuremberg Airport is also a center for Deutsche Rettungsflugwacht e.V (DRF) and HDM Flugservice air rescue services which operate a rescue helicopter and an intensive care helicopter, respectively. Furthermore, several ADAC air ambulances and Flight Ambulance International (FAI) are based in Nuremberg.

== Airlines and destinations ==
The following airlines offer regular scheduled and charter flights at Nuremberg Airport:

Airlines	Destinations
Aegean Airlines	Seasonal: Thessaloniki
Air Cairo	Hurghada, Marsa Alam
Air France	Paris–Charles de Gaulle
Air Serbia	Belgrade
AJet	Seasonal: Bodrum
British Airways	Seasonal: London–Heathrow
Corendon Airlines	Fuerteventura, Gran Canaria Hurghada, Seasonal: Adana/Mersin, Antalya Corfu, Heraklion, İzmir Kayseri, Kos, Marsa Alam Palma de Mallorca, Rhodes
easyJet	London–Gatwick (begins 19 November 2026); Seasonal: London–Luton (begins 23 November 2026), Manchester (begins 2 November 2026), Milan–Malpensa (begins 27 November 2026)
Eurowings	Palma de Mallorca
Freebird Airlines	Antalya
GP Aviation	Pristina
KLM	Amsterdam
Lufthansa	Frankfurt
Marabu	Fuerteventura, Gran Canaria, Hurghada, Tenerife–South; Seasonal: Corfu, Funchal, Heraklion, Kavala, Kos, Olbia, Palma de Mallorca, Rhodes
Mavi Gök Airlines	Seasonal: Antalya
Nesma Airlines	Hurghada
Pegasus Airlines	Istanbul–Sabiha Gökçen; Seasonal: Antalya, İzmir
Ryanair	Alicante, Bari, Budapest, Faro, London–Stansted, Málaga, Palermo, Palma de Mallorca, Porto, Rabat, Seville, Sofia, Tenerife–South, Valencia, Vilnius; Seasonal: Agadir (begins 26 October 2026), Cagliari, Chania, Corfu, Girona, Naples, Preveza/Lefkada, Thessaloniki, Zadar
SkyUp Airlines	Chișinău (begins 28 May 2027)
Sun Express	Antalya, İzmir
Turkish Airlines	Istanbul
Vueling	Barcelona
Wizz Air	Brașov, Bucharest–Otopeni, Chișinău, Cluj-Napoca, Sibiu, Skopje, Târgu Mureș (begins 20 December 2026), Timișoara, Tirana, Varna

== Statistics ==
Airport Nuremberg – Traffic by calendar year since 1991
Year	Passengers (Note: Total Traffic (incl. Transit))	Aircraft operations (Note: Total Traffic (incl. non-commercial))	Cargo tonnage (Note: Cargo (incl. Transit))
2025	4,508,700	52,919	4,663
2024	4,027,814	48,627	4,720
2023	3,923,254	50,313	4,465
2022	3,272,138	48,216	5,583
2021	1,063,153	33,094	7,943
2020	916,963	30,056	6,888
2019	4,111,689	61,456	7,181
2018	4,466,864	66,074	8,337
2017	4,186,961	64,111	8,124
2016	3,484,825	59,602	7,372
2015	3,381,681	60,117	7,859
2014	3,257,348	61,257	8,806
2013	3,309,629	62,639	9,959
2012	3,597,136	64,375	9,974
2011	3,962,617	67,717	10,445
2010	4,068,799	70,779	9,683
2009	3,965,743	71,217	10,611
2008	4,269,606	76,767	12,992
2007	4,238,275	81,025	15,084
2006	3,961,458	78,104	14,359
2005	3,843,710	76,119	12,034
2004	3,648,580	71,818	13,342
2003	3,290,299	73,241	12,996
2002	3,208,287	77,857	16,177
2001	3,195,818	83,807	18,227
2000	3,149,881	86,704	21,304
1999	2,779,412	83,728	19,344
1998	2,518,028	84,041	35,501
1997	2,418,338	82,984	54,191
1996	2,225,005	78,836	45,364
1995	2,250,694	79,424	40,234
1994	1,880,151	75,162	29,171
1993	1,821,027	74,485	18,552
1992	1,667,810	77,363	10,911
1991	1,427,230	75,327	10,588

=== Busiest routes ===
In 2023 the busiest routes were Antalya (505,700 passengers), Palma de Mallorca (430,000 passengers), Istanbul (225,400 passengers) Frankfurt (206,800 passengers) and Amsterdam (168,000 passengers).

== Ground transportation ==
=== Metro ===
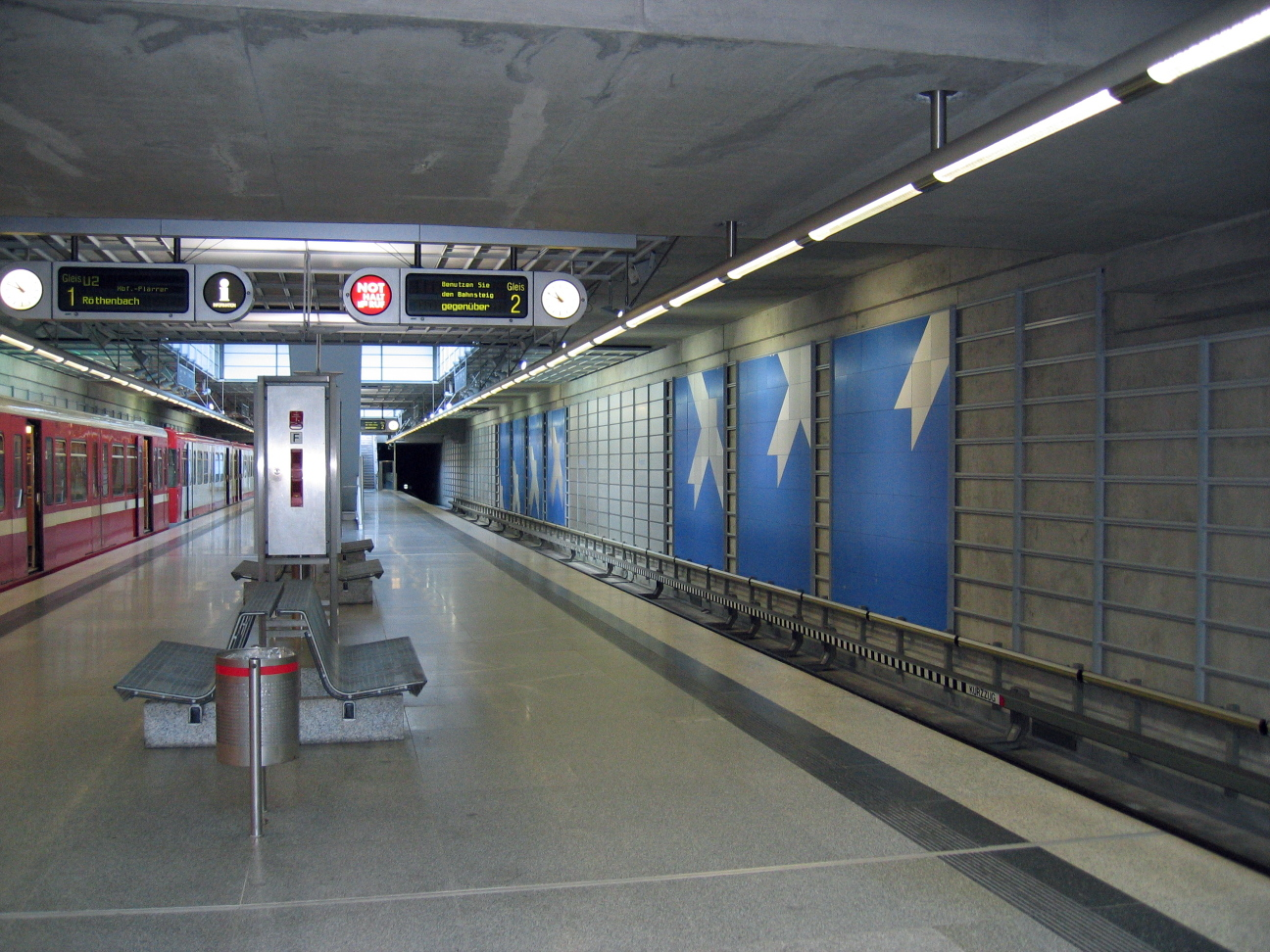
The airport's U-Bahn station - the train is waiting at the southern end of the platform, which is usually not used for passenger service

The U-Bahn (Metro) line U2 serves the airport at the Flughafen station. Trains connect the airport with the centre of the city every 10 minutes. The ride to the Hauptbahnhof (Central Railway Station) and the nearby Altstadt (historic old town) only takes 13 minutes. Nuremberg Airport is the only airport in Germany to be served by U-Bahn rather than S-Bahn, Tramway or Deutsche Bahn.

=== Car ===
Nuremberg Airport is located 5 km (3.1 mi) north of the city centre. It is accessible via nearby Autobahn A 3, which connects to Autobahn A 9 as well as Motorways A 73 and A 6. Longstanding plans for a more direct access from A3 (which runs north of the runway) were abandoned by all relevant local political factions in the run-up to the 2020 local elections. Bundesstraße 4 runs just to the West of the runway and is connected to the airport by local roads. Access for private automobiles is via Marienbergstraße and Flughafenstraße whereas public transit buses can use a slightly more direct route (see below).

=== Bus ===
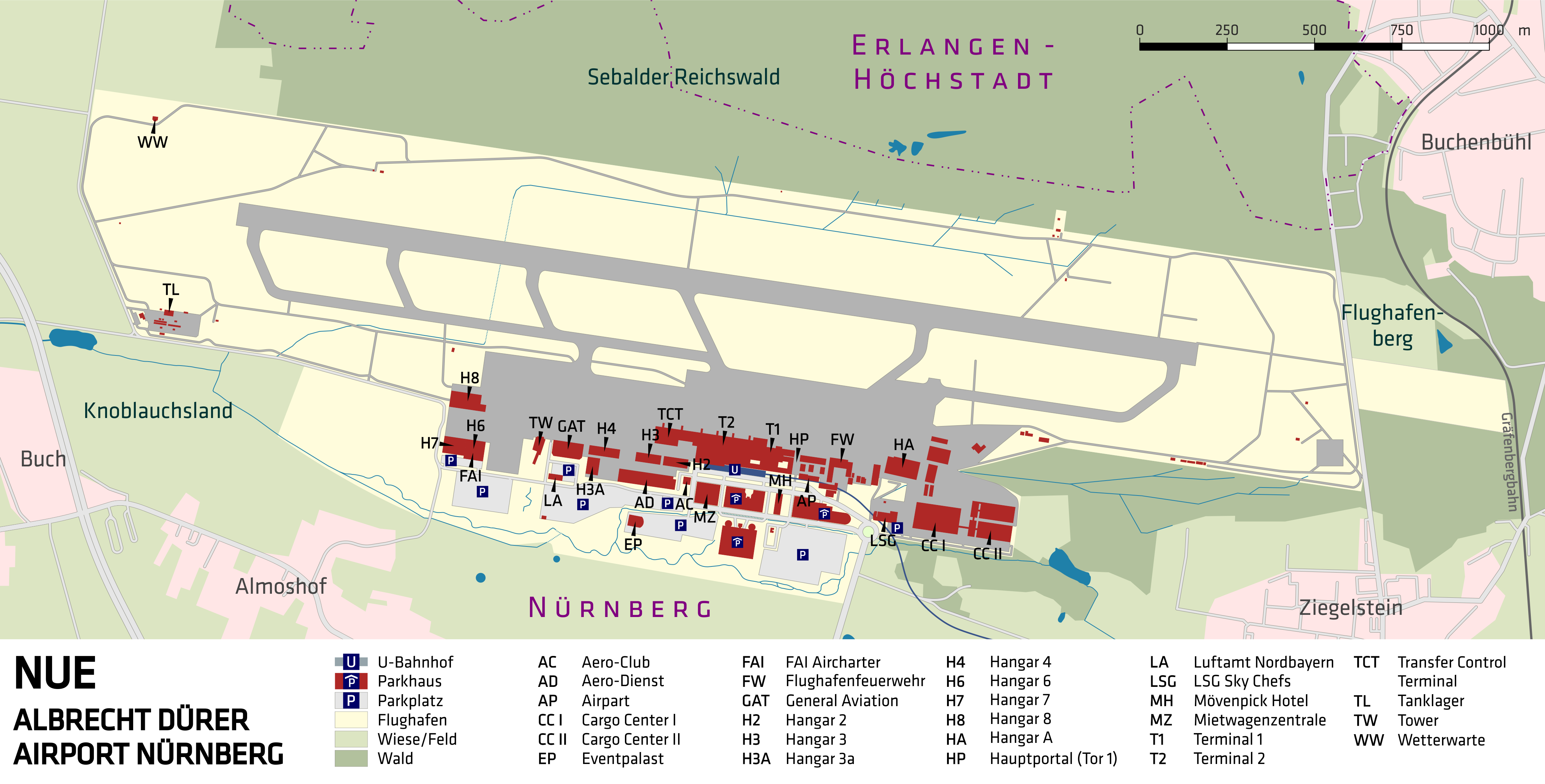
Map of the Airport and surrounding areas; labels in German

==== Public transit ====
Bus number 30 connects the airport with bus and Tram stop "am Wegfeld" before continuing to Erlangen. Since December 2015 new bus line 33 was installed, allowing passengers from Nuremberg's west-neighbouring city Fürth getting to the airport quicker without taking a detour via Nuremberg Central Station. Since the extension of Tram Line 4 from Thon to am Wegfeld, Bus line 30 which formerly terminated in Thon has been rerouted to the airport, thus offering a direct connection to downtown Erlangen from the airport for the first time. The bus takes a route through local residential areas which predate the airport and makes use of streets which are otherwise closed to motorized traffic, including a short stretch through the airport parking area. During much of the day lines 30 and 33 overlap between "am Wegfeld" and the airport for a ten-minute headway.

==== Other buses ====
Lufthansa also offers a bus service from Nuremberg to Munich. The bus route replaces a former flight, that was withdrawn during the pandemic and not reinstated after restrictions were lifted in part due to criticism by environmentalist groups. The Lufthansa Express Bus leaves from Parking space P2.

=== Walking or cycling ===
Because of the airport's close-in location and its direct connections to local streets, it is also possible to walk or ride a bicycle from nearby residential areas up to the terminal. Consequently, there is also bicycle parking in front of the terminal which is used by both employees and passengers.

== Environment ==
In addition to developing strategies to reduce noise pollution the department also implements regular measurements of air pollutants and soil analyses. In 2003, a biomonitoring campaign with honey bees was launched at the airport.

=== Chemical pollution residues from past operations ===
The water collected on the 70 hectares (170 acres) of sealed or covered areas is being filtered and analyzed before it gets fed into receiving water courses, to prevent pollution due to oils or fuels. If the analyzed TOC value is above the threshold level, the water is discharged into the sewerage. Over the years, surface and aircraft de-icing fluids have been replaced by substances with higher biodegradability.

=== Biomonitoring ===
The airport has been keeping bees and analysing their honey and pollen for pollutants as a form of biomonitoring since 2003. The samples are tested for traffic-related organic air pollutants and for heavy metals; according to the airport, all findings have remained below the statutory limits since the project began.

=== Renewable energy and electrification ===
In 2019, the airport replaced its baggage tug fleets with all electric vehicles

The airport uses solar panels on some rooftops and woodchips provided by local agricultural producers to provide 100% renewable electricity.

=== Noise ===
Unlike many other airports in Germany, Nuremberg Airport is licensed for 24/7 operations and has a lot of passenger flights at night especially during the summer high season. This is controversial on noise abatement grounds, but the airport argues that slots at busy destination airports like Antalya Airport are only available for nighttime departures/arrivals to/from Nuremberg. In addition to local citizens, Lord Mayor Florian Janik (SPD) whose city of Erlangen partially sits in the flightpath has formally lodged a complaint against night-time operations at the airport. While cargo, general aviation and military flights also operate at night during winter months, scheduled passenger flights at night are less common during that time of year. As a side-effect of being one of the closest airports with the license and capabilities to receive arriving flights during the nighttime curfew of Munich or Frankfurt Airport (the busiest airports in Germany and important Lufthansa hubs), it receives rerouted flights originally scheduled to land at those airports from time to time.

== Expansion plans ==
=== Airport Business Center ===
In 2009, it was decided that a new hotel with conference rooms and offices will be built at the airport roundabout. ConTech GmbH and the architect's office Christ, both from Nuremberg, will realize the project with investor ZBI. In 2011 the plans were put on hold until the motorway connection is completed.

=== Motorway access ===
Direct access to motorway A3 has been planned for several years. A direct route to the airport with a tunnel under the runway to reduce traffic through city district Ziegelstein is favored and spatial planning has already been completed. However, further planning has been delayed as environmental organization Bund Naturschutz and local citizens group Nein zur Flughafen-Nordanbindung! ("No to a northern airport [road] link!") are vehemently against the plans. While the decision to construct motorway access is ultimately taken at the federal level, ahead of the 2020 mayoral elections candidates of CSU, SPD and Greens have all voiced their opposition to the plans of constructing such a road. As ultimately the candidate of the CSU, de:Marcus König, won the election, the plans appear to be shelved for at least the 2020-2026 mayoral term.

=== Cargo Centre Nuremberg 3 (CCN3) ===
In 2021, a letter of intent was signed for another cargo centre (CCN3). The CCN3 will add around 3,600 square metres (39,000 sq ft) of warehouse space and around 1,900 square metres (20,000 sq ft) of office space to the range of services.

== Accidents and incidents ==
- On 6 May 1974, a Douglas DC-6A freighter of the Icelandic operator Fragtflug (registration TF-OAE), arriving from Nice, struck trees and crashed inverted while on an ILS approach to runway 28, about 4 km (2.5 mi) east of Nuremberg. All three crew members, the only people on board, were killed. Airframe icing was the probable cause; the captain was also found to have had a blood alcohol concentration of between 121 and 250 mg per 100 ml.
- On 8 January 2010, an Air Berlin Boeing 737-800 skidded off the runway shortly before takeoff on a flight to Düsseldorf, causing the airport to close for a few hours.

== See also ==
- List of airports in Germany
- Transport in Germany
