= 2020 Bavarian local elections =

2020 election in Bavaria

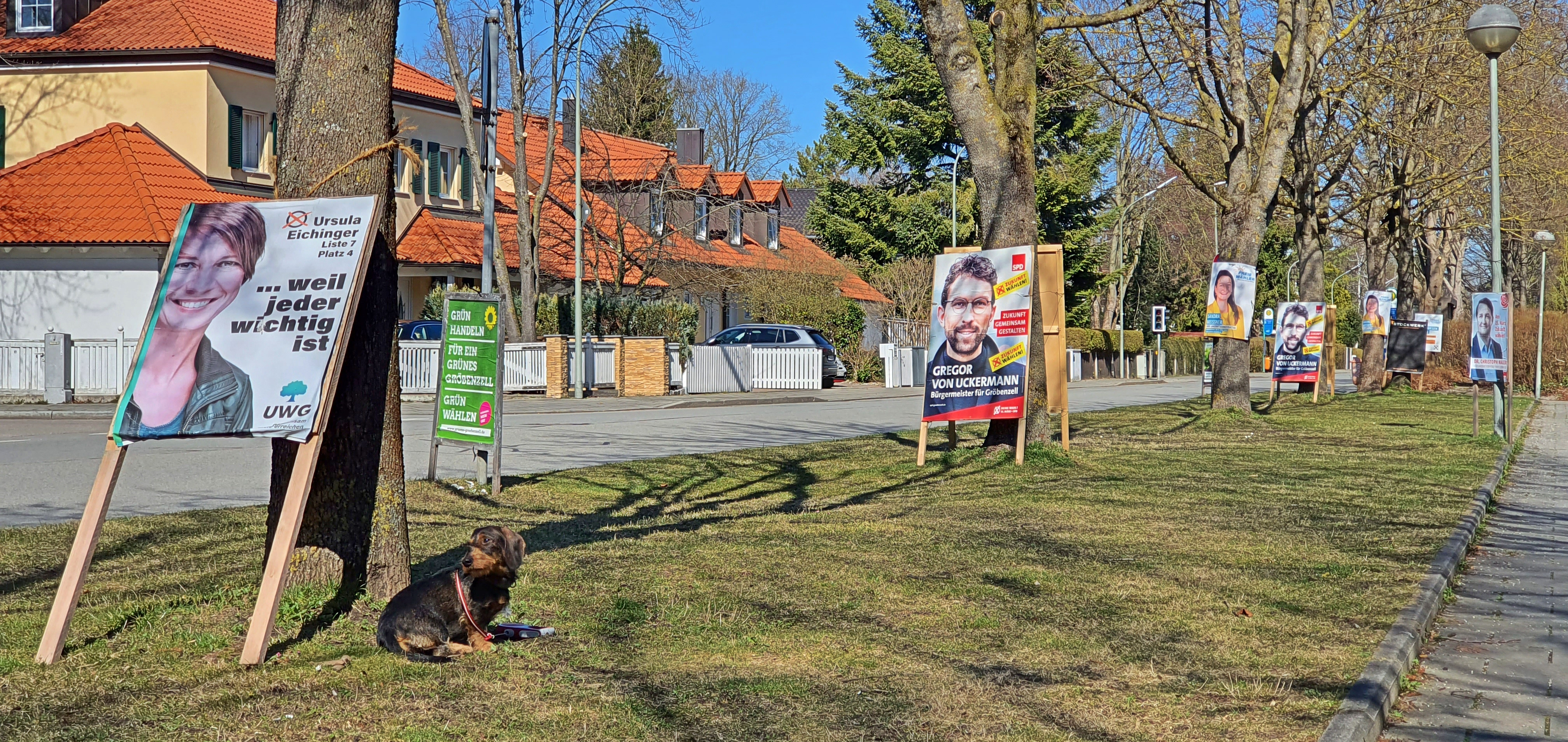
Election advertising in the municipality of Gröbenzell (Upper Bavaria)

The 2020 Bavarian local elections took place on March 15, 2020, in all municipalities of the Free State of Bavaria as elections of the municipal and district assemblies as well as in the majority of municipalities and districts as elections of the (Lord)Mayors and district administrators. In the bodies where none of the candidates achieved more than 50%, a runoff between the two leading candidates was held again on March 29. The terms of office of the elected began on May 1, 2020.

In total, around 39,500 mandates were to be filled in the 71 districts, 25 independent cities and over 2,000 municipalities of Bavaria. The municipal representatives are elected every six years in general elections according to the Bavarian municipal election law in a combination of cumulating and panachage, with each voter generally having as many votes as there are municipal council and district council seats to be allocated.

Due to the COVID-19 pandemic, precautionary measures were taken at the local elections, which in the opinion of some election helpers were insufficient. It was also criticized that the elections were held at all. The Christian Social Union achieved their worst ever results in the history of the state, and the Social Democratic Party also suffered heavy losses. The Greens gained many votes and became the second biggest party, but far behind what was expected.

== Interest in the election ==
Interest in the Bavarian local election was extraordinarily high. 79% of the surveyed citizens indicated a strong or even very strong interest in a poll, 9% more compared to the 2014 election. Voter turnout increased to 58.8%.

== Changes in electoral law ==
In the 2020 local election, the count was carried out for the first time using the Sainte-Laguë method, which replaced the Hare/Niemeyer method in force since 2013. Here, the votes of the parties are divided by a certain number, the divisor, which must be newly determined for each election. The number of mandates for each party is determined from the rounded results. It is considered the counting method in which the least disadvantages occur for large as well as small parties. The CSU had advocated for counting according to the D'Hondt method, which disadvantages small parties.

The new Bavarian municipal electoral law also abolished list connections. In return, multiple lists from individual parties may be registered for election under certain conditions.

== COVID-19 and postal voting ==
Postal voting was also, but not solely, used more intensively on March 15, 2020, due to the COVID-19 pandemic in Bavaria.

On March 29, 2020, the necessary runoffs were conducted as pure postal votes following a change in the law. The documents were automatically sent to the eligible voters.

Against this background, Landtag Vice-President Markus Rinderspacher (SPD) proposed to proceed in the same way for future Landtag and Bundestag elections; polling stations should be abolished. In view of increasing mobility, this is a "contemporary, citizen-friendly and sensible voting option."

The counting of votes took longer than usual due to the COVID-19 pandemic, as many election helpers reported sick at short notice or stayed at home as a precaution. In Munich, Lord Mayor Dieter Reiter therefore obliged tenured teachers to help with the counting.

== Results ==
=== City councils of independent cities and district councils of districts ===
City councils
City	CSU	Grüne	SPD	FW	AfD	ÖDP	FDP	Linke	Others
Munich	24.7	29.1	22.0	2.5	3.9	4.0	3.5	3.3	7.1
Nuremberg	31.3	20.0	25.7	2.8	5.7	2.3	2.1	3.9	6.1
Augsburg	32.3	23.4	14.3	4.5	6.6	2.2	2.3	3.7	10.8
Regensburg	25.7	21.7	12.2	5.9	4.5	7.2	3.3	3.0	16.6
Ingolstadt	26.8	15.2	17.5	7.9	7.6	4.1	3.5	4.4	12.9
Würzburg	29.3	32.5	9.2	–	3.8	3.9	3.5	5.3	12.6
Fürth	18.7	20.0	42.7	4.1	5.9	–	2.5	6.1	–
Erlangen	30.2	22.4	21.7	–	3.7	5.7	4.0	3.8	8.5
Bamberg	22.8	27.0	16.2	3.4	4.8	2.2	2.8	3.6	17.2
Bayreuth	24.1	18.0	17.7	–	3.9	–	5.3	1.7	29.3
Aschaffenburg	30.4	20.9	27.1	–	5.4	4.6	5.1	–	6.6
Landshut	22.0	25.4	8.0	10.8	5.8	4.7	6.5	2.6	14.3
Kempten	26.5	19.2	9.2	21.8	6.8	4.3	4.7	1.0	6.6
Rosenheim	36.4	25.0	12.4	10.6	6.2	2.2	2.7	3.2	1.2
Schweinfurt	38.2	14.2	17.6	7.2	8.4	3.2	2.6	6.0	2.8

The CSU remained by far the strongest party, but had to accept significant losses and achieved one of the worst results in state history with just over 34 percent. The Greens once again improved on their record result already achieved in 2014 and became the second strongest force in the Free State with over 17%. In contrast, the SPD experienced another slump after its negative record in 2014 and ended up with just under 14 percent. Strong changes were recorded in the results for joint electoral proposals and voter groups. The vast majority (7.9%) of the joint electoral proposals were lists put forward by the Free Voters and previously independently running Free Voter communities and other voter groups. In the calculation, the difference to 2014 is therefore rather small. The AfD ran in most districts and independent cities in 2020 and was thus able to improve its result. Among the other parties, The Left is subsumed in the bar chart, among others, which ran for more bodies and achieved a result of 1.5%. Losses were suffered by the Bavaria Party, the Pirate Party, which only ran independently in Hof, and The Republicans, who still won two mandates. Newly running parties include Die PARTEI, Volt and the V-Partei³, which entered the city councils or district councils for which they ran in isolated cases. The Franks achieved one seat in Hof. In Erlangen and Kempten, so-called Klimaliste ran for the first time, with this movement originating in Erlangen. In both cities, they entered the city council with two mandates each.

=== Mayors and district administrators ===
Mayors
City	Elected mayor	Party	Result	
City	Elected mayor	Party	1st round	2nd round
Munich	Dieter Reiter	SPD	47.9%	71.7%
Nuremberg	Marcus König	CSU	36.5%	52.2%
Augsburg	Eva Weber	CSU	43.1%	62.3%
Regensburg	Gertrud Maltz-Schwarzfischer	SPD	22.2%	50.8%
Ingolstadt	Christian Scharpf	SPD	33.7%	59.3%
Würzburg	Christian Schuchardt	CSU	52.0%	
Fürth	Thomas Jung	SPD	73.0%	
Erlangen	Florian Janik	SPD	39.2%	54.5%
Bamberg	Andreas Starke	SPD	35.9%	59.3%
Bayreuth	Thomas Ebersberger	CSU	26.0%	52.6%
Aschaffenburg	Jürgen Herzing	SPD	47.9%	66.6%
Landshut	Alexander Putz	FDP	45.5%	70.4%
Kempten	Thomas Kiechle	CSU	54.3%	
Rosenheim	Andreas März	CSU	45.6%	61.5%
Schweinfurt	Sebastian Remelé	CSU	58.4%	

=== Chief administrative (Landrat) ===
Mayors
City	Elected mayor		Party	Runoff
Aichach-Friedberg		Klaus Metzger	CSU	—
Altötting		Erwin Schneider	CSU	—
Amberg-Sulzbach		Richard Reisinger	CSU	—
Ansbach		Jürgen Ludwig	CSU	yes
Aschaffenburg		Alexander Legler	CSU	—
Augsburg		Martin Sailer	CSU	—
Bad Kissingen		Thomas Bold	CSU	—
Bad Tölz-Wolfratshausen		Josef Niedermaier	Free Voters	yes
Bamberg		Johann Kalb	CSU	yes
Bayreuth		Florian Wiedemann	FWG	yes
Berchtesgadener Land		Bernhard Kern	CSU	yes
Cham		Franz Löffler	CSU	—
Coburg		—	—	—
Dachau		Stefan Löwl	CSU	—
Deggendorf		Christian Bernreiter	CSU	—
Dillingen an der Donau		—	—	—
Dingolfing-Landau		Werner Bumeder	CSU/JBL	—
Donau-Ries		Stefan Rößle	CSU/AL/JB	—
Ebersberg		Robert Niedergesäß	CSU	—
Eichstätt		Alexander Anetsberger	CSU	yes
Erding		Martin Bayerstorfer	CSU	yes
Erlangen-Höchstadt		Alexander Tritthart	CSU	—
Forchheim		Hermann Ulm	CSU	—
Freising		Helmut Petz	Free Voters	yes
Freyung-Grafenau		Sebastian Gruber	CSU	—
Fürstenfeldbruck		Thomas Karmasin	CSU	—
Fürth		Matthias Dießl	CSU	—
Garmisch-Partenkirchen		Anton Speer	Free Voters	—
Günzburg		Hans Reichhart	CSU/Free Voters/JU	—
Haßberge		Wilhelm Schneider	CSU	—
Hof		Oliver Bär	CSU	—
Kelheim		Martin Neumeyer	CSU	—
Kitzingen		Tamara Bischof	Free Voters	—
Kronach	—	—	—	—
Kulmbach		Klaus Peter Söllner	Free Voters /WGK/CSU/FDP	—
Landsberg am Lech		Thomas Eichinger	CSU	—
Landshut		Peter Dreier	Free Voters	—
Lichtenfels	—	—	—	—
Lindau (Bodensee)		Elmar Stegmann	CSU	—
Main-Spessart		Sabine Sitter	CSU	yes
Miesbach		Olaf von Löwis	CSU	yes
Miltenberg		Jens Marco Scherf	Greens	—
Mühldorf am Inn		Maximilian Heimerl	CSU	—
München		Christoph Göbel	CSU	yes
Neu-Ulm		Thorsten Freudenberger	CSU/JU	—
Neuburg-Schrobenhausen	—	—	—	—
Neumarkt in der Oberpfalz		Willibald Gailler	CSU	—
Neustadt an der Aisch-Bad Windsheim		Helmut Weiß	CSU	—
Neustadt an der Waldnaab		Andreas Meier	CSU	—
Nürnberger Land		Armin Kroder	Free Voters	—
Oberallgäu		Indra Baier-Müller	Free Voters/Free Voters Oberallgäu	yes
Ostallgäu		Maria Rita Zinnecker	CSU	—
Passau		Raimund Kneidinger	CSU/BU	—
Pfaffenhofen an der Ilm		Albert Gürtner	Free Voters	yes
Regen	—	—	—	—
Regensburg		Tanja Schweiger	Free Voters	—
Rhön-Grabfeld		Thomas Habermann	CSU	—
Rosenheim		Otto Lederer	CSU	yes
Roth	—	—	—	—
Rottal-Inn		Michael Fahmüller	CSU	—
Schwandorf		Thomas Ebeling	CSU	—
Schweinfurt		Florian Töpper	SPD	—
Starnberg		Stefan Frey	CSU	yes
Straubing-Bogen		Josef Laumer	CSU	—
Tirschenreuth		Roland Grillmeier	CSU	—
Traunstein		Siegfried Walch	CSU/BP/JL	—
Unterallgäu		Alex Eder	Free Voters	yes
Weilheim-Schongau		Andrea Jochner-Weiß	CSU	yes
Weißenburg-Gunzenhausen		Manuel Westphal	CSU	—
Wunsiedel im Fichtelgebirge		Peter Berek	CSU	—
Würzburg		Thomas Eberth	CSU	yes

*Re-elected highlighted in color

Wherever none of the candidates received more than half of the votes in the first round, a runoff took place on March 29, 2020. According to the Bavarian Ministry of the Interior, this was the case in 750 municipalities, cities and districts, including the five largest Bavarian cities of Munich, Nuremberg, Augsburg, Regensburg and Ingolstadt. Due to the COVID crisis, eligible voters could only participate in this runoff exclusively by postal voting.

=== Mandates by parties ===
The following table provides information on how many mandates the respective parties received in the district councils or city councils of the independent cities. In parentheses is the change compared to the 2014 local election. In addition, the total number of mandates won is given.

	CSU/JU	Greens	Free Voters	SPD	AfD	ÖDP	FDP	Left	Others
District councils	1,633 (-187)	665 (+223)	749 (-2)	520 (-263)	202 (+200)	143 (+4)	121 (+8)	48 (+41)	289 (-34)
City councils of independent cities	347 (-68)	224 (+91)	84 (-3)	208 (-94)	56 (+50)	40 (+6)	38 (+3)	37 (+14)	109 (0)
Total	1,980 (-255)	889 (+314)	833 (-5)	728 (-357)	258 (+250)	183 (+10)	159 (+11)	85 (+55)	398 (-34)
