= Markus Rinderspacher =

German politician

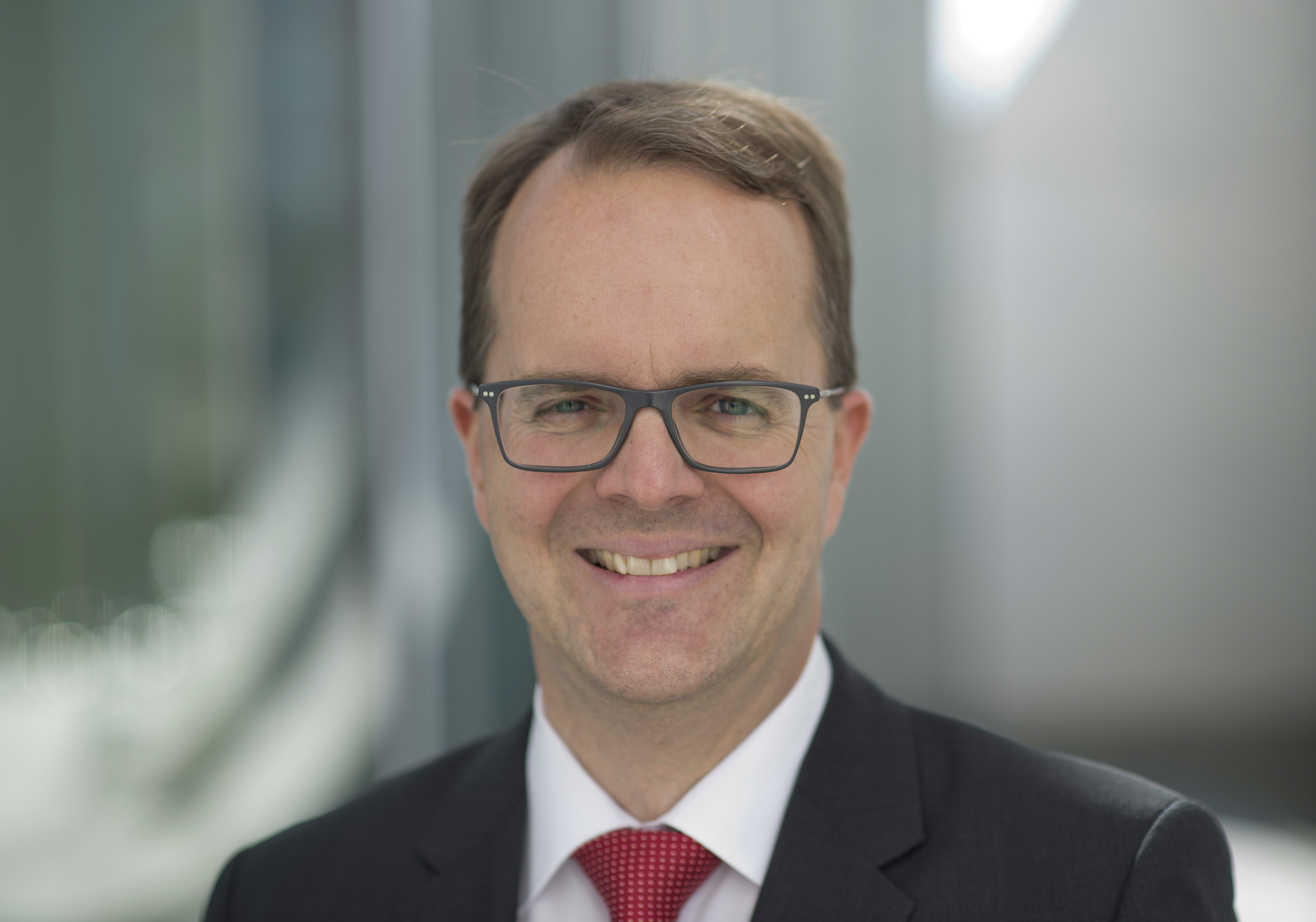
Markus Rinderspacher (2014)

Markus Rinderspacher (born 18 July 1969 in Kaiserslautern) is a German politician and television journalist and has been a member of the Bavarian State Parliament since 2008. From October 2009 to November 2018, he was SPD faction leader and thus opposition leader in the state parliament. Since November 2018, he has been the 5th vice-president of the Bavarian State Parliament and his faction's spokesperson on European policy.

== Education and career ==
Rinderspacher passed his Abitur in 1988 and, following his military service with the German Armed Forces Psychological Defence Battalion in Andernach from 1989 to 1991, trained as a bank clerk.

From 1991 to 1992, he completed further education in media marketing at the Bavarian Academy for Advertising and Marketing, and from 1991 to 1996, he studied political science, media law and psychology at LMU Munich. After completing his social science studies, Rinderspacher worked as a television journalist from 1996, but gave up his profession after being elected to the state parliament.

Rinderspacher is Lutheran and has one son.

== Politics ==
Rinderspacher, who has been a member of the SPD since 2002, was honorary press spokesman for the Munich SPD from 2005 to 2009. In the 2008 Bavarian state election, he was elected to the Bavarian State Parliament for the first time. In the state parliament, he initially served as a member of the Committee on Constitutional Affairs, Law, Parliamentary Affairs and Consumer Protection. On 21 October 2009, he became parliamentary party leader. He held this office for nine years.

After the 2018 Bavarian state election, Rinderspacher returned to the state parliament but announced that he would not run for re-election as parliamentary group leader due to his party's poor election results. Since 2018, Rinderspacher has been one of the deputies to the vice-president of the state parliament. He was re-elected to the state parliament in the 2023 state elections.

In March 2020, Rinderspacher proposed that postal voting without an application form should also be introduced for federal and state elections in the future, after the run-off elections for the 2020 local elections in Bavaria were held exclusively by postal vote due to the COVID-19 pandemic in Germany. Against the backdrop of growing mobility, he said this was a 'modern, citizen-friendly and sensible voting option'.

== Parliamentary role ==
Rinderspacher was elected Fifth Vice-president of the Bavarian State Parliament in November 2018 and has also been a member of the Council of Elders since then.

He is a member of the Committee on Federal and European Affairs and Regional Relations and has been his parliamentary group's spokesperson on European policy since 2018. Since 2020, he has been chairman of the parliamentary friendship group Bavaria-Taiwan. In 2022 and 2023, he was the SPD representative on the parliamentary committee of inquiry into the so-called mask affair.

== Public offices and functions ==
Rinderspacher is chairman of the board of trustees of the foundation Wings of Hope Deutschland, a member of the board of trustees of LMU Munich, the Academy for Political Education in Tutzing, the Bavarian People's Foundation, the Munich Forum for Islam (MFI) and the Georg von Vollmar Academy, Bavarian Philharmonic and the hospice service DaSein e. V., Konzerthaus München and a member of the parliamentary advisory board of the Bundesverband eMobilität. He is deputy chairman of the Bavarian State Working Group Malihilfe e. V., a member of the board of the European Academy Bavaria e. V. and the Munich Europe Conference e. V.

From 2008 to 2010 and from 2013 to 2018, Rinderspacher was elected by the Bavarian State Parliament as a member of the Bavarian Media Council, the broadcasting supervisory body of the Bavarian State Office for New Media.

== Constitutional complaints ==
At Rinderspacher's behest, the Bavarian state government received a reprimand from the Constitutional Court in June 2011. The SPD Bavaria parliamentary group wanted access to the so-called resonance studies and only obtained it when it took legal action. The Bavarian Constitutional Court finally ruled that the CSU-led state government should have informed the parliament about the content of the studies upon request. By refusing to provide various pieces of information, the opposition's right to information had been fundamentally violated, and the constitution had been infringed. The Bavarian Supreme Court of Auditors (ORH) had already sharply reprimanded the State Chancellery. It had, in an inadmissible manner, mixed government and party interests in the resonance studies.

In May 2014, Rinderspacher was again successful before the Bavarian Constitutional Court. The judges ruled that the questions submitted by the SPD regarding the so-called family affair within the Seehofer cabinet had to be answered.

In November 2016, the Bavarian Constitutional Court once again upheld Rinderspacher's complaint in its entirety and declared the regulations on so-called referendums to be incompatible with the Bavarian Constitution.

In December 2019, Rinderspacher achieved another partial victory with his lawsuit against the Bavarian Integration Act, which he had filed two years earlier as chairman of the Bavarian SPD parliamentary group. The Bavarian Constitutional Court deemed individual provisions to be unconstitutional.

== Protestant Regional Synod ==
During the synod period from 2014 to 2020, Rinderspacher was an appointed member of the Regional Synod of the Evangelical Lutheran Church in Bavaria.

== Honours ==
- 2017 Bayerische Verfassungsmedaille in silver
