= Florian Janik =

German politician (born 1980)

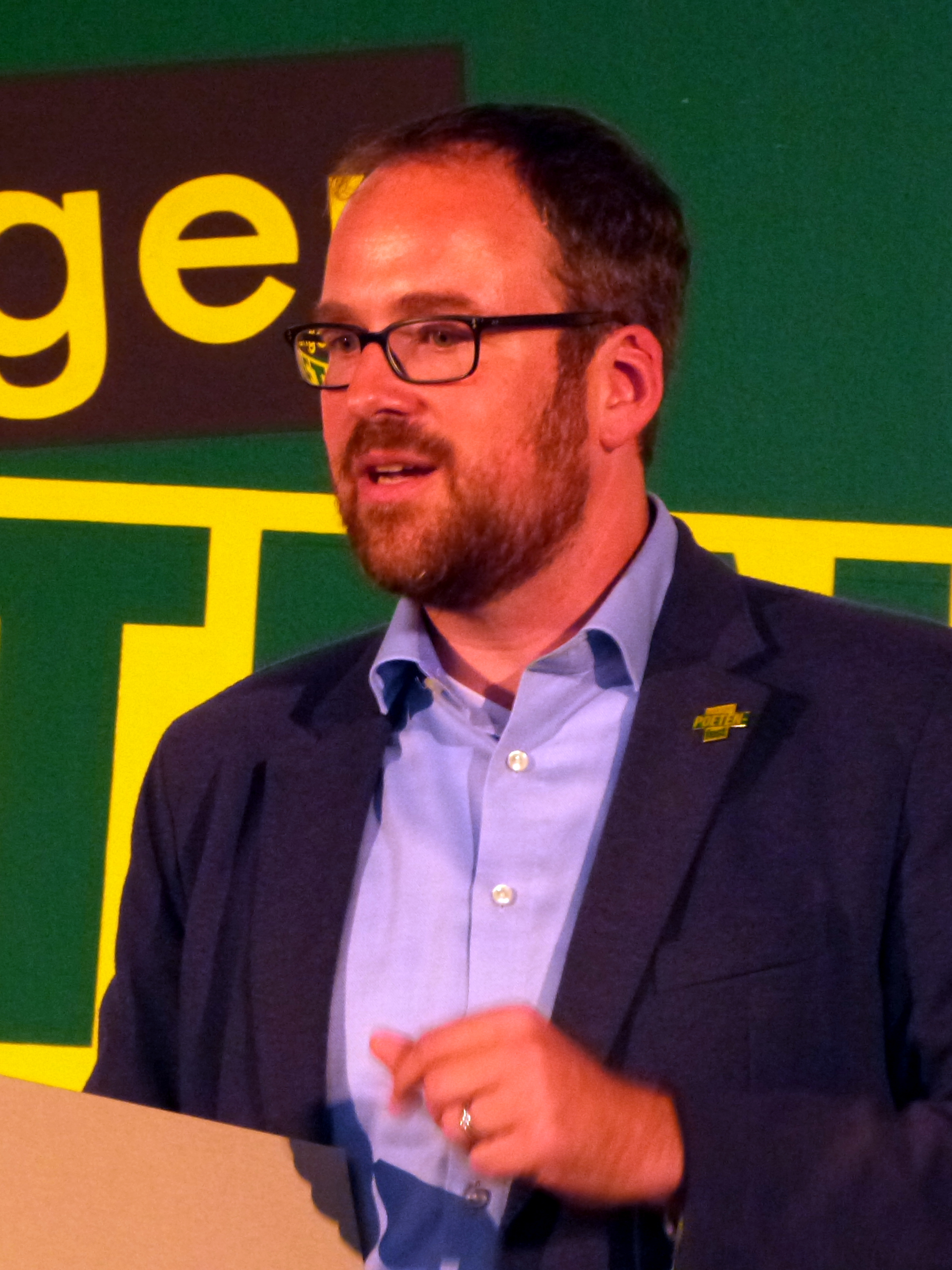
Florian Janik 2019

Florian Josef Janik (born 6 March 1980) is a German politician and was mayor of Erlangen from 1 May 2014 to 30 April 2026.

== Biography ==
In July 1999 Janik completed Abitur at the Ohm-Gymnasium in Erlangen. In 1999 and 2000 he attended civilian service at the Arbeiter-Samariter-Bund Erlangen-Höchstadt. He studied social science at the University of Erlangen-Nuremberg from 2001 to 2005. Since 2005 he was scientific employee at the Bundesagentur für Arbeit.

Florian Janik is divorced from Sylvia Janik and has two children, Lotta Janik (born 2009) and Max Janik (born 2011).

== Political career ==
In 1998, Janik joined the SPD and became member of Erlangen's town council in 2002. In 2008, he took over the leadership of his coalition party. In the mayor election on 16 March 2014 he got 37.2% of all votes. In the final ballot on 20 March 2014 he won against the previous mayor Siegfried Balleis (CSU). His term began on 1 May 2014. In the local elections on March 15, 2020, he competed against seven competitors and won 39.2% of the votes in the first round. In the runoff election on March 29, 2020, he won 54.5% of the vote against Jörg Volleth (CSU). Janik will thus remains Lord Mayor of Erlangen until April 30, 2026.

== Publications ==
- Aus betrieblicher Perspektive: Arbeitsmarktanalysen anhand des IAB-Betriebspanels, 2010
