= Transport in Bălți =

== Public transport ==
Passenger transport in Bălți is mainly carried out by the Bălți Trolleybus Authority and Bălți Bus Authority, as well as by private bus, minibus and taxi companies. The total number of transported passengers in Bălți in 2004 was 35,4 million passengers.

=== Buses and minibuses ===
The Bălți Bus Authority (B.B.A.) provides for 10 regular bus routes in Bălți and its near agglomeration. There are also private bus and minibus services, which are not regulated by the B.B.A. There are around 25 minibus lines in Bălți and its agglomeration.

=== Trolleybuses ===
There are 3 trolleybus lines in Bălți, the fourth line being planned to be constructed in 2007–2008. Most trolleybusses used by the Bălți Trolleybus Authority (B.T.A.) are different modifications of Russian ZiU and of Czech Škoda.

| Line | | Length | In service from | Number of stations | Serviced by |
|---|---|---|---|---|---|
| Line 2 | Molodovo – Aeroportul Bălți-Oraş | ?.? km / ?.? miles | 1970? | ? | B.T.A. |
| Line 2 | Gara Bălți-Slobozia – Cartierul "Dacia" | ?.? km / ? miles | 1970? | ? | B.T.A. |
| Line 3 | Combinatul de Carne – Autogara | ?.? km / ? miles | 1970? | ? | B.T.A. |
| Line 4 | Centru – Cimitirul | ?.? km / ? miles | 2008? | ? | B.T.A. |

=== Taxis ===
Bălți offers a wide choice of taxi services (more than 5 companies), most of which with a fixed tariff in the inner city. Three taxi companies are branches of Moldovan national companies, two taxi companies are Bălți registered businesses.

The "per km/time" fees is currently being enforced by the government through difficult negotiations with taxi trade unions.

== Roads ==
Bălți was and is an important transport hub of Moldova.

The best inter-city transport is coach or van (privately or publicly owned). The city is connected to the capital Chişinău with 135 km (84 mi) of Soviet style highway (portions in good or fair condition. By road, one can also reach Ukraine (in about two hours) to the north or to the east, and Romania (one hour) to the south-west by the Sculeni-Sculeni crossing point, which leads to the important Romanian city of Iaşi (104 km (65 mi) from Bălți), or to the west by the Stânca-Costeşti crossing.

The Bălți Inter-City Coach Station is one of the biggest in Moldova and provides for regular bus connections to almost any city and village in Moldova, as well as for numerous European and international connections.

== Railway stations ==
A regular rail connection to Ocniţa (north), Rezina (east) and Ungheni (south-east), as well as to Chişinău exists, although it takes today 3 hours 40 min hours to cover the 200 km (120 mi) to Chişinău.

The railway lines are not electrified, and contain only a single track between stations. When Moldova gained independence, the railway lines became the responsibility of Calea Ferată din Moldova (Railways of Moldova) State company.

There are two railroad stations: Bălți-City Station and Bălți-Slobozia Station (the name of a city neighbourhood), which both serve internal and international traffic.

== Airports ==
The city also has two operational airports. One of them, Bălți-Leadoveni International Airport (colloquially mentioned as Bălți Airport), 15 km (9.3 mi) north of the city centre (near the village of Corlăteni, formerly called Leadoveni), modern by Soviet standards, built in 1980s, where large aircraft can land (one 2,200-metre (7,200 ft) runway), is officially certified and operates both charter passenger and cargo flights. As of October 2007, it does not operate regular passenger flights.

A second airport, for small aircraft, Bălți-City Airport, is located on the Eastern outskirts of the city. It was the most important airport in the surrounding region during World War II, but currently is only used for municipal and regional public services, agriculture, emergency services and pilot training.
