= Bălți City Airport =

Defunct airport in Bălți, Moldova

Bălți City Airport Aeroportul Bălți-Oraș Аэропорт Бельцы-Город
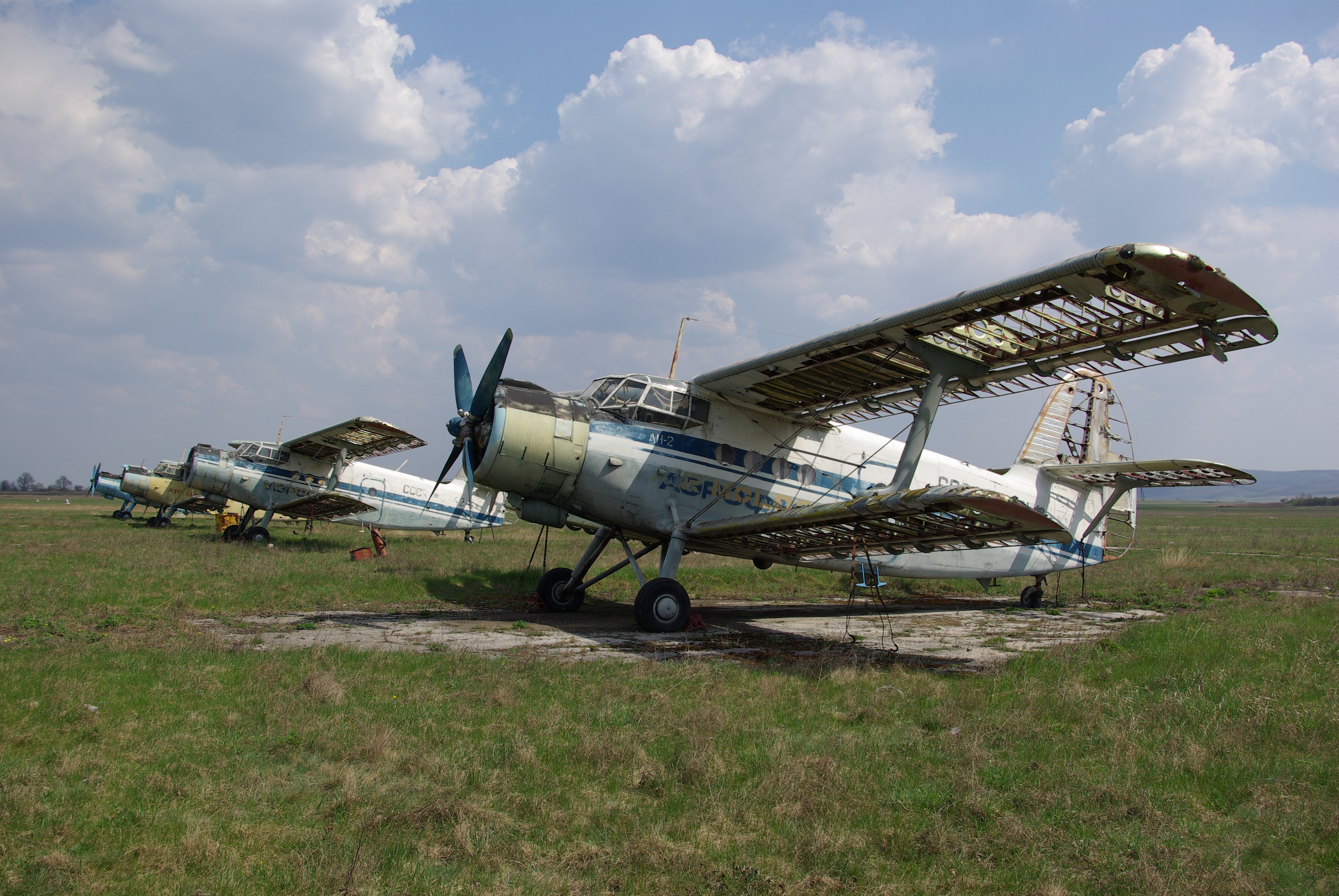
- Antonov An-2 parked at Bălți City Airport in 2009
- IATA: none; ICAO: LUBA

Summary
- Airport type: Public
- Owner: Bălți Free Economic Zone; Bălți City Hall; Government of Moldova
- Operator: Moldaeroservice
- Serves: Bălți
- Location: Bălți, Moldova
- Opened: 1954
- Closed: 2010
- Hub for: Aeroflot; Bălți Flight Unit No. 281; Moldaeroservice; Air Moldova
- Time zone: EET (UTC+02:00)
- Elevation AMSL: 302 ft (92 m)
- Coordinates: 47°46′40″N 27°57′19″E
- Website: www.helicopter.md

Maps
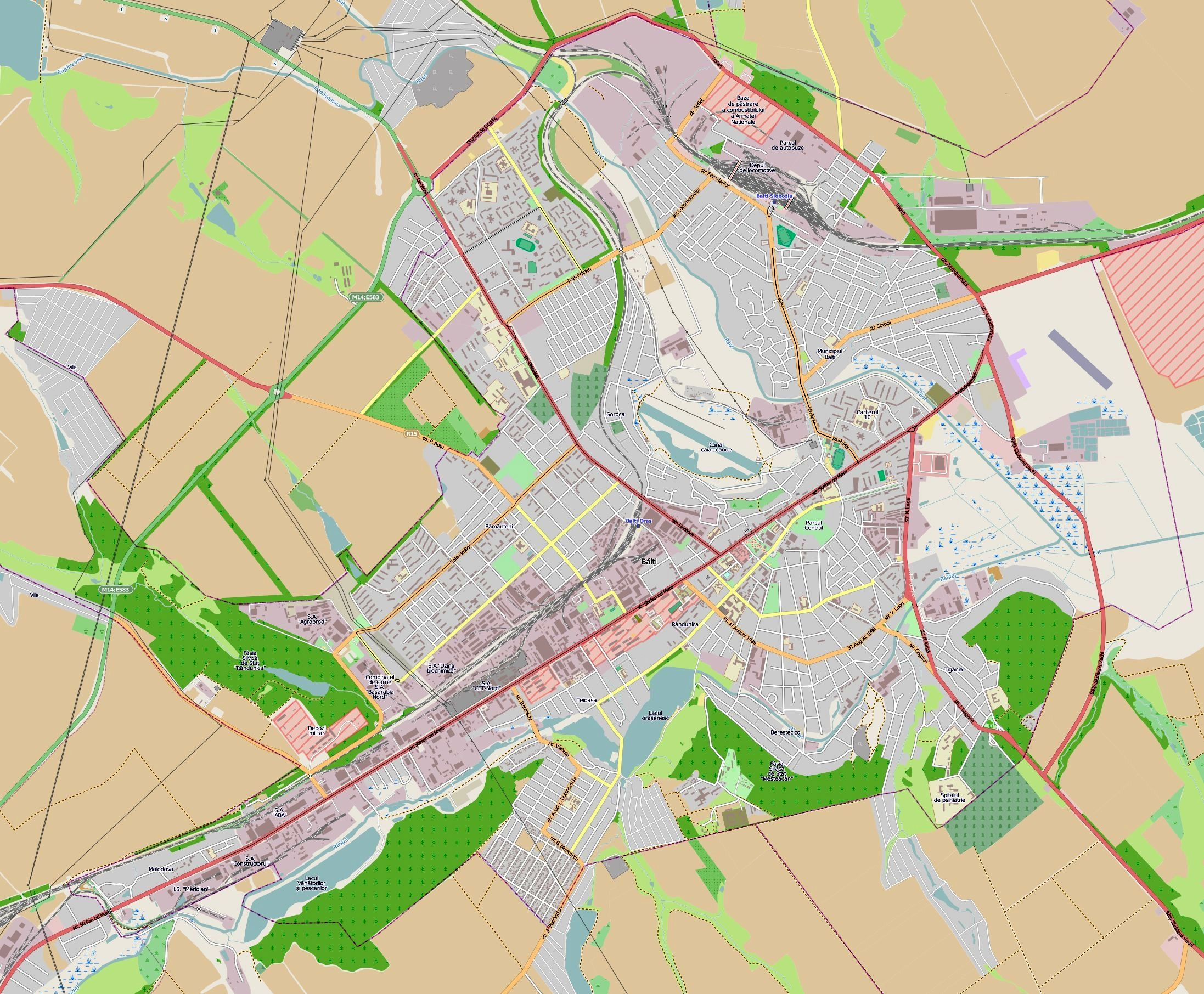
- Location in Bălți Location in Moldova Location in Europe
- Interactive map of Bălți City Airport

Runways
Direction	Length		Surface
Direction	m	ft	Surface
13/31	1,850	6,070	Grass
01/19	600	1,969	Grass

Bălți-City Airport (ICAO: LUBA) was the second largest airport in Moldova and one of the two major civilian airports in Bălți (the second being Bălți-Leadoveni International Airport located in the suburb of Bălți in Corlăteni).

Established after World War II to replace Moldova's main military airfield in Bălți (located in the suburb Bălți in Singureni), the Bălți City civilian airport was the second busiest airport in Moldova for domestic Moldovan and Soviet air traffic until the late 1980s, when the second airport in Bălți, Bălți-Leadoveni International Airport, became operational.

Bălți-City Airport ceased airport and air navigation activities in 2010, following the transfer of all airport real estate assets and land to Bălți Free Economic Zone, on the condition that Bălți Free Economic Zone builds real estate assets at Bălți-Leadoveni International Airport to replace the real estate assets including plots of land received from Bălți-City Airport.

Bălți-City Airport is located in the eastern limits of the urban area of Bălți opposite the suburb of Bălți, the village of Elizaveta, which is part of the Municipality of Bălți, at a distance of 3.2 km from the centre of Bălți. The airport consists of one passenger terminal which serves for both domestic Moldovan and domestic Soviet flights, as well as aircraft and cargo hangars and a control centre. In 1977, the number of domestic flights from Chișinău to Bălți exceeded 7 times the number of flights to any other most popular domestic destination in Moldova. During its existence, Bălți-City airport served about 30 destinations: both local domestic destinations and destinations in neighbouring Soviet republics (Ukrainian SSR, Russian SFSR).

During the Soviet period, Bălți-City Airport was a hub for planes and helicopters of Aeroflot airlines, Bălți Combined Aviation Unit (Bălți Aviation Unit No. 281) of the Civil Aviation Directorate of the MSSR, with civil air squadrons from Bălți at Chișinău airport and Bender airfield, as well as for planes and helicopters of Moldaeroservice.

== History ==
=== Origins ===
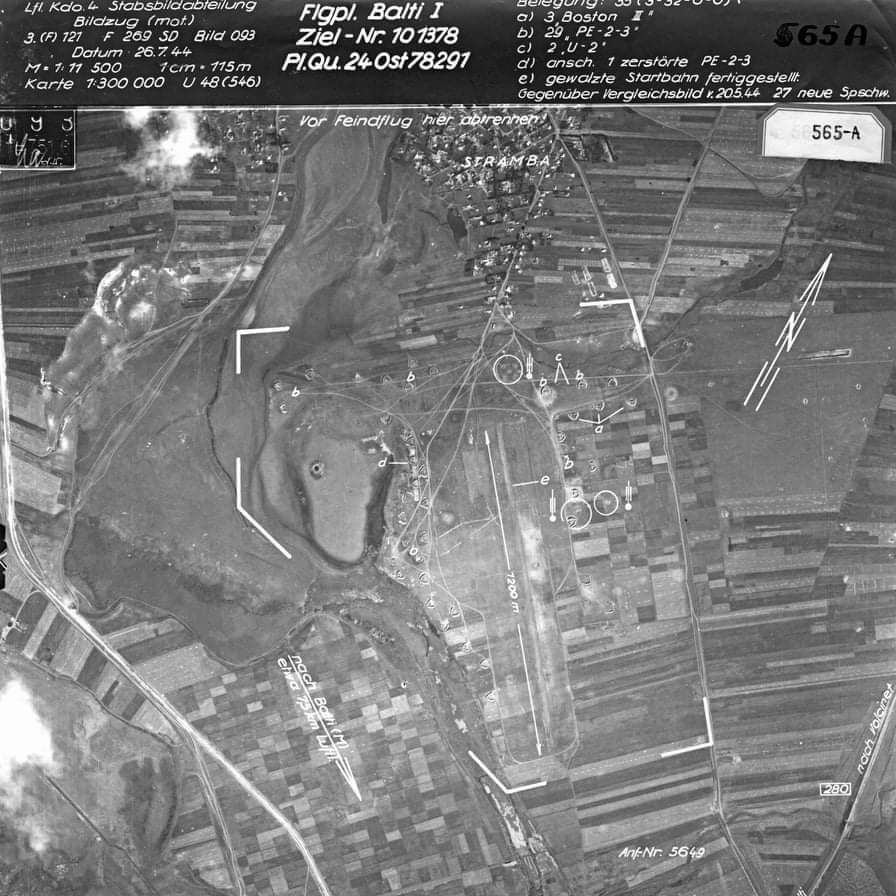
Aerial view by Luftwaffe dated 1944 of Balti military airfield located in Singureni

During World War II the main air military base of Bessarabia and the region was the Bălți airfield at Singureni with 5 advanced airfields used by IAP-55 of which 2 in the MSSR and 3 in the UkrSSR. After the transfer of Bălți to the jurisdiction of the USSR and at the end of World War II, the company Aeroflot came to Bălți, created earlier by the merger of Ukrvozdukhput and Dobroliot on 1 November 1930 (Dobroliot derived from Deruluft, a German-Russian company created on 8 November 1921). The development of civil aviation in the northern region of Moldova continued after 1944, when two Polikarpov Po-2 landed at the former Bălți military airfield in Singureni, followed by a Yakovlev Yak-12 from Chișinău The planes belonged to the Moldovan branch of Aeroflot.

In the post-war period, civil aviation was needed in the absence of a full-fledged network of functioning roads. In 1946, the Lisunov Li-2 bomber regiment was transferred to Bălți. The regiment was equipped with at least 35 Lisunov Li-2, whose military versions could carry about two tons of bombs, while the civilian versions performed regular passenger flights (particularly Bălți – Chișinău), carrying about 25 passengers. On 15 May 1947, the Bălți Flight Service Base was opened at the Singureni airfield. The same year, three Yakovlev Yak-12 were deployed from Chișinău to Bălți, carrying civilian mail and cargo, and then the following year they were used for passenger transport, as well as to transport medical personnel to populated areas, to transport seriously ill patients to Chișinău hospitals in the capital, and for transport in agriculture and forestry. The above-mentioned planes delivered mail to the following destinations from Bălți: Cuhnești, Ocnița, Glodeni and, if necessary, delivered 1–2 passengers to Chișinău.

The first years of operation of civil aviation after World War II at the Bălți military airfield in Singureni showed the disadvantages of the military infrastructure in Singureni that existed there for regular civilian flights, which included the long distance from the centre of Bălți for a relatively light aircraft that did not require a long runway and the lack of a highway linking Bălți with the airfield in Singureni. Indeed, the M14 highway was opened for the occasion of passing through Bălți of the olympic flame for the 1980 Summer Olympics and connected Bălți and the rest of Moldova with the Bălți-Leadoveni International Airport in Corlăteni a neighbouring village to Singureni. For these reasons it was decided to create a civilian airport within Bălți, in particular for the convenience of servicing domestic flights with light aircraft.

=== Development ===
In the postwar period, Bălți-City Airport quickly became the second hub of civil aviation in the Moldavian SSR.

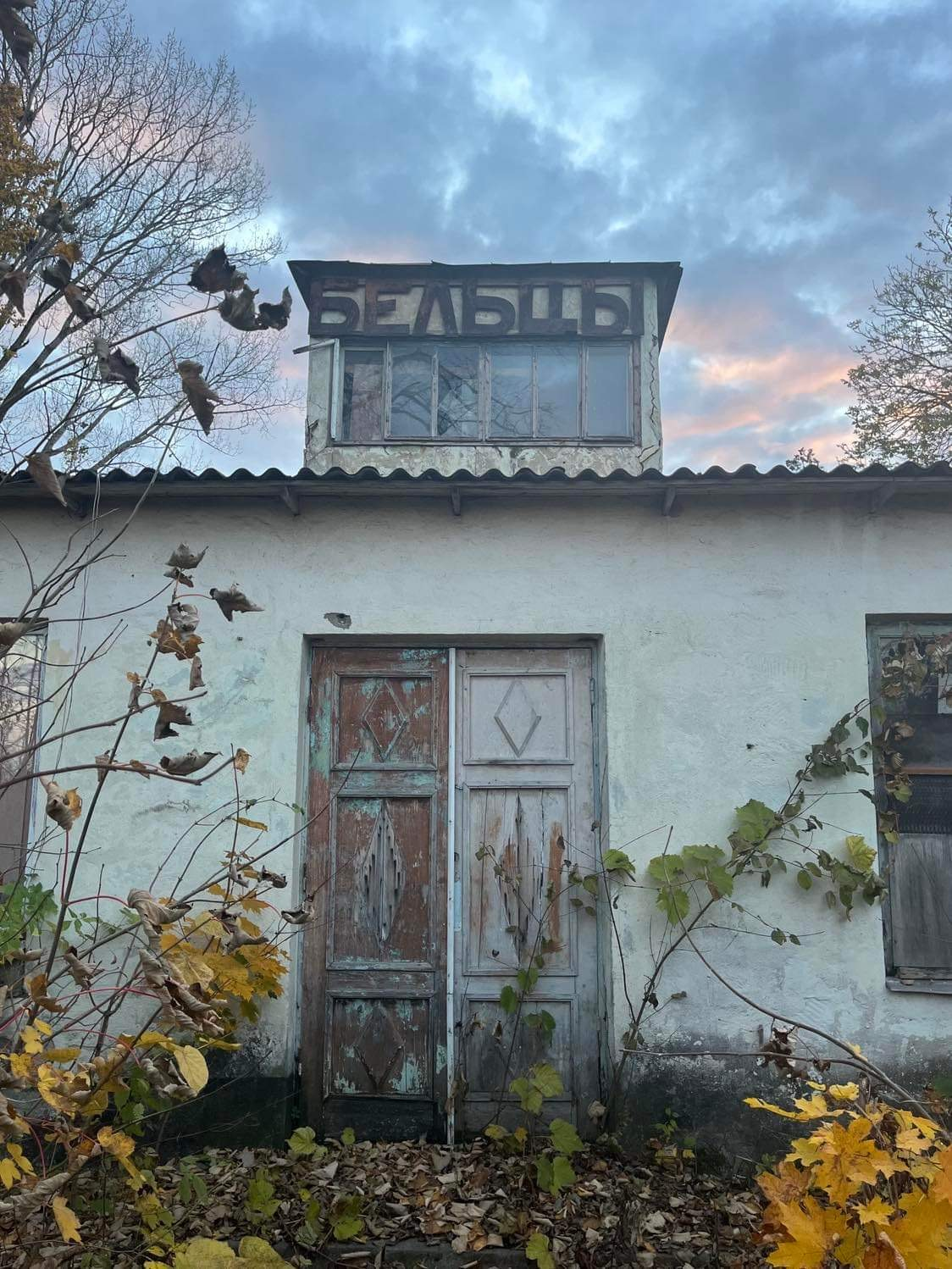
Passengers terminal view at Bălți-City Airport: arrival access from the airfield

In 1954, a new air terminal built at Bălți-City Airport was commissioned, and the military aircraft Lisunov Li-2, converted into civil aircraft, began to land from Bălți in Lviv, Ivano-Frankivsk and Chernivtsi. The first civilian squadron commander of the Bălți Aviation Company was A.N. Vorontsov.

Beginning in 1961, Bălți-City Airport began accepting Ilyushin IL-14 aircraft for landing and transporting passengers on intercity routes to the most distant cities of the former USSR by Aeroflot aircraft.

In September 1969, the Bălți Combined Aviation Unit Russian: Бельцкий ОАО – Объединённый Авиационный Отряд was formed. All Antonov An-2, Yakovlev Yak-12 and helicopters of Chișinău Flight Unit No 253 (that is, all of the above aircraft and helicopters of the Civil Aviation Administration of the Soviet Socialist Republic of Moldova were transferred to the Bălți Flight Unit No 281) of the Bălți Combined Aviation Unit. At the Bender (Tighina) airfield was based a civil squadron of Bălți Flight Unit No 281, consisting of 2–3 Antonov An-2 aircraft and 1–2 Mil Mi-1 helicopters. A xcivil squadron of Bălți Flight Unit No 281, consisting of 4–5 Antonov An-2 aircraft, was stationed at Chișinău Airport for medical missions and local air flights.

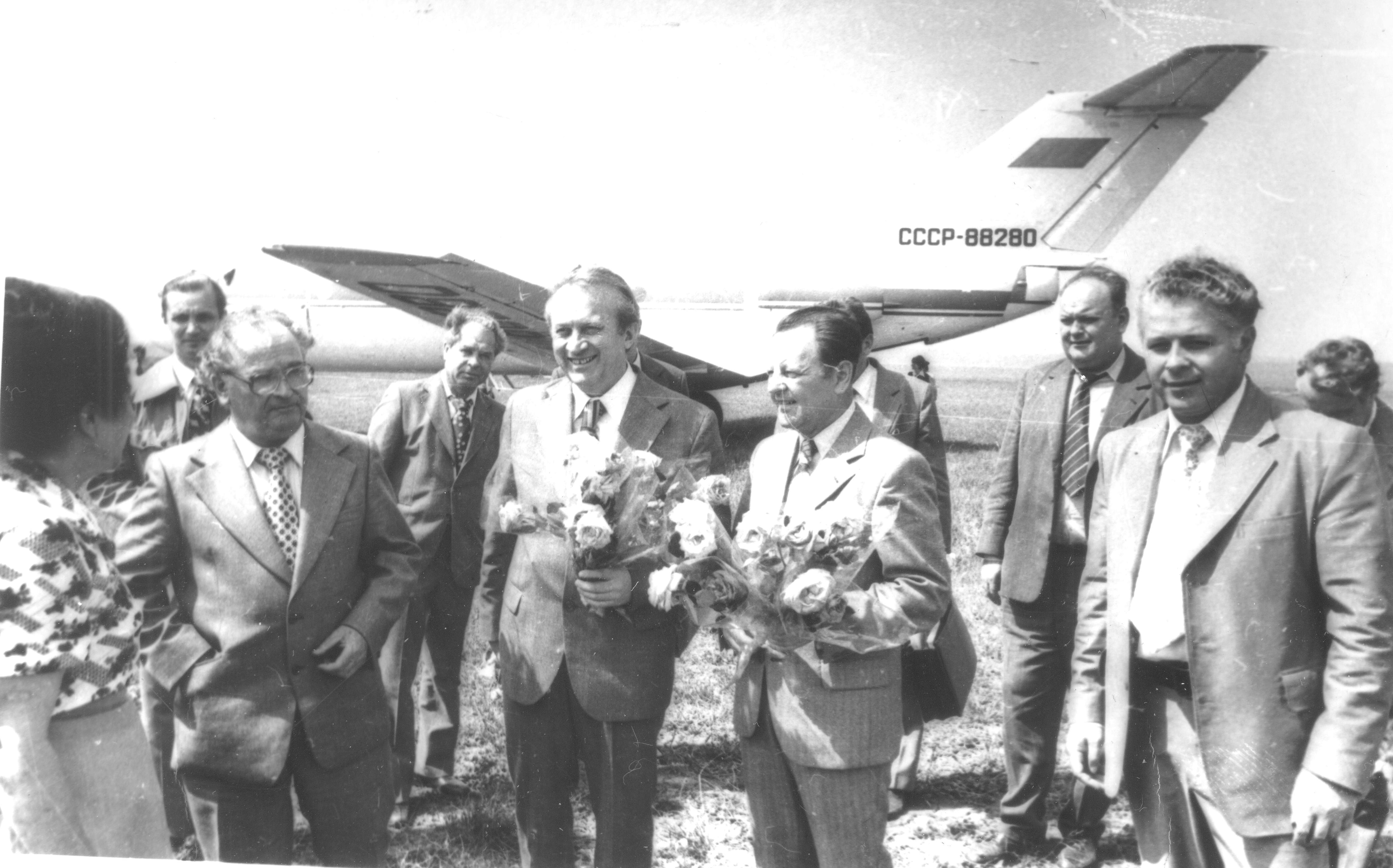
9 May 1979: a Yakovlev Yak-40C2 (ССССР-88280) at Bălți Airport (Bălți-City Airport). Departure of Jozef Lenárt and Miloš Jakeš from the Moldovan Soviet Socialist Republic. In the foreground (from left to right): Ivan Bodiul (second from left), First Secretary of the Communist Party of Moldova, Jozef Lenárt, First Secretary of the Communist Party of Slovakia, Miloš Jakeš, Secretary of the Communist Party of Czechoslovakia and Semion Grossu, Chairman of the Council of Ministers of the Moldovan SSR, at Balti airport.

The airport had an area of 136.49 hectares and was managed by Moldaeroservice, a company established by the Ministry of Transportation and Road Infrastructure.

Towards the end of the 1980s, passenger traffic at Bălți-City Airport began to decrease due to the appearance of land-based bus services on the new built roads of the Moldavian SSR and an increase in long-distance flights by jet aircraft – then, in 1987, the construction of a new runway capable of handling Tupolev Tu-134, Tupolev Tu-154 and Ilyushin Il-76 aircraft was completed. Since then regular flights by Tupolev Tu-134 and Antonov An-24 planes began to perform from the Bălți-Leadoveni International Airport. Until 2010 Bălți-City Airport together with helicopter helipads was used to serve the population, agriculture, as well as for irregular and short flights between the regions of the Republic of Moldova.

=== Decision of the Government of 2010 ===
Bălți-City Airport existed from the post-war period until 2010, when the Government of Moldova decided to transfer the land at Bălți-City Airport to the Bălți Free Economic Zone, with the obligation of the latter to construct immovable facilities at Bălți-Leadoveni International Airport in exchange for real estate assets received from Bălți-City Airport. To date, Bălți Free Economic Zone has not fulfilled its obligation to build immovable facilities at Bălți-Leadoveni International Airport.

Government Decision No. 983 of 19 October 2010 on the transfer of immovable property (supplemented by Decision No. 1199 of 31 October 2016)) has transferred all immovable objects of Bălți-City Airport to the Ministry of Economy for use and expansion of the Bălți Free Economic Zone (Bălți FEZ). In accordance with the feasibility study established by the Ministry of Economy in 2011, the real estate assets obtained by Bălți FEZ from Bălți-City Airport were meant for the creation of an industrial park and a business incubator. The strategic goals of creating an industrial park in Subzone 3 of Bălți FEZ are: to attract domestic and foreign investments in Municipality of Bălți, to increase the share of the industrial sector of the municipality and of the Northern Development Region in the total amount of industry through the renewal of competitive industrial sectors based on modern and innovative technologies, to take over the operational practices of foreign companies in industrial production activities, carrying out economic activities in line with the specific development opportunities of the Northern Development Region of Moldova, including more efficient use of public assets, creating jobs in the industrial park, developing human resources by increasing the quality of training in the park.

Today, despite the provisions of the feasibility study, including several buildings and recreational complexes have been built on the land of former Bălți-City Airport which was transferred to the Bălți Free Economic Zone.

== Access and ground transport ==
=== Public transport ===
==== Train ====
Bălți City Airport is located 5,9 km (10 minutes car drive) from Bălți Northern Railway Station and 6,1 km (11 minutes car drive) from Bălți Central Railway Station. There is no railway station directly at Bălți City Airport.

==== Trolleybus, bus, and shuttle bus ====
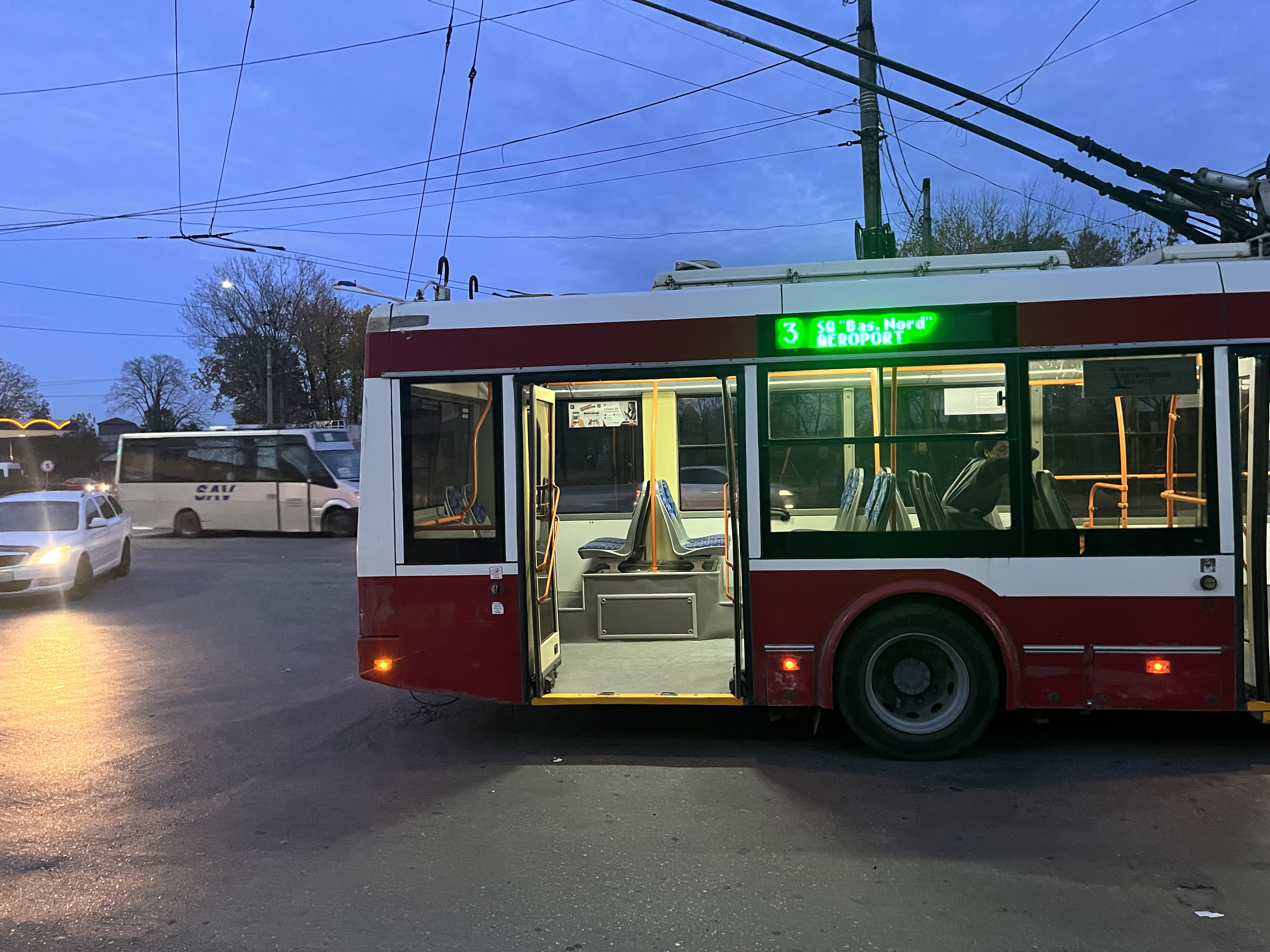
Bălți trolleybus No 3 at terminal station "Aeroport"

Most trolleybuses, buses and shuttle buses operate until the terminal station "Airport" or until the terminal station "Autogara" (located 3,1 km away from airport, 5 minutes car drive):

- trolleybuses: 1, 2, 2a and 3
- buses: 16, 25
- shuttle buses: 1, 18

=== Hotel access ===
The closest hotels to Bălți City Airport are VisPas (2,9 km in 4 minutes car drive) and Astoria (4,6 km in 5 minutes car drive). Remaining Bălți hotel network is accessible via public transport or taxis.

=== Taxi ===
Taxis are available upon order. There is no permanent taxi stand at the terminal.

=== Car ===
Access to strada Aerodromului, where is located Bălți City Airport, is available through the central strada Stefan cel Mare, national roads R13 (from Bălți eastwards through Florești to Rîbnița) and R14 (part of ring road around Bălți).

== Operator ==
In 1958, the Civil Aviation Squadron of Bălți (Бельцкая АЭ – Авиационная Эскадрилья) was formed in addition to the Moldaivan Special Aviation Group of the Civil Air Fleet (Молдавская ОАГ ГВФ – Особая Авиационная Группа Гражданского Воздушного Флота)

Since 27 July 1964 the Civil Aviation Squadron of Bălți has been subordinated to the Moldovan Special Aviation Group of Civil Aviation (Молдавская ОАГ ГАА – Особая Авиационная Группа Гражданской Авиациии).

Between July 1965 and 1966 the Combined Civil Aviation Squadron of Bălți (Бельцкая ОАЭ – Объединённая Авиаэскадрилья) was subordinated to the Combined Aviation Unit of Chișinău (Кишинёвский ОАО – Объединённый Авиационнный Отряд).

From 1966 to September 1969 the Bălți Flight Unit No. 281 (281-й ЛО (Бельцы) – Лётный Отряд) was subordinated to the Civil Aviation Directorate of the Moldavian Soviet Socialist Republic (Молдавское УГА – Управление Гражданской Авиациии).

Between September 1969 and February 1978, the Combined Aviation Unit of Bălți (Russian: Бельцкий ОАОАО – Объединённый Авиационнный Отряд) was subordinated to the Civil Aviation Directorate of the Moldavian Soviet Socialist Republic.

From February 1978 until 1 January 1983 the Combined Aviation Unit of Bălți was subordinated to the Republican Production Unit of the Moldovan Civil Aviation (Молдавское РПО ГА – Республиканское Объединение Гражданской Авиациии).

Since 1 January 1983, the Combined Aviation Unit of Bălți has been subordinated to the Directorate of Civil Aviation of the Moldavian Soviet Socialist Republic.

The state enterprise "Moldaeroservice", was founded in 1966 as the Bălți Flight Unit No. 281 (Бельцкий авиаотряд №281) of the Combined Aviation Unit of Bălți by order of the Minister of Civil Aviation of the USSR, based on the civil aviation squadron of Yakovelev Yak-12 and Antonov An-2 aircraft. Together with the Bălţi-City Airport Services, the Bălți Aviation Unit No. 281 formed the Combined Aviation Unit of Bălți.

The commander of Bălți Flight Unit No. 281 was appointed Nicolae Zavadschii, the head of the airport – Petru Ovcinicov, the head of the airport technical service base – Victor Șerstiuc and the head of the Combined Aviation Unit of Bălți – Vitalie Bezdenejnîh. Among the commanders of the Combined Aviation Unit of Bălți were: Alexei Lyciman, Yevgeny Ilyakov, Anatolii Bajucov, Alexei Alexeev, Vasilii Burma, Ivan Tomac, Vladimir Rishkov, Valery Cenin. Among the heads of the airport's technical services base were Grigore Rotari, Boris Cabac, Victor Gherta. The air navigation service was headed by Dmitrie Covalciuc, and the passenger service by Maria Ribacova, Alexandr Ojegov, Leonid Solovyov. The airport and ground service was headed by Petru Lobanov, Rașid Biriucov, Dmitrie Gubarev, Vasile Barabaș. Throughout its development, the company went through many stages of restructuring and advancement. In 1989 the concrete runway was put into operation at the newly built Bălți-Leadoveni International Airport (also managed by Moldaeroservice), thanks to which the passengers from the northern region of the Republic of Moldova gained the possibility of air travel to 14 cities of the former USSR with aircraft of the type Antonov An-24, Tupolev Tu-134, Let L-410 Turbolet until 1993.

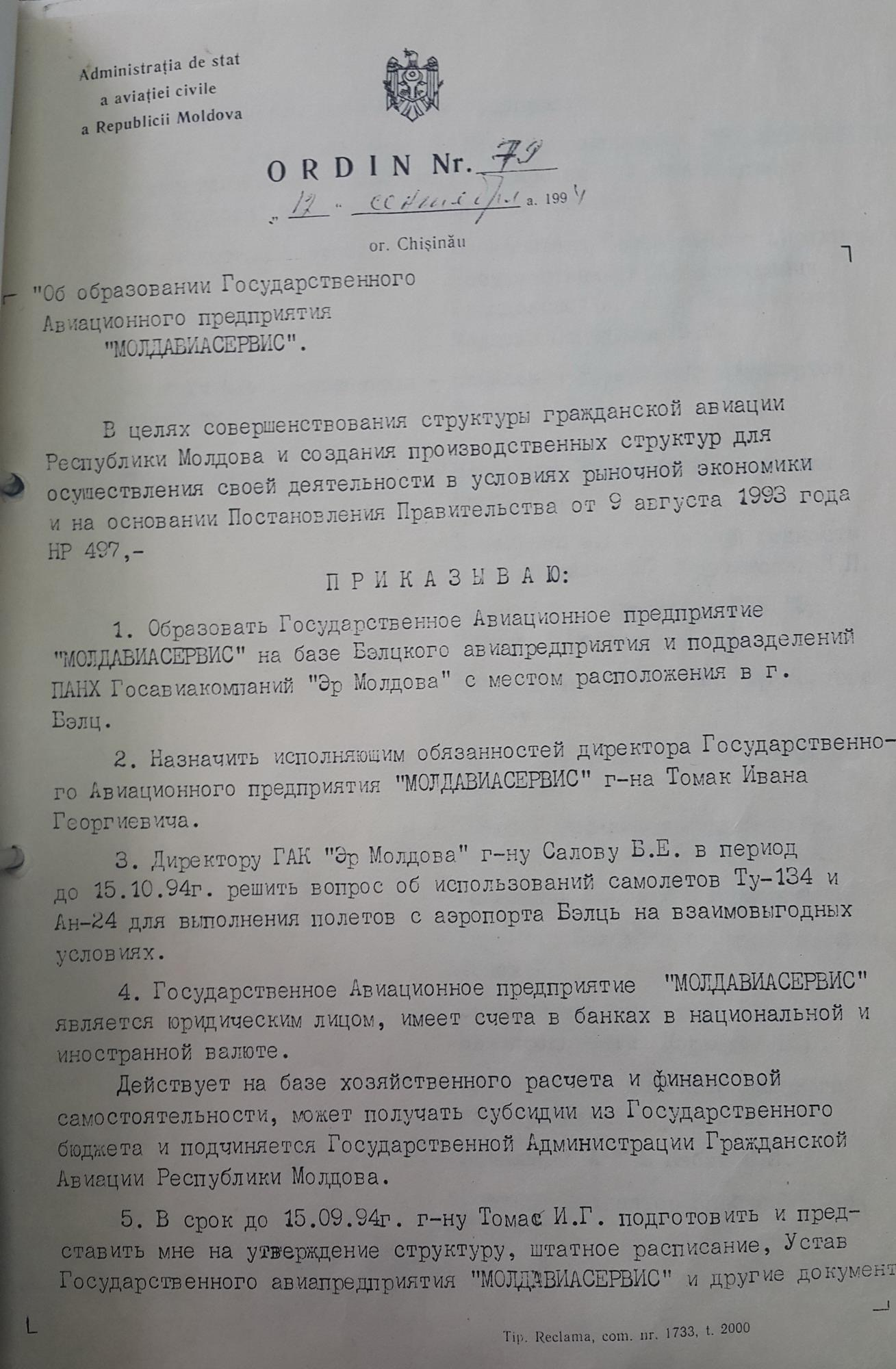
Order No. 79 of 17 September 1994 on the establishment of the state enterprise Moldaeroservice in Bălți on the basis of the Bălți Aviation Company and Air Moldova.

With the dissolution of the Soviet Union, the airspace control and surveillance service became an independent service, delegated to the Bălți branch of the state enterprise "MOLDATSA".

The Combined Aviation Unit of Bălți, which became the Bălți Aviation Company, was reorganised and renamed "Moldaeroservice" in 1994. Thus, the company became a self-sufficient company as "Moldaeroservice" with its own balance sheet, having under its management: Bălți-Leadoveni International Airport (145 ha), Bălți-City Airport (136 ha), professional staff, buildings and premises necessary for the technological and production process, Antonov An-2 aircraft and Mil Mi-2 helicopters. In accordance with the air operator's permit No. Md 001, issued by the Civil Aviation Authority of the Republic of Moldova, the company performs the following operations: air ambulance flights, observation flights, flights for search and rescue operations, advertising and leisure flights, flights for the benefit of the agricultural and forestry sector.

According to certificate MD.145.0025, Moldaeroservice is approved as a maintenance organisation for Antonov An-2 (ASH-62IR); Mil Mi-2 (GTD-350); C3; C5; C6; C7; C8; C9; C12; C13; C14; C18.9.

== Destinations ==
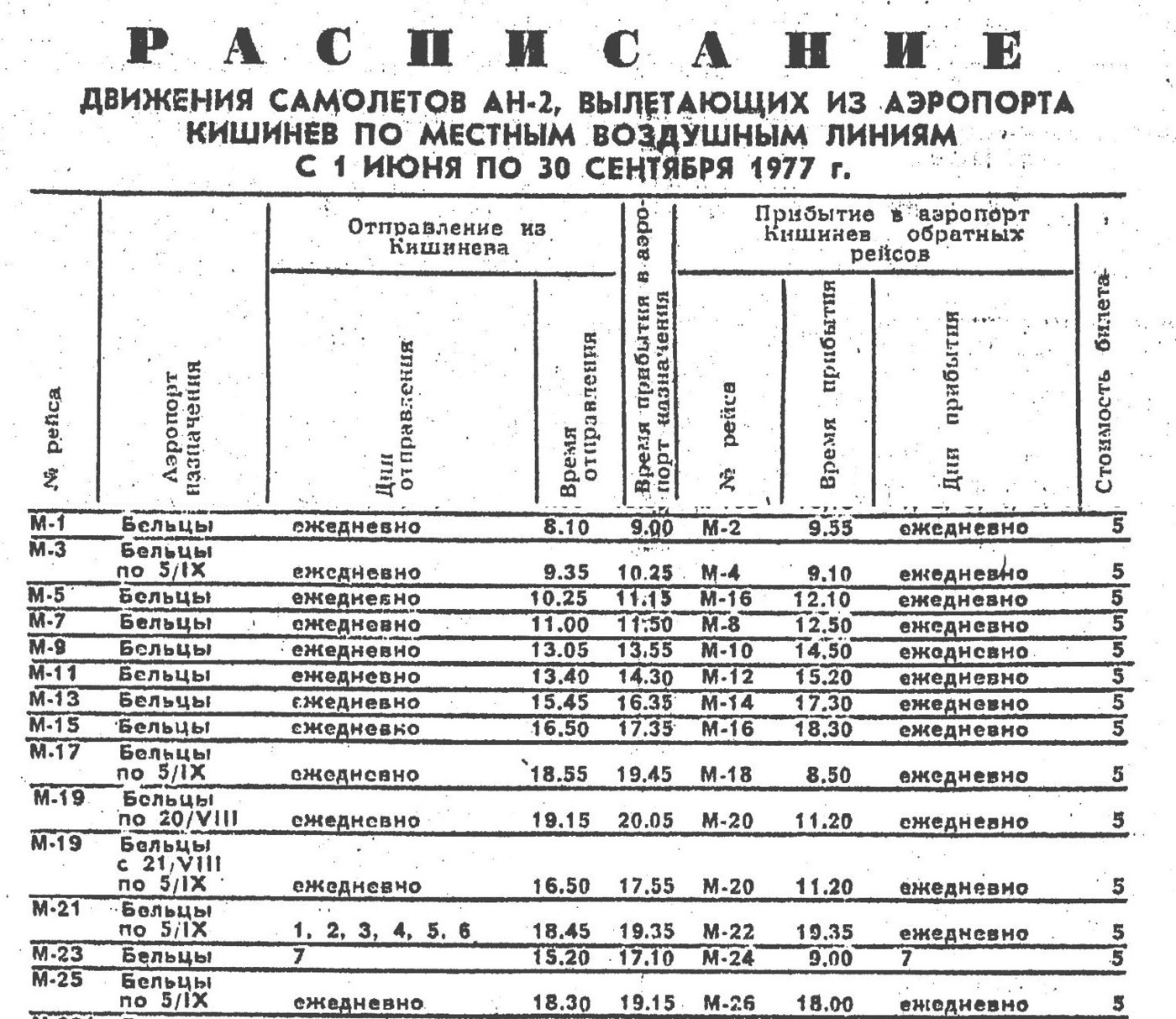
Scheduled flights from Chisinau to Balti, 1977. The number of flights to Balti from Chisinau is 7 times the number of flights to any other local most popular domestic destination

During the existence of Bălţi-City Airport, the main airlines operating scheduled and charter flights to/from Bălţi-City Airport to about 30 intra-Soviet and domestic Moldovan destinations were Aeroflot, Moldaeroservice and Air Moldova. Moldaeroservice was the last operator to operate from Bălți City Airport.

Direct services were provided to the extended territory of the former Soviet socialist republics and to the national network of localities of the Soviet Republic of Moldova.

In the late 1980s, Bălți-City Airport, with its airfield and heliport, served mainly domestic traffic between Bălți and the northern rajons of Moldova, mostly in agriculture and for public service needs.

Airlines	Destinations
Aeroflot – intra-Soviet lines	Moscow-Vnukovo, Saint Petersburg-Pulkovo, Kyiv-Zhuliany, Chernivtsi, Lviv, Ivano-Frankivsk, Simferopol, Odesa, Poltava
Aeroflot – Moldavian internal lines	Chișinău, Ocnița, Camenca, Soroca, Cahul, Cuhnești, Glodeni
Moldaeroservice	Chișinău
Air Moldova	Chișinău

== Images ==
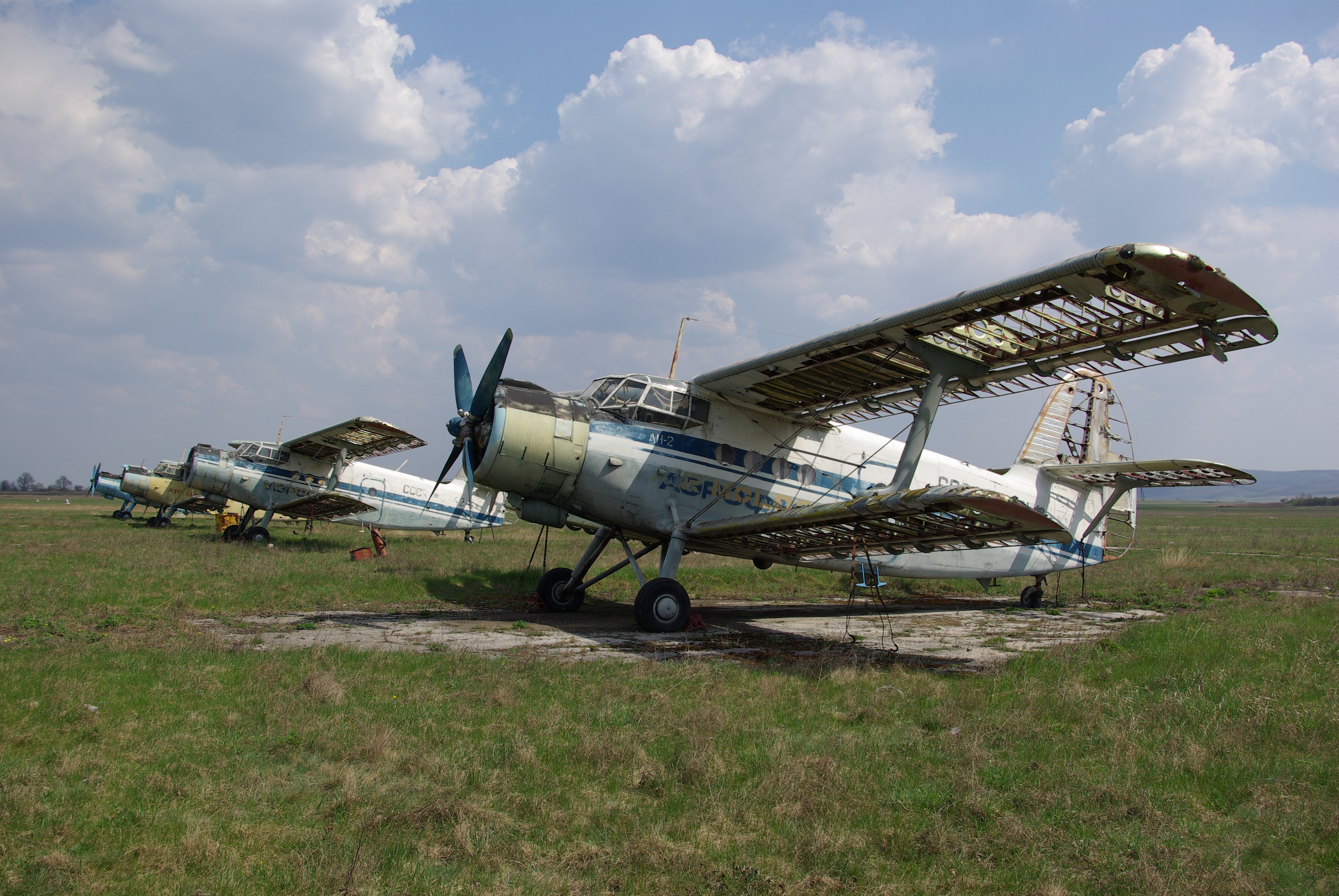

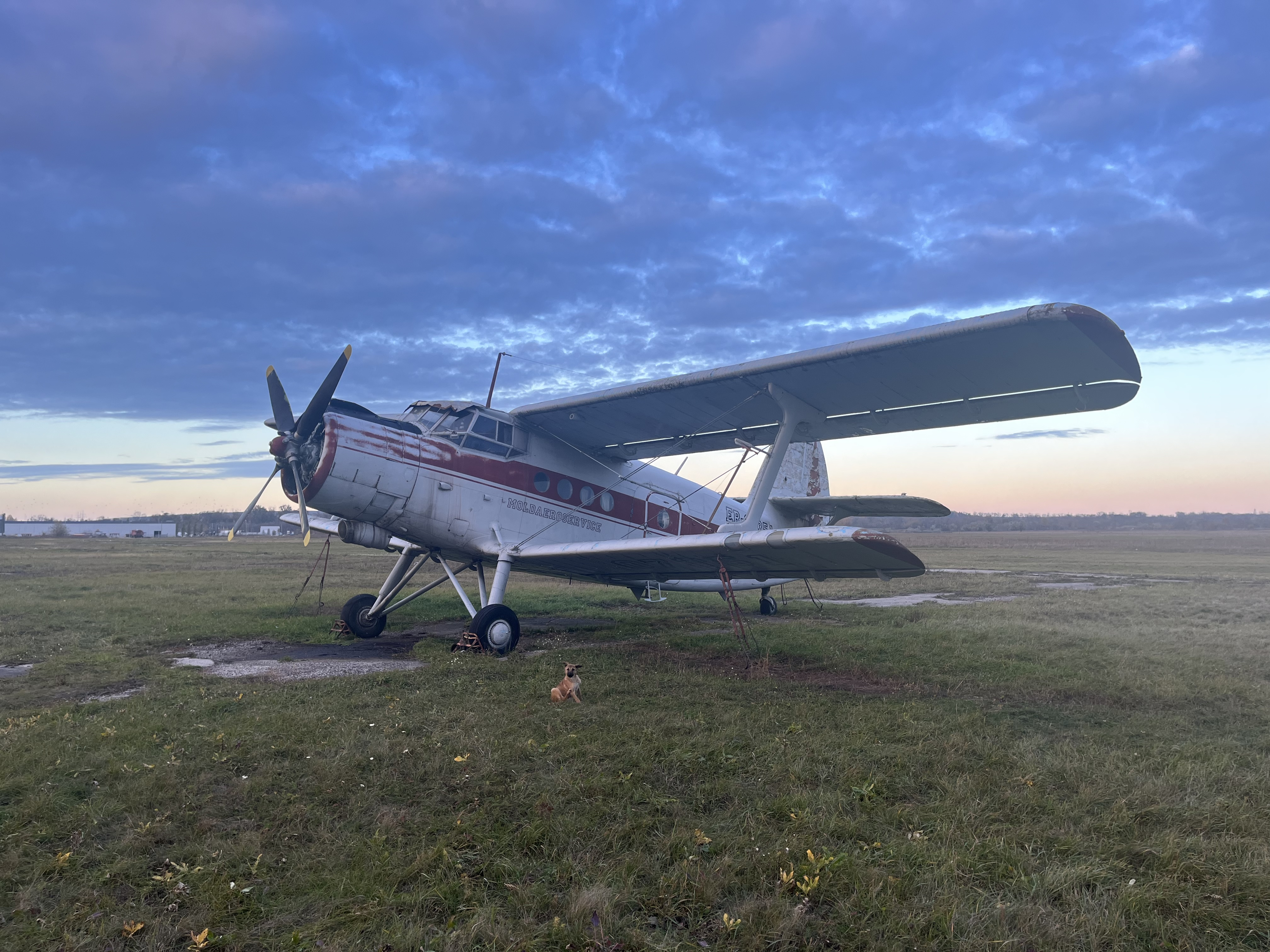

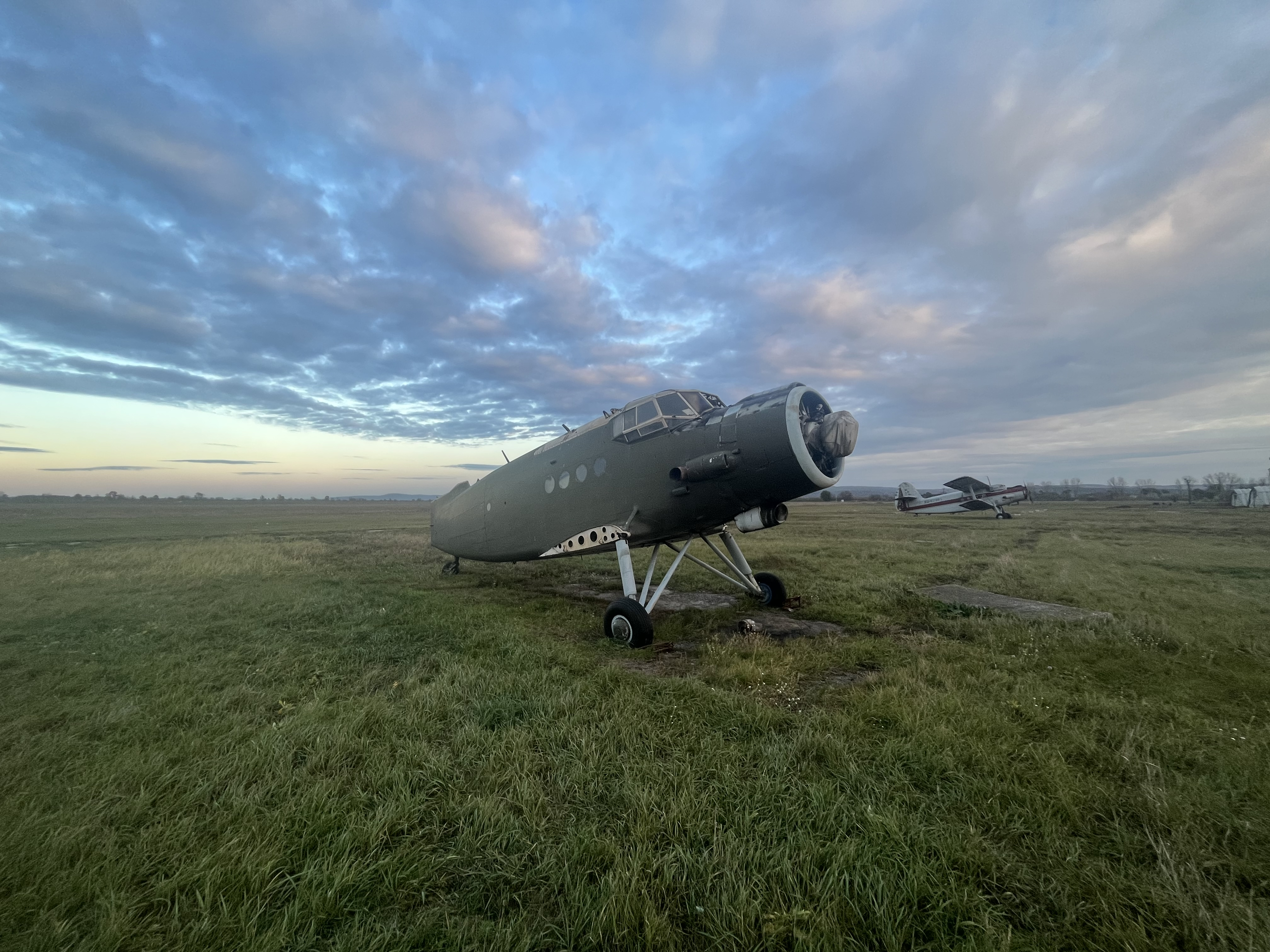

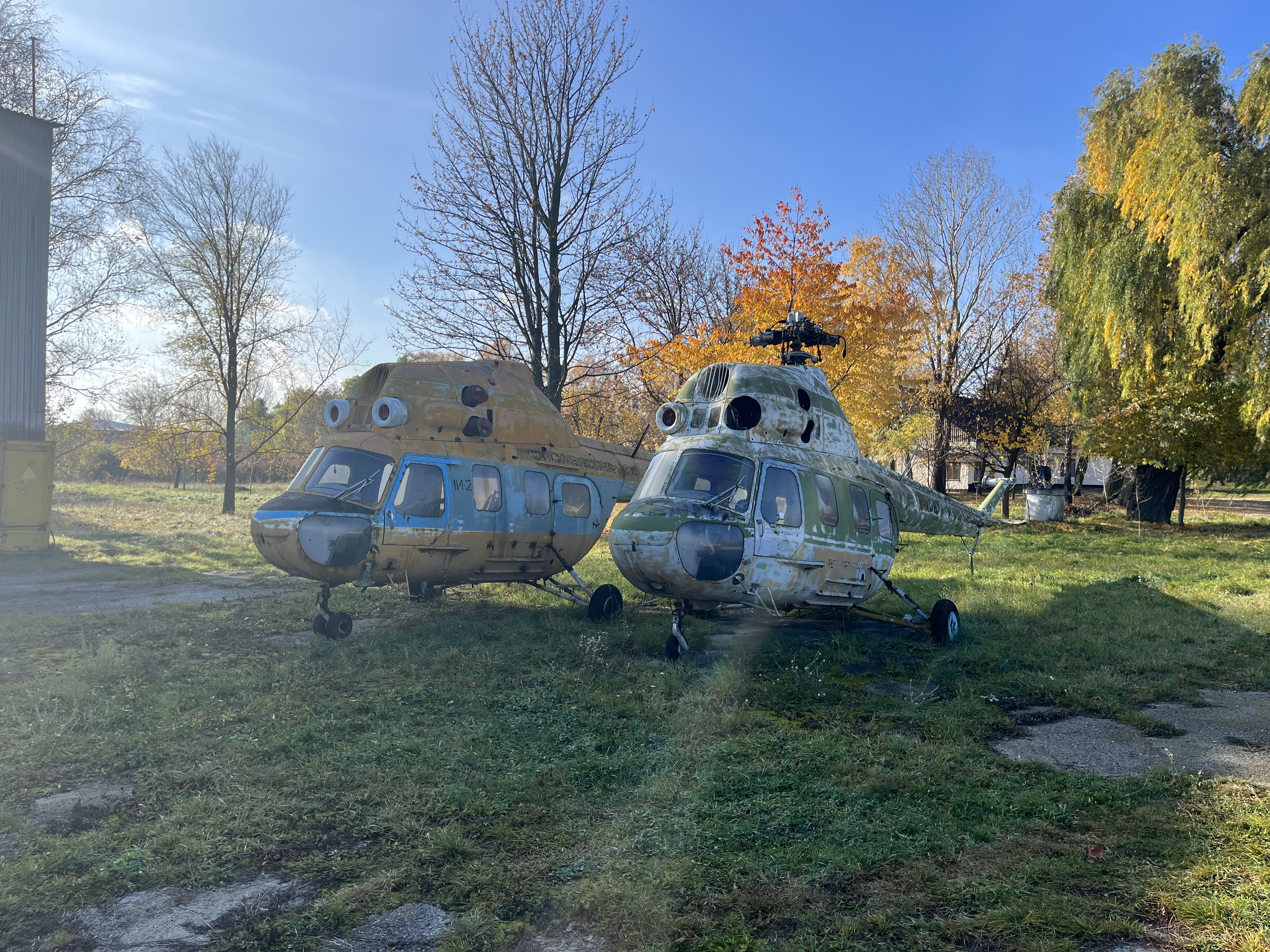

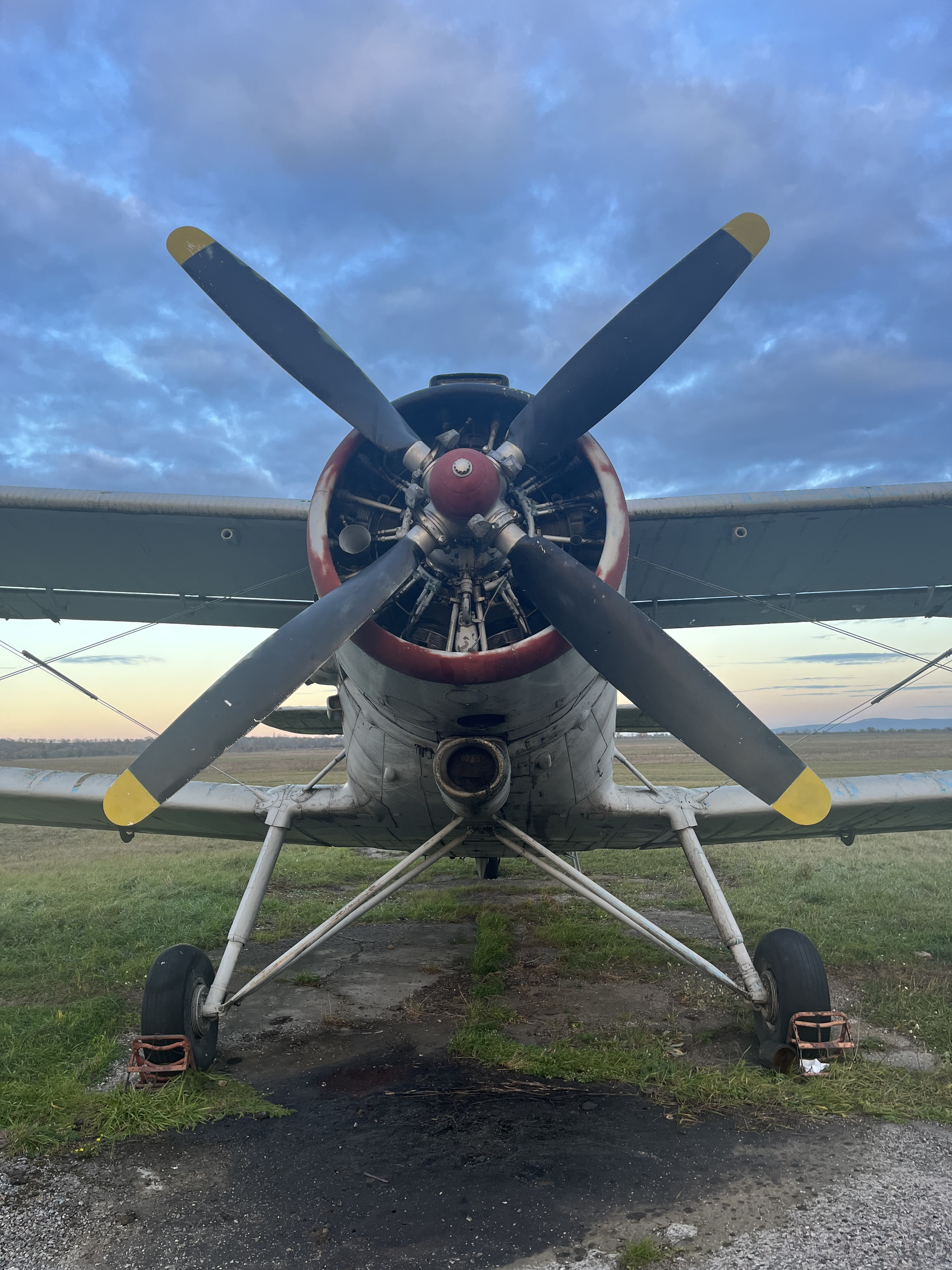

== Incidents ==
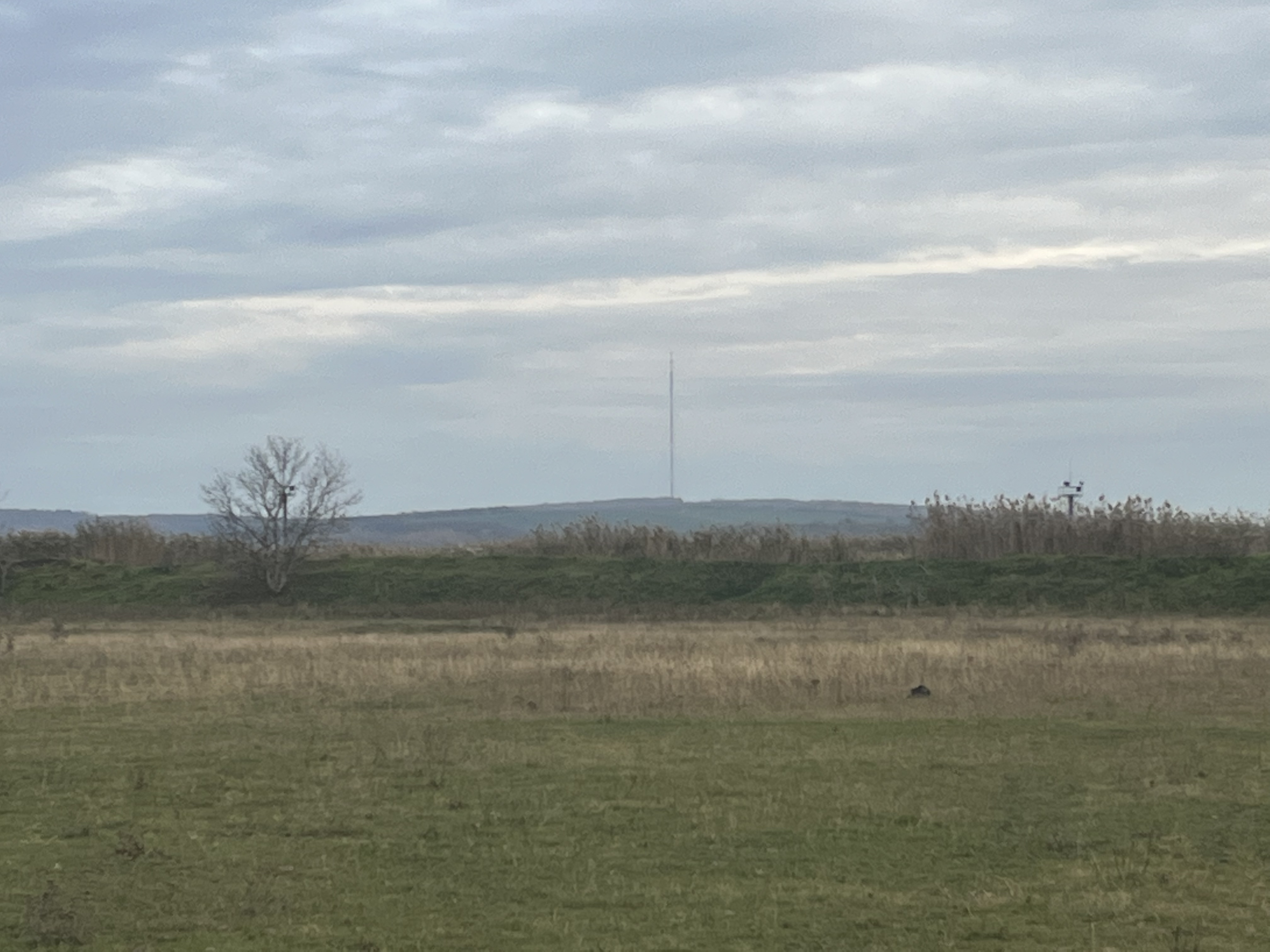
View to Mîndreștii Noi television tower from end of runway of Bălți-City Airport.

- On 1 March 1950, a Lisunov Li-2 aircraft crashed in Bălți. The plane crashed on take-off from the airfield, killing three pilots of the Li-2 bomber while performing a training flight. The plane hit a hill near the village of Mîndreștii Noi, where there is now a television tower, in heavy snowfall and zero visibility. The pilots asked for the flight to be cancelled, and the flight manager said no: "No, that's it, Odessa is not cancelling, keep flying". The aircraft was accelerating on the longest runway, "apparently they could not gain enough acceleration and altitude". The two pilots at the front in the cockpit survived. At the back of the plane the flight engineer Mikhail Ivanov, the navigator Myakotin and the gunner-radiologist Nikolay Fedorov, all three died. Commander Khestanov sustained minor injuries, while co-pilot Ivan Kravtsov spent a year in a hospital in Odessa. "The dead crew members were buried by the whole city. They were lying in the pilots' club, which is now a municipal court (there was a pilots' town between Mira Street and Moskovskaya Street)." All three of them were buried in the cemetery on Decebal Street. Then Myakotin's widow took the remains of her husband back home and later when a military burial was created in a new cemetery on Gagarin street in Bălți, the remains of Ivanov and Fedorov were also reburied in the new cemetery.
- On 10 December 1961, an accident occurred involving an aircraft technician of the 253rd Special Operations Squadron of the Moldaivan Special Aviation Group of the Civil Air Fleet. After conducting three morning flights from Bălți-City Airport, the aircraft technician visited the canteen and found himself intoxicated before the Antonov An-2 aircraft started training flights. The suspended pilot was instructed to prepare the An-2 aircraft for training flights. He was assisted by an avionics technician together with an aircraft mechanic, knowing that the technician was drunk. As a result of his negligence, the plane was accessed by strangers visiting one of the airport workers. The technician started the engine and went for take-off together with the passengers who happened to be on the plane. While taxiing, an attempt was made to stall the aircraft by the pilot-in-command and the co-pilot, who tried to jump in but were blown away by the rudder of the plane. The father of an underage passenger also tried to enter the moving plane. The airport commander and airport controller tried to steer the aircraft technician away from taxiing and only after takeoff at 11:25 a.m. the aircraft technician started to answer from the radio, using obscene words. Two simulated approaches were made over the airfield. Seeing this, the commander of civil aviation squadron gave instructions to decelerate and land. However, the aircraft technician would go back to climbing in altitude again each time. Flying at low altitude over the city, the aircraft hit the power line pole with its lower left wing, knocking out part of the wing and the strut between the surface area of the wings. Then, after hitting the poles in two more places, the aircraft blew out its left landing gear strut and, losing speed, crashed onto a city street at 11:43 am. After the crash, a bystander quickly opened the door and jumped out of the plane with the boy first, followed by the aircraft engineer. The plane caught fire and burst into flames. The aircraft technician was unharmed. The passengers got minor injuries. There were no injuries on the ground.

== Famous personalities related to history of Bălți aviation ==
- Alexander Pokryshkin
- Rudolf Schmidt
- Grigory Leadov
- Reinhard Heydrich
- Grigore Baștan
- Nadia Russo
- Robert Frimtzis

== See also ==
- Civil Aviation Administration of Moldova
- List of airports in Moldova
