= Bălți International Airport =

Airport in Moldova

Bălți International Airport Aeroportul Internațional Bălți
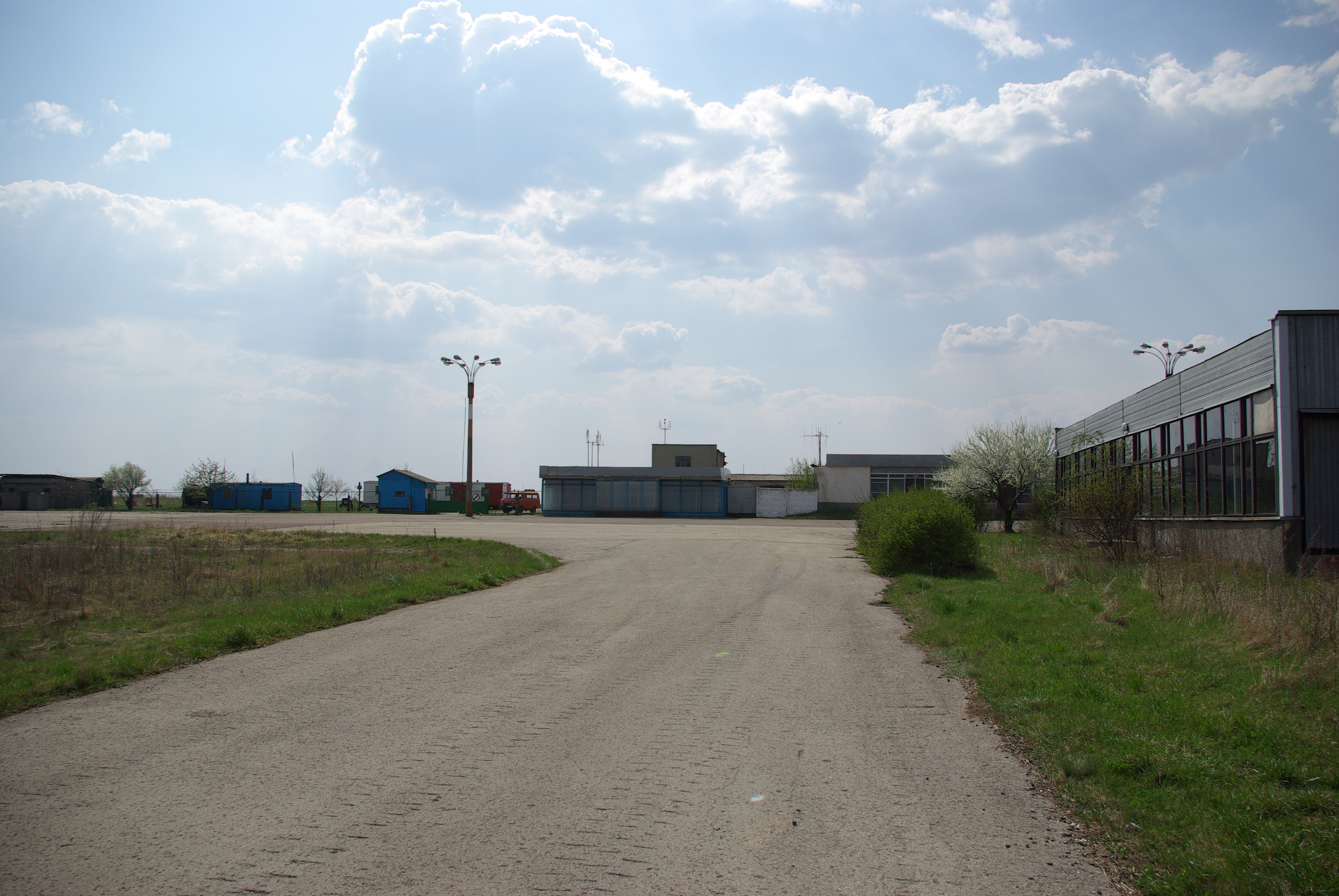
- View of the passenger terminal – departure (building in front) and arrival (building on the right)
- IATA: BZY; ICAO: LUBL; WMO: 33745

Summary
- Airport type: Public
- Owner: Government of Moldova through the Public Property Agency
- Operator: Moldaeroservice; Soviet period: Bălți Flight Unit No 281 of Bălți Combined Aviation Unit
- Serves: Bălți Moldova
- Location: Corlăteni, Rîșcani): distance from the city centre: Bălți 15.1 kilometres (9.4 mi) (9.7 kilometres (6.0 mi) from the northern city limit); road access: European route E583/M5 expressway and Republican Road R12; railroad access: Pelinia railway station 12.4 kilometres (7.7 mi), Bălți Western railway station 14.2 kilometres (8.8 mi), Bălți Northern railway station 14.9 kilometres (9.3 mi); local, long-distance and international public transport to/from Bălți
- Opened: 1989; 37 years ago
- Hub for: Aeroflot; Moldaeroservice; Air Moldova
- Time zone: EET (+2)
  - Summer (DST): +3 (+3)
- Elevation AMSL: 231 m / 758 ft
- Coordinates: 47°50′35″N 027°46′38″E
- Website: www.helicopter.md

Map
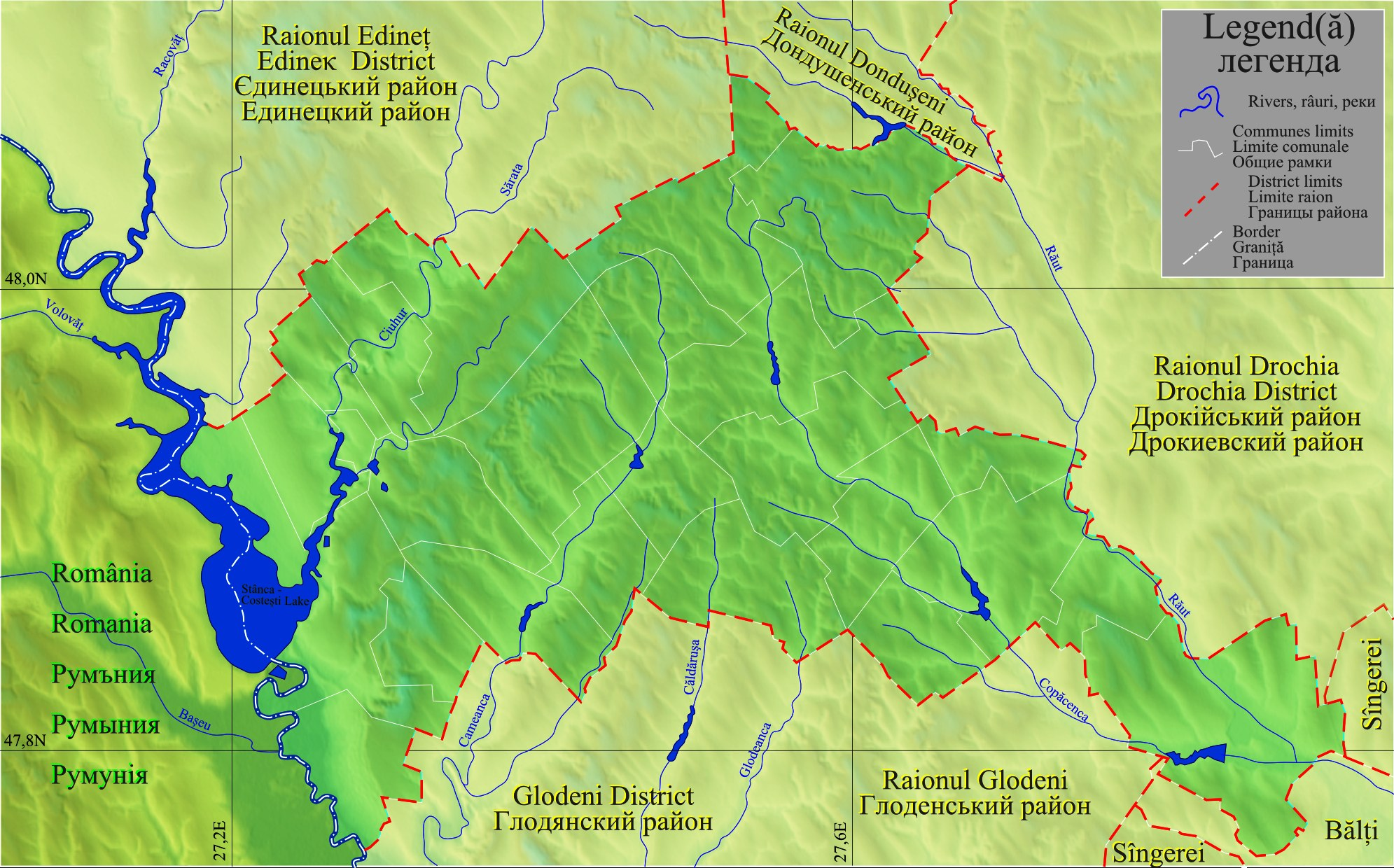
- location in Moldova BZY/LUBL (Moldova) BZY/LUBL (Europe)

Runways
Direction	Length		Surface
Direction	m	ft	Surface
15/33	2,240	7,350	Concrete
- Source: Airport-Data.com

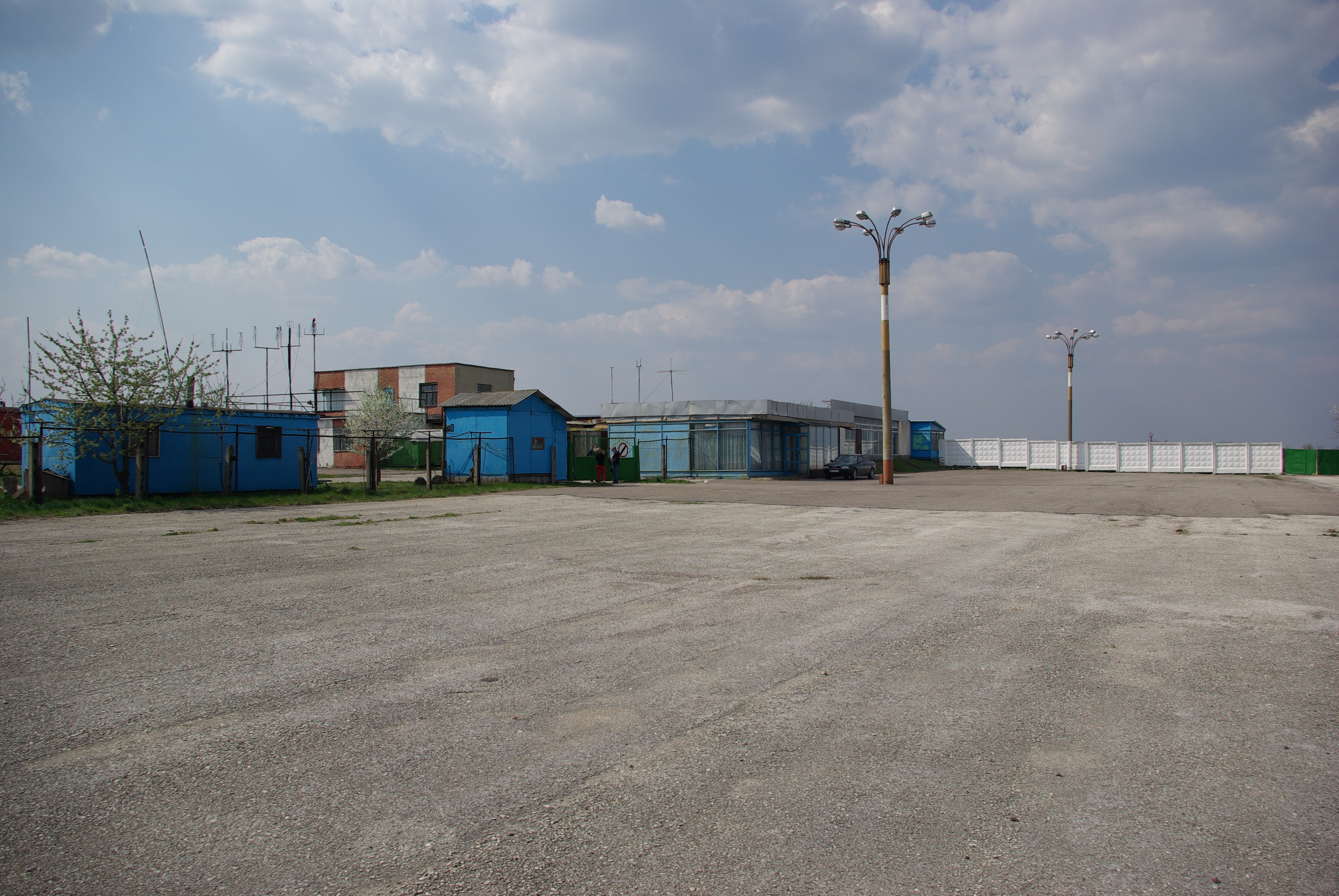

Bălți International Airport (IATA: BZY, ICAO: LUBL) — also known as Bălți–Leadoveni International Airport — is the second-largest international civilian airport in Moldova and one of the two main airports in Bălți, serving the city of Bălți and northern Moldova for civil passenger and cargo flights. Bălți-Leadoveni International Airport was opened in 1989 to replace Bălți-City Airport particularly on international routes and to ease air traffic to Chișinău Eugen Doga International Airport.

The second airport in Bălți is the first historic Bălți airport for scheduled flights – the Bălți-City Airport in the "Autogara" ("Bus Station") area, in the eastern limits of the Bălți urban area, which after the commissioning of the Bălți-Leadoveni International Airport in its last years of active operation (late 1980s) was used as a regional airport used for emergency services, agriculture, aviation works and regional transport.

Bălți International Airport is capable of round-the-clock operation throughout the year and is located outside the Bălți city boundaries, in the village of Corlăteni, Rîșcani District, 15.1 kilometres (9.4 mi) from Bălți city centre (9.7 kilometres (6.0 mi) from the northern outskirts of the Bălți city district of "Dacia", or as it is called "Bam"), with direct access to the European route E583 / M5 expressway and the Republican Road R12. The location of Bălți International Airport runway is the most advantageous compared to airports and airfields in the region (i.e. compared to Chișinău Eugen Doga International Airport and Marculesti military airfield), which ensures continuous operation of Bălți International Airport without long closures that can last several days at Chișinău Eugen Doga International Airport and at Marculesti military airfield.

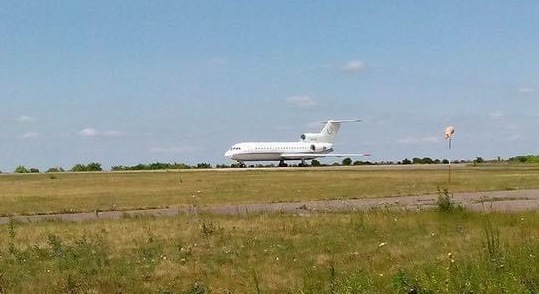
Take-off of a Yakovlev Yak-42 from Bălți International Airport

Since its opening, the airport has served as a hub for Moldovan branch of Aeroflot, then for Air Moldova, and as the main base for Moldaeroservice. In the history of civil aviation of the Republic of Moldova, only the Chișinău Eugen Doga International Airport and the Bălți International Airport operated regular Tupolev Tu-134 flights.

The airport was certified and opened for passenger and cargo services, operating regular passenger flights from 1989 – the year the concrete runway was commissioned at the newly built Bălți-Leadoveni Airport – connecting Bălți with 14 cities of the former USSR with Antonov An-24, Tupolev Tu-134, Let L-410 Turbolet aircraft until 1993. In recent years, the airport is used primarily for domestic flights and occasional external flights.

== History ==
=== Creation ===
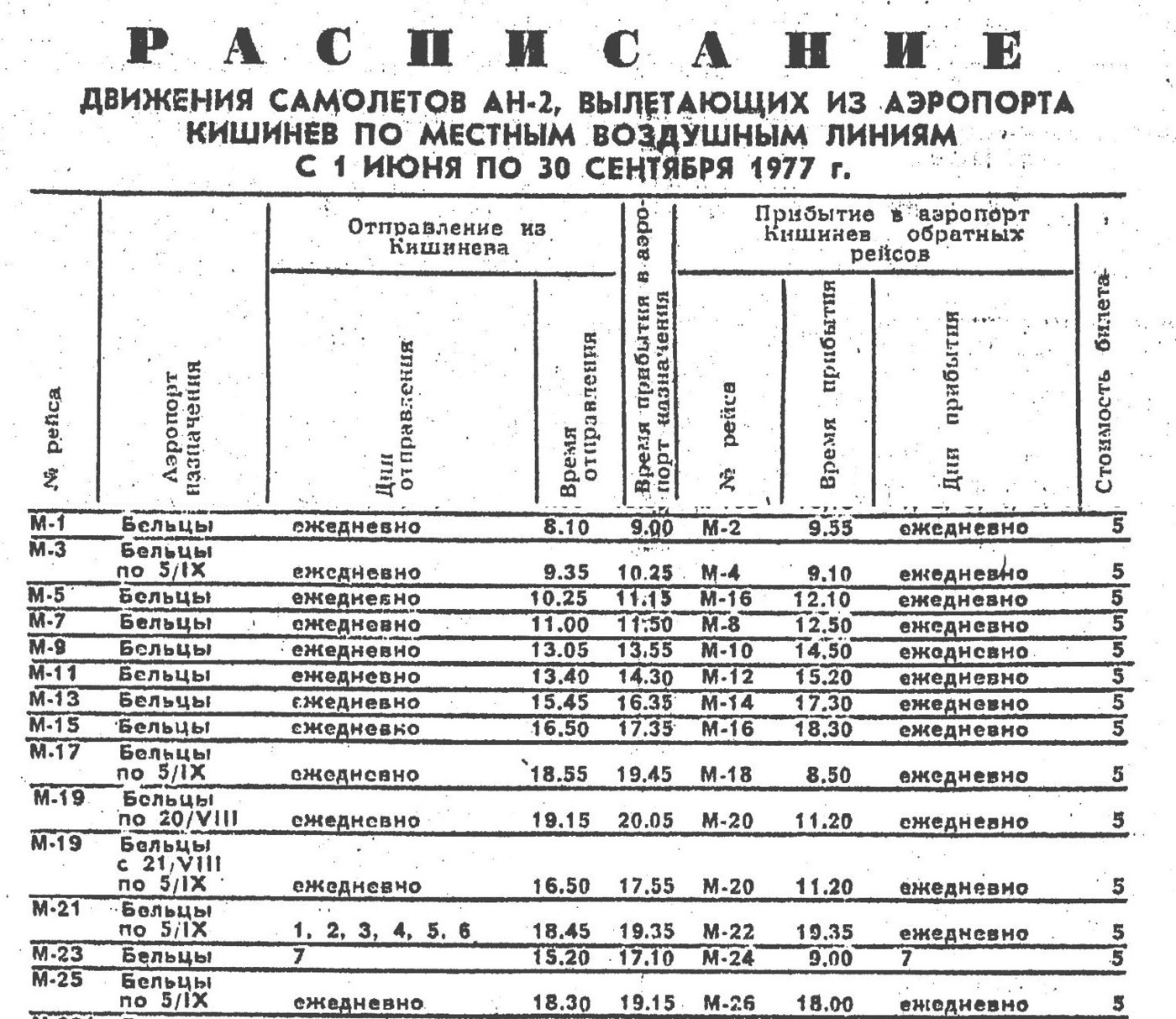
An extract of a 1977 flight schedule from Chișinău to Bălți. The number of flights to Bălți (Bălți City Airport) from Chișinău is 7 times higher than to any other local destination

Before the opening of Bălți International Airport, the main airport in Bălți and the second largest airport in the MSSR was Bălți City Airport, which served regular domestic Soviet passenger and cargo flights, as well as domestic flights within Moldova. With the expansion of civil aviation in the former Soviet Union since the 1960s and the operation of jet aircraft such as the Tupolev Tu-134 in 1969 in Moldova, only Chișinău Eugen Doga International Airport in the Republic of Moldova was able to serve regular passenger flights by jet aircraft. Although the number of domestic flights on the domestic Bălți – Chişinău route was seven times higher than on any other local route, and in Moldova, except for Chişinău Airport, intra-Soviet scheduled flights were operated only from Bălți City Airport, the limitations of Bălți City Airport became evident as its airport facilities were insufficient to meet the growing demand for jet air transportation: both runways of Bălți City Airport were too short, the surface type (soil/grass) was inappropriate and the passenger terminal was not ready to cope with the increased number of passengers on scheduled jet flights.

The design of a new airport for Bălți and the north of Moldova began in 1974. Before the construction of the runway, 146 hectares of chernozem/ploughland were expropriated from the collective farm (kolkhoz) "Leadoveni", near the village of Leadoveni. The choice of the location of the most recent runway built from scratch in the Republic of Moldova was made carefully, taking into account the then modern technical and engineering means and, in particular, the wind rose direction and lack of stable fog at the Bălți International Airport runway site, the highest altitude: 231 metres above sea level.

==== Altitude and visibility ====
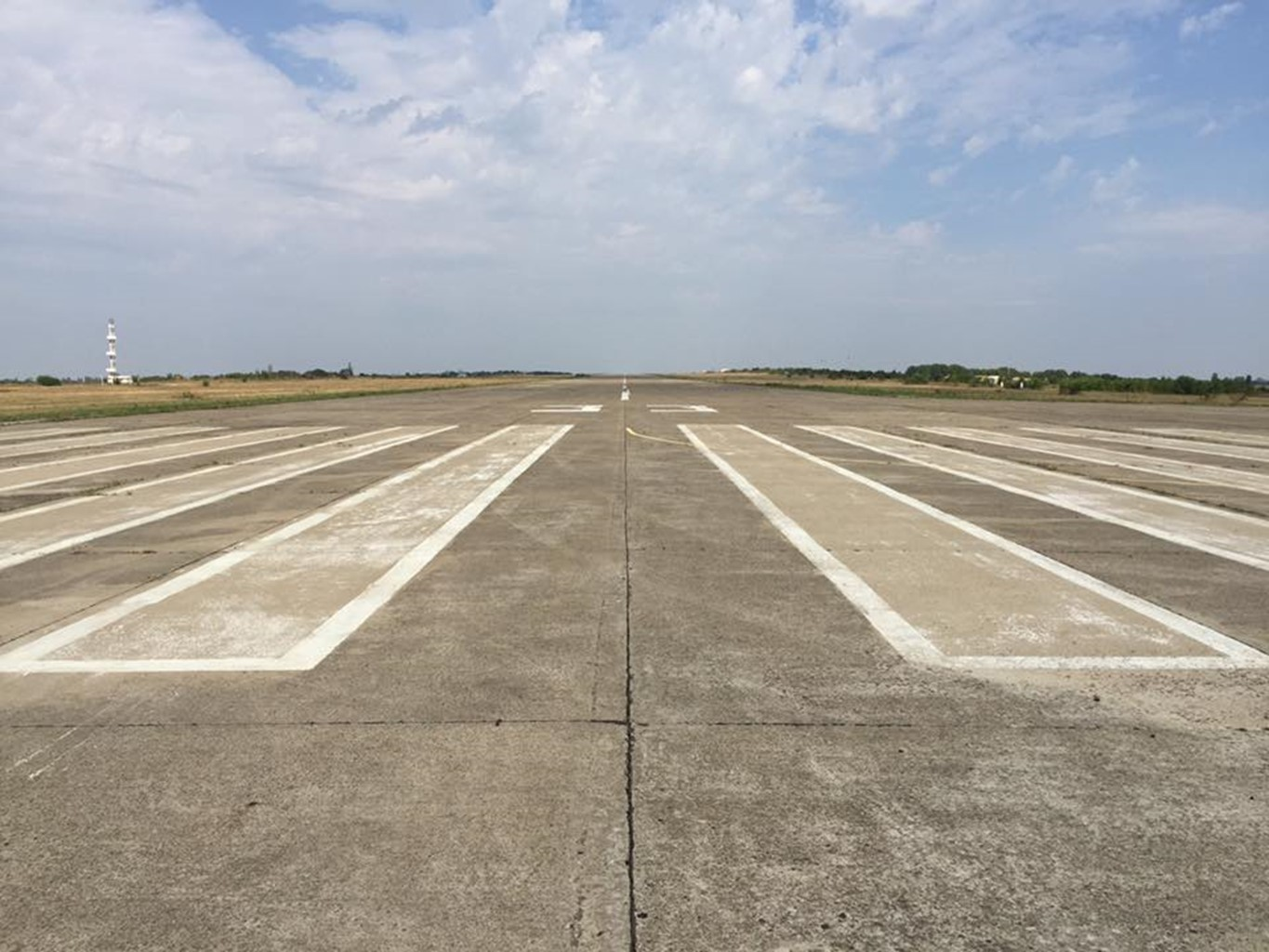
Runway of Bălți-Leadoveni International Airport – heading 33°

The runway altitude at Bălți International Airport is 231 meters at the end of the runway with heading 15° and 215 meters at the end of the runway with heading 33°. This runway altitude is the highest and provides the best visibility compared to all other airports and airfields in the region.

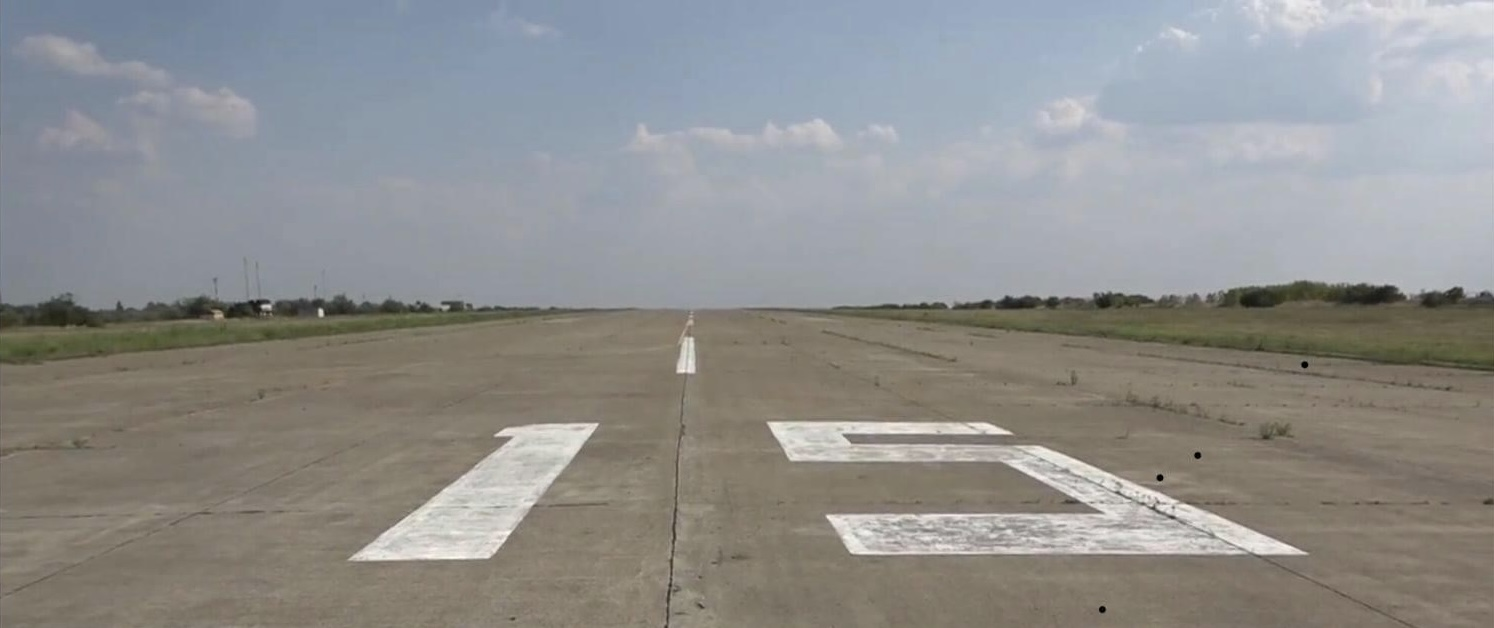
Runway of Bălți-Leadoveni International Airport – heading 15°

Unlike other airports in Moldova and in the region, the Bălți International Airport can operate in any weather conditions. The runway at Bălți International Airport is at an absolute altitude of 231 metres (758 ft), with surrounding valleys descending to 100 metres (330 ft), which contributes to quick dissipation of fog.

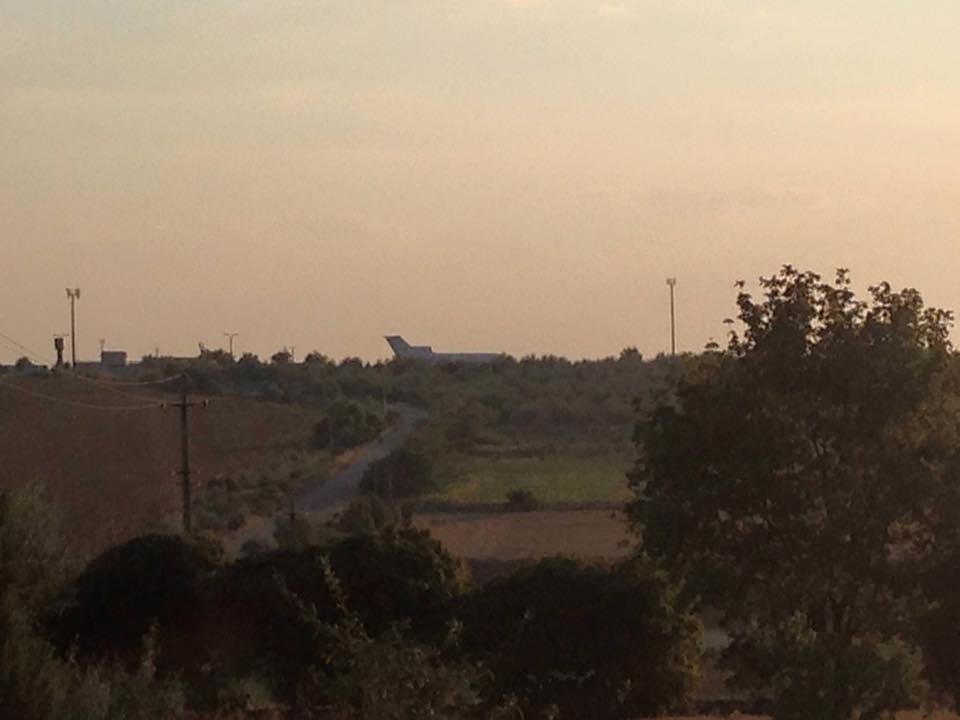
View of Bălți International Airport, on the top of the 231m high hill, from the M5 highway

Chişinău Airport the runway is situated at a height of 115 m and surrounded by hills 250 m high, resulting in Chisinau airport being closed several days a year due to persistent fog. The same situation applies to the runway of the military airfield of Marculesti, which is situated at a height of 101 m and surrounded by hills above 300 m – which contributes to the persistent fog in Marculesti.

==== Soil quality ====
Soil at Bălți International Airport is not subject to soil erosion, while Chișinău Eugen Doga International Airport and Marculesti military airfield are subject to soil erosion processes.

==== Wind rose ====
The prevailing wind directions in the Republic of Moldova are N, NE, NW, S and SE.

An anemometer of the reference station located near Bălți International Airport (open place at 200 metres (660 ft) above the ground, slightly screened with a low roughness coefficient) revealed the highest average annual wind speed in the Republic of Moldova at Bălți International Airport (followed by Cahul International Airport) compared to the locations of other airports and airfields in Moldova. Both wind speed and Weibull distribution in these studies confirm the correspondence of wind direction at the runway location of Bălți International Airport with the heading of the runway: NV/SE = 15'/33', thus always providing the necessary wind for take-off or landing in the right direction, without the headwind that often occurs at Chișinău Airport and at the military airfield of Marculesti, each with a runway oriented east–west, which often leads to headwinds at Chisinau Airport. In the Republic of Moldova, apart from the three runways oriented in accordance with the prevailing winds at 1) Bălți International Airport (magnetic heading 15° northwest/33° south-east) and at Bălți City Airport (2) magnetic heading 13° northwest/31° south-east and 3) magnetic heading 01° southwest/19° north-east), only Cahul Airport (magnetic heading 16° northwest/34° south-east) has a runway oriented in accordance with the prevailing winds.

Moreover, among cities with active airports in the Republic of Moldova, the average wind speed in Bălți (2.7 m/s) measured in the period 01/1990 – 12/2011 at an altitude of 101 metres (331 ft) (latitude 47.77462 – longitude 27.95065 corresponds to the runway altitude of Bălți City Airport 47°46′28.6″N 27°57′02.3″E, Bălți International Airport being located at an altitude of 231 metres (758 ft)) is also higher than in Chişinău (2.28 m/s at an altitude of 173 metres (568 ft) – the altitude of the Chişinău airport is lower: 122 metres (400 ft)). The wind speed in Cahul – 3.71 m/s at 196 metres (643 ft) altitude (Cahul Airport is 199 metres (653 ft)-209 metres (686 ft) meters).

==== ICAO and EASA civil aviation safety requirements ====
The positioning of the runway of Bălți International Airport in such a way that the landing and take-off route bypasses the city of Bălți complies with the civil aviation safety requirements established by the International Civil Aviation Organization (ICAO), namely Article 3.1.2 (Minimum Altitudes) of Chapter 3 (General Regulations) of Annex 2 (Flight Rules) of the Convention on International Civil Aviation and the European Aviation Safety Agency (EASA), namely Article SERA.3105. (Minimum Altitudes) to Chapter 1 (PROTECTION OF PERSONS AND PROPERTY) of Section 3 (GENERAL RULES AND CONTROL OF COLLECTION) of the Annex to the Standardised European Air Traffic Regulations (SERA) which states that aircraft must not fly over congested areas of cities, towns or populated areas or over crowded open-air areas. Therefore, no inconveniences were observed during the operation of Bălți International Airport, even when flights were operated by Tupolev Tu-134, one of the noisiest aircraft, popularly called the "whistle".

In this context, attempts to operate several irregular flights with medium-sized aircraft from the military airfield in Marculesti (with ground handling and air navigation personnel being driven in for each landing/takeoff to Marculesti from Balti, since not available at the airfield in Marculesti) caused numerous scandals and panic among residents of Bălți. The runway of the military airfield of Marculesti, oriented directly towards the city of Bălți from the east towards the west (direction of border with Romania), was built for light and manoeuvrable military aircraft so that such aircraft could bypass the city on a take-off/landing path that medium and heavy aircraft cannot do.

==== Name ====
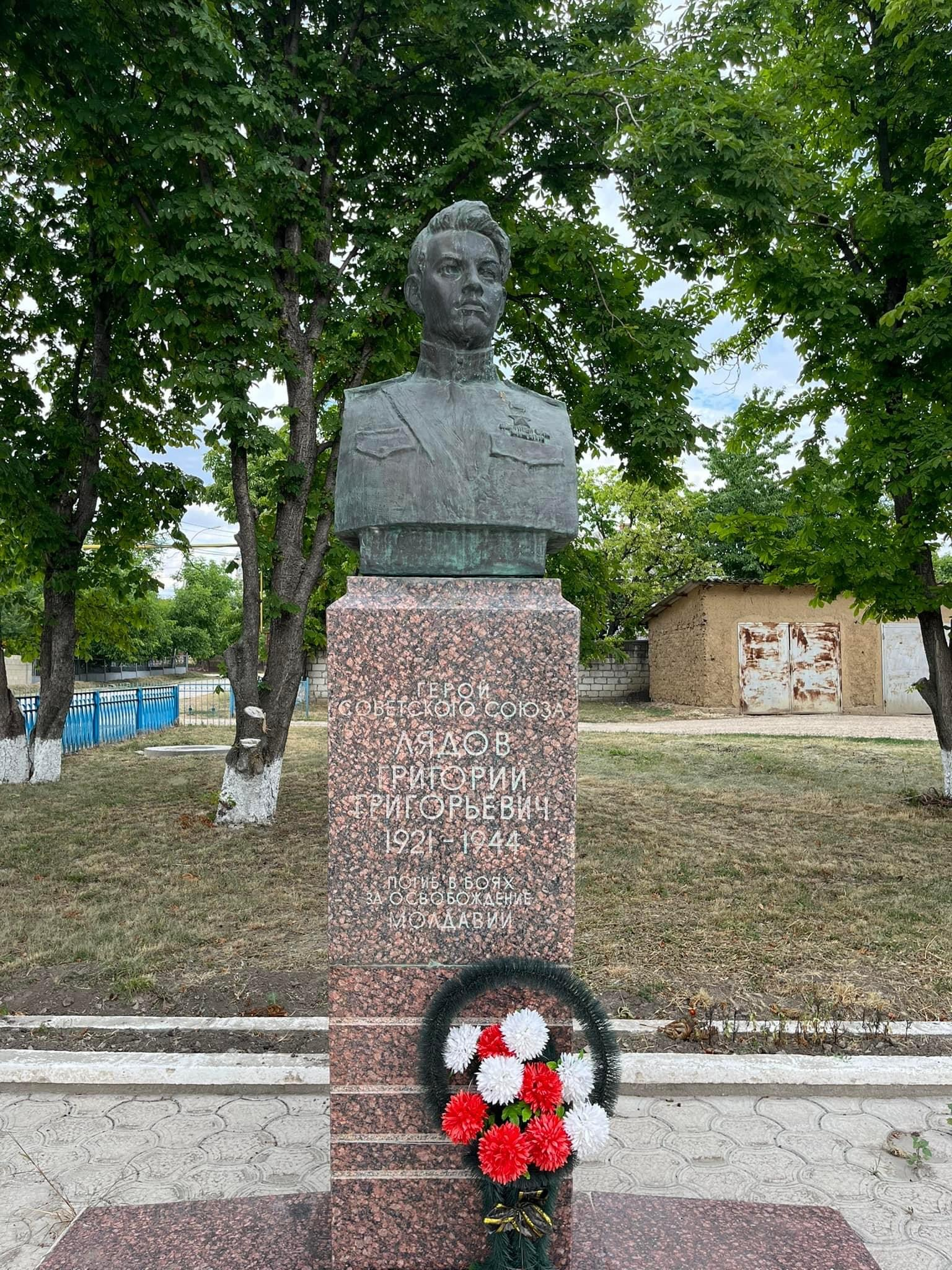
Monument to Grigori Leadov in Singureni, opposite the town hall of Singureni

The name of the Bălți-Leadoveni airport comes from the old name of the former village of Leadoveni (Corlăteni), into which the villages Singureni and Corlăteni were merged in 1966. The name Leadoveni was given in 1945 to the village of Corlăteni (also called Strymba) in honour of Grigori Lyadov, who, during an aeroplane crash, steered the falling plane away from the houses in Singureni and Corlăteni villages. A monument has been erected at the site of his death in Singureni. The Balti Leadoveni airport is now located on the territory of the village of Corlăteni. During World War II, the territory of Singureni village was the main military airfield in Moldova: the Bălți-Singureni airfield. It was home to IAP 55 (later named IAP 16) from Kropyvnytskyi with 5 advanced airfields in the Moldavian SSR and the Ukrainian SSR. Also during World War II, Kampfgeschwader 27 and Kampfgeschwader 51 from Landsberg am Lech formed from Kampfgeschwader 255 were stationed at the airfield in Singureni.

After the independence of Moldova in 1991, the two villages were again separated and returned to their former names, as they were historically: Corlăteni and Singureni. In recent Moldovan legislation, the civilian international airport in Corlăteni is called Bălți International Airport.

=== Technical certification ===
The Kyiv institute Aeroproject prepared the entire design documentation for the new airport, while the Moscow institute Aeroproject certified the airport and, in particular, proceeded to certification of the artificial surfaces of the aerodrome.

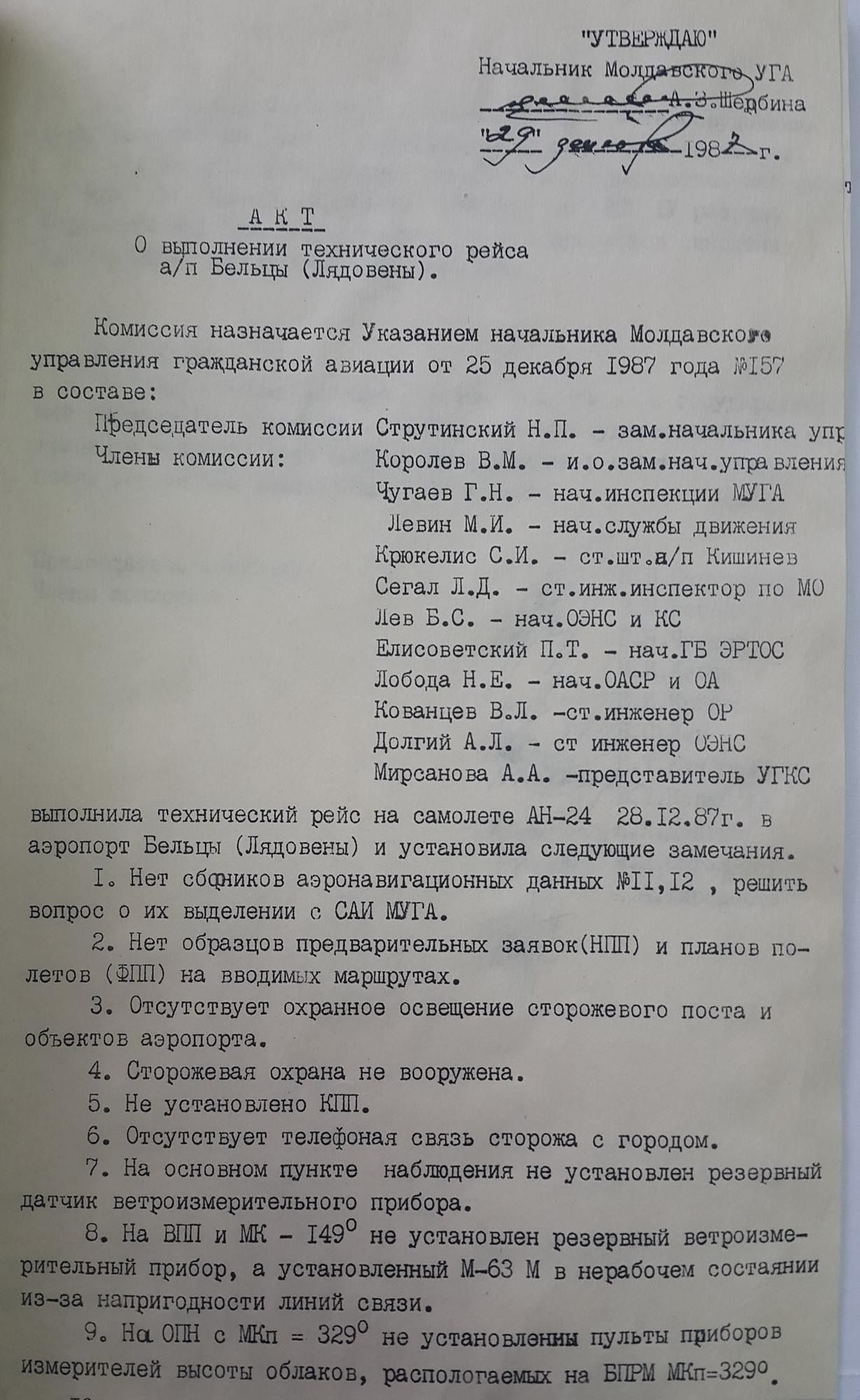
The deed establishing operation first technical flight Antonov An-24 at Bălți-Leadoveni Airport on 28 December 1987

The first technical flight on the new Bălți aerodrome was performed on 28 December 1987 by the Antonov An-24 aircraft, by representatives of the Testing Commission of Moldovan Civil Aviation Authority.

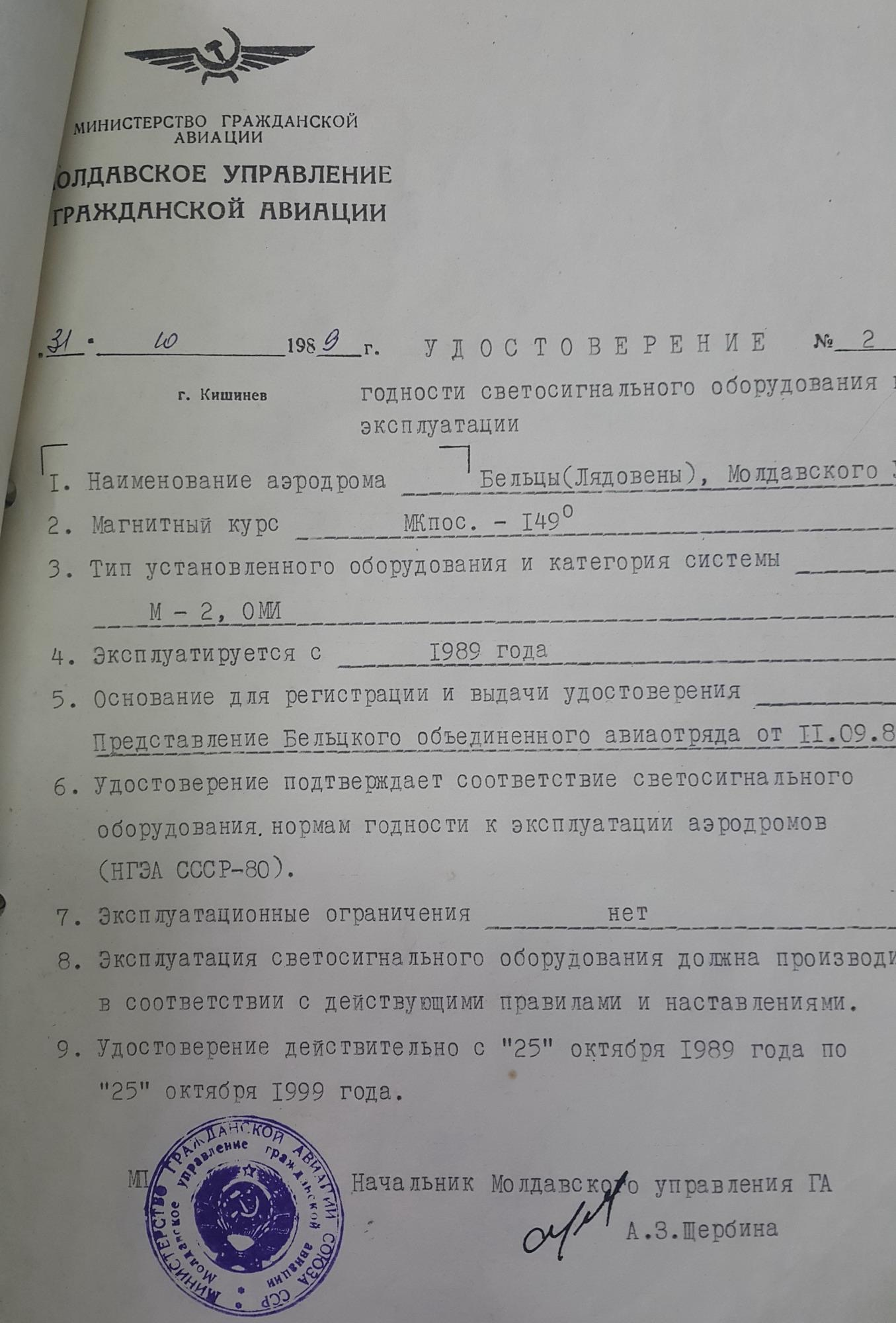
Certificate of conformity of lighting and signalling equipment at Bălți-Leadoveni airport

On 31 October 1989, authorities established the conformity of the high-intensity runway lights (HIRL) installed at the Bălți-Leadoveni airport.

On 22 February 1990, the Moscow-based State Design and Prospecting Research Institute for Civil Aviation "Aeroproject" confirmed the pavement classification number and indicated the aircraft which may be operated at Bălți-Leadoveni with no restrictions: Il-18, Antonov An-12, Yakovlev Yak-42, Tupolev Tu-134.

On 8 June 1990, USSR Ministry of Civil Aviation issued Bălți-Leadoveni Certificate No.190 of state registration and aerodrome suitability, confirming the registration of the aerodrome in the USSR State Register of Civil Aerodromes, aerodrome class "B", runway dimensions 2240x42m, 24 cm cement concrete surface type, day and night operation all year round, equipment with non-directional beacons (NDB) as part of the instrument landing system (ILS) on 2 directions, as well as precision approach radar system (PAR) and low intensity runway lights (LIRL) on 2 directions, without weather minima of ICAO landing categories, the ability of unlimited operation of aircraft Tupolev Tu-134, Antonov An-24, Yakovlev Yak-40 and other types of aircraft of class III^{rd} and IV^{th}, as well as any types of helicopters. The technical certificate was approved by Moldovan Civil Aviation Authority on 4 May 1990. The technical flight certificate (operated with Tupolev Tu-134) was approved by Moldovan Civil Aviation Authority on 29 May 1990, pursuant to the order of Moldovan Civil Aviation Authority No.112 of 29 May 1990.

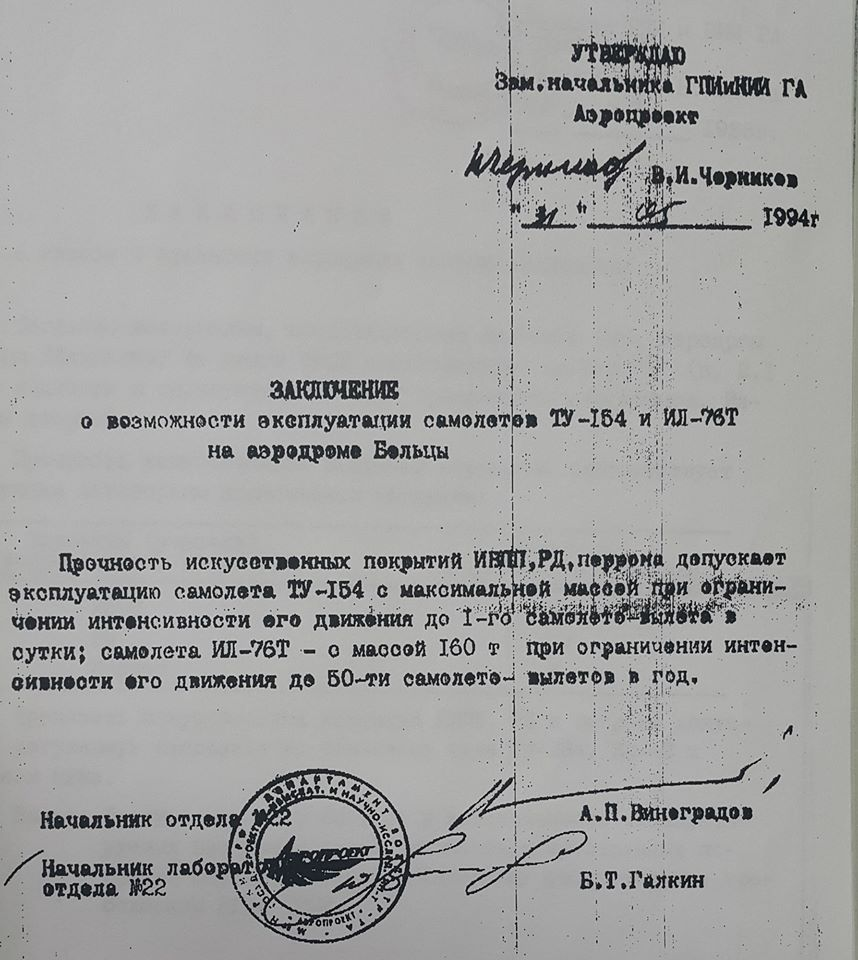
Certificate confirming the operation of Bălți-Leadoveni Airport with Tu-154 and Il-76T aircraft

On 31 May 1994, Moscow based State Design and Prospecting Research Institute for Civil Aviation "Aeroproject" confirmed also the capacity of Bălți-Leadoveni airport for operation of Tupolev Tu-154 (one plane per day) and Ilyushin Il-76 (50 planes per year with weight of 160 tonnes (350,000 lb)).

Although intra-Soviet flights have been operated from the airport since its inception, following the collapse of the USSR and Independence of Moldova, on 4 April 2002 the Government of Moldova granted international status to the new Bălți airport.

== Facilities ==
The airport was built in the 1980s and at the time it met basic Soviet standards and was actively used by Aeroflot. Aircraft such as An-24, An-26, Yak-42, Tu-134, as well as Tu-154 and Il-76 could land at the airport. There were projects for the construction of two terminals, a modern passenger terminal and a cargo terminal, an air navigation control tower instead of temporary structures, a hotel complex, a residential area for civil aviation workers, the construction of a trolleybus line from Bălți to the airport, but they have not been implemented yet.

Bălți International Airport is designed to operate 24 hours a day, seven days a week, all year round and includes an international passenger terminal (consisting of two buildings: one for departures, the first for arrivals), which has been in a pristine condition since its construction, although the existing facilities were considered temporary in 1987/1989.

The runway at Bălți International Airport is the last runway built from scratch of reinforced concrete – the second runway of reinforced concrete in the Republic of Moldova after the runway at Chisinau airport. For example, at the military airfield in Marculesti, the runway is assembled from concrete slabs whose joints are not strong, leading to unevenness of these slabs and the damaged nature of the runway and, consequently, to a call by the former director of this airfield in Marculesti to close it.

The geographical location of the runway at Balti International Airport was chosen in accordance with the latest air navigation standards and has the same magnetic orientation (north 15, south 33) as several international airports in the region and the world. The magnetic bearing of the runway of Balti International Airport is 15° north-west / 33° south-east. The runway is 2,240 m long and 42 m wide. The land around the runway has been prepared from the beginning for its extension.

The all-weather runway is ensured by an elevation of 231 metres above sea level and surrounding valleys up to 100 metres high, which ensures that there are no conditions for sustained fog formation, also taking into account the wind rose at this particular location. During metrological observations it was found that when runways of nearby airports and airfields (Chișinău, Iași, Bucharest, Mărculești, Odesa and Kyiv) are closed for operation or have reduced visibility, the runway of Balti Lyadoveni airport remains operable with sufficient visibility, both horizontal and vertical.

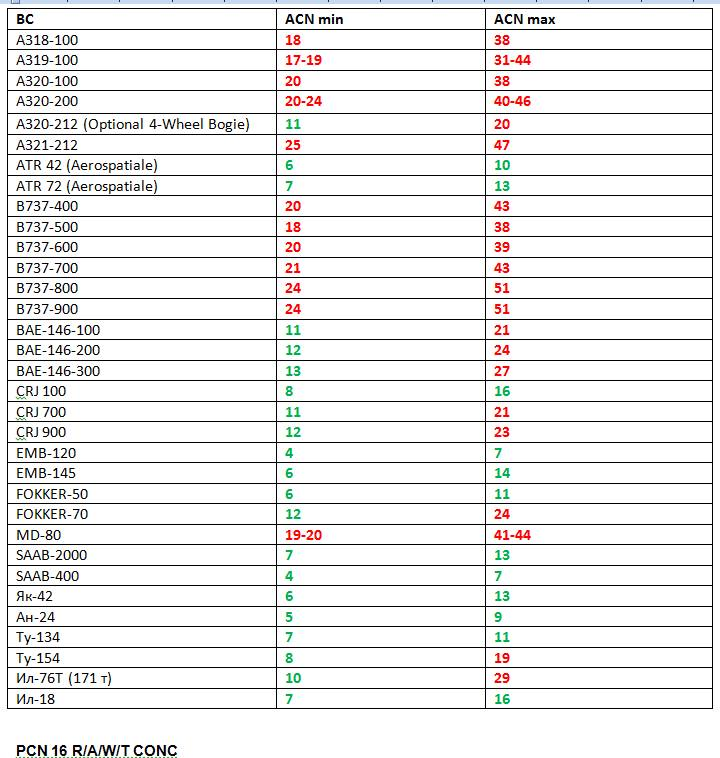
Table of correspondence of ACN-PCN method in relation to the runway at Bălți Leadoveni airport

Pavement classification number: PCN 16 R (rigid construction) / A (the strongest class is CBR 15 (all CBR above 13%) of the base strength under the road surface / W (unit expressing the maximum tyre pressure the road surface can withstand, W (unlimited) – no tyre pressure limit) / T (description of method by which the first value was obtained): T denotes technical grade) CONC (concrete).

In accordance with the Decision No 32 of the Court of Auditors of Moldova of 25 May 2007, Bălți International Airport has been declared compliant with ICAO requirements.

In accordance with the action plan report dated 1 March 2013, established as part of an inspection carried out by the Moldovan Civil Aviation Authority, the following services were inspected at Bălți-Leadoveni Airport: passenger and baggage service, general services, ticket office and air terminal, passenger transportation, baggage service.

In accordance with a press release published in December 2015 by the former Moldovan Ministry of Transport and Road Infrastructure, Bălți International Airport is located in the Rîșcani District, covers an area of 144.5567 hectares (14,455.67 a) and includes the aerodrome, passenger terminal, baggage handling facility, buildings and facilities providing the technological process (metal hangar, diesel-electric generator for stand-by reserve, area in front of the passenger terminal, parking spaces for special ground vehicles, etc.), as well as an area that could be used for the development of infrastructure at the Bălți International Airport.

== Access and ground transport ==
Bălți International Airport is located in the northern part of Moldova, near the city of Bălți, one of the five Moldovan municipalities, outside the Bălți city limits, on the territory of the village of Corlăteni in the Rîșcani District, 15.1 kilometres (9.4 mi) from the centre of Bălți (9.7 kilometres (6.0 mi) north of the northern outskirts of the city, where Dacia district ends), with direct access to the European route E583/M5 highway and Republican Road R12.

=== Public transport ===
==== Train ====
Bălți International Airport is close to three railway stations: 12.4 kilometres (7.7 mi) (16 minutes by car) from the Pelinia railway station, 15 kilometres (9.3 mi) (19/17 minutes by car) from Bălți Northern railway station and 15.6 kilometres (9.7 mi) (18 minutes by car) from Bălți Western railway station. There is no train station directly at Bălți International Airport.

==== Trolleybus, bus, and shuttle bus ====
There are no trolleybuses to the Bălți International Airport in Corlăteni from Bălți, despite plans to extend an electrified trolleybus line to this airport and trolleybus lines 1, 3 and 4 run to the second historic Bălți City Airport.

Most buses and minibuses on suburban routes in the Bălți metropolitan area and interurban/inter-district routes, as well as buses on international routes to and from Bălți stop in Corlăteni (4.2 kilometres (2.6 mi) from the airport – 4 minutes by car) or near the flyover bridge with direct access to the airport from the M5 highway (1.3 kilometres (0.81 mi) – 3 minutes by car to the airport).

=== Taxi ===
Taxis are available upon order. There is no permanent taxi stand at the terminal.

=== Car ===
Balti International Airport is 15.4 km (17 minutes' drive) from Bălți city centre. The passenger terminal, where Bălți International Airport is located, can be reached by the European route E583/M5 highway, which continues after the roundabout at the Bălți exit at the end of Decebal Street, and by the Republican Road R12.

=== Bicycle ===
There is no bicycle route to Bălți International Airport.

=== Hotel access ===
The closest hotel to Bălți International Airport is LidoLux (11.4 kilometres (7.1 mi), 11 minutes' drive). Other hotels in Bălți can be reached by public transport from Bălți or by taxi. The first area to enter Bălți from the airport is the Dacia district, which is connected by public transport and taxis to various parts of the city.

== Operator ==
Balti International Airport is managed by the State Enterprise Moldaeroservice and covers an area of 144 hectares (14,400 a).

From an administrative point of view, the airport depends on geographically competent local authorities: in general on the Government of Moldova, in the field of urban planning permissions and land management on the district council of Rîșcani District and the mayoralty of Corlăteni village.

The State Enterprise Moldaeroservice was founded in 1966 as the Bălți Flight Unit No. 281 (Бельцкий авиаотряд №281) of the Combined Aviation Unit of Bălți (Bălți CAU), by order of the USSR Minister of Civil Aviation, based on a civil squadron of Yakovlev Yak-12 and Antonov An-2 aircraft. Together with the services of the Bălți City Airport Civil Aviation Regiment, Bălți Air Unit No. 281 formed the Bălți Combined Aviation Unit.

The commander of Bălți Flight Unit No. 281 was appointed Nicolae Zavadschii, the head of the airport – Petru Ovcinicov, the head of the airport technical service base – Victor Șerstiuc and the head of the Combined Aviation Unit of Bălți – Vitalie Bezdenejnîh. Among the commanders of the Combined Aviation Unit of Bălți were: Alexei Lyciman, Yevgeny Ilyakov, Anatolii Bajucov, Alexei Alexeev, Vasilii Burma, Ivan Tomac, Vladimir Rishkov, Valery Cenin. Among the heads of the airport's technical services base were Grigore Rotari, Boris Cabac, Victor Gherta. The air navigation service was headed by Dmitrie Covalciuc, and the passenger service by Maria Ribacova, Alexandr Ojegov, Leonid Solovyov. The airport and ground service was headed by Petru Lobanov, Rașid Biriucov, Dmitrie Gubarev, Vasile Barabaș. Throughout its development, the company went through many stages of restructuring and advancement.

In 1989 the concrete runway was put into operation at the newly built Bălți-Leadoveni International Airport (also managed by Moldaeroservice), thanks to which the passengers from the northern region of the Republic of Moldova gained the possibility of air travel on regular flights to 14 cities of the former USSR with aircraft of the type Antonov An-24, Tupolev Tu-134, Let L-410 Turbolet until 1993.

With the dissolution of the Soviet Union, the airspace control and surveillance service became an independent service, delegated to the Bălți branch of the state enterprise "MOLDATSA".

With the collapse of the USSR, the airspace control and surveillance service became separate and was transferred to the Balti branch of the state enterprise MoldATSA. Order No. 79 of the State Civil Aviation Administration of the Republic of Moldova on the creation of the state enterprise Moldaviaservice.

The Bălți Combined Aviation Unit, which became the Bălți State Aviation Enterprise, which was reorganised and renamed Moldaviaservice State Enterprise on 17 September 1994 and Moldaeroservice in 1996. Moldaeroservice was created on the basis of the Bălți Aviation Enterprise and Bălți branch of the State Airline Air Moldova and is subordinated to the Moldovan Civil Aviation Authority. Thus the company became an autonomous company "Moldaeroservice" with its own budget/balance sheet, having at its disposal: Bălți International Airport (145 ha), Bălți City Airport (136 ha), professional staff, buildings and premises necessary for the technological and production process, An-2 aircraft and Mi-2 helicopters.

In accordance with the Operator Permit No Md 001, issued by the Civil Aviation Authority of Moldova, Moldaeroservice performs the following operations: sanitary flights, observation flights, search and rescue flights, customary advertising and entertainment flights, flights for agricultural and forestry sectors.

In accordance with the certificate MD.145.0025, Moldaeroservice is approved to perform maintenance operations with An-2 (ASH-62IR); Mi-2 (GTD-350); C3; C5; C6; C7; C8; C9; C12; C13; C14; C18.

In accordance with the Decision no.32 of the Court of Auditors of Moldova of 25 May 2007, the management of Balti International Airport was irregular, with inefficient accounting by the management of Moldaeroservice.

Currently, Moldaeroservice operates Bălți International Airport, even though no regular flights are being operated and the operational certificate was withdrawn by Moldovan authorities on 14 October 2015, purportedly for the lack of financing of Moldaeroservice.

As Moldova was experiencing an economic crisis in the 1990s, the re-construction and modernization plans of the airport, as well as the whole aviation industry, were put on hold. Only in the late 1990s and early 2000s, Chișinău Eugen Doga International Airport was modernized, with help from the European Bank for Reconstruction and Development. Chișinău Eugen Doga International Airportt is today the only airport in Moldova operated by regular passenger and cargo routes.

Bălți International Airport is currently used mainly by an irregular charter passenger, and more often by cargo flights. In between rare flights, the runway serves for Moldavian rallies and open-air concerts.

== Destinations ==
=== Perspectives ===
The new role for the Bălți International Airport could be the first hub for low-cost airlines in Moldova, since the only airport which operates, as a monopoly holder, with high airport taxes regular passenger flights remains Chișinău airport.

Approximately one third or more of all passengers on the routes operated by Air Moldova having roughly half of the share of all flights from Chișinău airport come from Bălți and the northern districts of Moldova. Since May 2015 Air Moldova sells flight tickets with destination point BZY providing a bus transfer service from Bălți to Chișinău airport. Started from one bus per day in the beginning, there are three buses per day as of today circulating between Bălți and Chișinău airport and only for Air Moldova flights.

Important development perspectives also appear for Bălți International Airport in the cargo field, which would generate economic growth for the whole northern region of Moldova. The region boasts an 8% annual GDP growth, and real estate investment projects in Bălți by Western European businesses are some of the growth factors.

According to decision No 32 of the Court of Auditors of Moldova dated 25 May 2007, the Balti International Airport was confirmed as corresponding to the ICAO requirements, although irregularly managed with inefficient accounting by the direction of Moldaeroservice

On 30 August 2007, pursuant to the Decision No 987, the Government of Moldova decided to identify and realise measures for economic efficiency of the Balti International Airport (and Cahul airport) in the Republic of Moldova until 2012, to encourage and stimulate investments including the private ones in these airports.

On 29 October 2010, the Government of the Republic of Moldova adopted decision No 983 pursuant to which it obliged the Free Economic Zone of Balti to build real estate assets on the territory of the Balti International Airport in exchange for the real estate assets transferred to the Free Economic Zone of Balti from the former Balti City Airport. No construction works on the territory of the Balti International Airport started as of today, although the Free Economic Zone of Balti already built real estate assets for business purposes on the received land plots of the Balti City Airport.

== Airlines and destinations ==
As of August 2024, there are no regular scheduled flights to and from Bălți International.

== Famous personalities related to history of Balti aviation ==
- Alexander Pokryshkin
- Rudolf Schmidt
- Grigory Leadov
- Reinhard Heydrich
- Grigore Baștan
- Nadia Russo
- Robert Frimtzis

== See also ==
- List of airports in Moldova
- Civil Aviation Administration of Moldova
