= Robert Frimtzis =

American author (1930–2022)

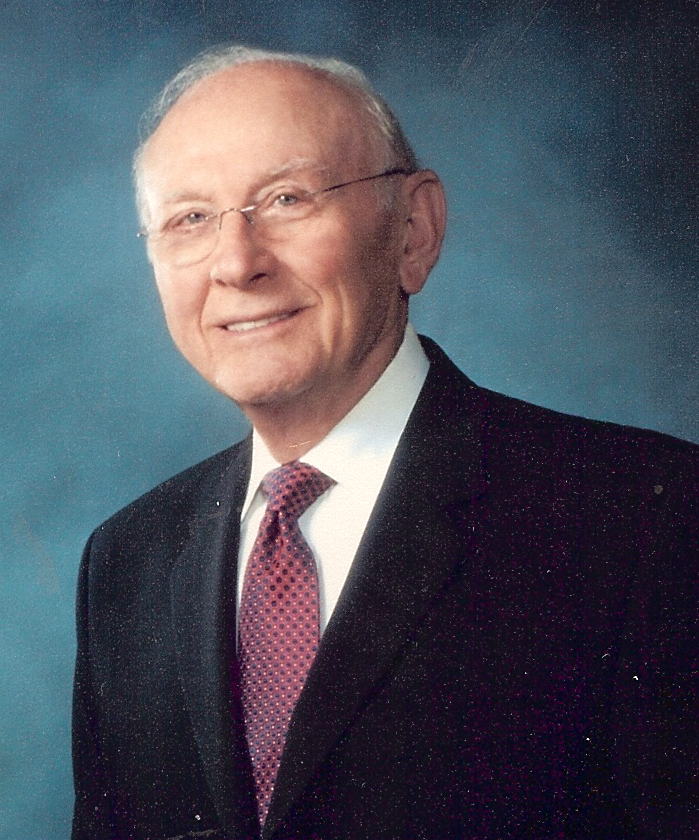
Robert Frimtzis

Robert Frimtzis (September 6, 1930 – December 25, 2022) was a Soviet-born American author who wrote From Tajikistan to the Moon, a memoir of his life in Bălţi, Bessarabia (present-day Moldova).

In June 1941, at the age of eleven, his town was destroyed by the Nazi Luftwaffe. He survived World War II by running 3000 miles across Ukraine, Russia and Uzbekistan to Tajikistan. Hunger forced him to quit school and get his first full-time job at the age of twelve, while his father, mobilized into the Red Army, fought in the Battle of Stalingrad, where he was wounded.

To escape from Soviet anti-Semitism and reach America, Robert illegally crossed from the Soviet Union into Romania, where he unsuccessfully tried to reach Palestine. From Romania into Hungary, then to Austria and Italy, he crossed the Alps twice by foot. In the DP camps in Cremona, Italy, he discovered ORT schools, where he and two others, out of 400 applicants throughout Italy, were accepted into the Central ORT Institute in Anieres near Geneva.

In 1950, after some three years in DP camps, at the age of nineteen, Frimtzis reached America, where he earned a bachelor's degree from CCNY in 1956, and a master’s from Columbia University in 1960, both in electrical engineering, without finishing high school. Subsequently, in various engineering management positions, Robert contributed to the successes of America's space and defense programs.

Frimtzis died on December 25, 2022, at the age of 92.

== Career ==
After his bachelor's degree, Frimtzis gained valuable experience in designing flight simulators for the Boeing 707 and Douglas DC7 airplanes at Curtiss-Wright, Electronics Division. Then at Emerson Radio and Phonograph Co., he performed systems engineering for the Radar Operator Simulator of the Hughes MG-13 Fire Control with the purpose of training radar operators on the F101B fighter plane.

In 1960, Robert Frimtzis was introduced to the newly evolving aerospace industry. At General Dynamics, Astronautics (GDA) in San Diego, California, he headed a study titled Lunar Vehicle Guidance Study, under contract to the Navigation and Guidance Laboratory of Aeronautical Systems Division, Air Force Systems Command. This study was led in conjunction with two other studies. Rendezvous Study performed by MIT Instrumentation Laboratories, and Earth Terminal Guidance and Lunar Landing, by ITT Laboratories. These were early pioneering lunar studies in the area of guidance and trajectory. At the end of the study, Technical Documentary Report ASD-TDR-62-207 dated March 1962, was issued.

In 1962, at North American Aviation (Rockwell) in Downey, California, Robert Frimtzis was engaged in guidance and control studies for advanced systems. Later, as project manager of the Apollo Mission Simulator (AMS), a device being designed for the purpose of training astronauts to fly to the Moon, Robert worked closely with Neil Armstrong, the only astronaut assigned to follow the AMS. He later managed the development of the timelines defining all the activities the three astronauts had to perform in the correct chronological sequence for each lunar Apollo mission.

In 1966 at Hughes Aircraft Company (HAC) in El Segundo, California, Frimtzis was the assistant manager of the Trajectory Analysis Department on the Surveyor program. The department developed the trajectories for all Surveyor spacecraft flights. Additionally, he managed the Liftoff and Translation experiment. It proved that spacecraft engines can be reignited on the lunar surface, a task which was not a Surveyor technical requirement. The Surveyor was the first uncrewed spacecraft to soft land on the Moon. In addition to collecting and analyzing lunar samples, and photographing the surface of the Moon, it proved the principle of soft landing a spacecraft on the lunar surface, and selected the landing corridor for the future Apollo crewed flights.

Later, as the engineering department manager, and assistant laboratory manager of systems engineering for a critical defense satellite program, Frimtzis had responsibility for the design and analysis of all major analytically complex spacecraft functions, such as orbit, and attitude determination, and spacecraft pointing. In addition to being responsible for trajectory analysis and launch vehicle integration, he also managed various studies of advanced defense satellite systems.

In 1978, at TRW, Redondo Beach, California, Frimtzis, as an assistant to the director of systems engineering conducted various advanced system studies. Subsequently, he was the project manager of the Gamma Ray Observatory (GRO), where he was responsible for winning the competitive study and negotiating one hundred million dollar contract to build the huge spacecraft requiring the entire shuttle to launch it into Earth orbit. He was later the project manager of a space laser crosslink system.

In 1984, Robert Frimtzis with his wife, a mechanical engineer, founded in Torrance, California, RFA Associates Inc., a software engineering company, contracting with major aerospace companies like TRW, Hughes, Rockwell, and Northrop. RFA also developed a logistics analysis program called LISA for use by government contractors.

== Book ==
Robert Frimtzis’ memoir From Tajikistan to the Moon - was a finalist in the 2009 San Diego Book Awards, and received Honorable Mention in New York Book Festival, and the Beach Book Festival. His inspirational true story reflects tragedy, survival, and "triumph of the human spirit".

== Sources ==
- Frimtzis, Robert. 2008. From Tajikistan to the Moon: a Story of Tragedy, Survival and Triumph of the Human Spirit. Rancho Santa Fe, CA: Eclipse Publishing.
