= Civil Aviation Authority (Moldova) =

The Republic of Moldova Civil Aviation Authority (CAA; Romanian: Autoritatea Aeronautică Civilă a Republicii Moldova) is the central specialized, executive, coordinating and control body of the Public Administration in the field of civil aviation, founded by the Government of Moldova. The Administration takes decisions of administrative character, approves regulations, norms, instructions and other normative acts obligatory for natural and legal persons who perform their activity in the field of civil aviation.

The agency headquarters are in Chișinău. The agency was formerly the Civil Aviation Administration of the Republic of Moldova (Romanian: Administrația de Stat a Aviației Civile a Republicii Moldova).

The CAA is responsible for the following:

- Issuance of the authorizations for execution of the scheduled and non-scheduled flights;
- Drafting and implementation of the international agreements in the field of civil aviation;
- Control, issuance, validation, suspension and revocation of the Airworthiness certificates of the aircraft and other aeronautical engineering;
- Certification and monitoring of airdromes operation (airports) and of other services, as well as ground systems;
- Performance of the investigations in case of accidents and incidents happened on the territory of the Republic of Moldova (RM) and participation to such investigations in other states, in case the aircraft is registered in the RM;
- Drafting, coordination and implementation of the national aeronautical security program;

Issuance, validation, suspension and revocation of the certifying documents of the aeronautical personnel, air operator certificates (authorizations), aeronautical agent certificates (authorizations), authorization for operation of an air route, certifying documents of the technical means used in the field of civil aviation.

Moldova does not have its own dedicated air accident technical investigation agency. Authorities may form an ad hoc committee or if applicable they may allow a foreign accident investigation agency to do the job.

Some notable leadership includes Mircea Maleca, who's resignation was demanded on June 15, 2016 by prime minister Pavel Filip, and who later went on to found FlyOne.

== See also ==
- Civil aviation authority
- List of civil aviation authorities
