= Corlăteni, Rîșcani =

Corlăteni
- Village
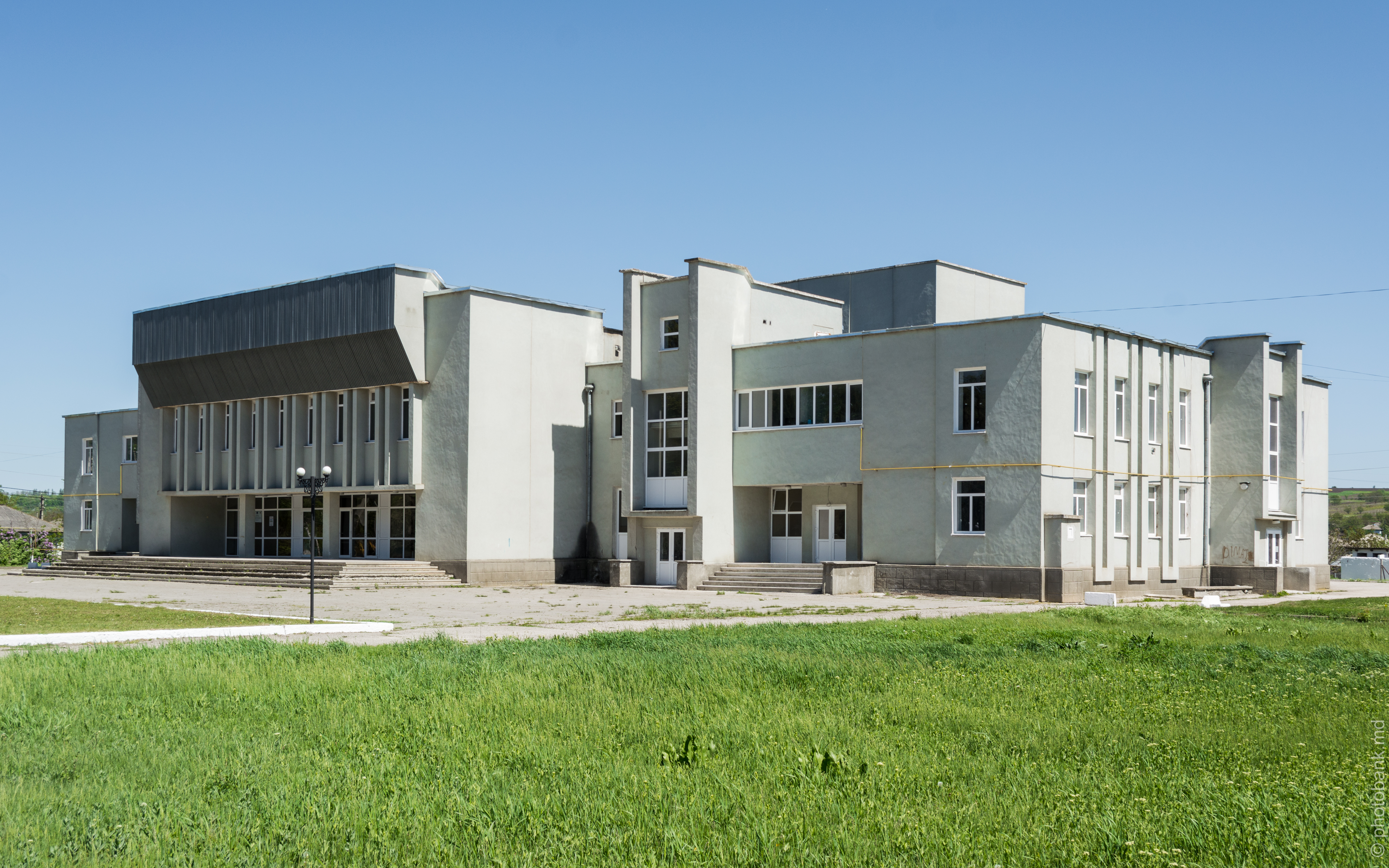
- Local House of Culture

- Location in Moldova
- Coordinates: 47°50′N 27°50′E
- Country: Moldova
- District: Rîșcani District

Population (2014 census)
  - Total: 5,427
- Time zone: UTC+2 (EET)
  - Summer (DST): UTC+3 (EEST)

Corlăteni is a village in Rîșcani District, Moldova. In Corlăteni is located 9 km north of Bălți the second civil international airport of Moldova and one of the two airports of Bălți: Bălți International Airport.

== Notable people ==
- Valentin Guznac
- Valentin Todercan
- Iurie Țurcanu
