= History of Bălți =

History of the third largest city in Moldova

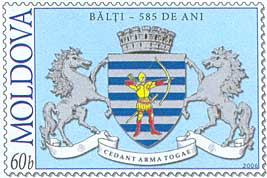
Moldovan postage stamp showing the current coat of arms of Bălți.

Bălți is the second largest city in Moldova. It is located in the northern part of the country, within the historical region of Bessarabia, with which the city's own history is closely intertwined.

== Middle Ages ==
During the European Middle Ages, the fair belonged to Soroca, then after 1785 to the Iași ținut (county) of the Principality of Moldova. Bălți was a crossroad, with post-roads from Iași, Hotin, Soroca, and Orhei intersecting. It soon became a renowned horse fair, and also a cattle fair.

In 1469, a Crimean Tatar invasion led by the khan Meñli I Giray burned Bălți to the ground, before the invaders were defeated in the Battle of Lipnic (about 100 km to the north). The site was rebuilt, though very slowly.

Over the years, Bălți also became a center of handicraft, with smiths, wheelwrights, leather dressers, saddlers, and cartwrights.

== Eighteenth century ==
In 1711, the Moldavian prince Dimitrie Cantemir, who was also a well-known European historiographer and scientist of the time – impressed by the defeat of the Swedish-Polish king Charles XII at the Battle of Poltava (600 km to the east in Ukraine) by the young Russian tsar Peter the Great – invited the tsar to Moldavia in a bold move to try to end Ottoman suzerainty and reclaim the independence of Moldavia. The country formally became a vassal to the Ottoman Empire in 1538; it almost completely preserved its self-rule but needed to pay an ever-increasing annual tribute. During this failed military campaign, Bălți, due to its crossroads location, served as a major headquarters of the Russian army and parts of the Moldavian armies. The town was again burned to the ground: according to one version, this was done as a retaliatory measure by Nohai Tatars; according to another account, the burning was done by the retreating Russians.

The development of the town, as well as of the entire country in the 18th century, suffered because the population had to support the burdens of regular invasions of three foreign armies – Ottoman, Russian, and Habsburg – which clashed in four major wars, pillaged, and performed extensive requisitions to supply their troops. The warring sides sometimes established separate administrations, with each side imposing serfdom-like obligations to provide labor for the movements and encampments of their own armies and exacting punishment when the residents fulfilled these same obligations for the other armies. The last vestiges of serfdom were formally abolished in Moldavia in 1749.

In 1766, the Moldavian prince Alexandru Ghica divided the Bălți estate into two parts, awarding one to the Saint Spiridon monastery of Iaşi and the other to the merchant brothers Alexandru, Constantin, and Iordache Panaiti. Over the next decades, the three brothers improved and developed the locality, settled farmers, and encouraged handicrafts and traders.

Moldavian voevodes built a basilica in the town in 1785. The same year, the land around the city was transferred from Soroca county to Iaşi county, and Bălți was the second largest locality in the county.

== Nineteenth century ==
In 1812 – after a six-year war – the Treaty of Bucharest saw the Ottoman Empire, then Moldavia's suzerain, cede the eastern half of the country (including the town of Bălți) to the Russian Empire, under the name of Bessarabia. Bălți benefited from the division of the Principality of Moldavia along the River Prut in 1812, because although the city of Iaşi remained on the right (west) bank, the largest part of Iaşi County was on the left (east) bank, and Bălți, then with a population of 8,000, gradually became its natural center.

In 1818, the town had serendipitously received formal city rights. According to a popular legend, the Russian tsar Alexander I visited his newly acquired province, and during his passing through Bălți he received news that he had a nephew: the future tsar Alexander II of Russia, had been born. Overjoyed, he granted Bălți official city status, turning it into the administrative center of the county. In 1828, the number of counties of Bessarabia was reduced from twelve to eight, but Iaşi County was preserved, and in 1887 it was renamed Bălți County.

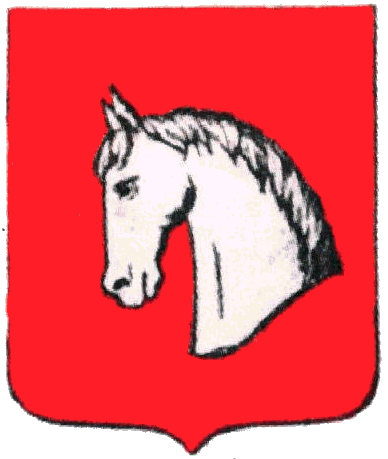
The 1826 Balti coat of arms.

Under Russian rule, the ethnic composition of the city diversified, and its economic development saw people arriving from Austrian Galicia and Russian Podolia, and some also from Russia proper (in particular Old Believers). Some of the new settlers were offered land; others sought freedom of religion, as the western provinces of the Russian Empire – and especially Bessarabia – were more liberal religiously and lacked serfdom. A significant number of Jews (from Galicia – then in the Habsburg Empire) – settled in Bălți; by the end of the century they had become a plurality, and later a majority. At its peak (before World War I), the Jewish community accounted for over 10,000 people, or up to 70% of the population of Bălți. Over time, 72 synagogues were built in the city.

By 1894, the city had become a railroad hub connecting with Czernowitz, Hotin, Chişinău, Bender, Akkerman, and Izmail. The city was a regional center for the collection of wheat and other crops, which were then transported by railroad to Odessa. It also gradually developed into a center of commerce in Bessarabia, primarily dealing with cattle. At the beginning of the 20th century, Bălți was an industrial city with a well-established commerce and many small factories.

== Twentieth century up to 1989 ==
=== World War I period ===
On 1 December [O.S. 18 November] 1917, the city hosted a County Congress of Farmers – the largest of its kind in Bessarabia – which sent representatives to the National Diet (Sfatul Țării).

At the outset of World War I, most men in the region between the ages of 18 and 45 were enrolled in the Russian army, and subsequently self-organized into Moldavian Soldiers' Committees. They became a political force which drove many of the subsequent changes. In October/November 1917, after the dissolution of the Russian Empire, Bessarabia elected its Sfatul Țării, which opened on 21 November / 3 December 1917. The Diet proclaimed the Moldavian Democratic Republic on 2/15 December 1917; formed a government on 8/21 December 1917; proclaimed independence from Russia on 24 January / 6 February 1918; and then united itself with the Kingdom of Romania on 27 March / 9 April 1918 ). One of the city's representatives, a Mr. Trofim, gave a speech at the opening of the Sfatul Ţarii.

Bălți was not affected by World War I, aside from the recruitment and movement of troops.

On 17/30 May 1917, General Shcherbachov, Supreme Commander of the Russian Armies on the Romanian Front, consented to the request of the Moldavian Central Soldiers' Committee of All Bessarabia to form 16 cohorts, made up exclusively of Moldavian soldiers and commanded by Moldavian officers, and distributed them to all the counties of Bessarabia. In September, their number was further increased due to the pillaging and violence caused by deserters from the Russian army passing through the province. Although most of the deserter gangs were small in size, there were also several large ones. Two Cossack regiments remained in Bălți county. Additionally, the leadership of a 3,000-strong infantry detachment in Orhei faltered; this resulted in extensive pillaging of Bălți, Soroca and Orhei counties, with many dead, including several Bessarabian public personalities – an incident which caused an outcry among the inhabitants of the area. The committees of the two regiments stationed in Bălți county adopted resolutions calling for continuous sacking until the soldiers were given discharge papers. In December 1917, when the Directorate General for Armed Forces of the Moldavian Democratic Republic was formed, one of its first units was in Bălți, where the Russian Empire's 478th Druzhina (popular militia unit) – composed almost entirely of Moldavians and led by Captain Anatolie Popa – was nationalized. In March 1918, the Bălți Council of Landowners, along with those of Soroca and Orhei, submitted resolutions to the Sfatul Țării, asking it to consider union with Romania – a request that soon became reality.

=== Inter-war period ===
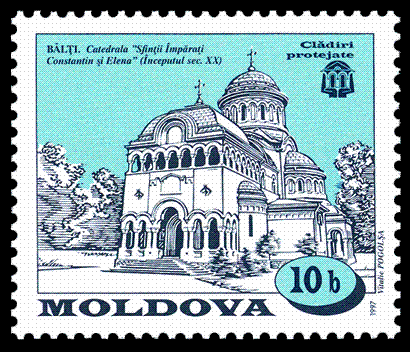
Constantine and Elena Cathedral, depicted on a 1997 postage stamp of the Republic of Moldova.

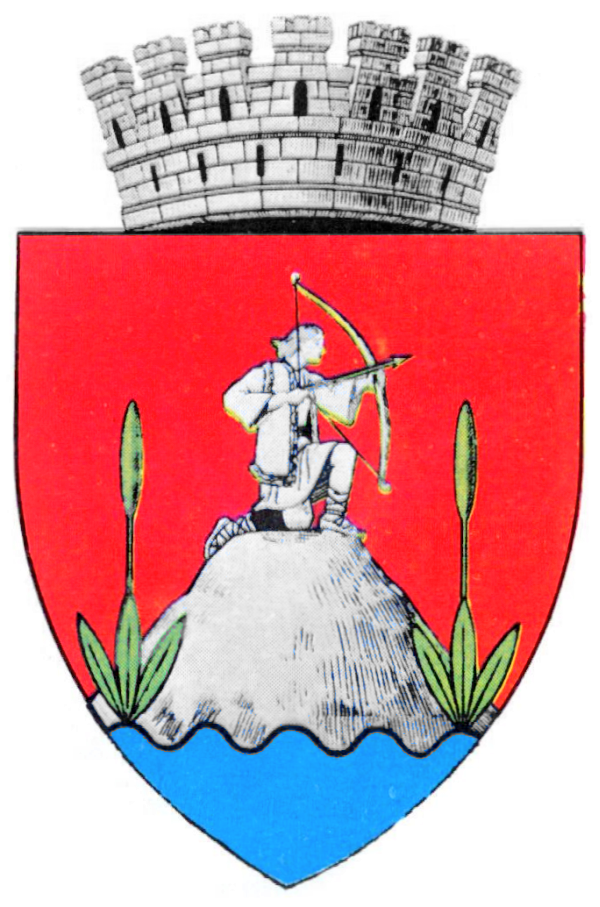
Coat of arms of Bălți during the period between the First and Second World Wars.

The economy of Bălți expanded in the first part of the 20th century, and the town/city started to diversify. Many buildings in Bălți date from the inter-war period.

During the 1920s, the seat of the Bishopric was moved from Hotin to Bălţi. With the effort of Visarion Puiu, construction began on the Bishopric Palace, which was completed in 1933. The Saint Constantine and Elena Cathedral was finished in 1932 and officially inaugurated in 1933, in the presence of the Romanian royal family.

According to the Romanian official census for 1930, Bălți had a population of 30,570, comprising 14,229 Jews, 8,868 Romanians, 5,426 Russians, 981 Poles and 1,066 of other ethnicities. 14,400 of the inhabitants were Christian Orthodox, 14,250 Jewish, and 1,250 Roman Catholic. In that year, the city represented only 7.9% of the population of the surrounding Bălți County (it would be 30% of the same territory today).

By 1940, the city had reached close to 40,000 inhabitants. Approximately 45–46% were Jews, 29–30% were Romanians, and the rest were Ukrainians, Russians, Poles, and Germans.

=== World War II period ===
After the Soviet occupation of Bessarabia and Northern Bukovina in 1940, thousands of former teachers, doctors, office workers, and even better-to-do peasants from northern Bessarabia, thought to be hostile and dangerous to the Soviet regime, were gathered and deported in cattle cars to Siberia. Bălţi, as the most important railroad link in the north, served as a gathering point for this operation. The largest deportation occurred on 12–13 June 1941 from the Slobozia Railway Station. The local economy (numerous small factories and shops) was largely dismantled during the evacuation; several factories and buildings were blown up.

From 22 June to 26 July 1941, the Romanian Army participated in Operation München, an Axis offensive against the Red Army in Bessarabia. After developing bridgeheads across the Prut, the army proceeded with its main advance on 2 July. According to the will of its new ally (Nazi Germany), Romania – now led by a pro-Fascist dictatorship – allotted an 80–km–long segment between its two armies to the 11th German Army, which comprised both German and Romanian units under German command. This portion of the frontline included Bălţi.

The intent was for the city to be conquered by the 14th Romanian Division from the 30th German Corps, supported by the 170th German Division from the 54th German Corps. Soviet units managed to temporarily stop them on 4 July on the eastern outskirts of the town. The 2nd and 3rd Battalions of the 13th Romanian Dorobanți regiment Ştefan cel Mare of the 14th Division maneuvered to the south and took the village of Biliceni and surrounding areas, at which time the 14th Division was transferred to the 54th German Corps.

The German motorized columns and the 1st Romanian Armored Division started to move from bridgeheads on the river Prut, and by 5 July separated the Soviet Army in northern Moldavia (Bessarabia) into pockets of resistance – the largest of which, composed of Soviet 74th Infantry Division, 2nd Mechanized Corps (211th Motorized Division, 11th and 16th Tank Divisions), and cavalry units, was centered at Bălţi. Opposing them were the Romanian 5th and 14th Infantry Divisions, and the German 170th Infantry Division from the German 30th Army Corps. At first the Soviets managed to stop the Romanians and Germans before the village of Răuţel, Bălţi's SW suburb.

The main military actions took part between 7 and 9 July near the villages south of the city. The 8th (Dorobanți) Regiment and the 32nd (Mircea) Infantry Regiment, both from the 5th Romanian Infantry Division, clashed with the Soviet cavalry. Feeling much easier on the ground than the German and Soviet units, they managed to overcome several Soviet strongholds near Zgîrdeşti, Mîndreşti, and the Gliceni Forest. Then, supported by four artillery battalions, the 32nd Regiment attacked Mîndreşti frontally with one battalion and with the second maneuvered to the south, threatening the rear of the Soviet forces, which retreated, leaving much of their heavy weaponry behind.

On 8 July, the 22nd Regiment of the 13th Romanian Division also joined the battle for Bălţi, fighting at Singureni and Ţărinei Hill. The latter, together with the 39th Romanian Infantry Regiment from the 14th Romanian Division, reached the river Răut at 10:00 on 9 July and managed to establish a bridgehead north of Răut, already on the northeastern outskirt of the city. This threatened to encircle the Red Army units in the city, which then hastily withdrew.

Reinhard Heydrich, the chief of the German Reich Security Main Office (German: Reichssicherheitshauptamt), flew several fighter missions in his private modified Bf 109 from the Bălţi-City Airport in July 1941. Heydrich was shot down by Soviet anti-air fire over Ukraine and barely escaped capture after having to swim for his life.

Upon the Axis capture of the city, a 20-strong unit of the German SS Einsatzkommando D murdered about 200 Jews in the city over three days. The majority of the 15,000–strong Jewish population of the city had managed to escape in the previous two weeks. The Soviet authorities organized their evacuation by railway, in cattle cars, to Central Asia, mostly to Uzbekistan. Although the majority survived and returned to the city after the war, their lives as refugees and on the road were harsh, due to the absence of regular supplies or normal housing. In August 1941, there were 1,300 Jews left in Bălţi, and the pro-fascist government of Ion Antonescu decided to deport them. In September 1941, they, together with other Jews from the county, were gathered into two ghettos, in Răuţel and Alexăndreni, with around 3,500 persons in each. In about 10 days, the ghettos were dissolved and the approximately 11,000 Jews were hastily moved, mostly during the night, to a concentration camp in Mărculeşi. After two more weeks, this camp was also disbanded, and the Jews were deported to occupied Transnistria.

This process allowed their persecutors to strip the Jews of most of their belongings, as well as prevent the public from knowing about the true fate of the Jews before everything was accomplished. The Holocaust affected nearly 75,000 Bessarabian Jews, as well as many Bukovinian and Transnistrian Jews; less than one third of the deported Jews survived.

Between 27 February and 2 March 1944, Soviet troops, driving Romanian and German forces westwards, entered the city. West of Bălţi, they first reached and crossed the Soviet border on 22 June 1944.

In the summer of 1944, the Soviets created two POW camps in the city – a small one within the present location of the military base, and a larger one at the southeastern outskirts of the city – by fencing out several blocks of one-story houses. The camps contained up to 45,000 prisoners at a time, most of whom were Romanian POWs. Some prisoners ended up in the camp as late as September–October 1944, after fighting in the Romanian army on the Allies' side, being injured and sent to hospitals close to their homes, and subsequently being arrested by Soviet authorities. In total, about 55,000 persons passed through this camp, comprising about 45,000 Romanians (up to half of which were locals), about 5,000 Germans, about 3,000 Italians, about 2,000 Hungarians, Poles and Czechs.

The concentration camp served as a selection of the most fit labor force, and the conditions inside were very harsh, with most of the prisoners living for months under the open sky, without hygiene and with very little food. It was disbanded in 1945, after the survivors of the winter had been gradually moved to labor camps in the interior of the USSR. In August 1944, when German aviation was regularly attacking the nearby military airport, the Soviets arranged the night illumination of the camp to resemble that of the airport, deceiving the bombers into bombing the camp. The holes produced by the bombs were then used to dump the bodies of the dead.

After the war, the camp was leveled and the resulting field was left to grow over. The spreading of information about the camp was severely prosecuted during Soviet rule. Under perestroika during the 1980s, the city authorities – unaware of the past use of the land – planned to develop the area, but the construction of a new road ran upon one of the mass graves, at which point the workers refused to continue. In 1990, mentions of the POW camp were allowed in the press. A cross was erected for the victims of the camp, since research at the time had led to a large number of locals found among the camps' victims, and an ossuary church is currently under construction.

The Soviet archives preserved considerable information about the POW camps in Bălți, although they were kept secret before 1989. A study in 1992 on a sample of 800 POWs came up with only 13 survivors by 1953.

In the wake of the 1944 Soviet offensive, thousands of people, including many intellectuals, fled to Romania. Like the other localities of Moldova, the city lost most of its pre-war intelligentsia as refugees.

During the spring and summer of 1944, the frontline stabilized along a west–east curve passing 40 km south of the city. After gathering enough forces for a breakthrough (about 1.3 million) and artillery (approximately 370 units per km of frontline) the Red Army penetrated the German-Romanian defenses (approximately 600,000 troops) in the Jassy-Kishinev Offensive, encircling and annihilating a large part of the opposing force. On 23 August 1944, after a royal coup, Romania switched sides and joined the Allies for the rest of the war.

Following the successful offensive, Moldavians of suitable age in the recaptured territories were drafted en masse into the Soviet army, and were not released until 1946.

=== Post-World War II period ===
In 1944, with the return of the Soviet authorities, the policy of political and class persecution resumed, with people deported from northern Moldova to Siberia, the northern Urals, the Russian Far East, and Kazakhstan. The largest of the postwar deportations, "Operation South", occurred on 5–6 July 1949 and included 185 families from the city of Bălți and 161 families from what were then suburbs. Approximately 12,000 Bessarabian families were rounded up and deported as part of this operation. (The population of the city at the time was about 30,000.) Many young people were also enrolled in labor camps throughout the Soviet Union.

An anti-Soviet armed resistance group was active in the city during the Stalinist era. "Sabia Dreptăţii" ("The Sword of Justice") was discovered by the NKVD in 1947, based at the Pedagogical Lycée (former Ion Creangă Lycée) in Bălţi.

The war and the events that followed left a deep impact on the city. Many buildings were leveled or damaged by bombardments and military action. Much of the population was killed, deported, sent to labor camps or ghettos, starved to death, or else fled and did not return. The losses affected all ethnic groups, while the interwar intelligentsia all but disappeared.

During the 1940s and early 1950s, the city lost a significant part of its population to Stalinist repressions (political imprisonment and deportations), Romanian deportation of Jews (the Holocaust), war, the Soviet famine of 1946–1947, and emigration.

After World War II, significant immigration occurred from all over the USSR in a move to rebuild Moldova, develop industry and establish a local Soviet and party apparatus.

In the 1980s, many Moldovans from the northern countryside moved to Bălţi. By the end of the 1980s, most of the Jews of Moldova had migrated to Israel. The Russian- and Ukrainian-speaking group had by then reached 50% of the population of the city, with Moldavian speakers representing the other 50%.

During that time, the regional delegate to the Supreme Soviet of the Soviet Union was the Soviet marshal Sergei Akhromeyev – one of the most pre-eminent hard-liners in the Soviet power system, and one of the close allies of the putchists that attempted to overthrow Soviet president Mikhail Gorbachev in 1991.

In Soviet times, the city claimed several dozen nationalities, with Russian being the dominant public language. From 1940 to 1989, the population of the city increased 4-fold, with the addition of newcomers from all over the USSR, and also of local Moldovans moving from the countryside to the city. The city was further developed into a major industrial center, with the status of a city of republican subordination.

== 1989 to present ==
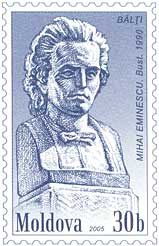
Moldovan postage stamp depicting poet and writer Mihai Eminescu.

During 1988 and 1989 – the most effervescent period in Moldova's recent history – Bălți was known as the "quiet city" of Moldova. Few public demonstrations took place in the city during this period, none gathering more than 15,000. Most citizens, including Moldovans, opposed the drive for establishing Romanian as the only official language of the country.

All local elections were won by the old Soviet apparatus candidates. Municipal activity was conducted in both Russian and Romanian. The city also actively supported Ukrainian language and culture, with approximately 25,000 citizens being Ukrainians.

Following Moldova's declaration of independence in 1991, the rise of nationalist sentiments throughout the country and the economic crisis and unemployment caused by the collapse of the USSR resulted in massive emigration which, coupled with a low birth rate, led to a 23% decrease in the population of Bălţi. Russians and Ukrainians were the most affected ethnic groups, losing 45% and 30% of their 1989 numbers respectively, with the Moldovan population decreasing by 15%. Many inhabitants of the city travelled for seasonal work in, and (less often) emigrated to, Europe, Russia, United States and Israel.

Through all this, Bălţi's tradition of transport-related handiwork was not lost; the city had a number of factories and repair shops for engines and automobiles. The horse's-head coat of arms, though, was replaced with a new one featuring two horses. The city of Bălți entered into a partnership agreement with the French city of Lyon.

In 1994, Bălți gained the status of a municipality.
