= Pirogan =

Pirogan is a surname. Notable people with the surname include:

- Ştefan Pirogan (died 1944), Romanian politician
- Vadim Pirogan (1921–2007), Bessarabian activist and author
