= Fidesco =

Fidesco may refer to:

- Fidesco Group - company
- Fidesco International - Catholic organization
