= Vasile Alecsandri National Theatre =

Vasile Alecsandri National Theatre may refer to:

- Iași National Theatre, founded in 1840, is the oldest national theatre and one of the most prestigious theatrical institutions in Romania
- Bălți National Theatre, which became in 1990 the first national theatre in Moldova
