= Sadovoe =

- Village
- Location in Moldova
- Coordinates: 47°47′N 27°48′E
- Country: Moldova
- District: Bălți

Government
  - Mayor: Serghei Buzurnîi (PSRM)

Area
  - Total: 3.79 sq mi (9.81 km^{2})

Population (2024 census)
  - Total: 972
  - Density: 257/sq mi (99.1/km^{2})
- Time zone: UTC+2 (EET)
  - Summer (DST): UTC+3 (EEST)

Sadovoe is a village in the municipality of Bălți in the north of Moldova. It has an area of 9.81 km^{2} (3.79 sq mi), and had a population of 972 at the 2024 Moldovan census. The distance from Bălți to Sadovoe is around 11 km (6.8 mi).
