= Mihăileni, Rîșcani =

Mihăileni
- Village
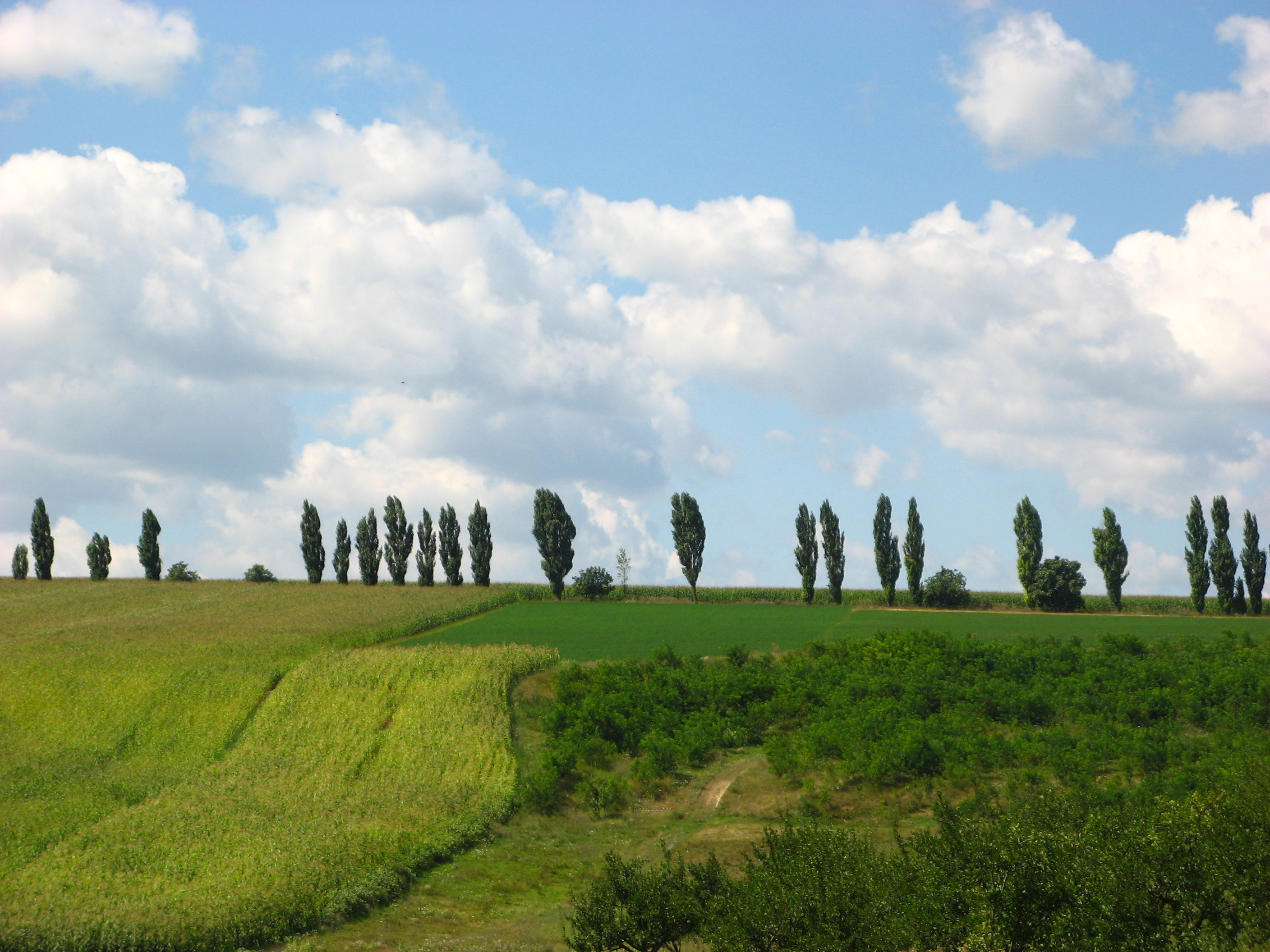

- Location in Moldova
- Coordinates: 48°2′26″N 27°36′50″E
- Country: Moldova
- District: Rîșcani District

Area
  - Total: 2.34 sq mi (6.06 km^{2})

Population (2014 census)
  - Total: 4,225
  - Density: 1,810/sq mi (697/km^{2})
- Time zone: UTC+2 (EET)
  - Summer (DST): UTC+3 (EEST)

Mihăileni is a village in Rîșcani District, Moldova.

== Notable people ==
- Valentin Mândâcanu, writer and politician
- Eugenio Coșeriu, linguist
