= Alexandr Petkov =

Moldovan politician (born 1972)

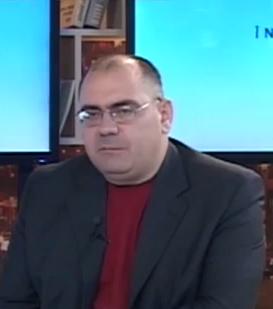
- Petkov in 2015

Mayor of Bălți
- Incumbent
- Assumed office 19 November 2023
- Preceded by: Nicolae Grigorișin

Member of the Moldovan Parliament
- In office 28 November 2010 – 9 December 2014
- Parliamentary group: Party of Communists

Foreign Policy Advisor to the President
- In office 11 February 2004 – 9 September 2004
- President: Vladimir Voronin
- Preceded by: Eugenia Chistruga

Personal details
- Born: 27 November 1972 (age 53) Ciobalaccia, Moldavian SSR, Soviet Union (now Moldova)
- Party: Party of Communists of the Republic of Moldova
- Education: Moldova State University; National University of Political Studies and Public Administration

Alexandr Petkov (born 27 November 1972) is a Moldovan historian and politician. He served as a Member of the Moldovan Parliament from 2010 to 2014. He has served as mayor of Bălți since 2023. In 2024, his deputy was arrested by a special police unit for accepting a bribe of 200,000 euros.
