= Dacia, Bălți =

Neighborhood in Bălți

Dacia
- Neighborhood
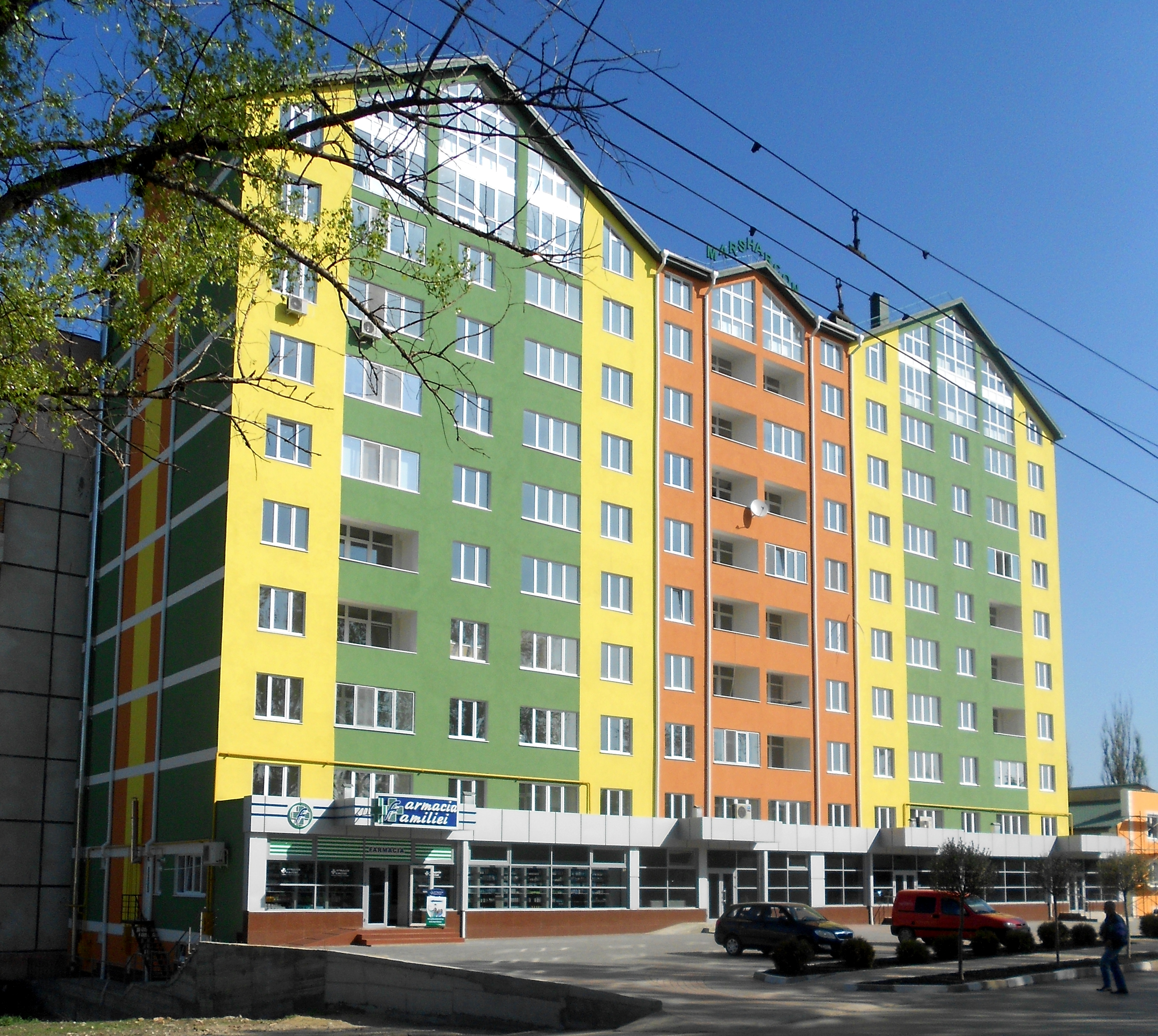
- Residential building in BAM/Dacia
- Interactive map of Dacia
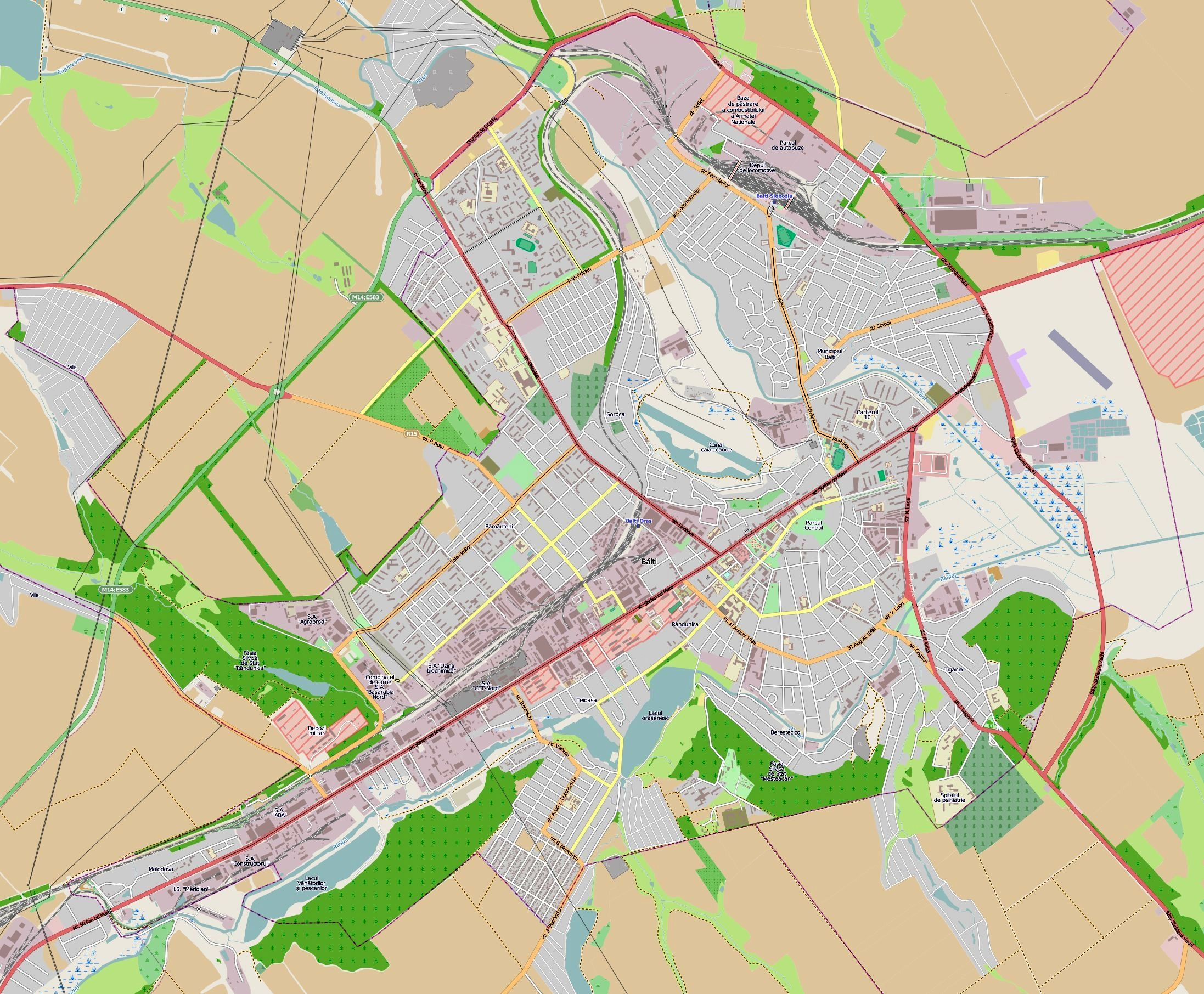
- Location in Bălți
- Coordinates: 47°47′4″N 27°53′37″E
- Country: Moldova
- District: Bălți
- Time zone: UTC+2 (Eastern European Time)
  - Summer (DST): UTC+2 (EET)
- ZIP Codes: 3121

Dacia is a neighborhood in the municipality of Bălți in the north of Moldova. It has a completed housing complex with an integrated complex of service objectives. The construction of the neighborhood started in the early 1970s with the erection of the first 5 blocks of flats, which were the basis of the neighborhood.

In 1975, the Bălți Executive Committee named the new district Okteabriskoe in honor of the October Revolution, but in the early 1990s the district was renamed Dacia, in reference to the Roman province of Dacia. Settling on the outskirts of the city, people needed first of all kindergartens, schools, shops and other institutions. Kindergarten no. 37 started operating in February 1976. During the same period, on the current Konev Street, the Polytechnic Technician (Polytechnic College) and the Vocational School no. 1. A developed infrastructure has been created in this neighborhood for 40 years. Of the public institutions located in the neighborhood, the most important are: the Center for Preventive Medicine, the Department of Production and Operation of the Housing Fund, and the Center for Temporary Placement and Rehabilitation of Children. Most of the vocational secondary and secondary education institutions in Bălți such as the Polytechnic College, the College of Light Industry, and several vocational schools, are concentrated in the Dacia neighborhood.

The population of Dacia reaches about 32,300 people. The housing stock of the neighborhood is represented by 5 and 9 story blocks.
