= Bleșteni =

- Commune
- Location within Edineț
- Coordinates: 48°7′0″N 27°13′9″E
- Country: Moldova
- District: Bleșteni
- Elevation: 211 m (692 ft)

Population (2014)
  - Total: 1,567
- Time zone: UTC+2 (EET)
  - Summer (DST): UTC+3 (EEST)
- Postal code: MD-4615

Bleşteni is a commune in Edineţ district, Moldova. It is composed of two villages, Bleşteni and Volodeni. Bleşteni is the smaller of the two.

== Notable people ==
- Riorita Paterău, member of parliament
