= Eugène Fidler =

Russian-born French painter and ceramicist (1910–1990)

- Born: 13 January 1910; Beltsy, Bessarabia Governorate, Russian Empire (now Moldova)
- Died: 30 September 1990 (aged 80); Roussillon, Provence-Alpes-Côte d'Azur, France
- Education: Ecole des Beaux Arts; Académie Julian
- Occupations: Painter; ceramicist
- Spouses: Edith Giler (m. 1940; div. 1950) Edith Ramos (m. 1956)
- Children: 2

Eugène Fidler (13 January 1910 – 30 September 1990) was a Russian-born French painter and ceramicist. Fidler belongs to the group of ceramicists who worked in the era called the « Golden Years of Vallauris », and he is also known as a painter, for his collages and water colours. His works have been purchased by collectors all over the world. He also showed them in France and abroad.

== Biography ==
Fidler was born on 13 January 1910 in Beltsy, Bessarabia Governorate (present-day Bălți, Moldova) to a Bessarabian-Jewish family. The family moved to Warsaw where his younger sister, Aline, who was to become a pianist was born in 1917. In 1918 his family came as refugees and settled in Nice, France. From 1918-1928 he attended primary and secondary schools in Switzerland and Germany, and then the Lycee Massena in Nice. From 1928-1930 Fidler served his military service in the French Army, thus becoming a French citizen. From 1930–1937 he studied art at the Ecole des Beaux Arts, and later at the Académie Julian. In 1937 he returned to Nice, following the death of his father, Aron Fidler. In 1940 Fidler married Edith Giler, a refugee who had fled Nazi Germany with her family, and settled in Mougins. At this time he began to learn the art of ceramics. The couple escaped from the French Riviera when the Nazis took over Free France in 1943, finding shelter in Roussillon under the assumed Gentile name of Fournier to evade the Vichy antisemitic laws and round-ups. He painted and made ceramics with his wife, producing small objects like buttons, earrings and necklaces. While holding showing, under the assumed name of Fournier, he met Samuel Beckett and painter Henri Hayden, also refugees on the run.

In 1944 when Provence was liberated. The Fidlers returned to Mougins, where he and Edith turned out utilitarian objects like vases, ashtrays, dishes and candle-holders. A daughter, Catherine, was born in 1947, but the couple divorced in 1950 and Fidler moved to Paris where he would works for the next couple of years. In 1952 Fidler resettled in Vallauris where he has regular shows of his work. At this period he became friends with Picasso and Jacqueline Roque. In 1956 he married his second wife, Edith Ramos, from the Azores, his student in ceramics and then co-worker. The couple had a daughter, Nathalie, in 1956. Fidler returned again to Roussillon in 1959, while travelling frequently across Europe and the Americas. He remained there painting and producing ceramics pieces in Roussillon-en-Provence until his death in 1990.

== Works ==
Fidler worked with many different painting techniques, including oil, water colours, inks, engraving, etching, pencils, and even the basic felt pens, but it is certainly that of the collage which he has explored the most. Setting himself apart from the trends and fashions of the times, he developed his own artistic style, finding his inspiration in his personal mythology, and background, as well as in the discoveries he made when travelling. For his work as a ceramicist he used mostly grog (also called firesand or chamotte). He never used the wheel, but built up his pieces by hand, in the traditional way.

He was a friend of the group of ceramicists called ‘Le Tryptique’, and was one of those who experimented various techniques for firing, and glazing. He also produced much larger pieces for the lobby of a private residence in Cannes, or for the schoolyard of a school in the Paris area.

== Exhibitions ==
- Vallauris at the Nerolium et at the « Biennale de Ceramique d’Art »
- Barcelone – 'Sala Gaspar' (1958)
- Cannes, Galerie 65 and 'Galerie Art de France' (1961)
- Nice - Galerie of the Hotel Plaza (1965)
- Los Angeles – Philadelphia Gallery
- San Remo - 'Galeria Beniamino' (1968)
- Avignon – 'Galerie Odile Guerin' (1973)
- Bonn (Germany) at the French Institute (1979)
- Cairo – at the Consul’s Residence (1981)
- Menerbes-en-Provence - 'Galerie Cance-Manguin' – (1982)
- Zurich (Switzerland)– Gallery Kringel (1985)
- Verbier (Switzerland) – 'Atelier Flaminia' (1990)
- Oberhausen (Germany) part of the collection of the 'Stadische Galerie Schloss'.
