= Yefim Krimerman =

- Born: Yefim Krimerman; 1923; Bălţi
- Died: 2015 (aged 91–92); Aachen, Germany
- Resting place: Germany
- Other names: Efim Ciuntu-Krimerman; Grigore Singurel
- Citizenship: Sovyet; German
- Education: Moldova State University
- Occupations: Poet, lyricist and journalist
- Employer(s): Radio Free Europe; Moldavian State Philharmonic Society

Yefim Krimerman (1923–2015) was a Soviet Bessarabian poet, lyricist and journalist in the Romanian language. In he 1980 emigrated for a short time to Israel, and then settled in Germany. There he worked at Free Europe radio under the pseudonym Grigore Singurel

== Biography ==
Yefim Krimerman was born in Bălţi, in 1923 in a Jewish family. He graduated from the Philological Faculty of Moldova State University. Singurel worked as a lecturer and musicologist of the Moldavan State Philharmonic Society. In 1980 he moved to Israel, but soon moved to Munich, where he worked for Radio Free Europe.

== Works ==
- Grigore Singurel, Moldavia on the Barricades of Perestroika, 1989

== Lyrics for songs ==
- De ce plâng chitarele? (1969)
- Cântă un artist (1969)
- Pe strada însorită (1969) (composer Arkady Luxemburg)
- Fără tine (1969) (composer Arkady Luxemburg)

== Bibliography ==
- Sovetskaya Moldavia, Chişinău, "The 'Knight' of the Lie and Slander" in Russian language, 4 September 1984, p. 3.
