= Rădoaia =

- Village
- Location in Moldova
- Coordinates: 47°44′N 28°10′E
- Country: Moldova
- District: Sîngerei District

Population (2014 census)
  - Total: 5,141
- Time zone: UTC+2 (EET)
  - Summer (DST): UTC+3 (EEST)

Rădoaia is a village in Sîngerei District, Moldova.

== Notable people ==
- Ștefan Pirogan
