= Deca-press =

Moldovan news agency

DECA-press Agency is a news agency from Moldova. It was launched in 1997. According to its official website, Deca-press provides daily news, commentaries, syntheses, articles and interviews to its clients which depict events or social, economic and political problems held in Moldova, covering all the major interest areas for information consumers. It is located in Bălți, Moldova on 18, Mihai Viteazul street, 3rd floor.

The agency claims to have a well-developed network of reporters that diffuse news from Chișinău and from most of the regions of the Republic of Moldova, including the Transnistrian region. The news products (up to 30 individual pieces of news per day) in Romanian, Russian and English are distributed via e-mail, and are available by subscription of for free on its website. The services the agency provides include several bulletins of market analysis, various business information, economic and business events, news on the associative sector activities, local news about personalities, fashionable and life style, a bulletin of news, articles and commentaries depicting subjects regarding life in Transnistria, a service describing issues of Moldova's European integration and events from the EU community agenda.
