= Riorita Paterău =

Moldovan musician and politician (born 1962)

Member of the Moldovan Parliament
- In office 20 March 2001 – 6 March 2005
- Parliamentary group: Christian-Democratic People's Party

Personal details
- Born: 23 October 1962 (age 63) Volodeni, Moldavian SSR, Soviet Union
- Party: PPCD

Riorita Paterău (born 23 October 1962) is a Moldovan musician and politician who served in the Parliament of Moldova from 2001 until 2005. A member of the Christian-Democratic People's Party, she represented the Bălți constituency, and was a prominent anti-communist activist.

== Biography ==
Riorita Paterău was born on 23 October 1962 in the northern village of Volodeni. A musician by training, Paterău works as a piano teacher and has been a member of several chamber ensembles. She was also the "head of department at the College of Music and Pedagogy" in the city of Bălți.

In the 2001 Moldovan parliamentary election, Paterău was elected to the Parliament of Moldova, representing the Bălți constituency as a member of the Christian-Democratic People's Party (PPCD). Throughout her tenure, Paterău was a prominent opponent of the ruling Party of Communists. In 2002, Paterău and seven other PPCD MPs led protests in Chișinău in opposition to the "officialization of the Russian language and its introduction as a compulsory subject of study in schools"; these protests had been deemed illegal by local authorities. As a result, the Office of the Prosecutor General requested that the President of the Moldovan Parliament, Eugenia Ostapciuc of the communists, remove the parliamentary immunity of the eight MPs so that they could be prosecuted. Paterău took part in another protest in Bălți in June 2004 following the decision of the communist-controlled city council to re-install a statue of Vladimir Lenin in the city center. During the protest, altercations erupted between protestors and police officers, with Paterău being "assaulted by a policeman".

While in parliament, Paterău served on the "commission for culture, science, education, youth and mass media". She was also an alternate member of the Moldovan delegation to the Parliamentary Assembly of the Council of Europe, and delivered a speech to the body in 2002. Paterău left office at the end of her term in 2005.
