= Elizaveta, Moldova =

Elizaveta
- Village
- Location in Moldova
- Coordinates: 47°47′N 28°01′E
- Country: Moldova
- District: Bălți

Government
  - Mayor: Simion Magnet (PAS)

Area
  - Total: 10.34 sq mi (26.77 km^{2})

Population (2024 census)
  - Total: 2,620
  - Density: 253/sq mi (97.9/km^{2})
- Time zone: UTC+2 (EET)
  - Summer (DST): UTC+3 (EEST)

Elizaveta is a village in the municipality of Bălți in the north of Moldova. It has an area of 26.77 km^{2} (10.34 sq mi), and a population of 2,620 at the 2024 Moldovan census.
