= Bălți =

Second-largest city in Moldova

- Municipality
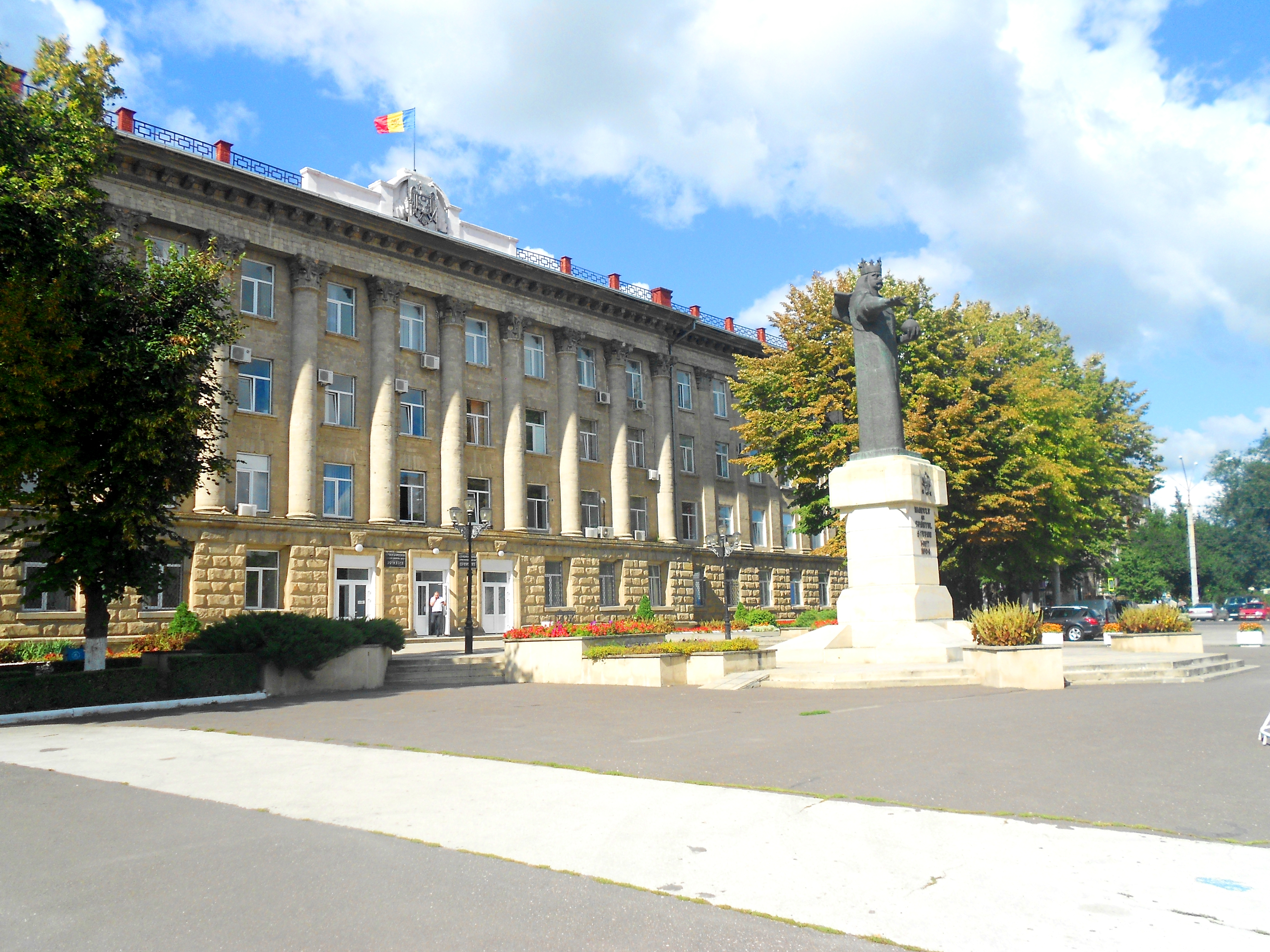
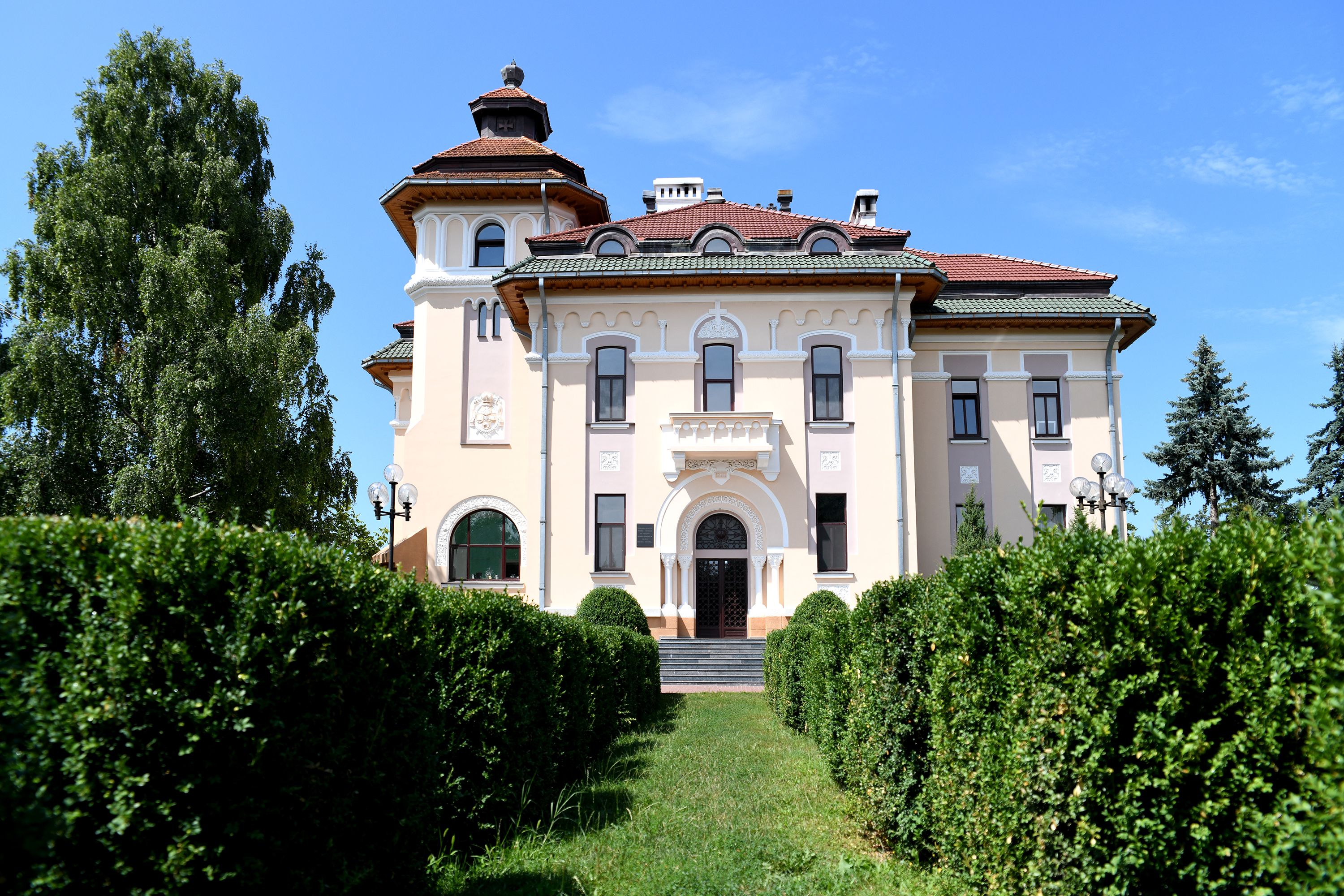
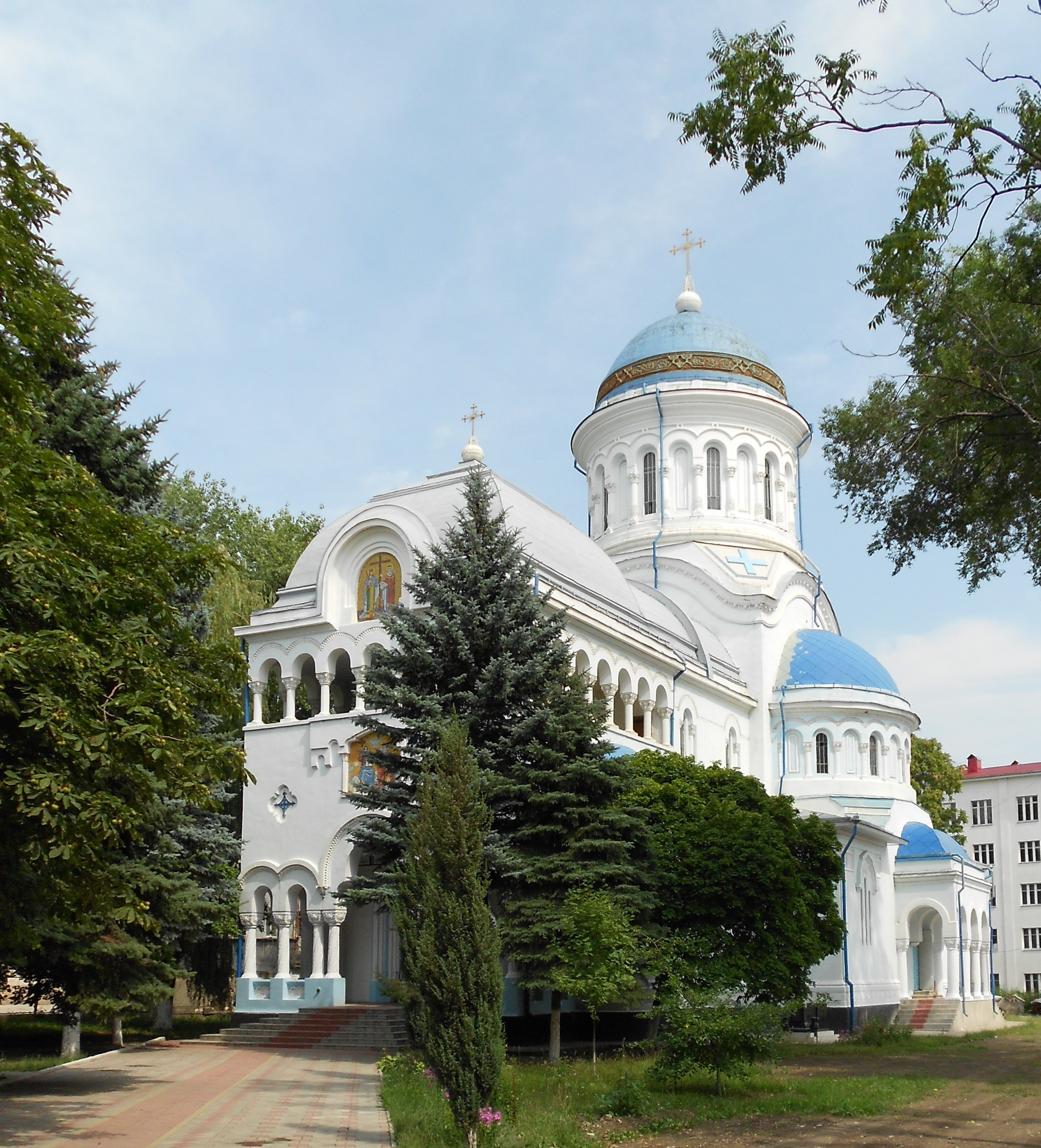
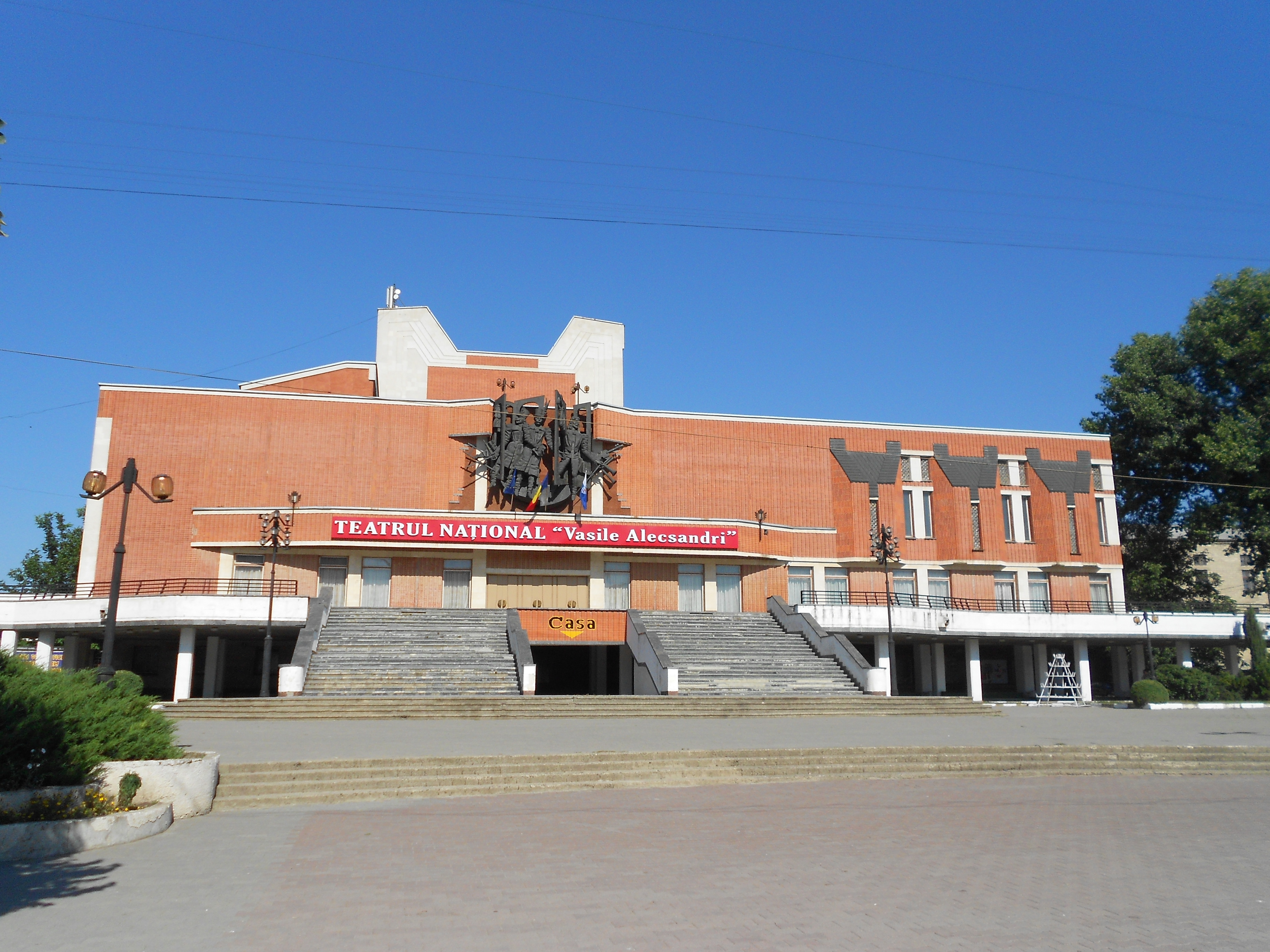
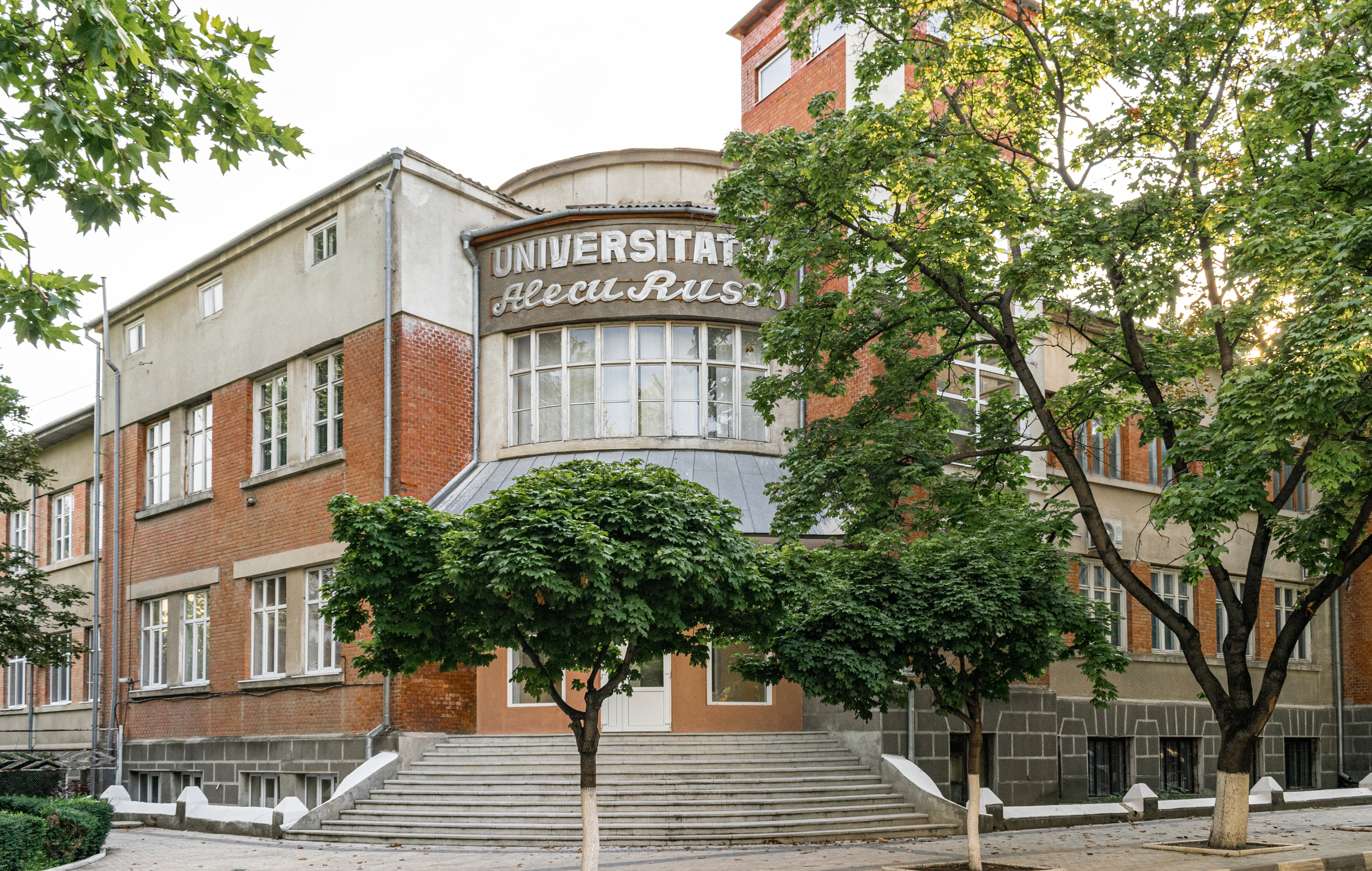
- Piața Independenței and City Hall Bishop's Palace Cathedral National Theatre Alecu Russo State University of Bălți

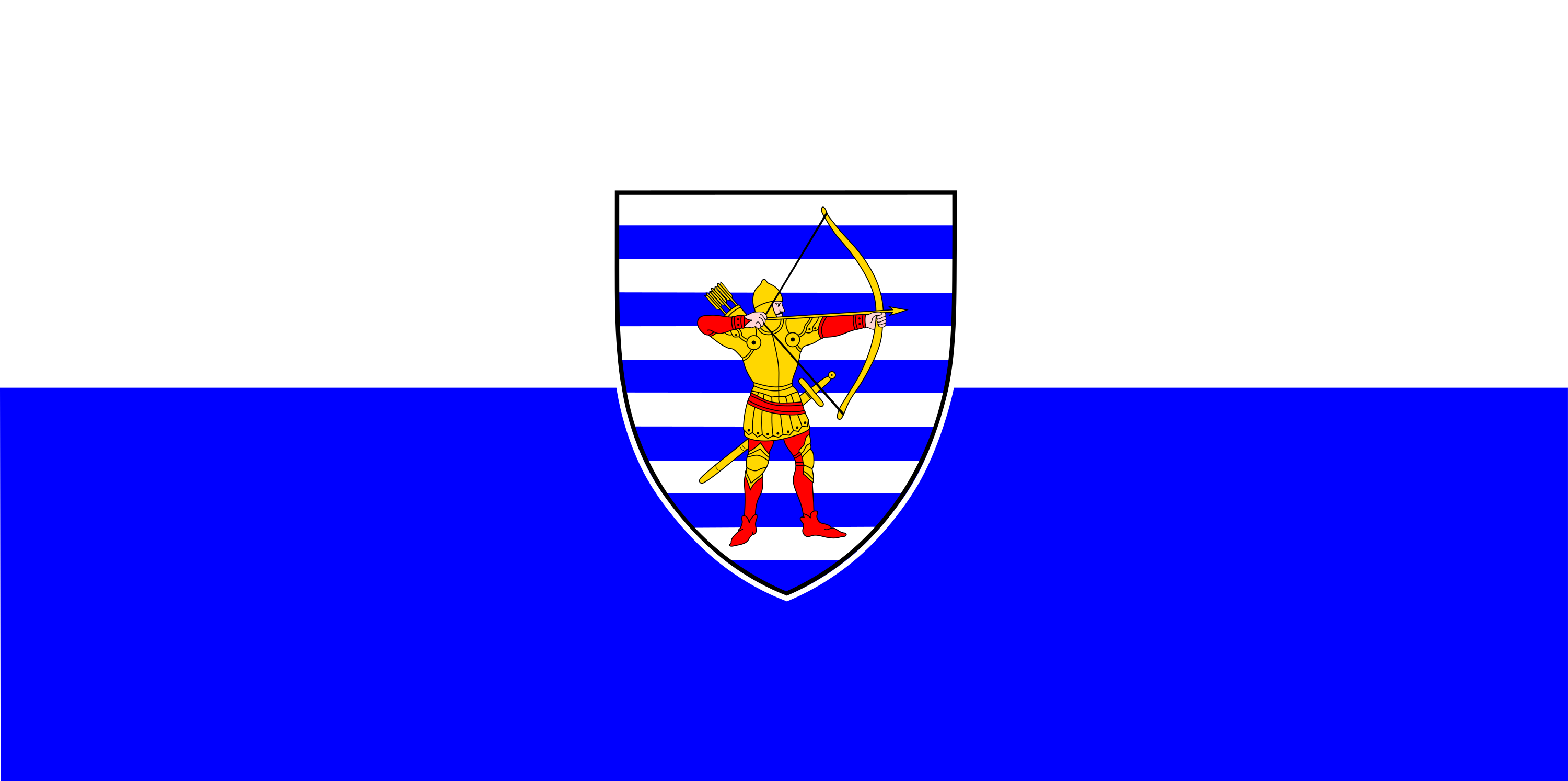
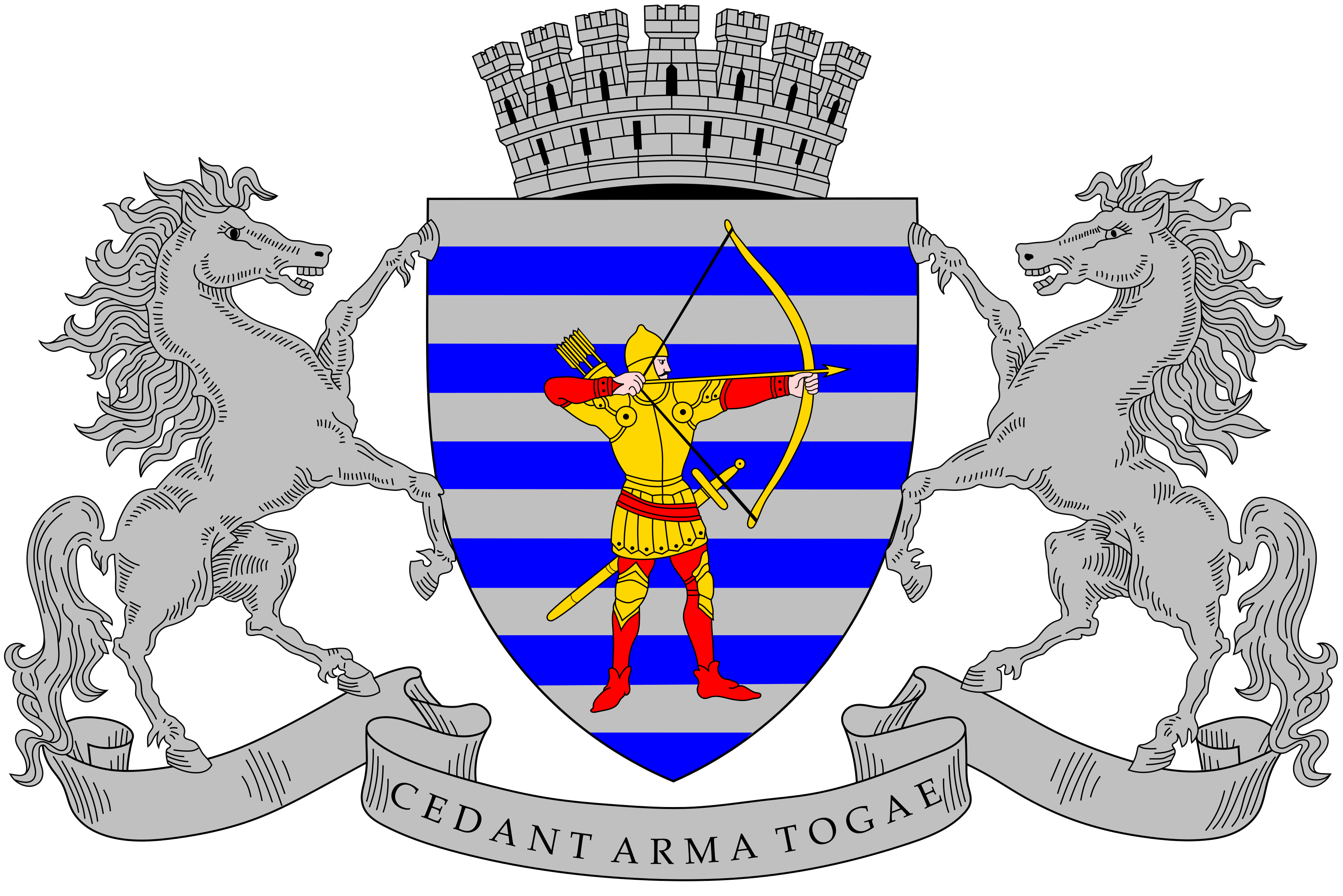
- Flag Seal

- Bălți highlighted red in Moldova

- Location within Moldova
- Coordinates: 47°46′N 27°55′E
- Country: Moldova
- Communes: Sadovoe, Elizaveta
- Founded: 1620
- City rights: 1803

Government
  - Type: Mayor–council government
  - Mayor: Alexandr Petkov (Our Party)

Area
  - Metro: 77.6 km^{2} (30.0 sq mi)
- Elevation: 59 m (194 ft)

Population (2024)
  - Municipality: 90,954
  - Rank: 2
  - Metro Note: In this infobox, the "Metro" is the municipality (including Bălți, Elizaveta, and Sadovoe), while the "Municipality" is the city of Bălți proper.: 94,546
  - Metro density: 1,220/km^{2} (3,160/sq mi)
- Time zone: UTC+2 (EET)
  - Summer (DST): UTC+3 (EEST)
- Postal code: MD-3100
- Area code: +373 231 X-XX-XX
- Licence plate: BL XX 000/ XXX 000
- Website: Official website

Bălți (Romanian pronunciation: [ˈbəltsʲ]) is a city in Moldova. It is the third-largest city in terms of population, area and economic importance, after Chișinău and Tiraspol. The city holds the status of Municipality. It is a major industrial, cultural and commercial centre and transportation hub in the north of the country. It is situated 127 kilometres (79 mi) north of the capital Chișinău, and is located on the river Răut, a tributary of the Dniester, on a hilly landscape in the Bălți steppe. As of the 2024 Moldovan census, the Municipality had a population of 94,546 - while the city of Bălți proper had a population of 90,954.

== Name ==
The word "bălți" (pl. of Romanian sing. "baltă") in direct translation means "puddle". It is believed that the city had been named thus because it was founded on a hill dominating the wetland formed where the creek Răuțel ("Little Răut") falls into the river Răut.

In addition to the official name Bălți and the Russian name Бельцы (Beltsy), between 1940 and 1989 in Moldovan Cyrillic alphabet, and after 1989 in Russian, the name was/is also rendered in Cyrillic as Бэлць (Russian pronunciation: [ˈbɛɫts]).

== History and symbols ==
=== Coat of arms ===
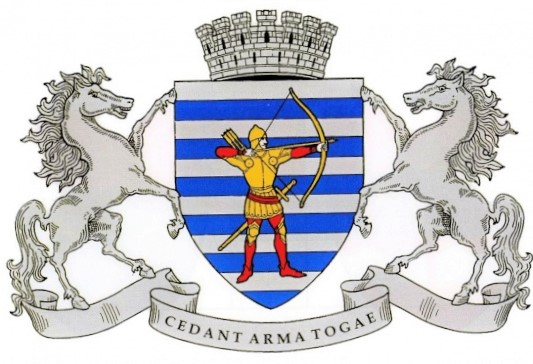
Current coat of arms

The current coat of arms and flag of Bălți, elaborated by Silviu Tabac from the Moldovan State Commission for Heraldry, were adopted by the Municipal Council in April 2006.

A shield, with alternating six silvery strips (symbolizing water), and six blue strips (symbolizing earth), form the background (symbolizing the name of the city). The central element of the shield is an archer in red clothes, in the military outfit (yellow) of Stephen III of Moldavia (Romanian: Ștefan cel Mare) times (15th century). The archer represents the medieval military recruitment, formed by local free peasants.

On top of the shield is a silver crown in the shape of a fortress wall with seven towers. (The crown represents the fact that the locality is a city. Apart from Bălți, only the capital Chișinău, and Tiraspol are allowed to have seven towers, while other cities must limit this number to three or five.) The shield is supported by two rearing silver horses (the white horse is the traditional symbol of the region, which was part of Iași County before 1812). Under the shield, there is a ribbon with the Latin inscription CEDANT ARMA TOGAE, meaning let arms yield to the toga.

In the Middle Ages, the archer was featured on the coats of arms of the region. In the 19th century, the city and district coats of arms also featured a horse head. In the early 20th century, a shield representing an archer, standing on a hill, the sun, and three bullrush sticks (elements quite sufficient to identify the place where Bălți is situated in the landscape of the north of Moldova) formed the coat of arms of the Bălți county, while these and horse elements - the coat of arms of the city proper.

=== Flag ===
The city's flag is composed of two horizontal strips: a blue one on the bottom, and a silver one on top. The shield and archer elements from the coat of arms are also present in the centre of the flag.

== Geography ==
Bălți is situated on the tops and slopes of three hills and in two small valleys. The land in the north of Moldova is very fertile, mostly consisting of black earth or chernozem. Several extraction sites for raw materials used in the construction industry are also found in the vicinity of Bălți. The creeks Răuțel, Copăceanca, and Flămândă cross the territory of the municipality, and flow into the river Răut. Also, several lakes are situated in Bălți: City Lake, Komsolskoe Lake, Hunters and Fishermen Lake, Strâmba Lake.

The municipality covers an area of 78.0 square kilometres (30.1 sq mi), of which the city proper 41.42 square kilometres (15.99 sq mi), the village Elizaveta (an eastern suburb) 9.81 square kilometres (3.79 sq mi), and the village Sadovoe (a north-western suburb) 26.77 square kilometres (10.34 sq mi). Of these, an important portion (20.11 square kilometres (7.76 sq mi)) is agriculturally cultivated.

=== Neighbourhoods ===
The city itself is located on portions of three hills. The river Răut separates one of the hills to the north-east, the slopes of this hill are occupied by the neighbourhood Slobozia. Răut's affluent Răuțel separates another hill in the south, the slopes of which are the Podul Chișinăului. The largest of the three hills dominates the valleys of the creek and river, and contains the city centre and the old town, and the neighbourhoods Pământeni, Dacia, 6th district, 8th district, the city's main industrial area, and Molodova neighborhood. The top of this hill is occupied by the medical facilities district. Bălții Noi neighborhood is situated in the valley of the Răuțel creek.

A Soroca neighborhood, 10th district, 9th district, the area of the former Bălți concentration camp, and the Bălți City Airport are situated in the valley of the Răut river.

The names of city neighborhoods reflect different historic influences, such as names of 19th century suburbs that are nowadays within city limits: Pământeni, Slobozia, Molodova, Podul Chișinăului, Bălții Noi; others are known by their Soviet-era names: 6th district, 8th district, 9th district. A neighbourhood in the northern part of the city is called Dacia, and is colloquially sometimes referred to as BAM. A district in the eastern part is known as 10th district.

== Cityscape ==
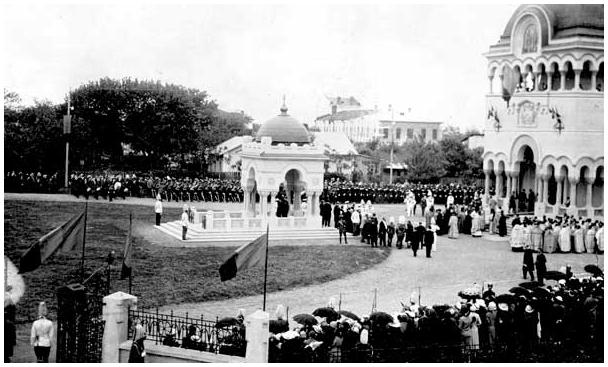
Consecration of Saint Constantine and Elena Cathedral on 2 June 1935

=== Architecture ===
Cultural venues in the city include:

- Vasile Alecsandri National Theatre
- The oldest surviving building, a two-story boyar house, right in the heart of the city centre, dates back to 1609. Though it has been re-constructed and re-modelled many times with total disregard to conservation to the extent that now it simply looks like an odd two-storey building.
- Monument of Stephen the Great (2003)
- Others (see down through the text)

Churches:

- Saint Nicolas Church, Bălți (1795). Although Orthodox, the building, financed by Gheorghe Panaiti, has a degree of catholic influence brought in by the architect Antuan Weismann from Galicia.
- Saint Constantine and Elena Cathedral, Bălți (1934), Orthodox, built in neo-Byzantine style. The building, at which official opening the Romanian royal family was present, survived almost without visible effects the harsh treatment during the Soviet era. During this time it was mostly a depot and later turned into the municipal museum.
- Bishopric Palace, Bălți (1924–1932), was the main office of the agricultural enterprise-institute "Selectia", and the surrounding park during the Soviet era.
- Saint Parascheva Church, Bălți (1933), by the bishop Visarion Puiu.
- Archangels Michael and Gabriel Church, Bălți (1912–1933)
- Saint Peter and Paul Church, Bălți (1915–1929)
- Armenian Saint Gregory Church, Bălți (1916)
- Birth of the Blessed Virgin Mary Church (1884)

=== Climate ===
Bălți has a hot-summer humid continental climate (Köppen climate classification Dfa). The all-time maximum temperature registered in the city was 38 °C (100 °F), the all-time minimum −32 °C (−26 °F). There are 450 to 550 mm (18 to 22 in) of annual rainfall, mostly during summer and fall. Winds are generally from the north-east or the north-west at about 2–5 m/s.

Climate data for Bălți (1991–2020, extremes 1945–present)
| Month | Jan | Feb | Mar | Apr | May | Jun | Jul | Aug | Sep | Oct | Nov | Dec | Year |
|---|---|---|---|---|---|---|---|---|---|---|---|---|---|
| Record high °C (°F) | 15.9 (60.6) | 21.6 (70.9) | 25.8 (78.4) | 31.3 (88.3) | 35.5 (95.9) | 37.9 (100.2) | 39.8 (103.6) | 40.0 (104.0) | 37.3 (99.1) | 31.6 (88.9) | 24.8 (76.6) | 18.8 (65.8) | 40.0 (104.0) |
| Mean daily maximum °C (°F) | 0.9 (33.6) | 3.3 (37.9) | 9.5 (49.1) | 17.1 (62.8) | 23.3 (73.9) | 26.7 (80.1) | 28.7 (83.7) | 28.5 (83.3) | 22.6 (72.7) | 15.7 (60.3) | 8.3 (46.9) | 2.4 (36.3) | 15.6 (60.1) |
| Daily mean °C (°F) | −2.3 (27.9) | −0.7 (30.7) | 4.1 (39.4) | 10.7 (51.3) | 16.4 (61.5) | 20.2 (68.4) | 22.0 (71.6) | 21.4 (70.5) | 16.0 (60.8) | 9.9 (49.8) | 4.3 (39.7) | −0.8 (30.6) | 10.1 (50.2) |
| Mean daily minimum °C (°F) | −5.5 (22.1) | −4.2 (24.4) | −0.5 (31.1) | 4.8 (40.6) | 10.1 (50.2) | 14.1 (57.4) | 15.8 (60.4) | 15.0 (59.0) | 10.4 (50.7) | 5.1 (41.2) | 1.0 (33.8) | −3.9 (25.0) | 5.2 (41.4) |
| Record low °C (°F) | −35.4 (−31.7) | −32.1 (−25.8) | −24.4 (−11.9) | −13.9 (7.0) | −2.3 (27.9) | 3.4 (38.1) | 7.3 (45.1) | 3.1 (37.6) | −5.6 (21.9) | −10.1 (13.8) | −18.4 (−1.1) | −30.2 (−22.4) | −35.4 (−31.7) |
| Average precipitation mm (inches) | 25 (1.0) | 24 (0.9) | 28 (1.1) | 35 (1.4) | 49 (1.9) | 68 (2.7) | 68 (2.7) | 48 (1.9) | 48 (1.9) | 36 (1.4) | 32 (1.3) | 28 (1.1) | 489 (19.3) |
| Average precipitation days (≥ 1.0 mm) | 6 | 5 | 6 | 6 | 8 | 8 | 8 | 6 | 6 | 5 | 5 | 6 | 74 |
| Average relative humidity (%) | 83 | 82 | 77 | 66 | 64 | 67 | 67 | 68 | 71 | 76 | 83 | 86 | 74 |
| Mean monthly sunshine hours | 59 | 87 | 151 | 204 | 254 | 266 | 282 | 278 | 209 | 144 | 73 | 56 | 2,058 |
Source 1: NOAA
Source 2: Serviciul Hidrometeorologic de Stat (extremes, relative humidity)

=== Seismology ===
The city is situated in the 7th zone of seismic activity, with a well-felt earthquake (generally without any serious structural damage to the city's buildings) occurring every 35 years on average.

== Demographics ==
According to the 2024 census, 94,546 inhabitants lived within the Bălți municipality limits, a decrease compared to the previous census in 2014, when 102,457 inhabitants were registered. The population of the city itself was 90,954, and that of the suburban villages of Elizaveta and Sadovoe was 2,620, and 972, respectively.

Ethnic composition of Bălți (2024)
1. Moldovans (Note: There is an ongoing controversy regarding the ethnic identification of Moldovans and Romanians.) (71.1%)
2. Romanians (3.70%)
3. Ukrainians (13.2%)
4. Russians (10.1%)
5. Others (1.60%)
Linguistic composition of Bălți (2024)
1. Moldovan (Note: In March 2023, the Parliament of Moldova passed a law updating all legislative texts and the constitution to refer to the national language as Romanian, effectively rendering the term "Moldovan" obsolete.) (36.6%)
2. Romanian (21.2%)
3. Russian (37.2%)
4. Ukrainian (4.50%)
5. Other (0.50%)

Historical population
| Year | Pop. | ±% |
|---|---|---|
| 1819 | 1,600 | — |
| 1830 | 3,738 | +133.6% |
| 1861 | 5,900 | +57.8% |
| 1897 | 18,500 | +213.6% |
| 1902 | 22,300 | +20.5% |
| 1915 | 24,000 | +7.6% |
| 1930 | 30,570 | +27.4% |
| 1959 | 67,666 | +121.3% |
| 1970 | 105,505 | +55.9% |
| 1979 | 126,950 | +20.3% |
| 1989 | 161,475 | +27.2% |
| 2004 | 127,561 | −21.0% |
| 2014 | 102,457 | −19.7% |
| 2024 | 94,546 | −7.7% |

Religious composition of Bălți (2024)
1. Christian Orthodox (91.5%)
2. Baptists (1.80%)
3. Jehovah's Witnesses (1.10%)
4. Other (1.90%)
5. Irreligious (2.10%)
6. Not stated (1.50%)

=== Social aspects ===
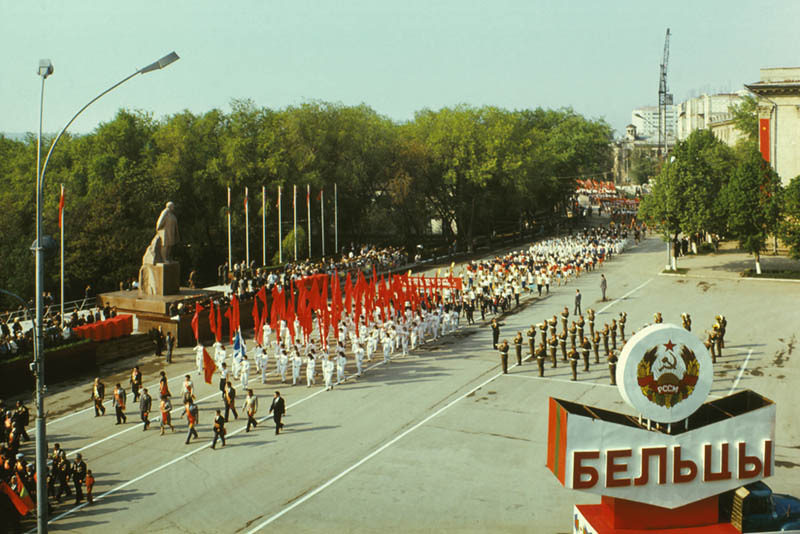
A mass demonstration on a square in Bălți in 1985.

The post-independence decrease in the city population is mainly due to the economic and demographic situation of Moldova, which prompted a wave of permanent or temporary emigration.

Remittances from the migrant workers account for 30% of Moldova's GDP, the highest percentage in all of Europe. Often, elderly relatives and children of these workers are left to live in Bălți.

The majority of the population of Bălți is bilingual (Romanian and Russian). Many people in the city also understand and/or speak Ukrainian.

=== Pre-WWII Jewish Community ===
"Between the two world wars, the Jewish community of Bălți was a vibrant population of trade, industry and culture, Zionism and Yiddish, political parties and youth movements. Bălți was the second-largest populated city in Bessarabia, with the second-largest number of Jewish inhabitants after Chișinău, and the economic center of the region. In the official 1930 census, Bălți was listed as having 14,229 Jewish residents, about 60% of its total population.

"Following the Molotov–Ribbentrop Agreement, Bălți was absorbed into the Soviet Union in the summer of 1940, coming under Soviet rule.

"On 22 June 1941, the Germans invaded the USSR. On 9 July, Bălți was occupied by German and Romanian armies, and waves of abuse and murder began. At the end of July, the German units and Gestapo officers left the city in the hands of the Romanians. In September 1941 the last of the Jews of Bălți– some 2,800 people – were expelled to the Mărculești Camp, and the Jewish population of the city ceased to exist. In Mărculești, many members of the community died, and the rest were deported to Transnistria."

== Culture and contemporary life ==
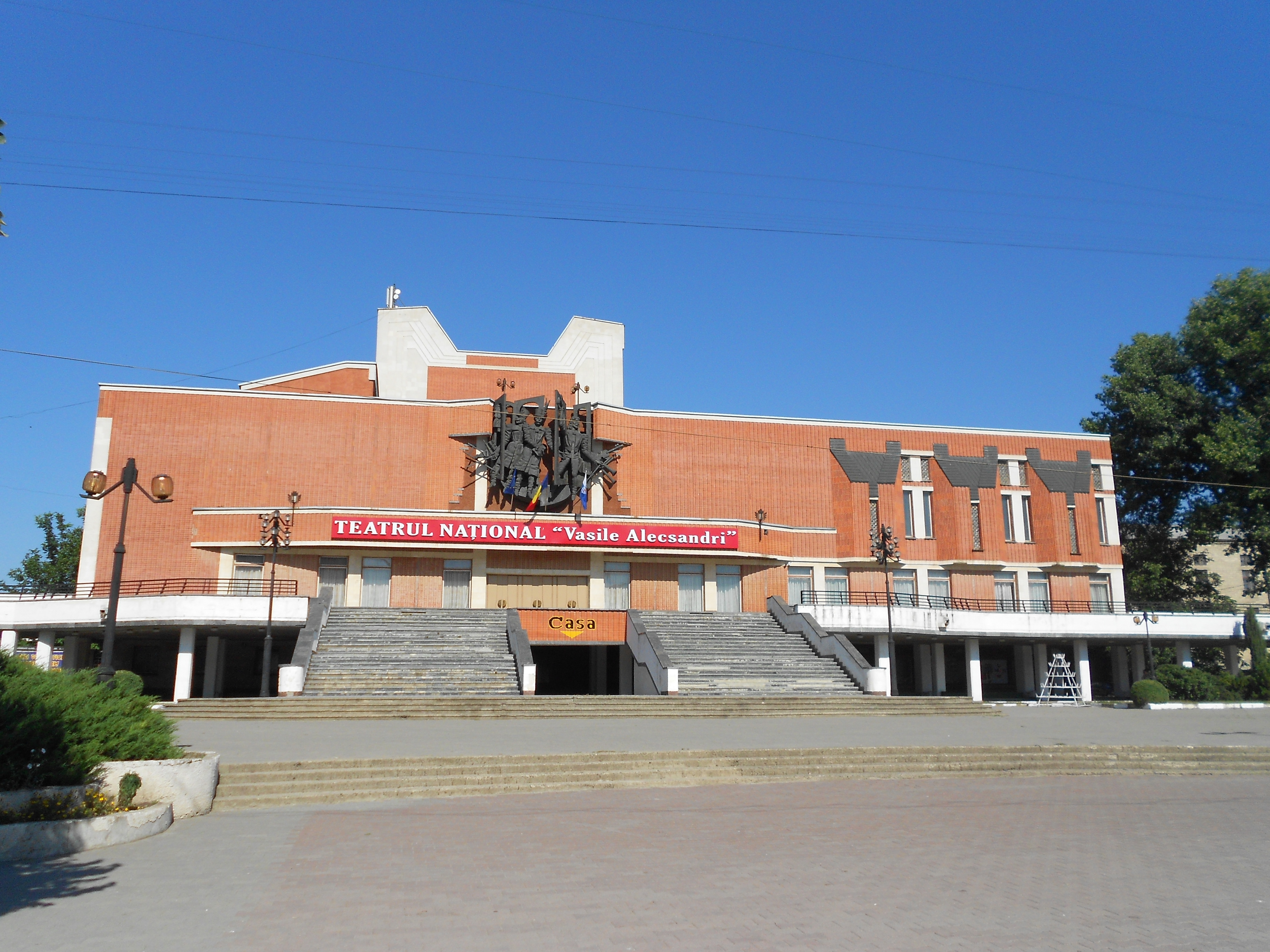
Vasile Alecsandri National Theatre

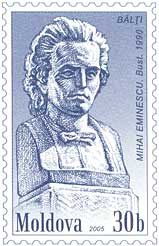
Moldovan stamp with Mihai Eminescu's statue in Bălți

=== Entertainment and performing arts ===
Theaters:

- Vasile Alecsandri National Theatre
- "Eugène Ionesco" Theatre
- "Licurici" Republican Puppet Theatre
- "B.P. Hajdeu" Republican Drama-Muzical Theatre
- "Mihai Eminescu" National Theatre
- "Luceafarul" Republican Theatre
- Municipal Theatre "Satiricus I.L. Caragiale"

Museums and art galleries:

- "Exhibition of the Union of painters "Constantin Brâncuși"
- Artum Art Gallery

=== Media ===
- NordNews, news agency founded in March 2018
- Spros i Predlojenie, a major Russian language daily newspaper serving northern Moldova
- Deca-press, the oldest independent press agency in the north of the country
- Golos Bălți, the city newspaper, founded in 1947
- Makler, an advertising newspaper operating in Moldova and Ukraine

=== Civil society ===
Bălți is a hub for civil society development, both locally and nationally. The city hosts numerous independent and apolitical organizations, such as Second Breath, a Moldovan NGO supporting socially vulnerable individuals, and Tinerii pentru Dreptul la Viață (“Youth for the Right to Live”), a youth-focused organization.

=== Sports ===
- 7 sport schools in Bălți offer programmes in the following sports: Orienteering, volleyball, handgun shooting sports, equestrianism, basketball, handball, weightlifting, chess, swimming, canoeing, football, athletics, tourism.
- Municipal Stadium "Olimpia Bălți Stadium" (home of FC Olimpia Bălți)
- Olympic Swimming Pool "Central"
- Olympic Swimming Pool "Volna" (open air)
- FC Bălți is a football club based in the city and plays in Moldova's top league, the Moldovan National Division

== Economy ==
Historically Bălți was known for producing tobacco. They also had many vineyards and orchards.

Most of the city's industry centres on food processing, notably in the production of flour, sugar, and wine. Manufacturing of furniture and agricultural machinery also plays an important role in Bălți's economy.

The service sector has developed after 1989 to cover the basic needs of the population.

=== Manufacturing ===
This city is an important economic centre, with manufacturing playing an important role. Besides traditional for Moldova wine making, sugar, meat processing, flour milling, oil production, and light industry in general, Bălți is the centre for manufacturing of agricultural machinery, of various construction materials, fur, textile, chemical and furniture industries. A mammoth Soviet-type conglomerate 8,000-worker factory (called "Lenin" before 1989 and "Răut" afterwards) produced a large variety of machine building products for consumer or industry use, from irons and telephone sets to sonar equipment for Soviet military submarines. However, due to swift changes in the economic environment after the breakdown of the Soviet planned economy system, the manufacturing base of the city has severely suffered. Nevertheless, more recently, new economic ties are being created, with collaboration and direct investment mostly from the European Union.

Lisa Dräxlmaier GmbH celebrated the inauguration of its second plant in Moldova. The facility, which will be located in Balti, will produce wiring harnesses. The plant has about 13,000 square metres (140,000 square feet) of production and logistics space.

=== Shopping ===
Bălți has several major shopping chain outlets, such as the German Metro Group AG, Ukrainian Fourchette and Moldovan Fidesco.

Numerous shops, can be found in the central (retail), eastern (en gros) and northern (retail) parts of the city. The biggest shopping galleries are located in the centre and in the Dacia district (north) of the city. Souvenir boutiques are mostly found around the central square Vasile Alecsandri. The central market is open from early morning.

A variety of small private stores and supermarkets are available. There are also six public-owned and four private-owned markets. More recently several supermarket chains have opened stores in the city.

=== Health facilities ===
The city has a big Republican hospital, another multifunctional municipal hospital, a children's hospital, and a range of other medical facilities (smaller clinics and hospitals, as well as buildings, named poly-clinics, gathering doctors offices).

== Government ==
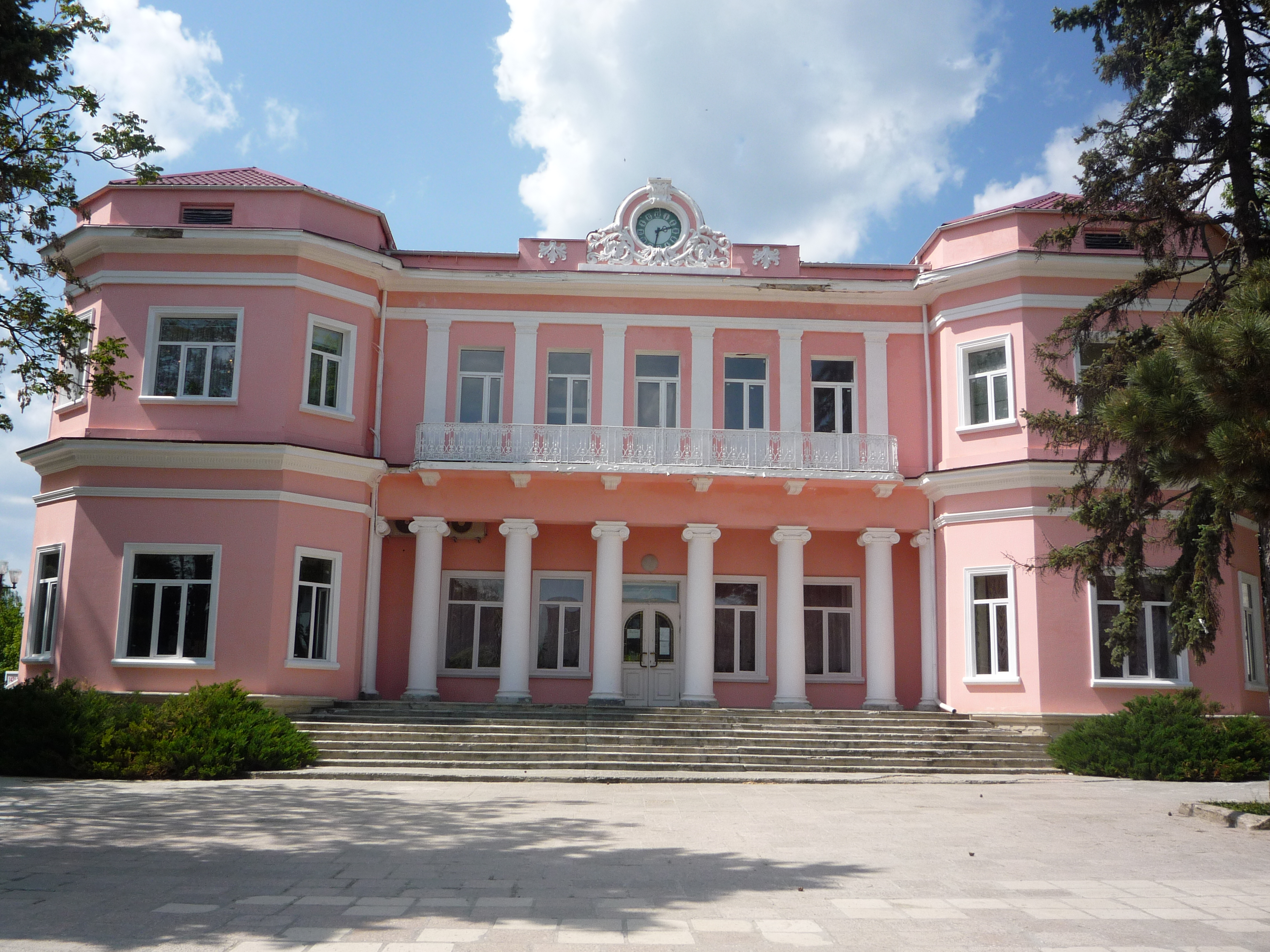
Register office in Bălți

Bălți Municipality is a territorial unit of Moldova (one of its 3 municipalities not subordinated to other territorial units; it has had the status of municipality since 1994), containing the city itself, and the villages of Elizaveta and Sadovoe.

The Mayor (Romanian: Primar) heads the Mayor's Office (Romanian: Primăria) and is responsible for administering local affairs. The mayor is elected for a four-year term. Alexandr Petkov of Our Party (PN) has served as mayor since 2023.

The Municipal Council serves as a consultative and deliberative body with limited powers in determining general policy. It consists of 35 councillors elected every four years. Following the local public administration elections of November 2023, Our Party (PN) won 11 seats, the Party of Socialists secured 9, the Party of Action and Solidarity obtained 6, and representatives of other parties held the remaining 9.

=== Politics ===
Bălți has traditionally been a bastion of the PCRM and other pro-Russian political movements, owing to its substantial Russian-speaking population. In recent years, however, the city's political landscape has grown more balanced.

Summary of the 28 September 2025 parliamentary election results in Bălți Municipality
| Parties and coalitions | Votes | % | +/− |
|---|---|---|---|
| Patriotic Electoral Bloc | 20,426 | 41.51 | +1.34 |
| Party of Action and Solidarity | 13,074 | 26.57 | -0.77 |
| Our Party | 7,149 | 14.53 | -8.16 |
| Alternative | 5,403 | 10.98 | new |
| Democracy at Home Party | 919 | 1.87 | +1.39 |
| Other | 2,240 | 4.55 | -4.77 |
| Total (turnout 50.23%) | 50,189 | 100.00 | |

=== Military ===
The 1st Motorized Infantry Brigade "Moldova" of the Moldovan Land Forces Command (out of a total of 6 brigades – three infantry, one artillery, one airborne and one anti-aircraft) is located in Bălți. A unit of Soviet Tochka-M short-range rockets, each carrying 500 kg (1,102 lb) of conventional explosive, was known to be based in the city. No up to date information is available.

== Education ==
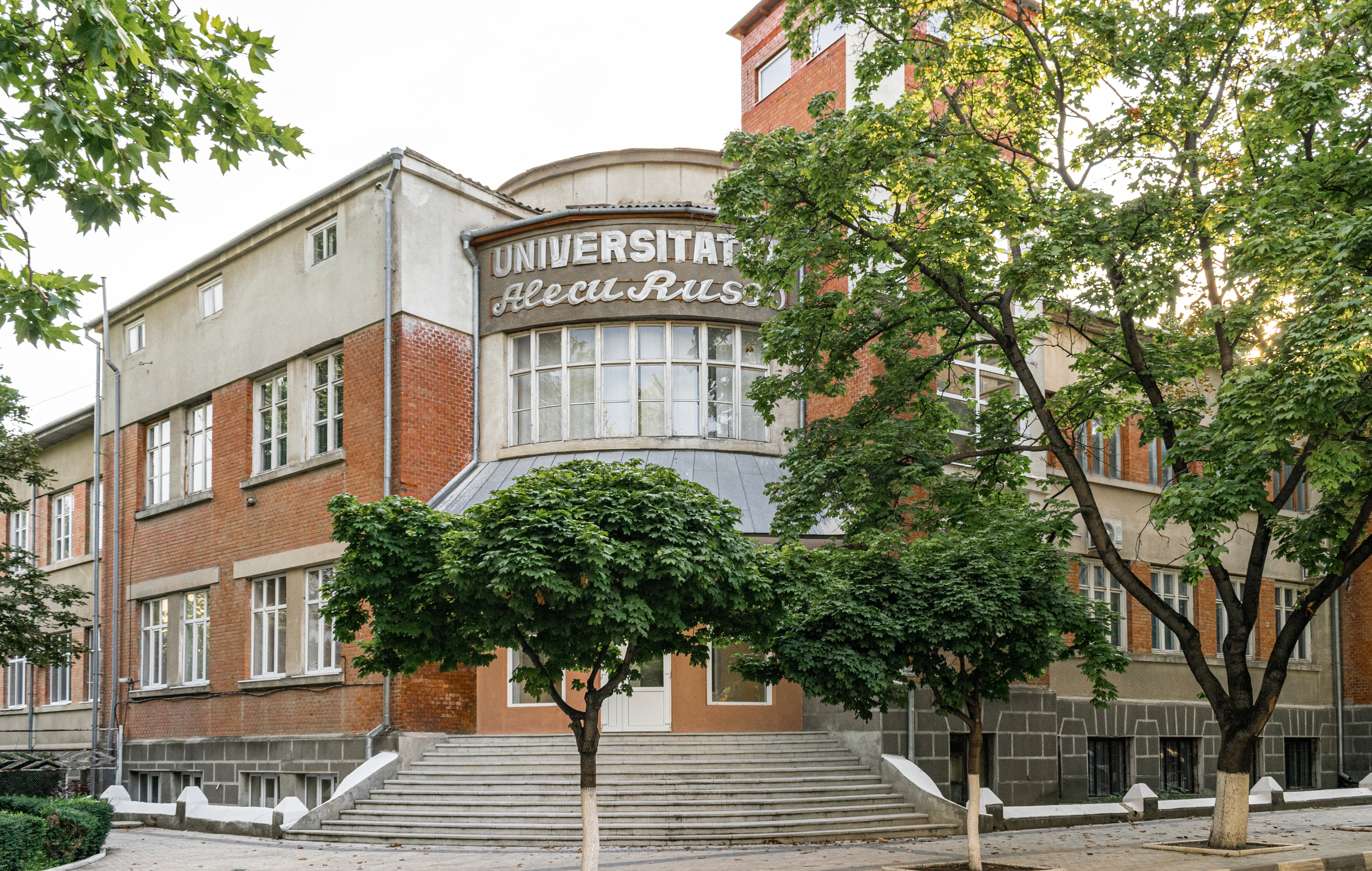
Rectorate of the Alecu Russo University

=== Primary and Secondary Education ===
There are 13 lyceums and 6 professional education institutions (Romanian: colegii) offering the last 3 years of high school education and 2 years post-high school technical education. Also, 14 secondary schools (numbered 2, 3, 4, 6, 7, 9, 10, 12, 14, 15, 16, 19, 21, 23), 7 professional or professional-technical schools (numbered 1 through 7), and 3 boarding schools, including one for visually impaired are located in the city.

=== Higher education ===
The Alecu Russo University of Bălți is the city's oldest and only running institute of higher education. It has four faculties:

- Faculty of Letters
- Faculty of Real, Economic and Environmental Sciences
- Faculty of Education, Psychology and the Arts
- Faculty of Law and Social Sciences

The main teaching language at the university is Romanian, while specialized courses can be taken in Russian, English, French, German or Ukrainian.

== Historical monuments and architecture ==
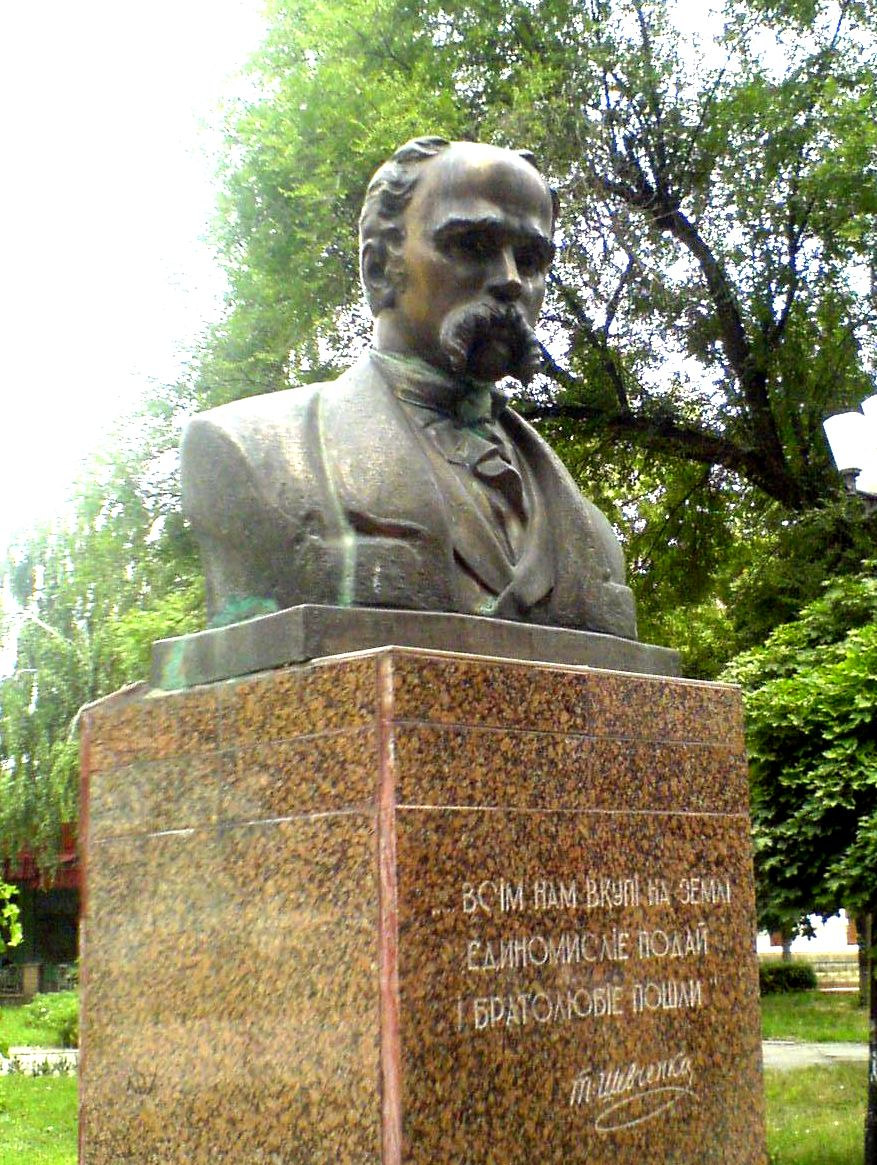
Monument to Taras Shevchenko in Bălți

- Saint Nicolas Cathedral (1795)
- Church of the Nativity of the Virgin Mary (1884)
- Saint Gregory Armenian Church (1916)
- Saint Constantine and Helen Cathedral (1935)
- Saint Parascheva Church (1934)
- Church of the Holy Apostles Peter and Paul (1929)
- Church of the Holy Archangels Michael and Gabriel (1933)
- Bălți Bishopric (1934)
- Vasile Alecsandri National Theatre
- Matrimonial Palace
- History and Ethnography Museum
- A monument of Stefan the Great (2003)
- Bust of Mihai Eminescu
- Bust of Vasile Alecsandri
- Bust of Taras Shevchenko (2001)
- A monument to soldiers killed in Afghanistan (1999)
- Bust of King Ferdinand I of Romania from the University of Bălți. Author Veaceslav Jiglitski (2023)

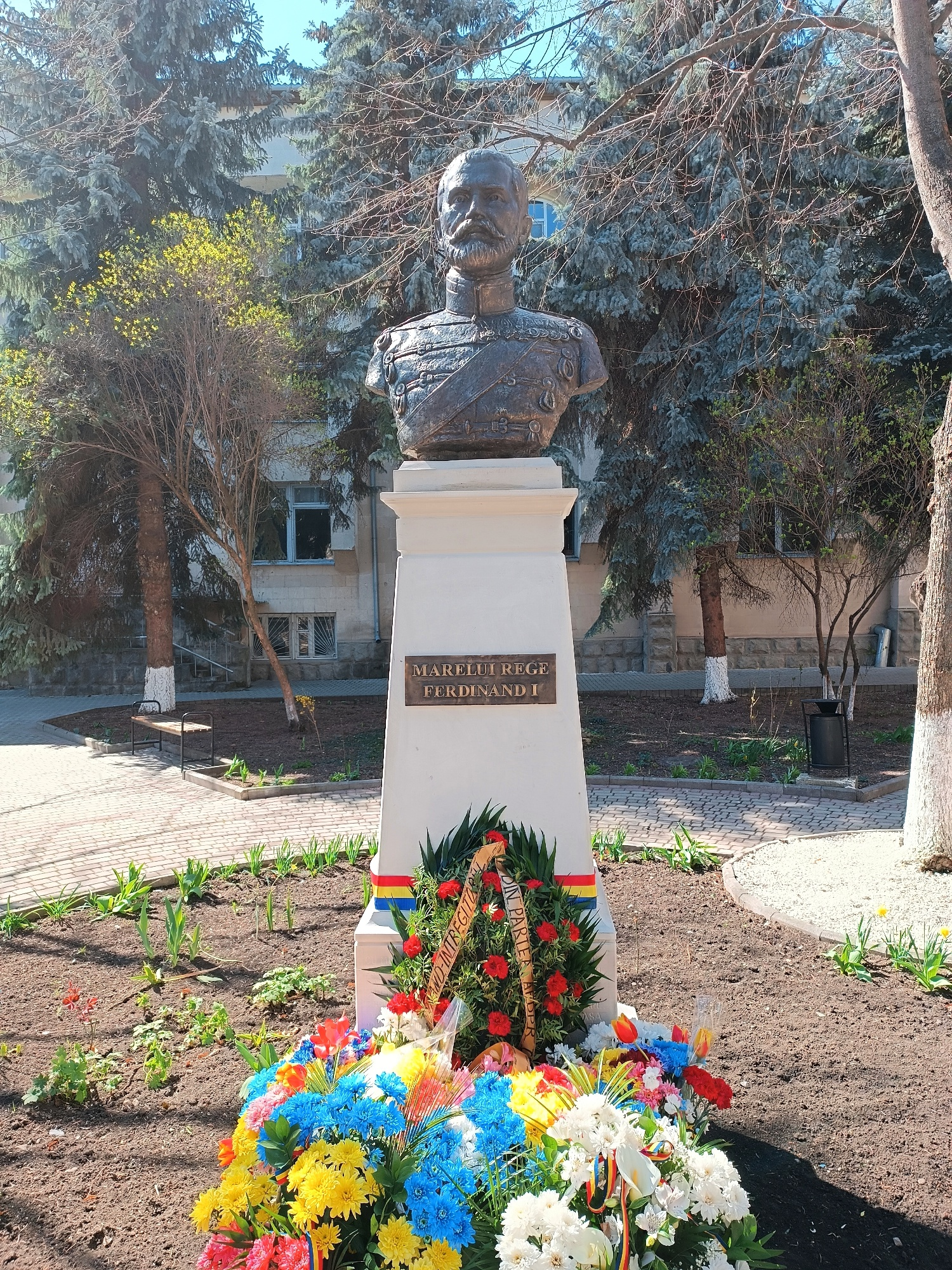
Monument of King Ferdinand I of Romania

== Transport ==
=== Public transport ===
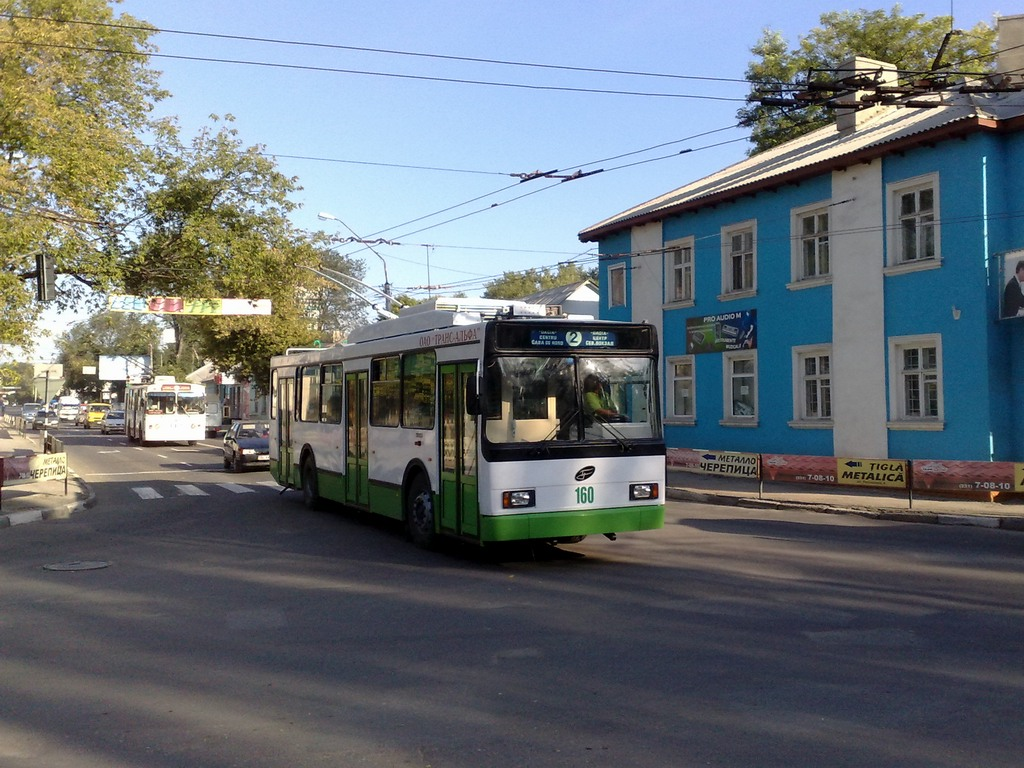
Trans-Alfa trolleybus in Bălți

Passenger transport in Bălți is handled mainly by the Bălți Trolleybus Authority and Bălți Bus Authority, as well as by private bus, minibus and taxi companies. The total number of passengers transported in Bălți in 2004 was 35.4 million.

There are around 25 minibus lines in Bălți and its agglomeration. The Bălți Bus Authority (B.B.A.) provides regular bus routes only in suburbs. There are also private bus and minibus services, which are not regulated by the B.B.A., provides regular routes in Bălți.

There are 3 trolleybus lines in Bălți, the fourth line being planned to be constructed in future. Most trolleybuses used by the Bălți Trolleybus Authority (B.T.A.) are different modifications of the Soviet ZiU-682, one Czech Škoda-14Tr13/6M, three Belarusian АКСМ–20101, and seven Russian Trans-Alfa 5298.00 (375).

| Line | | Length | In service from | Number of stations | Number of cars on route | Serviced by | Notes |
|---|---|---|---|---|---|---|---|
| 1 | Quarter "Molodova" – Airport Bălți-Oraș | 16.8 km (10.44 mi) | 1972 | 20 | 4 | B.T.A. | |
| 2 | North train station – Quarter "Dacia" | 17.0 km (10.56 mi) | 1972 | 30 | 16 | B.T.A. | |
| 3 | SA "Basarabia Nord" – Bus station | 14.0 km (8.70 mi) | 1972? | 14 | 8 | B.T.A. | |
| 4 | Center – Quarter "Dacia" | | | | | B.T.A. | Closed |
| 5 | Center – Airport Bălți-Oraș | | | | | B.T.A. | Closed |

Bălți offers a choice of taxi services, most of which operate for a fixed fee in the inner city. Three taxi companies are branches of Moldovan national companies, two taxi companies are Bălți registered businesses.

=== Road ===
Bălți is an important transportation hub of Moldova. The best inter-city transportation is done by coach or van (privately or publicly owned). 135 kilometres (84 miles) of Soviet-style highway (portions in good or fair condition) connect the city to the capital Chișinău. By road one can also reach Ukraine (in about 2 hours) to the north or to the east, and Romania (in about 1 hour) to the south-west by the Sculeni–Sculeni crossing point, which leads to the Romanian city of Iași (104 kilometres (65 miles) from Bălți), or to the west by the Stânca–Costești crossing.

The Bălți Inter-City Coach Station provides for regular bus connections throughout Moldova, as well as for numerous European and international connections (Eurolines).

=== Rail ===
Regular rail connections to Ocnița (north), Rezina (east) and Ungheni (south-east), as well as to Chișinău exists, however it takes today 6 hours to cover the 200 kilometres (124 miles) to Chișinău. The railway lines are not electrified, and contain only a single track between stations. Since Moldova gained independence, the railway lines became the responsibility of Calea Ferată din Moldova (Railways of Moldova) state company.

There are two railway stations: Bălți-City Station and Bălți-Slobozia Station (the name of a city neighbourhood), which both serve internal and international traffic.

=== Air ===
The city also has two operational airports. One of them, Bălți International Airport, 15 kilometres (9 miles) north of the city center (near the village of Corlăteni), was built in the 1980s, modern by Soviet standards, is officially certified. Large aircraft can land (one 2,200 meter runway), it operates both charter passenger and cargo flights. As of October 2007, it does not operate regular passenger flights.

A second airport, for small aircraft, Bălți City Airport, is located on the Eastern outskirts of the city. It was the most important airport in the surrounding region during World War II, but currently is only used for municipal and regional public services, agriculture, emergency services and pilot training.Now, there are developing an industrial area.

== Notable people ==
- Boris Anisfeld (1878–1973), Russian-American painter, stage designer, graphic artist and professor
- Natalia Barbu (born 1979), Moldovan singer and songwriter
- Gheorghe Briceag (1928 – 2008), Moldovan political prisoner, and human rights activist
- Geta Burlacu (born 1974), Moldovan singer
- Iosif Chișinevschi (1905–1963), Romanian communist politician
- Eugenio Coșeriu (1921–2002), Romanian linguist and founder of the School of Linguistics at Tübingen University
- Mikhaïl Faerman (born 1955), Soviet-born Belgian classical pianist
- Eugène Fidler (1910–1990), French painter and ceramicist
- Nicolae Filip (1926 – 2009), Moldovan physicist. professor and honorary member of the Academy of Sciences of Moldova
- Isa Kremer (1887–1956) Russian-American and Argentine soprano
- Yefim Krimerman (1923–2015) Moldovan Romanian‑language poet, journalist and broadcaster for Radio Free Europe
- Lia van Leer (1924–2015) Romanian-born Israeli arts administrator and film archivist
- Marian Lupu (born 1966), Moldovan economist and politician
- Riorita Paterău (born 1962), Moldovan musician and politician
- Ion Pelivan (1876–1954) Romanian jurist and politician
- Ștefan Pirogan (1898–1944) Romanian politician and Mayor of Bălți on four occasions during the period 1922–1932
- Vadim Pirogan (1921–2007) Moldovan activist, writer and political prisoner
- Sergiu Prodan (born 1963), Moldovan film director and Minister of Culture during 2021 to 2025
- Colea Răutu (1912–2008) Romanian actor
- Boris Sandler (born 1950) Moldovan-born Israeli Yiddish-language author, journalist, playwright, lyricist and editor
- Leonid Soybelman (born 1966), Moldovan musician and film composer based in Germany
- Nicolae Testemițanu (1927–1986), Moldovan and Soviet physician, surgeon, hygienist, and politician
- Vadim Vacarciuc (born 1972), Moldovan weightlifter
- Mihai Volontir (1934–2015), Moldovan and Soviet actor

== Trivia ==
- The famous Yiddish song Mein Shtetle Belz from 1932, written by Jacob Jacobs (theater) and composed by Alexander Olshanetsky for the play Ghetto Song, makes a reference to the old Jewish city of Bălți. It had been a tribute to the famous singer Isa Kremer, born in Bălți, and who was probably also the first one to perform it.

== International relations ==
=== Twin towns – sister cities ===
Bălți is twinned with:

- Arad, Israel
- Białystok, Poland
- Botoșani, Romania
- Chernivtsi, Ukraine
- Comrat, Moldova
- Gyula, Hungary
- İzmir, Turkey
- Jining, China
- Khmelnytskyi, Ukraine
- Lakeland, United States
- Larissa, Greece
- Livny, Russia
- Miercurea Ciuc, Romania
- Mohyliv-Podilskyi, Ukraine
- Narva, Estonia
- Nizhny Novgorod, Russia
- Orsha, Belarus
- Płock, Poland
- Podolsk, Russia
- Polotsk, Belarus
- Pushkin (Saint Petersburg), Russia
- Rechytsa, Belarus
- Smolyan, Bulgaria
- Stryi, Ukraine
- Suceava, Romania
- Vinnytsia, Ukraine
- Vitebsk, Belarus
- Western Administrative Okrug (Moscow), Russia
- Wuzhong, China
- Zapadnoye Degunino District (Moscow), Russia

=== Consulates ===
- Consulate-General of Romania, address: 51, Sfântul Nicolae Str.
- Consulate of Ukraine, address: 143, Kiev Str.
- Honorary Consulate of Austria, address: 47, Mihai Viteazul Str.
