= Eugenio Coșeriu =

Romanian linguist (1921–2002)

- Eugen Coșeriu
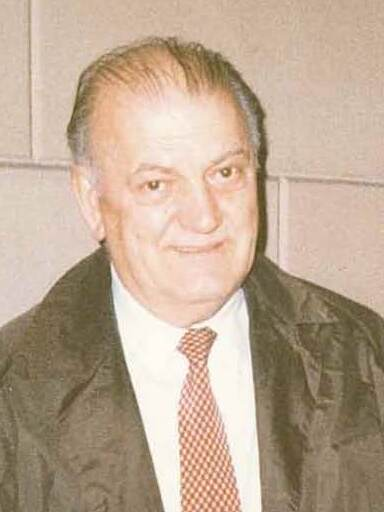
- Coșeriu in 1989
- Born: Eugen Coșeriu; July 27, 1921; Mihăileni, Kingdom of Romania (present-day Republic of Moldova)
- Died: September 7, 2002 (aged 81); Tübingen, Germany
- Occupation: Professor

Academic background
- Education: University of Iași; Sapienza University of Rome; University of Milan

Academic work
- Discipline: Linguistics
- Institutions: University of the Republic (Uruguay); University of Tübingen
- Website: www.coseriu.de

Eugenio Coșeriu (Romanian: Eugen Coșeriu, pronounced [e.uˈdʒen koˈʃerju]; 27 July 1921 – 7 September 2002) was a Moldovan-born Romanian linguist who specialized in Romance languages at the University of Tübingen, author of over 50 books, and honorary member of the Romanian Academy.

In 1970 he coined the terms diatopic, diastratic and diaphasic to describe linguistic variation.

== Biography ==
Coșeriu was born on July 27, 1921, in Mihăileni, a small Romanian town that today lies in the Republic of Moldova. He attended high school in Bălți, where Vadim Pirogan and Sergiu Grossu were his classmates. After his studies at the University of Iași, he went to Italy in 1940 with a scholarship of the Istituto Italiano di Cultura and continued to study at Sapienza University of Rome, where he earned his PhD in 1944 under the direction of Giovanni Maver, with a dissertation about the influence of the Chanson de geste on the folk poetry of the South Slavic peoples. In 1944–1945 Coșeriu was at the University of Padua, then from 1945 to 1949 at the University of Milan, where he obtained a PhD degree in philosophy, under the supervision of Antonio Banfi.

Coșeriu was active at the University of the Republic in Uruguay as Professor of General and Indo-European Linguistics from 1950 to 1958. He then held visiting positions at the University of Málaga and the University of Navarra and a teaching position at the University of Coimbra. From 1961 to 1963 he was invited professor at the University of Bonn and the University of Frankfurt, after which he moved permanently to the University of Tübingen, where he held the Professor of Romance Linguistics position until his retirement in 1991.

He was elected honorary member of the Romanian Academy in 1991.

== Architecture of language ==
One of Coșeriu's most significant contributions to the field of Romance language linguistics is his notion of the architecture of language, used to describe the various varieties that make up an individual language. Coșeriu's model describes three types of language varieties:

- diatopic varieties, based on geography. This term corresponds to dialects in English-language literature.
- diastratic varieties, based on social class. This term corresponds to sociolects in English-language literature and has been expanded beyond the class category to include all social groups.
- diaphasic varieties, based on situation. This term corresponds to registers in English-language literature.

== Honours ==
- Biblioteca Municipală "Eugeniu Coșeriu", Bălți
- Colocviul Internațional de științe ale Limbajului "Eugeniu Coșeriu"
- "Eugen Coșeriu" High School Mihăileni, Bălți

== Selected works ==
- (in Spanish) Eugeniu Coșeriu, Teoría del lenguaje y lingüística general, Madrid, 1973
- (in Spanish) Eugeniu Coșeriu, Sincronía, diacronía e historia, Madrid, 1973
- (in Spanish) Eugeniu Coșeriu, Principios de semántica estructural, Madrid, 1978.
- (in Spanish) Eugeniu Coșeriu, El hombre y su lenguaje: estudios de teoría y metodología lingüística, Madrid, 1985.
- (in Spanish) Eugeniu Coșeriu, Tradición y novedad en la ciencia del lenguaje, Madrid, 1977.
- (in Spanish) Eugeniu Coșeriu, Gramatica, semántica, universales, Madrid, 1978.
- (in Romanian) Eugeniu Coșeriu, Lecții de lingvistică generală, Chișinău, ARC Publishing House, 2000.
- (in Romanian) Eugeniu Coșeriu, "Limbaj și politică", in Revista de lingvistică și știință literară, 5/1996.
- (in Romanian) Eugeniu Coșeriu, „Latinitatea orientală”, in Limba Română este patria mea. Studii. Comunicări. Documente, Chișinău, 1996, pp. 15–31.
- (in Romanian) Eugeniu Coșeriu, „Unitatea limbii române – planuri și criterii”. Ibidem. p. 205-121.
- (in English) Eugeniu Coșeriu and Horst Geckeler. Trends in structural semantics. (Tübinger Beiträge zur Linguistik, 158). Tübingen: Narr. 1981.
