= Muzeul Memoriei Neamului =

Museum in Moldova

Coordinates: 47°1′29″N 28°49′57″E

Museum of National Memory
- Muzeul Memoriei Neamului
- Established: 1990s April 23, 2002
- Location: 4 Costache Negruzzi Street, Chișinău
- Director: Anatol Corj
- President: Vadim Pirogan
- Curators: Teodosia Cosmin; Elena Postică
- Website: memoria.ro/mmn/index.html

Muzeul Memoriei Neamului (Romanian; Museum of National Memory) is a private museum in Chișinău, Moldova, dedicated to the victims of the Soviet Occupation of Bessarabia and Northern Bukovina, and commemorating anti-communist resistance in the region.

== Overview ==
Founded by the former political prisoner and dissident Vadim Pirogan, the museum is located on str. Costache Negruzzi no 4 and is supported by the Association of the Victims of the Communist Regime and of the War Veterans of the Romanian Army, a Moldovan NGO.

In the 1990s, Mihai Ursache, a member in the 1940s of the resistance organization "Arcașii lui Ștefan" in occupied Bessarabia, founded a small museum in two rooms at 52 Kogălniceanu Street. The association was disbanded and its exhibits stored in the basement of the National History Museum. After 3–4 years, Vadim Pirogan, a former political prisoner condemned by the Soviets in 1941 to five years of forced labor at camps in the Irkutsk region, decided to rebuild the museum together with Nicholas Caireac in a 70 m^{2} room that they rented.

On June 30, 2010, the First Vlad Filat Cabinet, decided to create a separate Museum of Victims of Communism; however, such a museum has not been inaugurated.

== Gallery ==
Mihail Ursachi and Vladimir Pătraşcu

== See also ==
- Commission for the Study of the Communist Dictatorship in Moldova
