= Vadim Pirogan =

Bessarabian activist and author

Vadim Pirogan OR
- Born: 26 June 1921; Bălţi
- Died: 16 January 2007 (aged 85); Chişinău
- Resting place: Chişinău
- Education: Lviv Polytechnic
- Known for: Muzeul Memoriei Neamului
- Spouse: Veronica
- Children: 3
- Parent: Ştefan Pirogan

Vadim Pirogan (28 June 1921 – 16 January 2007) was a Bessarabian activist and author. He was the head of the Communist Regime Victims Association and a member of the Moldovan Writers' Union.

== Biography ==
Vadim Pirogan was born on 28 June 1921 in Bălţi. His father Ştefan Pirogan was mayor of Bălţi in 1923–1934. He attended high school there, having Eugen Coşeriu, Sergiu Grossu, Valeriu Gafencu, Ovidiu Creangă, and Valentin Mândâcanu as his classmates Vadim Pirogan was arrested by the Soviet authorities on 25 June 1941 and for five years, he was imprisoned in Siberia in the Tayshet forced labour camp.

Vadim Pirogan married Veronica in 1952. He graduated from Lviv Polytechnic. He lived in Lviv until 1989, when he moved to Chişinău. In 2002 he founded there the Muzeul Memoriei Neamului, 'The Museum of National Remembrance'. He was the president of the Communist Regime Victims Association (Romanian: Asociaţia Victimelor Regimului Communist si a Veteranilor de Razboi ai Armatei Romane din Republica Moldova) beginning in 1999.

== Works ==
- Vadim Pirogan, Cu gandul la tine, Basarabia mea
- Vadim Pirogan, Pe drumurile pribegiei
- Vadim Pirogan, Timpuri si oameni
- Vadim Pirogan and Boris Movila, Destine romanesti
- Vadim Pirogan, Calvarul

== See also ==
- Muzeul Memoriei Neamului
