= Sts. Constantine and Helen Cathedral, Bălți =

Coordinates: 47.7545°N 27.9202°E

Sts. Constantine and Helen Cathedral
- Catedrala Sfinții Împărați Constantin și Elena
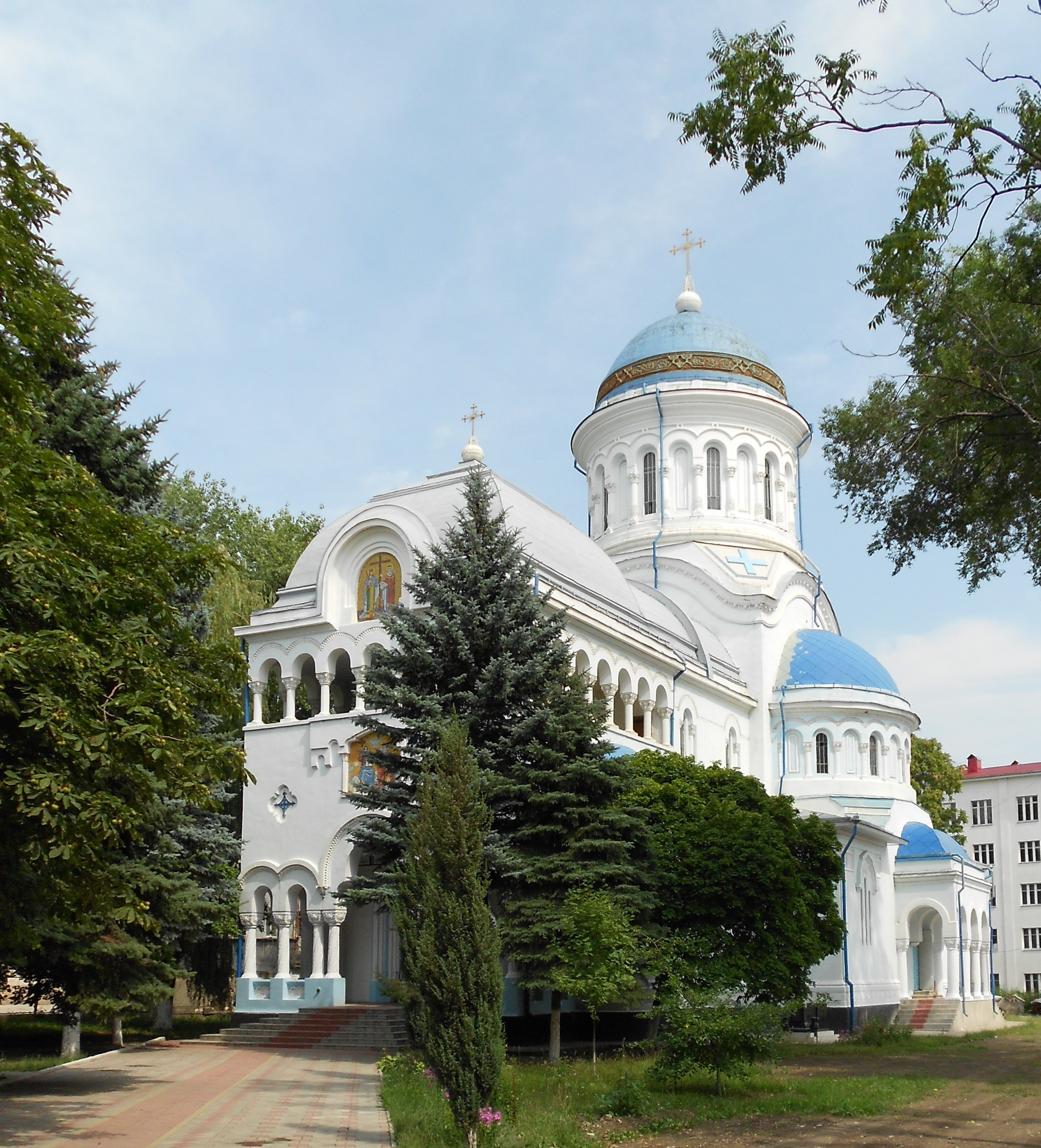
- Sts. Constantine and Helen Cathedral
- Location: Bălți
- Country: Moldova
- Denomination: Eastern Orthodox

History
- Status: Cathedral
- Consecrated: June 2, 1935

Architecture
- Architect(s): Adrian Gabrilescu and Andrei Ivanov
- Style: Romanian Revival architecture
- Completed: 1934

The Sts. Constantine and Helen Cathedral (Romanian: Catedrala Sfinții Împărați Constantin și Elena) is a cathedral in Bălți, Moldova.

== History ==
The cornerstone was laid on September 24, 1924, by Bishop Visarion Puiu of Hotin with the future King Carol II of Romania, Patriarch Miron of Romania, Patriarch Damian of Jerusalem, Metropolitan Pimen Georgescu of Moldavia, and Metropolitan Gurie Grosu of Bessarabia. Between 1923 and 1935, Visarion Puiu was bishop of Hotin, his seat being in Bălți.

The cathedral was built in Neo-Romanian style. The consecration of the Sts. Constantine and Helen Cathedral took place in Bălți on June 2, 1935. The Ecumenical Patriarch Photius II of Constantinople was represented by the Metropolitan of Australia Timotheos Evangelinidis. The consecration ceremony was also attended by the King Carol II and son, future King Michael I of Romania.

The building survived the harsh treatment during the Soviet era almost without visible effects, when it was for most of the time a depot, later to be turned into the municipal museum.

== Gallery ==
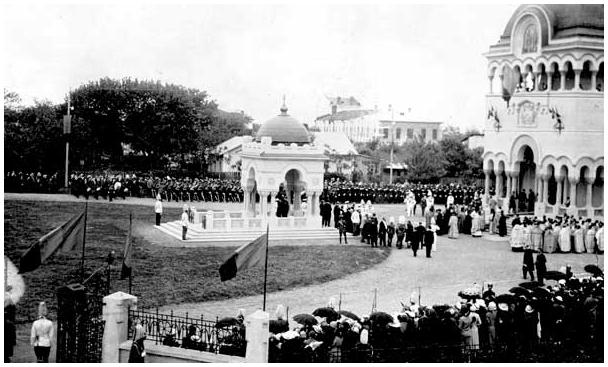
The consecration, June 2, 1935

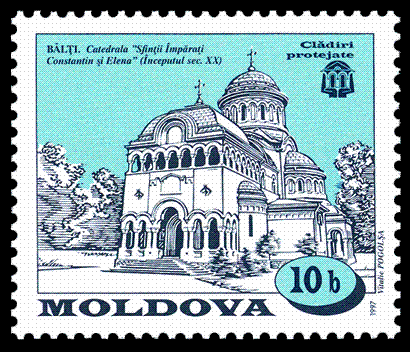
1996 stamp
