= Fidesco Group =

Retail supermarket chain

Fidesco, Ltd.
- Company type: Discount department store
- Industry: Retail
- Founded: Chişinău, Moldova (1992)
- Headquarters: Chişinău, Bălţi Moldova
- Products: Discount stores, grocery stores, and hypermarkets Optical, Pharmacy, Portrait Studio
- Revenue: ▲MDL 632,80 mln (2018)
- Net income: ▲MDL 28,38 mln (2018)
- Number of employees: 754 (2018)
- Website: www.fidesco.md

The Fidesco Group is one of the first and largest retail supermarket chains in Moldova. Fidesco Group was founded in 1992. Its main activity is import and retail/wholesale of food products. The legal form of ownership is a limited company, 100% owned by private capital. Currently, the Fidesco group includes 35 stores in Chișinău, Ialoveni, Orhei, Călărași, Căușeni, Comrat, Ceadîr-Lunga, Tvardița and Anenii Noi.

The company is managed by Galina Falo and was founded by Grigore Aizin, Mihail Aizin, Igor Chinah, Vasilii Ribacov and Oleg Tarasov.
