= Vasile Alecsandri National Theatre (Bălți) =

Coordinates: 47.7603°N 27.9250°E

- Teatrul Național „Vasile Alecsandri” din Bălți
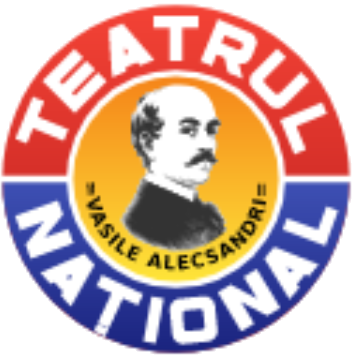

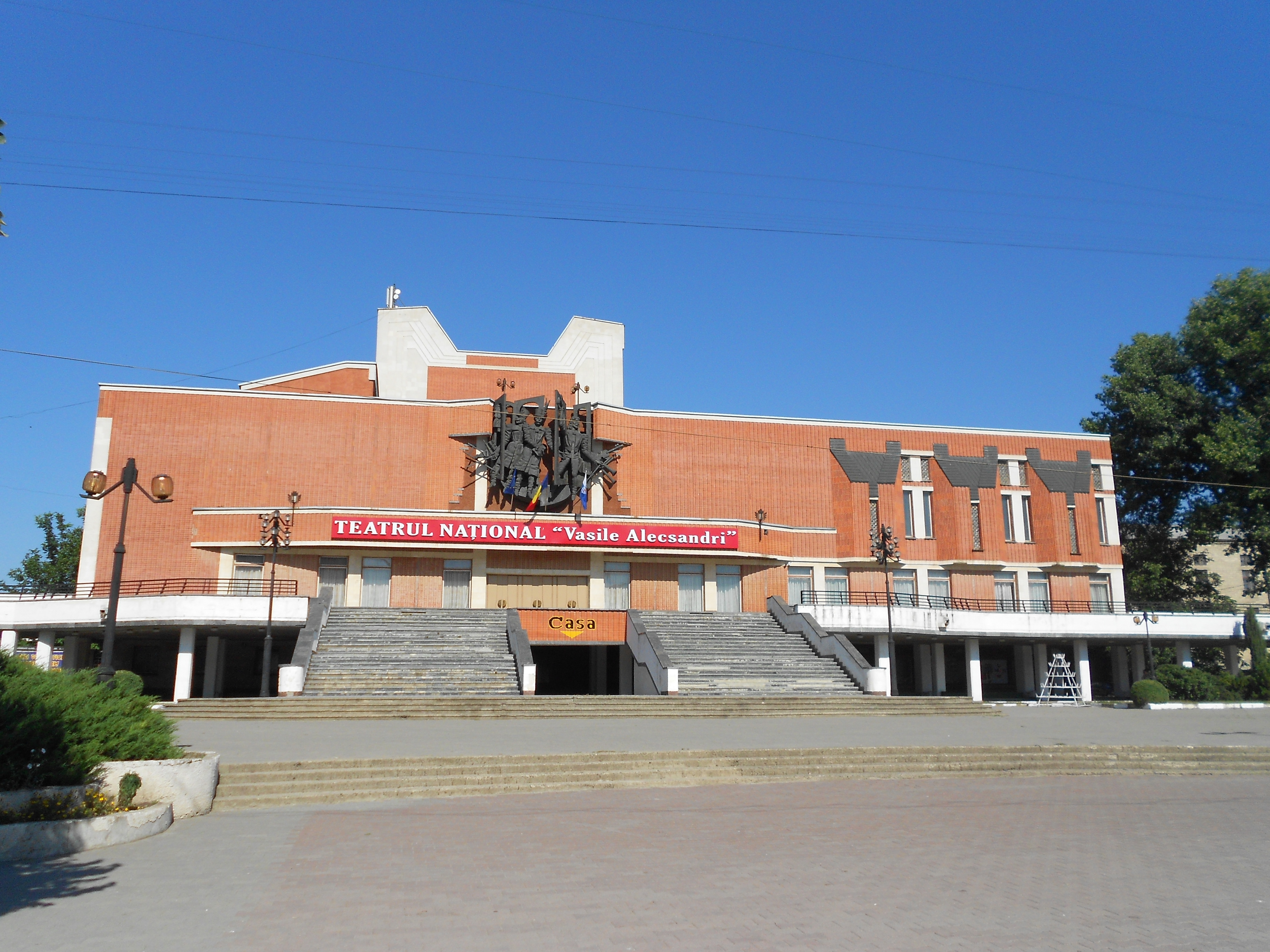
- Interactive map of Vasile Alecsandri National Theatre
- Address: Bălți; Moldova
- Owner: Ministry of Culture
- Capacity: 584 (Main hall)
- Type: National theatre
- Current use: live theatre

Construction
- Opened: 19 May 1991
- Architect: Ianina Galperina

Website
- tnb.md

The Vasile Alecsandri National Theatre (Romanian: Teatrul Național „Vasile Alecsandri” din Bălți) in Bălți, is one of the national theatres of Moldova. Founded in 1957, it was given the name of the renowned Romanian playwright and poet Vasile Alecsandri. On 26 January 1990, Vasile Alecsandri Theatre became the first national theatre in Moldova.
