= Mayor of Bălți =

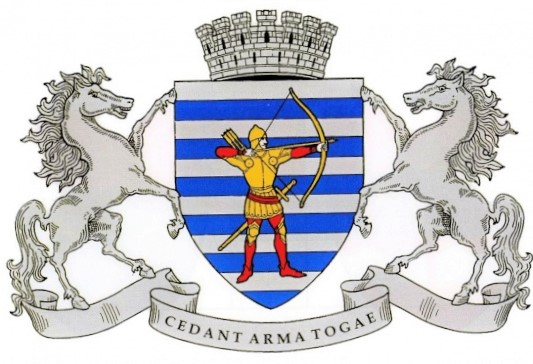
- Official seal of Bălți

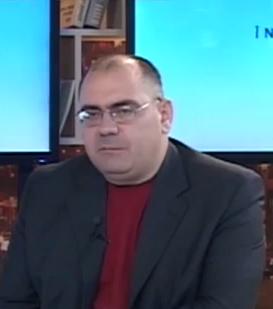
- Incumbent; Alexandr Petkov since 19 November 2023
- Appointer: Direct popular vote
- Term length: 4 years

The Mayor of Bălți is head of the executive branch of Bălți City Council.

== List of mayors ==
Mayors of Bălți:

Name	Period
Dimitrie Dobriș	1918
Dumitru Vrabie	1918 - ?
Ștefan Pirogan (1)	1922–1924
Ștefan Sadovici	1924–1925
Traian Bonciu	1925–1926
Ștefan Pirogan (2)	1927
Iacob Cociorva (1)	1927–1929
Ștefan Pirogan (3)	1929
Ștefan Pirogan (4)	1931–1932
Mihai Cucer (1)	1932
Krupovetkin	1932
Iacob Cociorva (2)	1933–1934
Petru Vrabie	1934–1937
Mihai Cucer (2)	1937–1938
Constantin Satmari	1938–1939
Iacob Cociorva (3)	1939–1940
Teodor Ardeleanu	1941–1943
colonel M. Anghelescu	1943–1944
Grigore Borodin	1945–1950
Vasile Gherasimenco	1950–1953
Petru Poloz	1953–1958
Ivan Cuschevici	1961–1964
Petru Petrușin	1965–1973
Anatolii Guharac	1973–1976
Vasile Iovv	1976–1980
Gheorghe Gusac	1980–1985
Vladimir Molojen	1985–1987
Victor Morev (1)	1987–1990
Vladimir Tonciuc	1990–1995
Victor Morev (2)	1995–2001
Vasile Panciuc (1)	2001–2011
Octavian Mahu (acting)	2011
Vasile Panciuc (2)	2011–2015
Renato Usatîi (1)	2015–2018
Nicolai Grigorișin (1)	2018–2019
Renato Usatîi (2)	2019–2021
Nicolai Grigorișin (2)	2021–2023
Alexandr Petkov	2023–present
