= Ștefan Pirogan =

Romanian politician (1898–1944)

Ştefan Pirogan
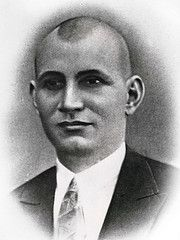

Mayor of Bălţi
- In office 1922–1924
- Preceded by: Dumitru Vrabie
- Succeeded by: Ștefan Sadovici
- In office 1927–1927
- Preceded by: Traian Bonciu
- Succeeded by: Iacob Cociorva
- In office 1929–1929
- Preceded by: Iacob Cociorva
- In office 1931–1932
- Succeeded by: Mihai Cucer

Personal details
- Born: Rădoaia
- Died: 1944 Ivdel
- Party: National Peasants' Party
- Children: Vadim Pirogan, Anatoly Pirogan

Ştefan Pirogan (1898 – 1944) was a Romanian politician. He served as Mayor of Bălţi (1922–1924, 1927, 1929, 1931–1932). After the Soviet occupation of Bessarabia, Pirogan was arrested on 13 June 1941 and deported. Ştefan Pirogan was 52 when he died at Ivdel.

== Bibliography ==
- Pe Drumurile Pribegiei by Vadim Ştefan Pirogan Hardcover, Tip. Centrala, ISBN 9975-78-010-5 (9975-78-010-5) Moldavian
- Destine Romanesti by Vadim Ştefan Pirogan, Boris Movila; Hardcover, Tip. Centrala, ISBN 9975-78-236-1 (9975-78-236-1)
