= Southwind Airlines =

Turkish airline

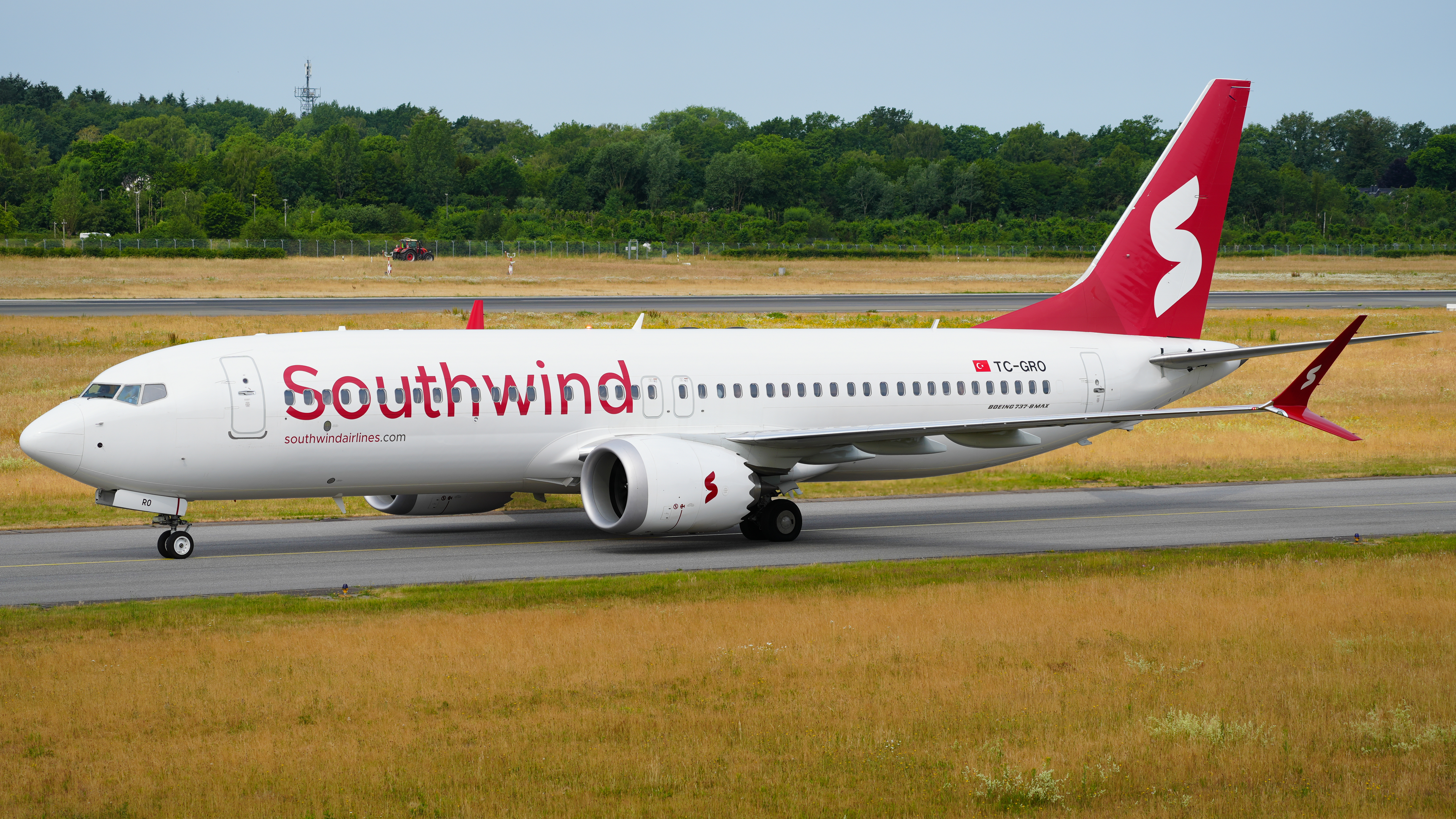
- Southwind Airlines 737-8 in standard livery
| IATA | ICAO | Call sign |
|---|---|---|
| 2S | STW | MOON STAR |
- Founded: April 2022; 4 years ago
- Hubs: Antalya Airport
- Fleet size: 14
- Destinations: 20
- Headquarters: Antalya, Turkey
- Key people: Şükrü Can (CEO)
- Website: southwindairlines.com

Southwind Airlines is a Turkish leisure airline founded in April 2022 by Cortex Havacılık ve Turizm Ticaret A.Ş. Flights to Russia commenced in August of that year, while Germany was added to its network a month later. The airline's main base and headquarters are in Antalya. The airline was banned from EU airspace in March 2024, but this ban was lifted in December 2024. It is suspected of being related to Russian Nordwind Airlines, with which it shares some of the crews and planes.

== History ==
=== Foundation ===
Southwind Airlines was formally announced in April 2022, based out of Antalya, Turkey. The airline aims to prevent the loss of Russian tourists coming to Turkey following the Russian invasion of Ukraine. The airline received preclearance from the Directorate General of Civil Aviation in June of that year. The first commercial flight was flown to Perm on 12 August.

Charter flights to Germany commenced in September 2022. In February 2023, the airline announced plans to carry tourists to Antalya from 16 Russian cities during the summer season. The number of aircraft in the fleet is expected to be 14 by the end of 2023.

In July 2024, Southwind Airlines joined IATA.

=== EU airspace ban and lifting ===
On 25 March 2024, Southwind Airlines was banned by the Finnish Transport and Communications Agency from operating flights to Finland. According to the agency, Southwind Airlines is a de facto Russian airline attempting to circumvent European Union sanctions against Russia, imposed in response to Russia's military aggression against Ukraine.

Following the Finnish assessment, the airline was banned on 28 March 2024 from the entire EU airspace, subject to regulation No 833/2014. The airline was to begin flights under its own brand to several airports in the United Kingdom in summer 2024 as well, which however were all subsequently also cancelled. Shortly after, Switzerland formally banned the airline as well.

However, in the next publication on December 13 2024, Southwind Airlines was removed from the List.

== Destinations ==
Southwind Airlines operates flights to the following destinations:

| Country | City | Airport | Notes | Refs |
|---|---|---|---|---|
| Bahrain | Manama | Bahrain International Airport | | |
| Belarus | Minsk | Minsk National Airport | Terminated | |
| Germany | Berlin | Berlin Brandenburg Airport | Terminated | |
| Germany | Düsseldorf | Düsseldorf Airport | Terminated | |
| Germany | Hamburg | Hamburg Airport | Terminated | |
| Germany | Hanover | Hannover Airport | Terminated | |
| Germany | Leipzig | Leipzig/Halle Airport | Terminated | |
| Germany | Munich | Munich Airport | Terminated | |
| Germany | Nuremberg | Nuremberg Airport | Terminated | |
| Germany | Stuttgart | Stuttgart Airport | Terminated | |
| Greece | Heraklion | Heraklion International Airport | Terminated | |
| Israel | Tel Aviv | Ben Gurion Airport | Terminated | |
| Italy | Bergamo | Orio al Serio International Airport | Terminated | |
| Kazakhstan | Astana | Nursultan Nazarbayev International Airport | | |
| Lebanon | Beirut | Beirut–Rafic Hariri International Airport | | |
| Moldova | Chișinău | Chișinău International Airport | Terminated | |
| North Macedonia | Skopje | Skopje International Airport | Terminated | |
| Russia | Arkhangelsk | Talagi Airport | Seasonal charter | |
| Russia | Irkutsk | International Airport Irkutsk | Seasonal charter | |
| Russia | Kaliningrad | Khrabrovo Airport | Terminated | |
| Russia | Kazan | Ğabdulla Tuqay Kazan International Airport | Seasonal charter | |
| Russia | Krasnodar | Krasnodar International Airport | Seasonal charter | |
| Russia | Krasnoyarsk | Krasnoyarsk International Airport | | |
| Russia | Moscow | Sheremetyevo International Airport | Seasonal charter | |
| Russia | Moscow | Zhukovsky International Airport | Seasonal charter | |
| Russia | Nizhny Novgorod | Strigino International Airport | Seasonal charter | |
| Russia | Novosibirsk | Tolmachevo Airport | Seasonal charter | |
| Russia | Orenburg | Orenburg Airport | Seasonal charter | |
| Russia | Perm | Bolshoye Savino Airport | Seasonal charter | |
| Russia | Saint Petersburg | Pulkovo Airport | Seasonal charter | |
| Russia | Samara | Kurumoch International Airport | Seasonal charter | |
| Russia | Saratov | Saratov Gagarin Airport | Seasonal charter | |
| Russia | Sochi | Sochi International Airport | Seasonal charter | |
| Russia | Ufa | Mustai Karim Ufa International Airport | Seasonal charter | |
| Russia | Volgograd | Gumrak Airport | Seasonal charter | |
| Russia | Yekaterinburg | Koltsovo International Airport | Seasonal charter | |
| Switzerland | Zürich | Zurich Airport | Terminated | |
| Switzerland; France; Germany | Basel; Mulhouse; Freiburg | EuroAirport Basel Mulhouse Freiburg | Terminated | |
| Turkey | Antalya | Antalya Airport | Hub | |
| Turkey | Bodrum | Milas-Bodrum Airport | Seasonal charter | |
| Turkey | Dalaman | Dalaman Airport | Seasonal charter | |
| Turkey | Istanbul | Istanbul Airport | | |
| Turkey | Trabzon | Trabzon Airport | | |

== Fleet ==
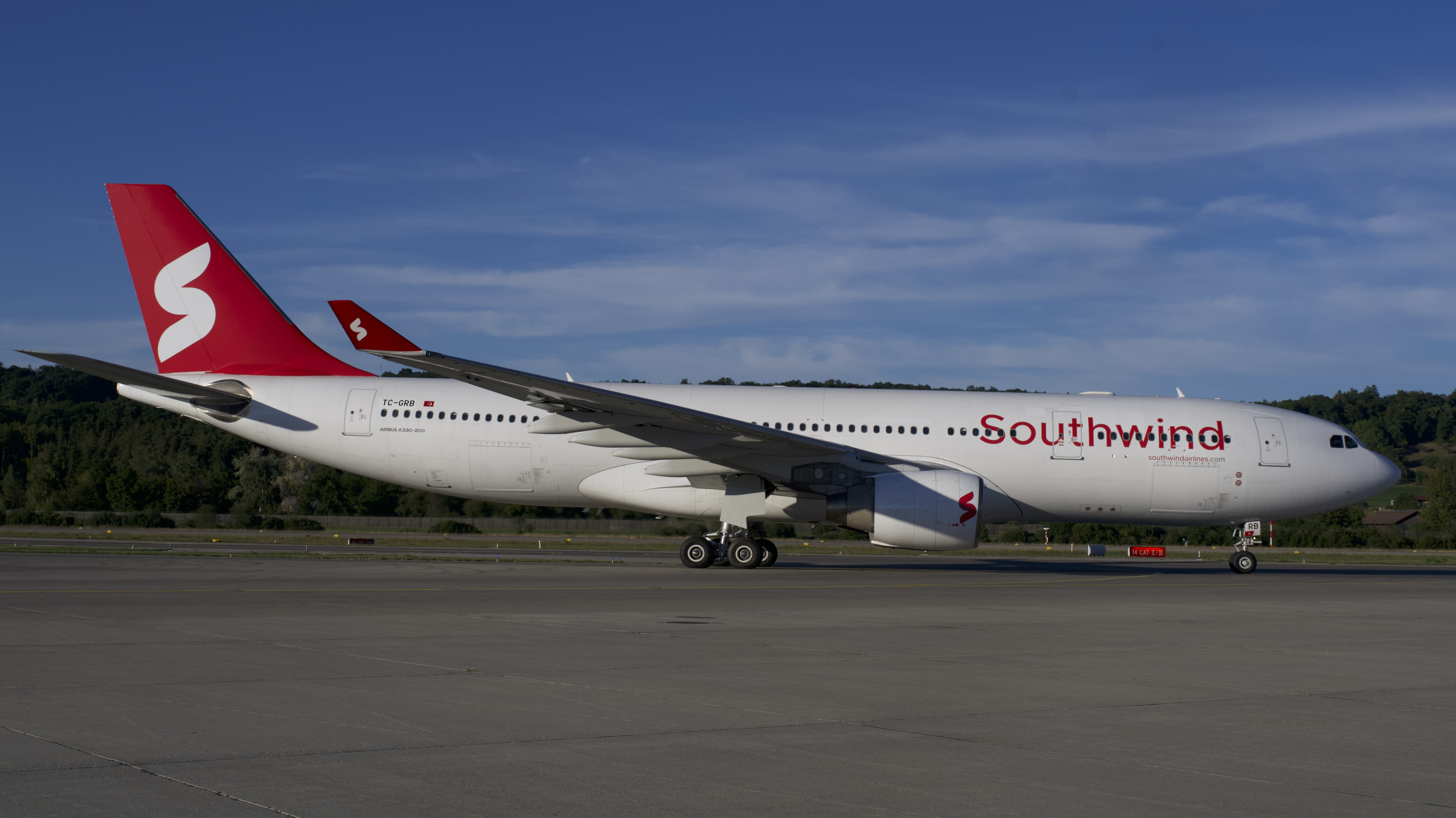
Southwind Airbus A330-200

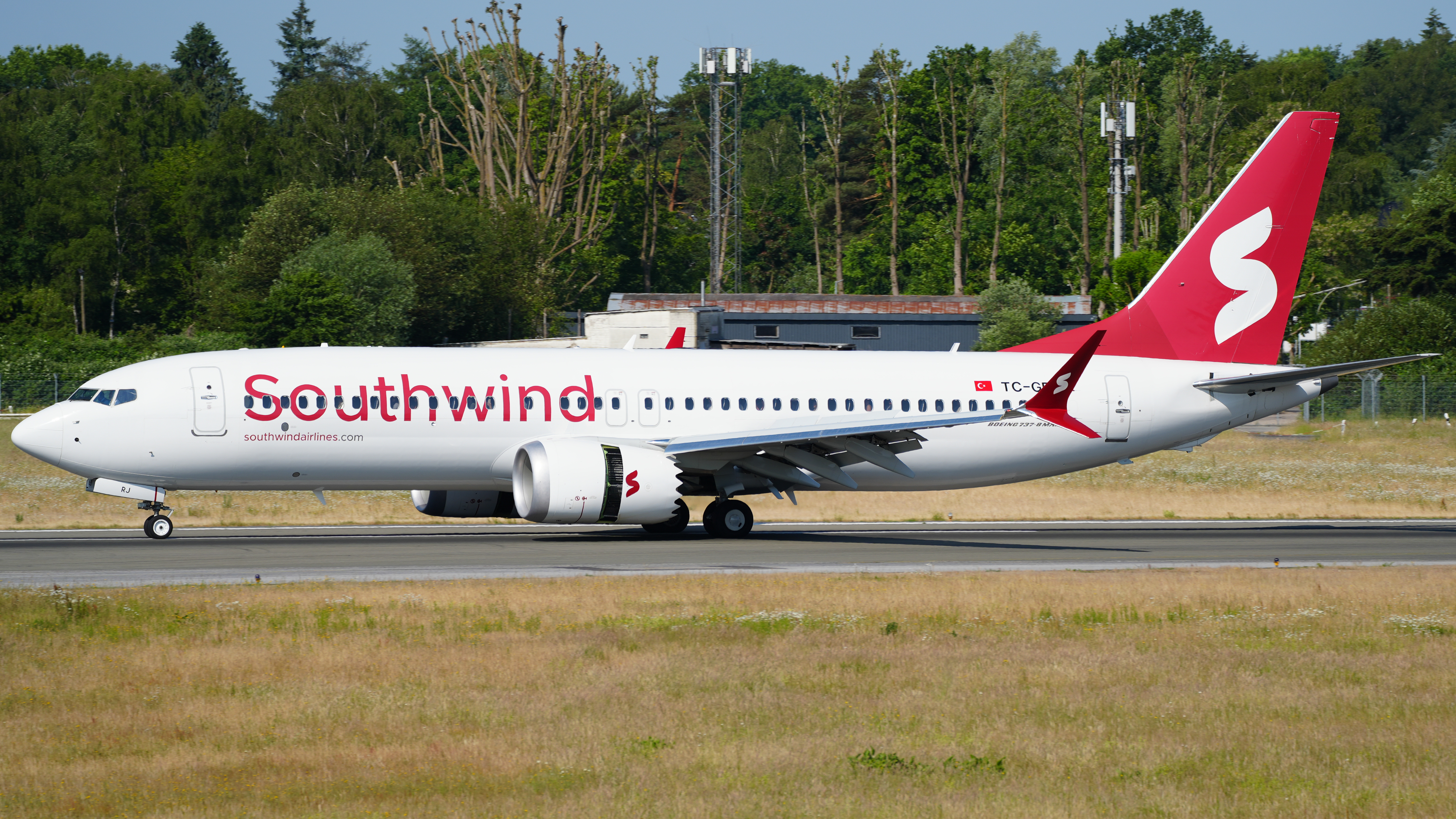
Southwind Boeing 737 MAX 8

Southwind Boeing 777-300

As of August 2025, Southwind Airlines operates the following aircraft:

Southwind Airlines fleet
| Aircraft | In service | Orders | Passengers | Notes |
|---|---|---|---|---|
| Airbus A321-200 | 4 | — | 220 | |
| Airbus A321neo | 1 | — | 240 | |
| Airbus A330-200 | 2 | — | 353 | |
| Boeing 737 MAX 8 | 3 | — | 189 | |
| Boeing 777-300 | 3 | — | 550 | Highest density 777s in the world. |
| Boeing 777-300ER | 1 | — | 531 | |
| Total | 14 | — | | |

== See also ==
- List of airlines of Turkey
