= Antalya Airport =

Airport serving Antalya, Turkey

Antalya Airport Antalya Havalimanı
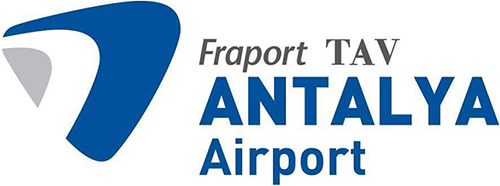

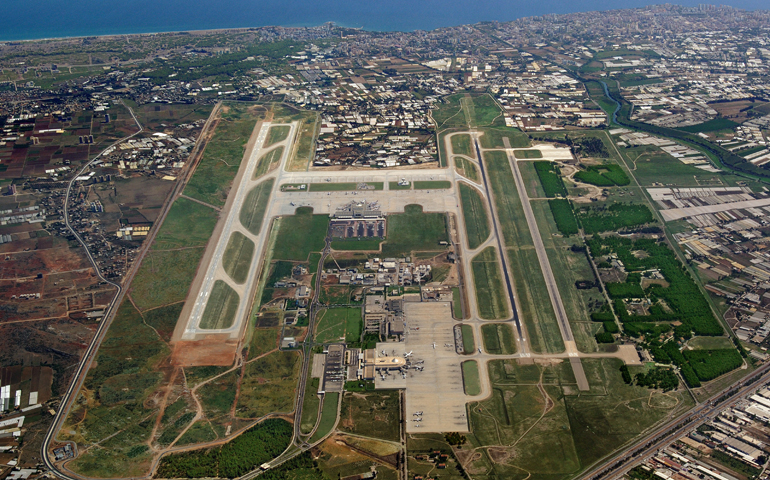
- IATA: AYT; ICAO: LTAI

Summary
- Airport type: Public
- Owner: General Directorate of State Airports (DHMİ)
- Operator: Fraport TAV Antalya Airport Terminal A.S.
- Serves: Antalya, Turkey
- Location: Muratpaşa, Antalya, Turkey
- Opened: 1960; 66 years ago
- Focus city for: Turkish Airlines
- Operating base for: AJet; Corendon Airlines; Freebird Airlines; Pegasus Airlines; SunExpress; Mavi Gök Airlines; Southwind Airlines
- Elevation AMSL: 177 ft (54 m)
- Coordinates: 36°54′01″N 30°47′34″E
- Website: www.antalya-airport.aero

Map
- Location of airport in Turkey AYT/LTAI (Asia) AYT/LTAI (Mediterranean)

Runways
Direction	Length		Surface
Direction	m	ft	Surface
18L/36R	3,400	11,154	Concrete
18C/36C	3,400	11,154	Concrete
18R/36L	2,990	9,809	Asphalt

Statistics (2025)
- Annual passenger capacity: 82,000,000
- Passengers: 39,000,177
- Passenger change 2024–25: ▲2%
- Aircraft movements: 240,141
- Movements change 2024–25: ▲3%
- Source: Turkish AIP at EUROCONTROL; Passenger Traffic, ACI Europe

Antalya Airport (IATA: AYT, ICAO: LTAI) is a major international airport located 13 km (8.1 mi) northeast of the city centre of Antalya, Turkey. It is a major destination during the European summer leisure season due to its location at the country's Mediterranean coast. It handled over 39.0 million passengers in 2025, making it the third-busiest airport in Turkey, and the 7th busiest airport in the Middle East (as of 2025). The airport has two international terminals and one domestic terminal. The airport and its flights are estimated to have emitted 1.87 million tonnes of greenhouse gas in 2023.

== History ==
In July 2011, the airport was selected as Best Airport in Europe (10–25-million-passenger category) by Airports Council International (ACI).

In 2003, the airport handled 10 million passengers, representing an increase of 78% since 1998. According to ACI statistics, Antalya Airport ranked 30th in 2005, 2008 and 2009 for international passenger traffic. In 2009, AYT also held its 30th spot in that category among world airports, with 15,210,733 international passengers. By the end of 2010, it rose to the 23rd spot with over 18 million international passengers.

A new airport is due to open west of Antalya, close to Kaş.

IFC is financing the expansion and modernization of Antalya Airport in Türkiye by providing a €150 million loan to Fraport TAV, as part of a broader €1.9 billion investment involving several other financial institutions. The initiative's stated aims are to enhance Turkey’s competitiveness in global tourism, improve transportation connectivity, and bolster economic recovery post-COVID-19. The IFC stated it wishes to reduce carbon emissions in order to achieve LEED Gold certification for the airport.

== Terminals ==
There are three terminals at the airport, Terminal 1, Terminal 2, and the Domestic Terminal.

== Airlines and destinations ==
The following airlines operate regular scheduled and charter flights at Antalya Airport:

Airlines	Destinations
Aeroflot	Moscow-Sheremetyevo, Krasnodar; Seasonal: Perm
Air Anka	Seasonal charter: Düsseldorf, Frankfurt, Krasnodar, Sochi
Air Astana	Almaty, Astana
Air Baltic	Seasonal: Riga
Air Cairo	Seasonal: Cairo
AJet	Ankara, Düsseldorf, Istanbul–Sabiha Gökçen; Seasonal: Hannover, Sarajevo
Azerbaijan Airlines	Baku
azimuth	Krasnodar
Azur Air	Seasonal charter: Arkhangelsk-Talagi, Kazan, Krasnodar, Moscow-Vnukovo, Nishny Novgorod, Novosibirsk, Orenburg, Perm, Samara, Surgut, Syktyvkar, Tyumen, Yekaterinburg
Belavia	Seasonal charter: Brest, Homiel, Minsk, Mahilyow, Vitsyebsk
Centrum Air	Tashkent
British Airways	Seasonal: London–Gatwick
Brussels Airlines	Seasonal: Brussels
Buzz	Seasonal charter: Kraków
Corendon Airlines	Cologne/Bonn, Dresden, Düsseldorf, Erfurt-Weimar, Hamburg, Hannover, Leipzig/Halle, Munich, Paderborn/Lippstadt, Rostock, Warsaw–Chopin; Seasonal: Basel/Mulhouse, Berlin, Birmingham, Bremen, Bucharest–Otopeni, Frankfurt, Friedrichshafen, Glasgow, London–Gatwick, London–Stansted, Manchester, Münster/Osnabrück, Newcastle upon Tyne, Salzburg, Stuttgart, Vienna, Zürich; Seasonal charter: Orenburg, Piešťany
Corendon Dutch Airlines	Seasonal: Amsterdam, Maastricht/Aachen, Rotterdam/The Hague
easyJet	Birmingham, Bristol, Edinburgh, Glasgow, Liverpool, London–Gatwick, London–Luton, London–Southend, Manchester, Newcastle upon Tyne; Seasonal: Basel/Mulhouse, Belfast–International, Berlin, Geneva
Edelweiss Air	Seasonal: Zürich
Eurowings	Seasonal: Cologne/Bonn, Düsseldorf, Stuttgart
Finnair	Seasonal: Helsinki
Fly Lili	Seasonal charter: Bucharest–Băneasa
Flyadeal	Seasonal: Riyadh
FlyArystan	Seasonal: Qarağandy, Qyzylorda
Flydubai	Seasonal: Dubai–International
Freebird Airlines	Seasonal: Berlin, Chișinău, Cologne/Bonn, Düsseldorf, Erfurt-Weimar, Hamburg, Hannover, Leipzig/Halle, Memmingen, Munich, Paderborn/Lippstadt, Stuttgart, Weeze
IrAero	Seasonal charter: Krasnodar
Jazeera Airways	Kuwait City
Jet2.com	Birmingham, Bristol, East Midlands, Edinburgh, Glasgow, Leeds/Bradford, Liverpool, London–Gatwick, London–Luton, London–Stansted, Manchester, Newcastle upon Tyne; Seasonal: Belfast–International, Bournemouth
Luxair	Seasonal: Luxembourg
Mavi Gök Airlines	Seasonal: London–Gatwick; Seasonal charter: Erfurt-Weimar, Palanga, Saarbrücken
Norwegian Air Shuttle	Oslo, Stockholm–Arlanda; Seasonal: Bergen, Stavanger
Pegasus Airlines	Adana/Mersin, Almaty, Amman–Queen Alia, Amsterdam, Ankara, Baku, Charleroi, Cologne/Bonn, Dubai–International, Düsseldorf, Elazığ, Ercan, Frankfurt, Istanbul–Sabiha Gökçen, Kayseri, London–Stansted, Sofia, Stockholm–Arlanda, Tirana, Trabzon; Seasonal: Aalborg, Aarhus, Basel/Mulhouse, Billund, Bremen, Bucharest–Otopeni, Copenhagen, Dortmund, Dresden, Erfurt-Weimar, Geneva, Giza, Graz, Gothenburg, Hamburg, Hannover, Helsinki, Maastricht, Munich, Münster/Osnabrück, Norrköping, Paderborn/Lippstadt, Prague, Pristina, Salzburg, Sarajevo, Sharm El Sheikh, Skopje, Şymkent, Tbilisi, Vienna; Seasonal charter: Bydgoszcz, Gdańsk, Poznań
Red Wings Airlines	Seasonal: Chelyabinsk, Elista, Saransk
Rossiya	Sochi; Seasonal: Saint Petersburg
Royal Jordanian	Seasonal: Amman–City, Amman–Queen Alia
S7 Airlines	Moscow–Domodedovo, Novosibirsk
Saudia	Seasonal: Jeddah, Riyadh
Scandinavian Airlines	Seasonal: Copenhagen, Oslo, Stockholm–Arlanda
SCAT Airlines	Seasonal: Almaty, Astana
Smartwings	Prague; Seasonal charter: České Budějovice, Karlovy Vary
Smartwings Poland	Seasonal charter: Krakow, Lodz, Lublin, Olsztyn, Rzeszow, Szczecin, Wroclaw
Southwind Airlines	Seasonal: Arkhangelsk–Talagi, Astana, Beirut,, Berlin, El Alamein, Irkutsk, Kaliningrad, Krasnodar Kazan, Krasnoyarsk-International, London–Stansted, Moscow–Sheremetyevo, Moscow-Zhukovsky, Nizhny Novgorod, Orenburg, Perm, Saint Petersburg, Samara, Saratov, Sochi
SunExpress	Abu Dhabi, Adana/Mersin, Aleppo, Amman–Queen Alia, Basel/Mulhouse, Berlin, Birmingham, Bremen, Bristol, Budapest, Bursa, Cologne/Bonn, Copenhagen, Damascus, Diyarbakır, Dubai–International, Dublin, Düsseldorf, Edinburgh, Erzurum, Frankfurt, Gaziantep, Graz, Hamburg, Hannover, İzmir, Kayseri, Krakow, Leeds/Bradford, Leipzig/Halle, London–Gatwick, London–Stansted, Manchester, Munich, Münster/Osnabrück, Newcastle upon Tyne, Paris–Charles de Gaulle, Prague, Saarbrücken, Samsun, Sanliurfa, Sharm El Sheikh, Stockholm–Arlanda, Stuttgart, Trabzon, Van, Vienna, Weeze (begins 23 April 2027), Zürich; Seasonal: Billund, Brussels, Bucharest–Otopeni, Cairo, Dortmund, Dresden, Eindhoven, Erfurt-Weimar, Geneva, Helsinki, London–Luton, Memmingen, Milan–Malpensa, Ostrava, Paderborn/Lippstadt, Podgorica, Pristina, Riga, Sarajevo, Skopje, Tallinn, Tbilisi, Tirana, Vilnius, Warsaw–Chopin
Swiss International Air Lines	Seasonal: Geneva
Tailwind Airlines	Seasonal charter: Astrakhan, Grozny, Krasnodar, Saratov, Weeze
Transavia	Seasonal: Amsterdam, Lyon, Marseille, Nantes, Paris–Orly
TUI Airways	Seasonal: Birmingham, Bournemouth, Bristol, Cardiff, East Midlands, London–Gatwick, Manchester, Newcastle upon Tyne
TUI fly Belgium	Brussels; Seasonal: Antwerp, Ostend/Bruges
TUI fly Netherlands	Seasonal: Amsterdam, Eindhoven, Groningen, Rotterdam/The Hague
Turkish Airlines	Istanbul; Seasonal: Berlin, Frankfurt, Omsk, Stuttgart, Warsaw–Chopin; Seasonal charter: Moscow-Vnukovo, Saint Petersburg
Ural Airlines	Seasonal charter: Makahckala, Mineralnye Vody
Utair	Seasonal: Grozny, Surgut, Tyumen
Wizz Air	Seasonal: Bucharest–Otopeni, Cluj-Napoca, London–Gatwick, London–Luton

== Traffic statistics ==
Antalya International Airport passenger traffic statistics
Year (months)	Domestic	%change	International	%change	Total	%change
2026 (Oct.)	6,219,375	▲8%	28,618,230	▼6%	34,837,605	▼4%
2025	6,848,287	▲7%	32,151,890	▲1%	39,000,177	▲2%
2024	6,372,634	▲4%	31,760,639	▲8%	38,133,273	▲7%
2023	6,154,351	▲5%	29,509,787	▲17%	35,664,138	▲15%
2022	5,841,536	▲23%	25,266,645	▲46%	31,108,181	▲41%
2021	4,765,985	▲52%	17,247,876	▲162%	22,013,861	▲127%
2020	3,126,211	▼55%	6,584,984	▼77%	9,711,195	▼73%
2019	6,958,930	▼8%	28,720,491	▲19%	35,679,421	▲13%
2018	7,575,871	▲2%	24,127,993	▲31%	31,703,864	▲23%
2017	7,423,766	▲5%	18,448,685	▲57%	25,872,451	▲38%
2016	7,048,239	▲2%	11,720,296	▼44%	18,768,535	▼32%
2015	6,906,364	▲11%	20,863,040	▼5%	27,769,404	▼2%
2014	6,230,885	▲13%	22,072,307	▲3%	28,303,192	▲5%
2013	5,526,485	▲12%	21,492,138	▲7%	27,018,623	▲8%
2012	4,943,308	▲9%	20,152,836	▼2%	25,096,144	▲0%
2011	4,516,485	▲22%	20,511,172	▲12%	25,027,657	▲14%
2010	3,694,085	▲18%	18,318,942	▲20%	22,013,027	▲20%
2009	3,135,139	▲21%	15,210,554	▼6%	18,345,693	▼2%
2008	2,588,054	▲1%	16,201,203	▲7%	18,789,257	▲6%
2007	2,550,396	▲6%	15,159,989	▲24%	17,710,385	▲21%
2006	2,406,626	▲50%	12,235,417	▼14%	14,642,043	▼8%
2005	1,608,749	▲47%	14,256,114	▲13%	15,864,863	▲16%
2004	1,092,858	▲78%	12,563,195	▲29%	13,656,053	▲32%
2003	615,420	▲5%	9,756,180	▲0%	10,371,600	▲0%
2002	584,077	▲10%	9,750,874	▲13%	10,334,951	▲13%
2001	531,835	▼21%	8,638,634	▲27%	9,170,469	▲23%
2000	676,925	Steady	6,779,733	Steady	7,456,658	Steady

== Ground transport ==
There are 2 city buses that serve Antalya Airport (number 600 and 800). Route number 600 goes to/from Otogar (city bus station) and route number 800 goes to/from Lara. Also, Havaş shuttles serve the airport to/from 5M Migros shopping centre. The Antalya Tramway has been extended to the airport to provide a railway link to the city.

== See also ==
- List of the busiest airports in the Middle East
