= Chișinău International Airport =

Airport serving Chișinău, Moldova

Chișinău Eugen Doga International Airport Aeroportul Internațional „Eugen Doga” Chișinău
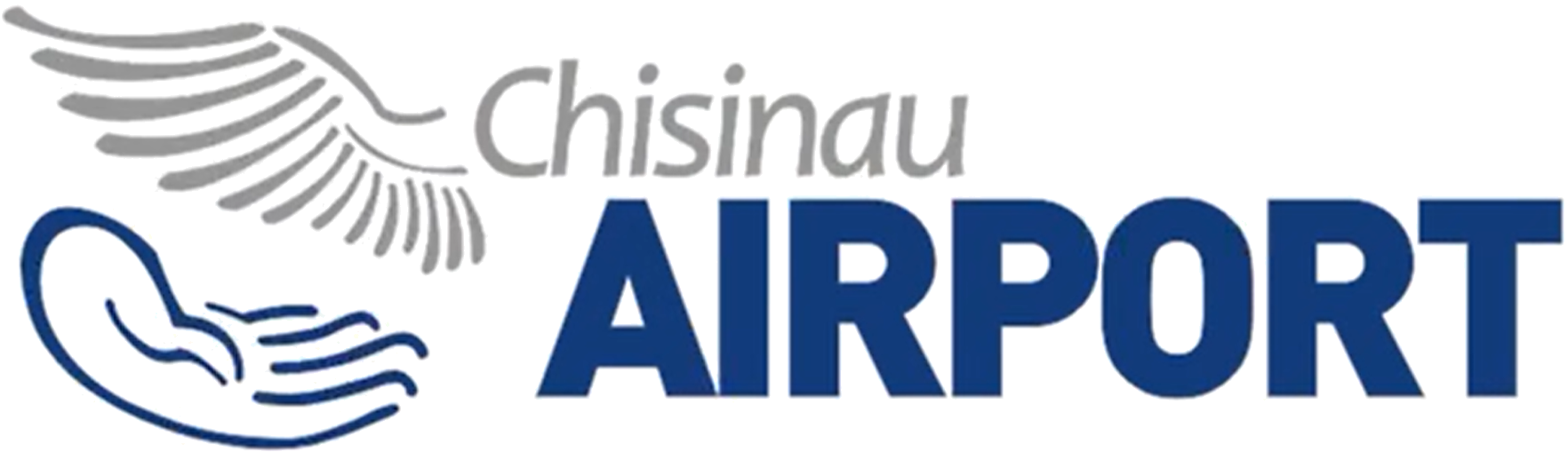

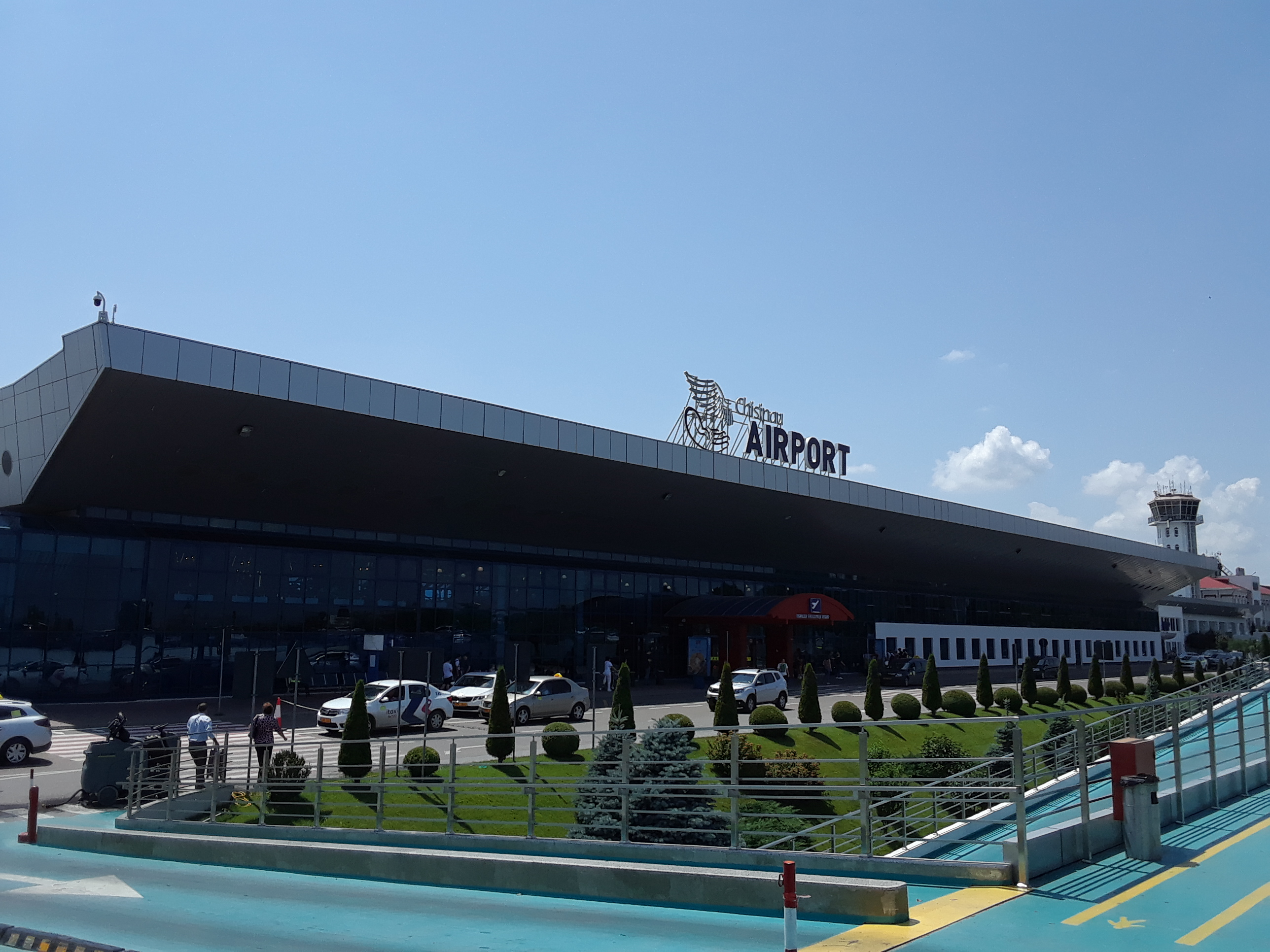
- The airport's main terminal in 2019
- IATA: RMO; ICAO: LUKK

Summary
- Airport type: Public
- Operator: Chișinău International Airport Company
- Serves: Chișinău
- Location: Chișinău, Moldova
- Opened: 1960; 66 years ago
- Hub for: FlyOne; HiSky; SkyUp Airlines; Wizz Air
- Built: 1974
- Elevation AMSL: 399 ft (122 m)
- Coordinates: 46°55′40″N 028°55′51″E
- Website: airport.md

Map
- Location in Moldova

Runways
Direction	Length		Surface
Direction	m	ft	Surface
08/26	3,590	11,778	Concrete
09/27	2,383	7,818	Concrete

Statistics (2025)
- Passengers: 6,080,431
- Aircraft movements: 45,449
- Sources: Moldovan AIP at Eurocontrol, statistics

Chișinău Eugen Doga International Airport (Romanian: Aeroportul Internațional „Eugen Doga” Chișinău; IATA: RMO, ICAO: LUKK) is Moldova's main international airport, located 13 kilometres (8 miles) southeast of the centre of Chișinău, the capital city. It is the 13th-busiest airport in post-Soviet states as well as 85th-busiest airport in Europe. It is the only airport in Moldova with regular passenger flights.

On 18 January 2024, the IATA airport code KIV, derived from Kishinev (the Russian and former English name of the city), was changed to RMO (Republica Moldova, "Republic of Moldova" in Romanian). Eugen Doga is the airport's namesake.

== History ==
=== Early years ===
The first scheduled flights to Chișinău started on 24 June 1926, on the route Bucharest–Galați–Chișinău and Iași. The flights were operated by CFRNA, later LARES. A commemorative plaque, describing the first flight to Chișinău, was placed in the airport.

The main terminal was built in the 1970s, with a capacity of 1,200,000 passengers per year.

=== Development since the 1990s ===
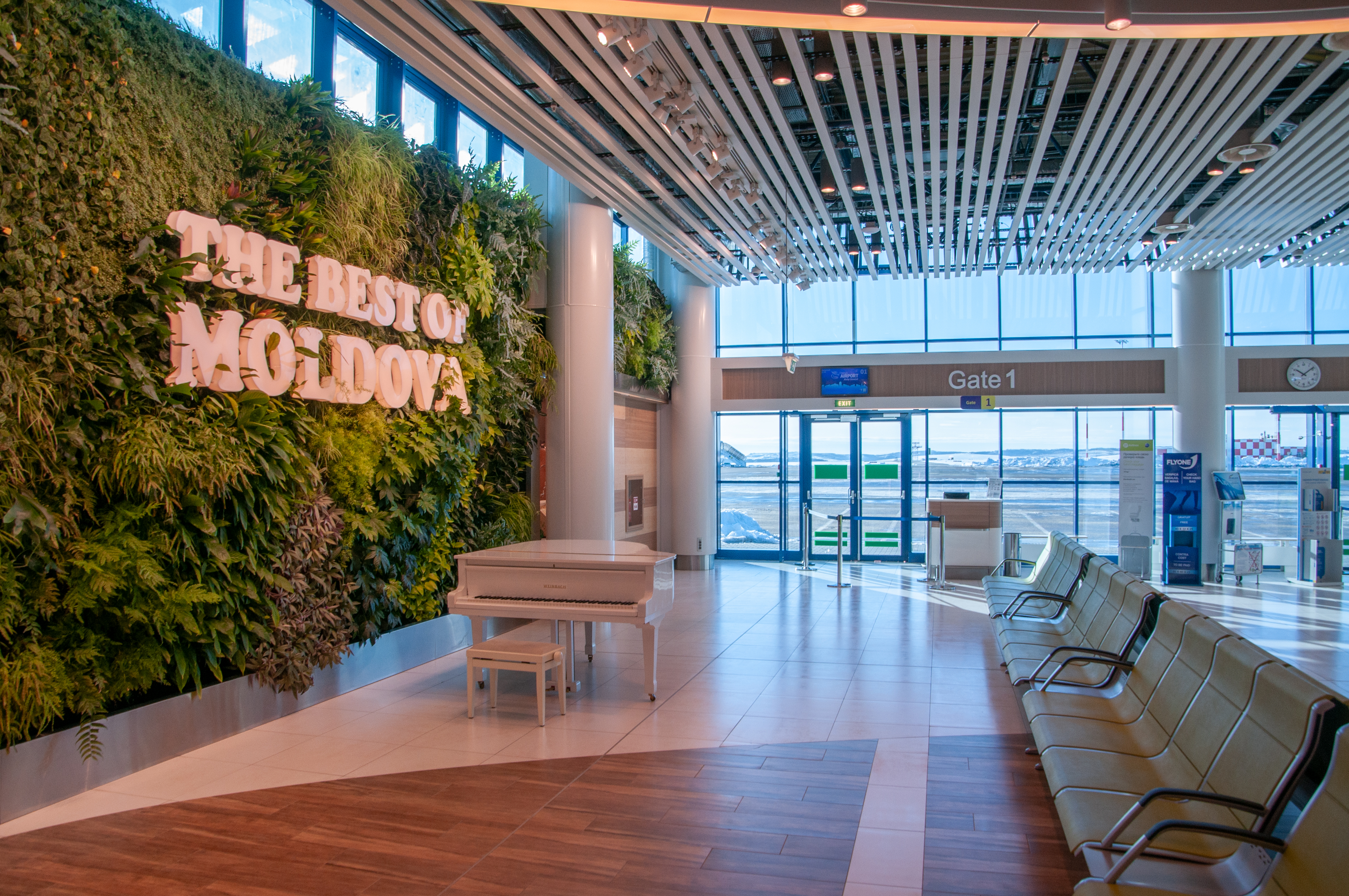
Interior of the airport after reconstruction

On 31 May 1995, Chișinău Airport was awarded the status of an international airport.

A major modernization and renovation of the airport was completed in 2002 by the Turkish company Akfen Holding. An annex terminal building with an area of 4,270 m^{2} (46,000 sq ft) was added to the renovated old terminal building of 7,600 m^{2} (82,000 sq ft). The project covered the construction of 3,000 m^{2} (32,000 sq ft) curtain walls, 3,200 m^{2} (34,000 sq ft) composite panels, 12,185 m^{2} (131,160 sq ft) asphalt road, a treatment plant with a capacity of 3,450 m^{3} (122,000 cu ft) a day, complete mechanical heating, ventilation and electrical systems, along with the X-ray security, luggage handling, master clock, and flight information systems. The annual capacity of the airport increased to 5.4 million passengers.

Chișinău International Airport is a member of Airports Council International.

The airport closed temporarily on 24 February 2022, as Moldovan airspace was closed in the wake of the Russian invasion of Ukraine. On 22 March 2022, the Civil Aviation Authority of Moldova partially reopened the country's airspace, which led to the resumption of operations at the airport.

On 14 March 2023, WizzAir suspended flights to/from Moldova due to concerns over airspace safety. After this, Igor Grosu, the president of the Moldovan Parliament, met with representatives of Ryanair to convince the company to operate flights at the airport, in order to replace Wizz Air as its main low-cost airline. On 17 October 2024, WizzAir announced their return to Moldova starting from 16 December 2024.

== Facilities ==
There were ten check-in desks and five gates at the airport in 2009. VIP and CIP guests are offered special services at the VIP terminal. A visitors' terrace on the second floor opened in December 2006.

Previously, passengers had to present their passport, ticket and their registration (of foreigners – which used to be required). Passengers were allowed in the check-in hall. With the introduction of e-tickets and the abolition of the registration for foreigners, the airport reorganised in late 2006. This resulted in a bigger check-in hall, and customs control is now after check-in.

There are plans to enlarge the airport. The project involves a €19 million loan to Chișinău International Airport for the rehabilitation and upgrade of the existing runway, taxiways, aprons, and ramps, engineering works, safety equipment and other connected core assets of Chișinău International Airport. The European Investment Bank (EIB) is considering co-financing alongside the EBRD for up to an equal amount. Towards the end of 2017, plans for a second runway were unveiled. This runway would take the place of the current taxiway just north of the existing runway. The project began in early 2017. Runway 09–27 started operations on 13 September 2018.

The Civil Aviation Authority has its headquarters on the airport property.

In 2019, Moldovan sculptor Veaceslav Jiglitski installed the sculpture group "Crew" in the passenger check-in hall. At the entrance to the airport there is a monument using a decommissioned Tu-134 aircraft.

== Airlines and destinations ==
The following airlines offer regular scheduled and charter flights at Chișinău International Airport:

Airlines	Destinations
Aegean Airlines	Athens
Air Anka	Seasonal charter: Antalya
airBaltic	Riga, Vilnius
Air Serbia	Belgrade (begins 3 June 2027)
AJet	Istanbul–Sabiha Gökçen
Austrian Airlines	Vienna
Azerbaijan Airlines	Baku
Eurowings	Cologne/Bonn, Stuttgart
flydubai	Dubai–International
FlyOne	Alicante, Amsterdam, Berlin, Bologna, Bremen, Brussels, Copenhagen, Dresden (begins 17 December 2026), Dubai–International, Dublin, Düsseldorf, Hahn, Geneva, Istanbul, Lisbon, London–Luton, Lyon, Málaga, Milan–Malpensa, Munich, Naples, Parma, Prague, Rome–Fiumicino, Stuttgart, Tashkent, Tbilisi, Tel Aviv, Turin, Verona, Yerevan; Seasonal: Barcelona, Dubai–Al Maktoum, Heraklion, Larnaca, Madrid, Nice, Palma de Mallorca, Tivat, Valencia; Seasonal charter: Antalya, Bodrum, Izmir, Sharm El Sheikh
Freebird Airlines	Antalya
HiSky	Beauvais, Bergamo, Bologna, Bucharest–Otopeni, Dublin, Düsseldorf, Frankfurt, Hamburg, Istanbul, London–Stansted, Rome–Fiumicino, Tel Aviv, Venice; Seasonal charter: Hurghada
Israir	Tel Aviv
LOT Polish Airlines	Warsaw–Chopin
Lufthansa	Frankfurt
Mavi Gök Airlines	Seasonal charter: Antalya
Pegasus Airlines	Antalya, Istanbul–Sabiha Gökçen
Polaris Aviation	Berlin (begins 12 December 2026), Bologna (begins 18 November 2026), Dublin (begins 21 November 2026), Düsseldorf (begins 10 December 2026), Frankfurt (begins 11 December 2026), Istanbul, Milan–Malpensa (begins 19 November 2026), Paris–Charles de Gaulle (begins 11 November 2026), Prague (begins 18 November 2026), Rome–Fiumicino (begins 20 November 2026), Verona (begins 18 November 2026)
SkyUp Airlines	Alicante, Athens, Barcelona, Berlin, Dublin, Larnaca, London–Stansted (begins 26 March 2027), Madrid, Stockholm–Skavsta, Tbilisi, Tel Aviv, Thessaloniki; Seasonal: Corfu, Heraklion, Nice, Palma de Mallorca, Pula (begins 13 June 2027), Split (begins 5 June 2027), Tirana, Zakynthos
Sundor	Tel Aviv
SunExpress	Antalya; Seasonal: İzmir (begins 12 May 2027)
Tailwind Airlines	Seasonal charter: Antalya
TAROM	Bucharest–Otopeni
Transavia	Seasonal: Paris–Orly
Turkish Airlines	Istanbul; Seasonal charter: Antalya
Wizz Air	Athens, Barcelona, Beauvais, Bergamo, Berlin, Bologna, Bratislava, Brașov (begins 17 December 2026), Bucharest–Otopeni, Budapest, Charleroi, Cologne/Bonn, Copenhagen, Dortmund, Hamburg, Katowice, Larnaca, London–Gatwick, London–Luton, Memmingen, Milan–Malpensa, Naples, Nice, Nuremberg, Prague, Rome–Fiumicino, Sofia, Venice, Verona, Warsaw–Modlin, Wrocław

== Statistics ==
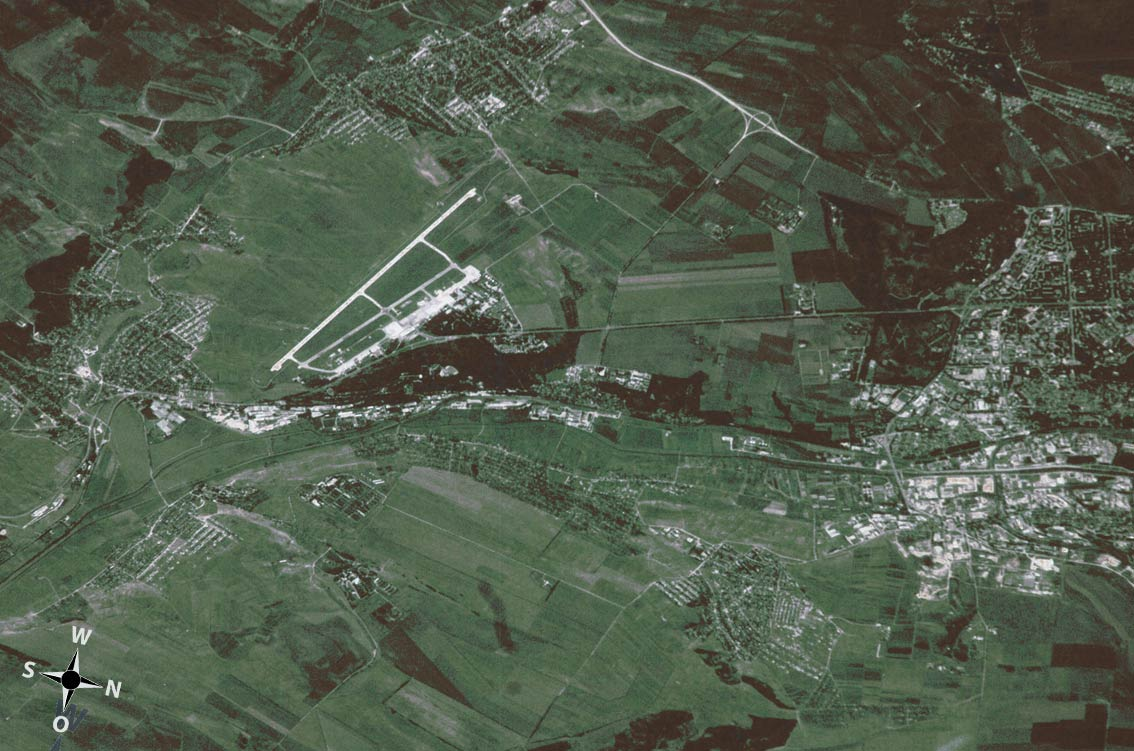
Satellite Chisinau 2002

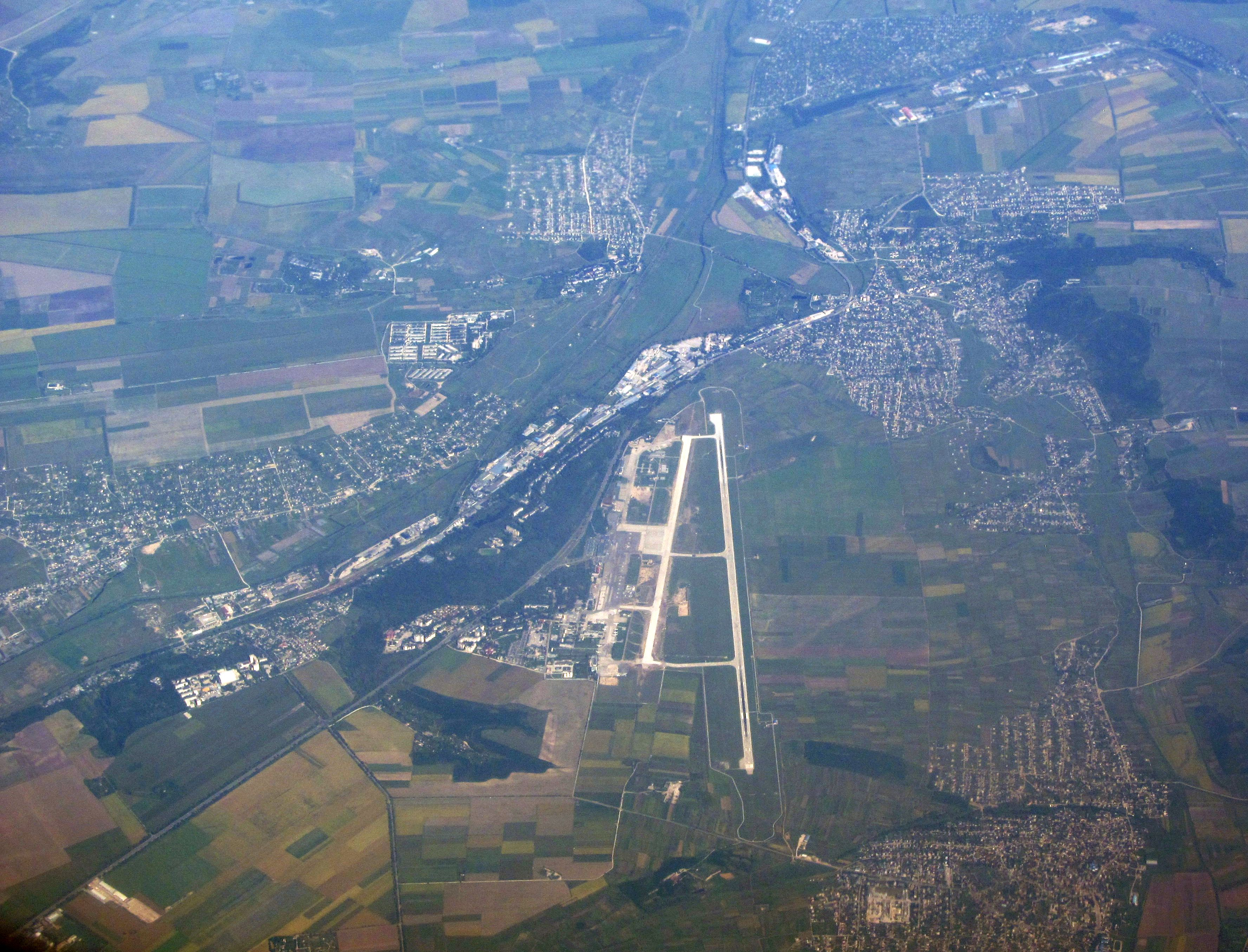
Aerial view of the airport

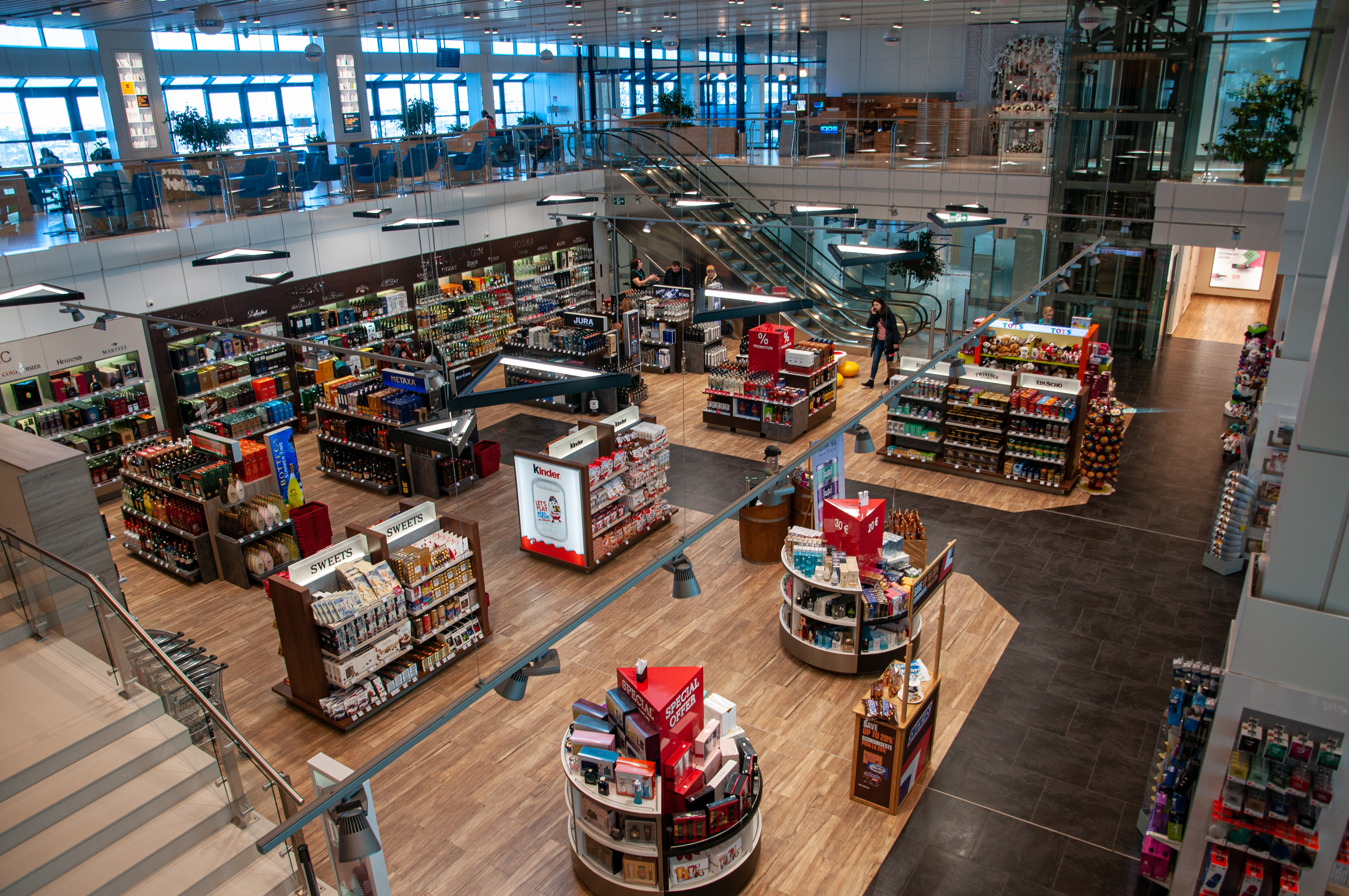
Central commercial area

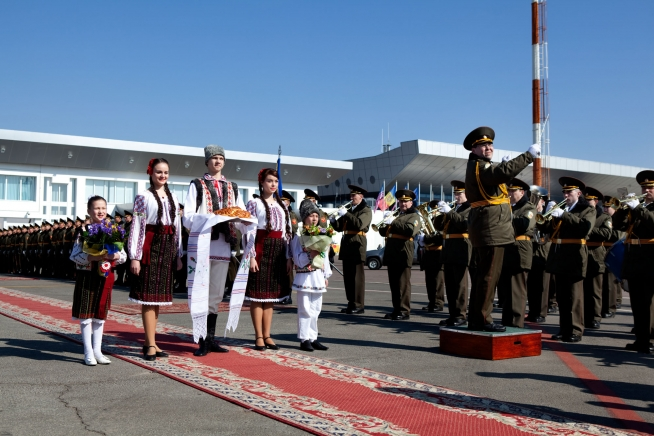
The Presidential Band of the Republic of Moldova at the airport during Joe Biden's visit to Moldova.

In 2022, Chișinău Airport handled around 2.31 million passengers, an increase of over 25% compared to 2021 (1.84 million passengers).

Year	Passengers (total)	Change	Aircraft movements (total)	Change	Cargo (tonnes)	Change
2000	254,178	N/A	9,521	N/A	2,400	
2001	274,662	▲8.0%	9,866	▲3.6%	1,700	
2002	296,431	▲7.9%	10,416	▲5.5%	1,300	
2003	341,695	▲15.2%	9,502	▼8.7%	1,300	
2004	421,011	▲23.2%	10,759	▲13.2%	1,400	
2005	482,741	▲14.6%	11,126	▲3.4%	1,700	
2006	548,331	▲13.5%	10,065	▼9.5%	1,800	
2007	688,782	▲25.6%	11,623	▲15.4%	2,300	
2008	847,881	▲23.1%	12,935	▲11.3%	2,468.8	
2009	808,096	▼4.7%	12,355	▼4.5%	2,033.2	▼17.6%
2010	937,030	▲15.9%	13,751	▲11.3%	2,399.2	▲18.0%
2011	1,046,086	▲11.6%	15,022	▲9.2%	2,666.2	▲11.1%
2012	1,220,506	▲16.7%	16,113	▲7.3%	2,765.4	▲3.7%
2013	1,321,236	▲8.2%	16,858	▲4.6%	2,951.8	▲6.7%
2014	1,781,166	▲34.8%	19,756	▲17.2%	2,923.5	▼0.9%
2015	2,226,441	▲25.0%	22,468	▲13.7%	2,891.8	▼1.1%
2016	2,206,266	▼0.9%	22,033	▼1.9%	2,774.3	▼4.1%
2017	2,744,465	▲24.4%	27,113	▲23.1%	3,488.7	▲25.7%
2018	2,828,626	▲3.1%	27,949	▲3.1%	4,186.6	▲20.0%
2019	2,995,530	▲5.9%	27,092	▼3.1%	3,767.7	▼10.0%
2020	900,731	▼69.9%	9,870	▼63.6%		
2021	1,822,505	▲102.3%	16,590	▲68.1%		
2022	2,254,199	▲23.7%	19,199	▲15.7%		
2023	2,838,073	▲25.9%	24,947	▲29.9%	2,652.6	
2024	4,142,418	▲46.0%	33,251	▲33.3%	3,390.3	▲27.8%
2025	6,080,431	▲46.8%	45,452	▲36.7%	3,500	▲3.2%

=== Routes ===
Busiest international routes at Chișinău Airport by weekly flights
Rank	City	Airport(s)	Weekly Departures (16 June 2024)	Airlines
1.	Istanbul	Istanbul Airport	35	Turkish Airlines; FlyOne
2.	Bucharest	Henri Coandă International Airport	26	TAROM; HiSky
3.	Antalya	Antalya Airport	22	Pegasus Airlines; FlyOne; Turkish Airlines; Southwind Airlines
4.	Tel Aviv	Ben Gurion Airport	17	FlyOne; HiSky
5.	London	London Luton Airport	14	FlyOne; Wizz Air
6.	Yerevan	Zvartnots International Airport	14	FlyOne; FlyOne Armenia
7.	Warsaw	Warsaw Chopin Airport	13	LOT Polish Airlines
8.	Vienna	Vienna Airport	13	Austrian Airlines
9.	Dublin	Dublin Airport	11	FlyOne; HiSky
10.	Heraklion	Heraklion International Airport	9	FlyOne

== Ground transportation ==
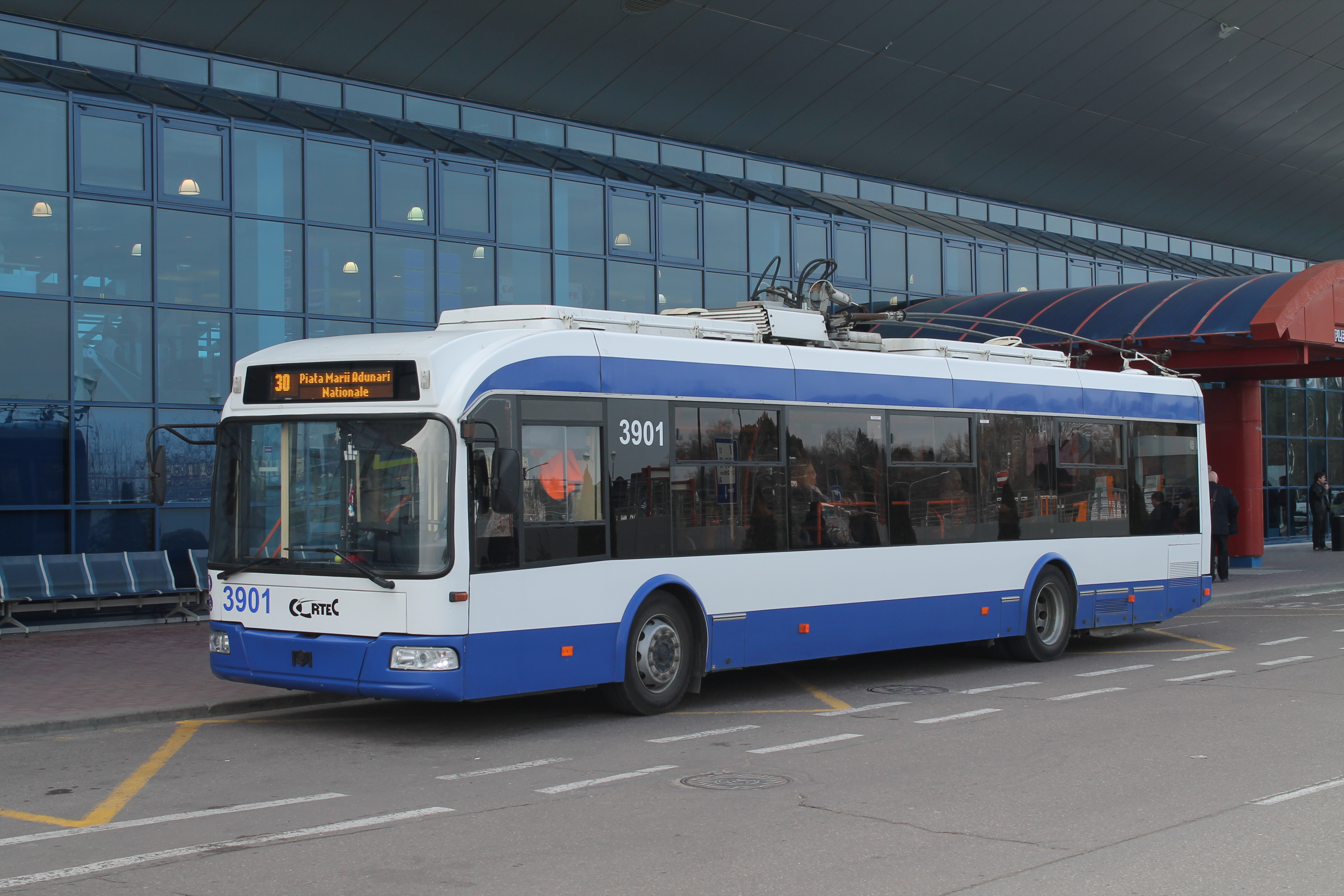
Trolleybus number 30 in front of the terminal

There are bus and trolleybus lines frequently departing from the airport.

== Incidents and accidents ==
- At 11:49 on 15 May 1970, CCCP-11149, an Antonov An-10A of Aeroflot's Ulyanovsk Advanced Flying Training College, crashed during a go-around when both engines shut down. All 11 onboard were killed.
- On 11 April 2008, Kata Air Transport Flight 007, a Sudanese cargo An-32 "Cline" flying from Vienna to Khartoum via Antalya crashed on approach to the airport, killing all eight on board. The plane was returning to the airport, where it had just been repaired, due to engine problems.
- On 30 June 2023, 43-year-old Tajikistani national, Rustam Ashurov, who was wanted for criminal charges in his home country and had been refused entry to Moldova from Turkey, snatched a gun from a border police officer and opened fire, killing a border guard and an airport security official, and injuring another person. The gunman was wounded and arrested. He died in a hospital three days later.

== See also ==
- Civil Aviation Administration of Moldova
- List of airports in Moldova
- List of the busiest airports in Europe
- List of the busiest airports in the former USSR
