= List of airlines of Turkey =

This is a list of national airlines currently operating in Turkey.

== Scheduled airlines ==
Airline	Airline (in Turkish)	Image	ICAO	IATA	Callsign	Commenced operations
Air Anka			TAH	6K	AIR ANKA	2021
AJet	AJet Transport		TKJ	VF	ANATOLIA	2008
Corendon Airlines	Corendon Airlines	Corendon Airlines Boeing 737 MAX 8	CAI	XC	CORENDON	2005
Pegasus Airlines	Pegasus Air Transport		PGT	PC	SUNTURK	1990
Southwind Airlines	Southwind Airlines		STW	2S	MOON STAR	2022
SunExpress	Güneş Express Aviation	SunExpress Boeing 737 MAX 8	SXS	XQ	SUNEXPRESS	1990
Turkish Airlines	Türk Hava Yolları		THY	TK	TURKISH	1933

== Charter airlines ==
Airline	Airline (in Turkish)	Image	ICAO	IATA	Callsign	Commenced operations
Freebird Airlines	Hürkuş Air Transport and Trade		FHY	FH	FREEBIRD AIR	2001
Tailwind Airlines	Tailwind Airlines		TWI	TI	TAILWIND	2009

== Cargo airlines ==
Airline	Airline (in Turkish)	Image	ICAO	IATA	Callsign	Commenced Operations
Air ACT	ACT Airlines		RUN	9T	CARGO TURK	2004 (2011)^{1}
MNG Airlines	MNG Airlines		MNB	MB	BLACK SEA	1997
Turkish Cargo	Türk Hava Yolları		THY	TK	TURKISH	1933
ULS Airlines Cargo	ULS Airlines Cargo		KZU	GO	UNIVERSAL CARGO	2004

== See also ==
- List of airlines
- List of defunct airlines of Turkey
- List of airports in Turkey
