= Freebird Airlines =

Charter airline of Turkey

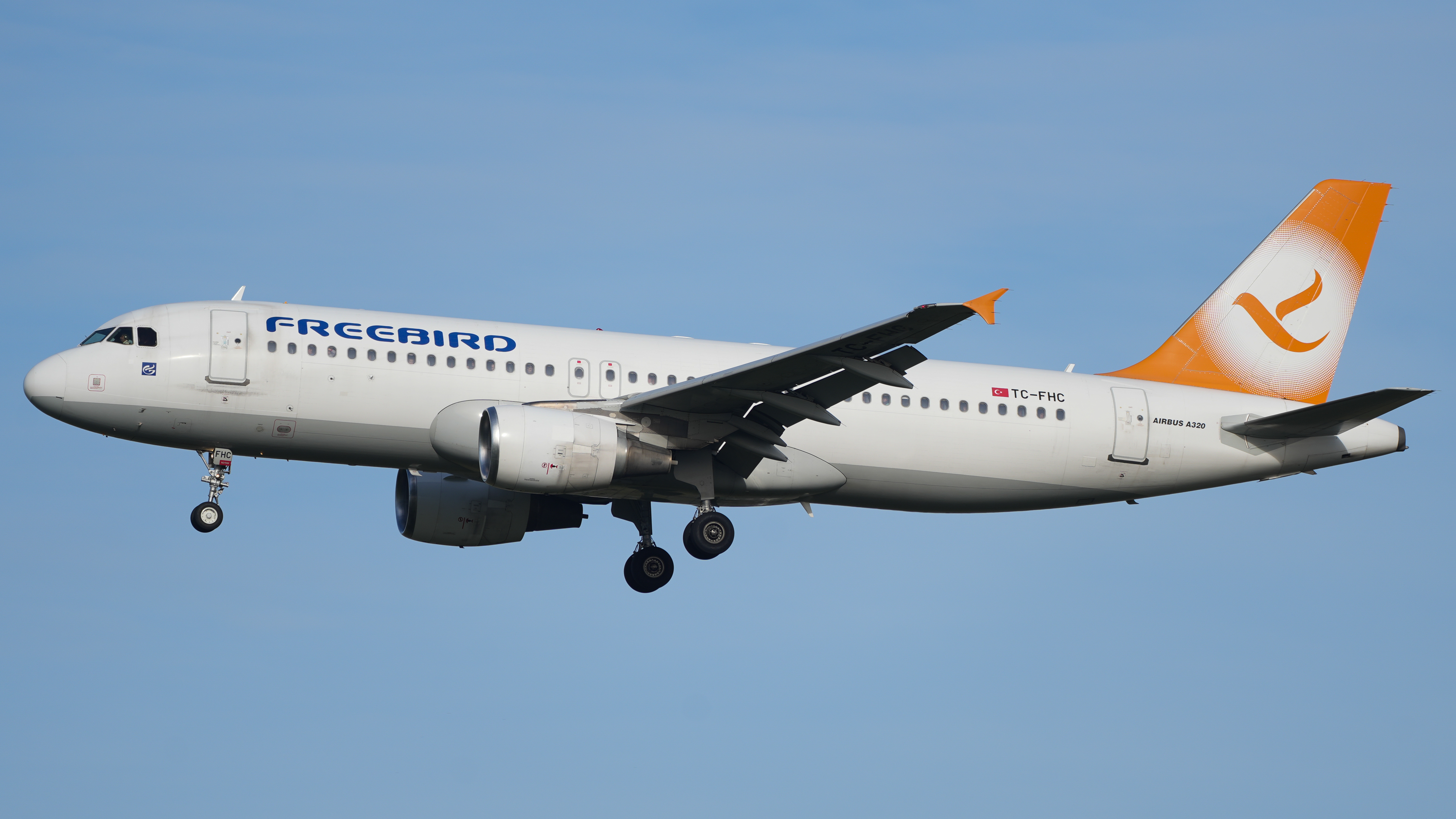
IATA	ICAO	Call sign
FH	FHY	FREEBIRD AIR
- Founded: 2000; 26 years ago
- Hubs: Antalya Airport, Bodrum Airport, Dalaman Airport
- Focus cities: Berlin, Cologne, Dusseldorf
- Subsidiaries: Freebird Airlines Europe
- Fleet size: 14
- Destinations: 100
- Parent company: Gözen Holding
- Headquarters: Istanbul, Turkey
- Website: www.freebirdairlines.com

Freebird Airlines (legally Hürkuş Hava Yolu Taşımacılık ve Ticaret A.Ş.), a subsidiary of Gözen Holding, is an international airline registered in Turkey and Malta. Primarily focusing on European countries, it operates scheduled and charter flights to various holiday destinations. Its main base is Antalya Airport.

== History ==
Freebird Airlines was established in 2000 and commenced its first commercial flight on 5 April 2001. Initially operating with a fleet of three McDonnell Douglas MD-83 aircraft, the airline has expanded its operations and, as of 2025, flies to over 100 airports with a fleet of 14 Airbus A320 aircraft.

The airline operates a fleet of 14 Airbus A320 aircraft, certified under both Turkish and Maltese aviation authorities. These aircraft are configured for 180 passengers and primarily serve leisure destinations across Europe.

In addition to its main operations, Freebird Airlines has a European subsidiary, Freebird Airlines Europe, which was established in Malta in 2019 under a separate Air Operator Certificate (AOC). This subsidiary operates three Airbus A320 aircraft and focuses on flights within the European Union.

Freebird Airlines was the first Turkish airline to receive ISO 9001:2000 certification in 2002 and later became the first Turkish charter airline to obtain IOSA (IATA Operational Safety Audit) registration in 2006. Over the years, the airline has made several strategic advancements, including transitioning its fleet from McDonnell Douglas MD-83 aircraft to Airbus A320s, relocating its main base to Antalya in 2013, and launching scheduled flight services in January 2022.

== Freebird Airlines Europe ==
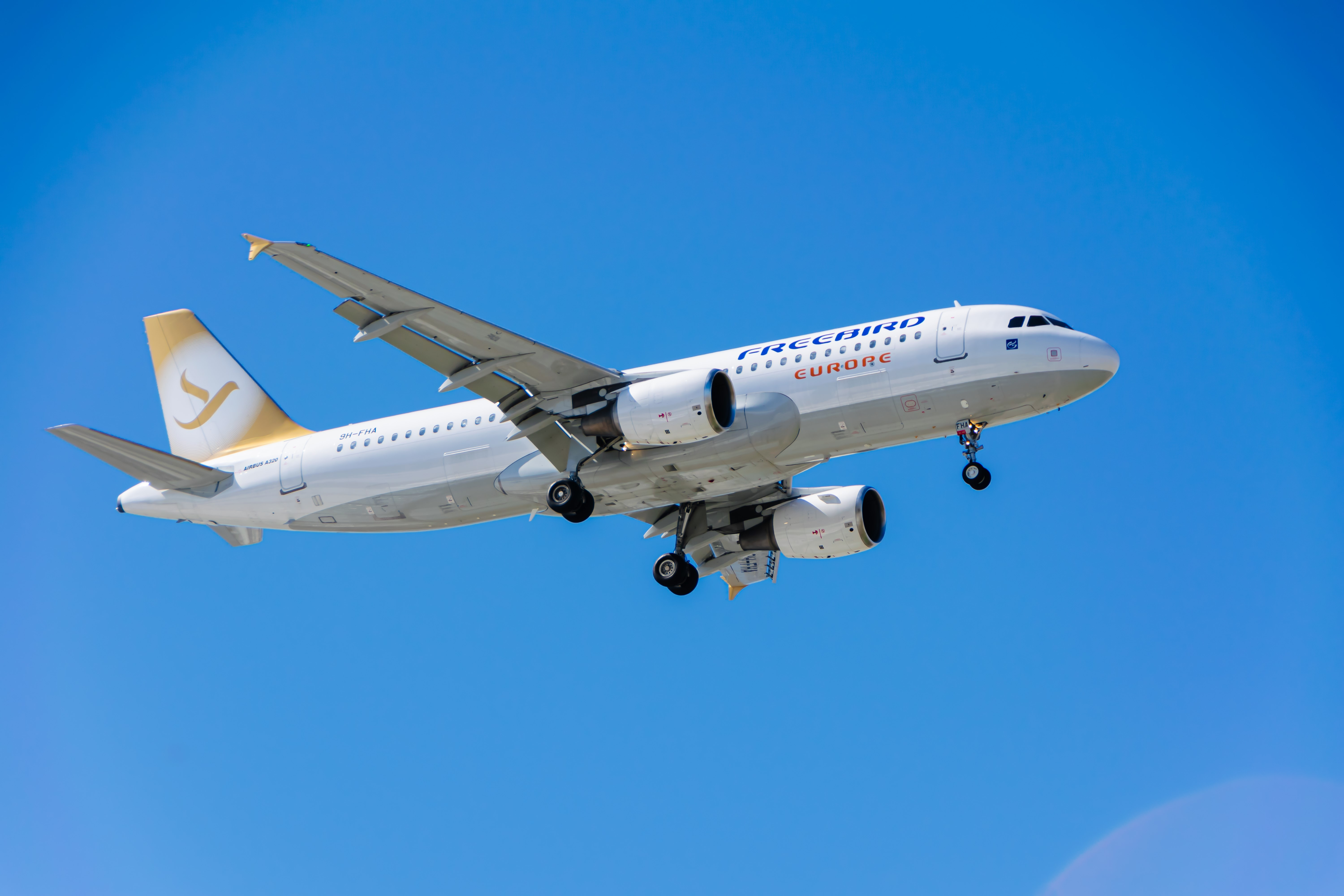
9H-FHA Airbus A320

Freebird Airlines Europe (IATA: MI, ICAO: FHM, callsign: EUROBIRD) is a Malta-based charter airline and a subsidiary of Freebird Airlines. The airline operates charter flights across popular leisure destinations within Europe and serves as the European extension of its parent company.

Freebird Airlines Europe was established in 2018 in Malta by Freebird Airlines and commenced operations on 20 February 2019 after receiving its European Union Aviation Safety Agency (EASA) Air Operator Certificate (AOC) from the Malta Civil Aviation Directorate (TM-CAD).

The airline operates a fleet of Malta-registered Airbus A320 aircraft and focuses on connecting major European holiday destinations. Freebird Airlines Europe complements the operations of its parent company by expanding Freebird’s presence within the EU aviation market.

== Fleet ==
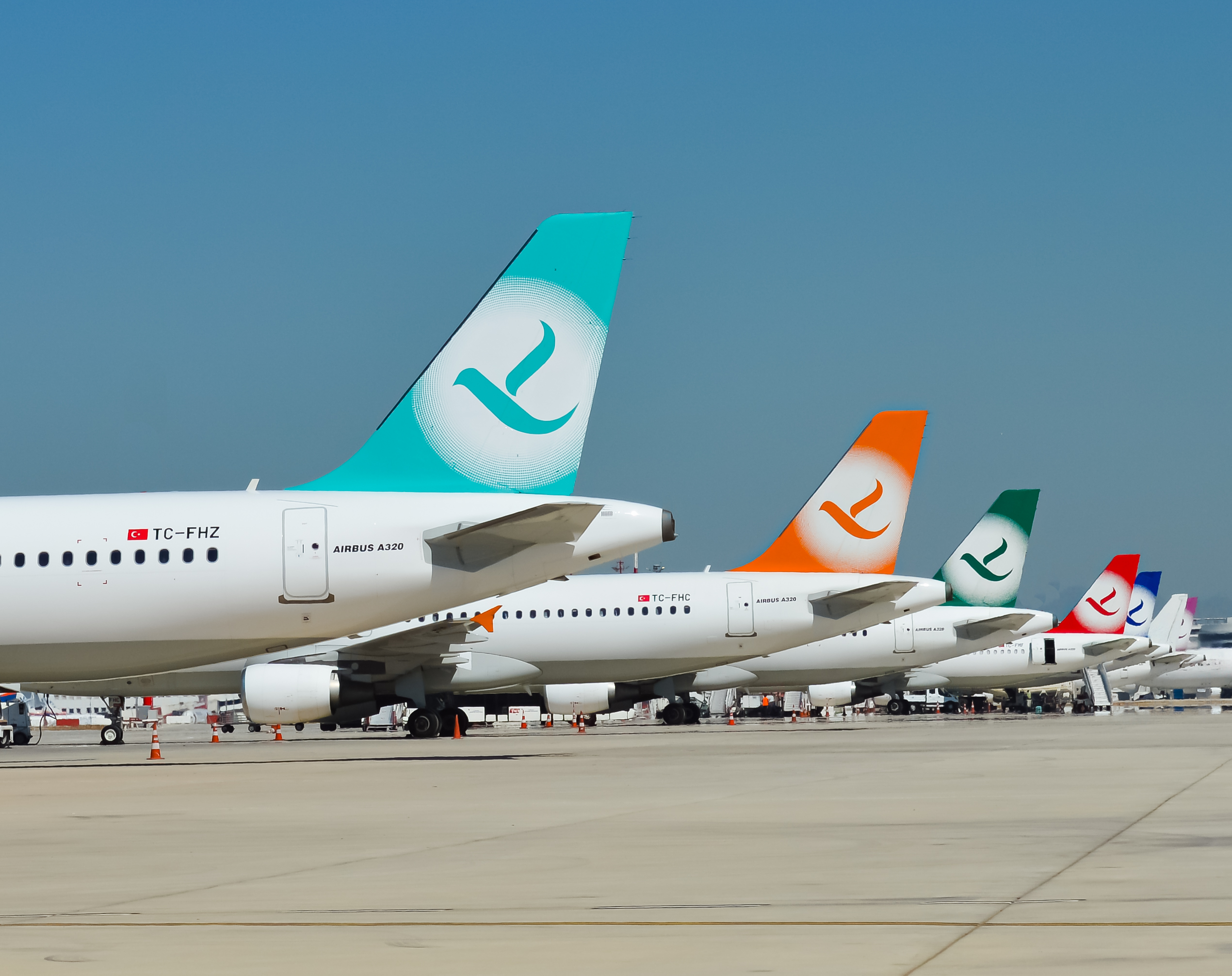
Each Airbus A320 aircraft features a different tail color variation.

Freebird Airlines operates a fleet of 11 Airbus A320-200 aircraft, while Freebird Airlines Europe operates a fleet of 3 Airbus A320-200 aircraft.

== Livery ==
Freebird Airlines aircraft feature a distinctive livery concept in which each aircraft tail is painted in a different solid color. Rather than using a single standardized tail design across the fleet, the airline applies a variety of colors.

== Flight network ==
Freebird Airlines primarily serves leisure destinations across Europe, operating both seasonal charter flights and regular scheduled services. The airline’s scheduled network includes major German airports such as Berlin, Cologne/Bonn, Düsseldorf, Frankfurt, Hamburg, and Munich, while its charter operations extend to Spain, Belgium, the United Kingdom, Estonia, Denmark, Greece, the Czech Republic, and additional destinations.

The airline’s main operational bases are Antalya Airport, Dalaman Airport, and Bodrum Airport, which function as hubs for both charter and scheduled flights.

== Destinations ==
As of July 2026, Freebird Airlines operates to numerous popular destinations across Europe and beyond:

Freebird Airlines flight network
Country	City	Airport	Notes	Refs
Antalya	Antalya	Antalya Airport	Scheduled	
Greece	Heraklion	Heraklion International Airport	Scheduled	
Greece	Kos	Kos Island International Airport	Scheduled	
Greece	Rhodes	Rhodes International Airport	Scheduled	
Germany	Berlin	Berlin Brandenburg Airport	Scheduled	
Germany	Cologne/Bonn	Cologne Bonn Airport	Scheduled	
Germany	Düsseldorf	Düsseldorf Airport	Scheduled	
Germany	Erfurt	Erfurt–Weimar Airport	Scheduled	
Germany	Frankfurt	Frankfurt Airport	Scheduled	
Germany	Friedrichshafen	Friedrichshafen Airport	Scheduled	
Germany	Hamburg	Hamburg Airport	Scheduled	
Germany	Hanover	Hannover Airport	Scheduled	
Germany	Karlsruhe/Baden-Baden	Karlsruhe/Baden-Baden Airport	Scheduled	
Germany	Munich	Munich Airport	Scheduled	
Germany	Nuremberg	Nuremberg Airport	Scheduled	
Germany	Paderborn/Lippstadt	Paderborn Lippstadt Airport	Scheduled	
Germany	Stuttgart	Stuttgart Airport	Scheduled	
Moldova	Chișinău	Chișinău International Airport	Scheduled	
Belgium	Brussels	Brussels Airport	Charter	
Spain	Fuerteventura	Fuerteventura Airport	Charter	
Poland	Warsaw	Warsaw Chopin Airport	Charter	
United Kingdom	Bournemouth	Bournemouth Airport	Charter	
United Kingdom	Newcastle upon Tyne	Newcastle International Airport	Charter	
Estonia	Tallinn	Tallinn Airport	Charter	
Slovakia	Bratislava	M. R. Štefánik Airport	Charter	
Czech Republic	Prague	Václav Havel Airport Prague	Charter	
Denmark	Copenhagen	Copenhagen Airport	Charter	
Belgium	Ostend	Ostend–Bruges International Airport	Charter	

== See also ==
- List of airlines of Turkey
- List of charter airlines
