= Freebird Airlines Europe =

Maltese charter airline

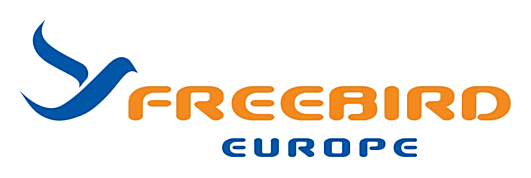
IATA	ICAO	Call sign
MI	FHM	EUROBIRD
- Founded: 2018; 8 years ago
- Operating bases: Cologne-Bonn Airport; Leipzig-Halle Airport; Paderborn Lippstadt Airport
- Fleet size: 3
- Parent company: Gözen Holding
- Website: freebirdairlines.com

Freebird Airlines Europe is a charter airline based in Malta. It is a subsidiary of the Turkish Freebird Airlines.

== History ==
The airline was established in August 2018 after Freebird Airlines set up a new Air operator's certificate for a new subsidiary. They received their first aircraft on 29 January 2019, starting operations on 20 February.

== Fleet ==
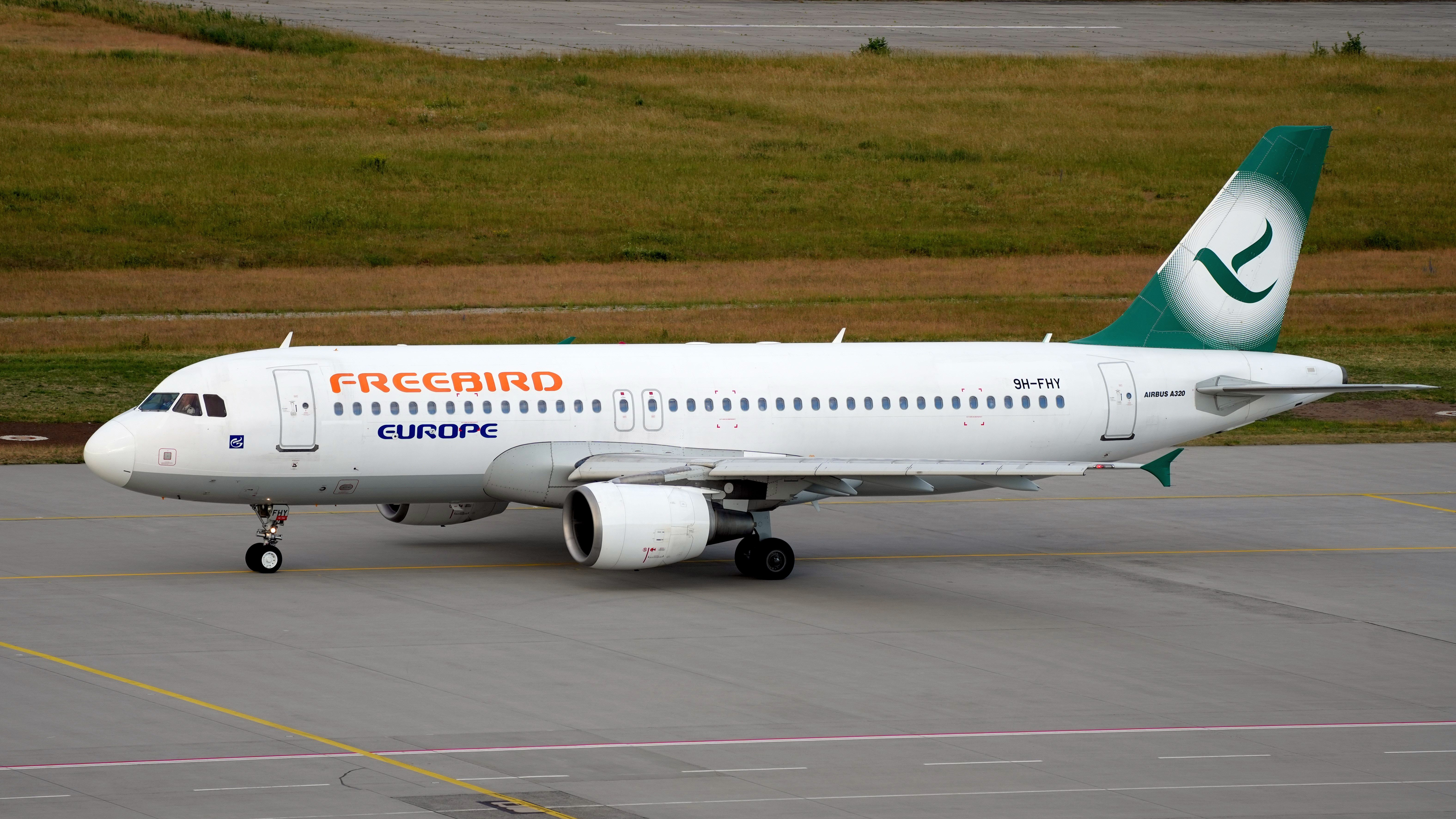
Freebird Airlines Europe Airbus A320-214

As of July 2026, Freebird Airlines Europe operates the following aircraft:

Aircraft	In service	Orders	Passengers
Airbus A320-200	3	—	180
Total	3	—	

=== Former fleet ===
As of August 2025, Freebird Airlines Europe operated 3 Airbus A320.
