= Hamburg Airport =

Airport in Hamburg, Germany

Hamburg Airport Flughafen Hamburg „Helmut Schmidt”

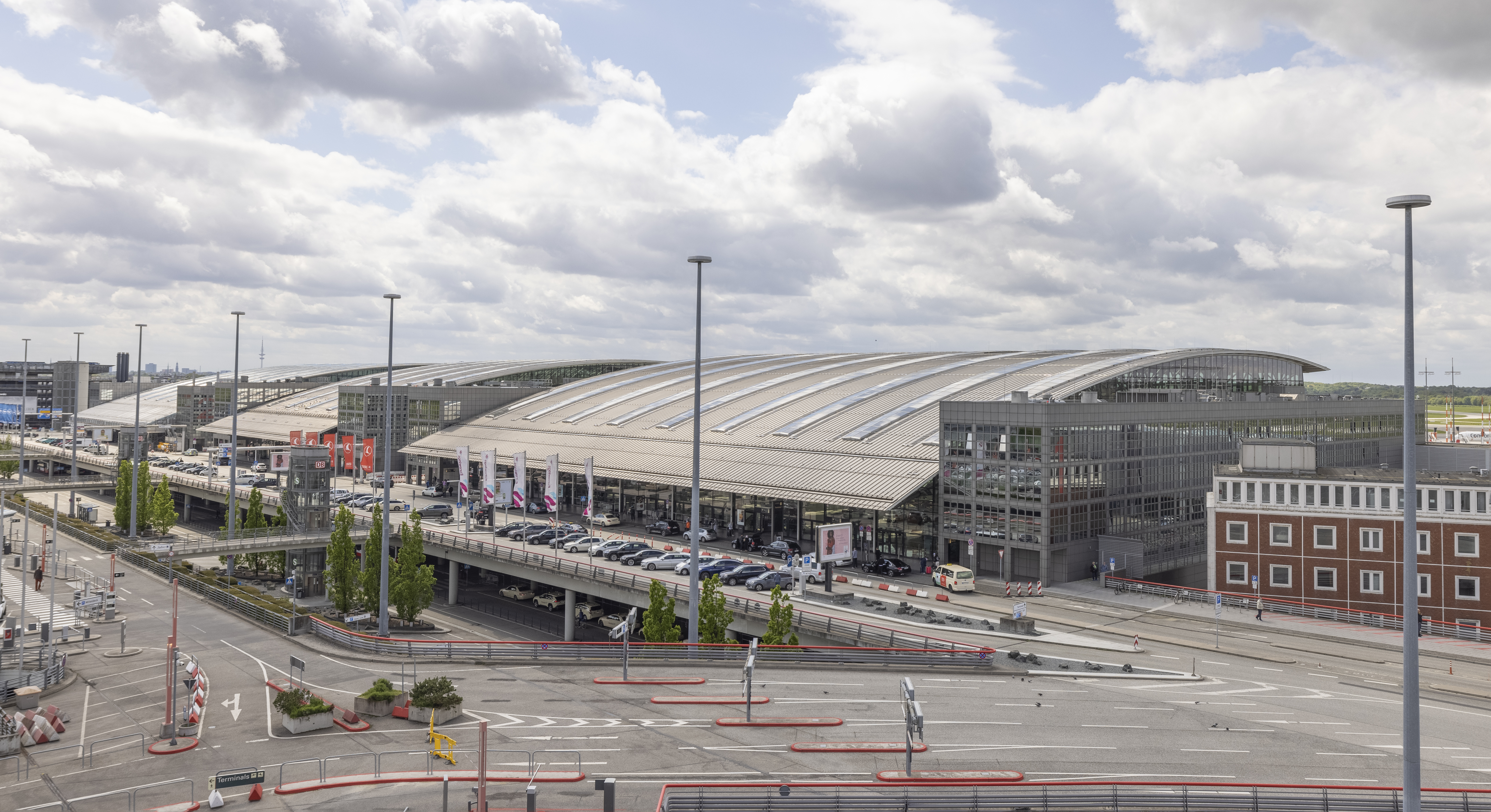
- IATA: HAM; ICAO: EDDH

Summary
- Airport type: Public
- Owner: Ministry of Economic Affairs, Transportation and Innovation (City of Hamburg) (51%); AviAlliance (49%)
- Operator: Flughafen Hamburg GmbH
- Serves: Hamburg Metropolitan Region
- Location: Fuhlsbüttel, Hamburg, Germany
- Opened: 10 January 1911; 115 years ago
- Operating base for: Condor; Eurowings; Marabu
- Elevation AMSL: 16 m (52 ft)
- Coordinates: 53°37′49″N 009°59′28″E
- Website: hamburg-airport.de

Map
- Location of Hamburg Airport HAM/EDDH (Germany)

Runways
Direction	Length		Surface
Direction	m	ft	Surface
05/23	3,250	10,663	Asphalt
15/33	3,666	12,028	Asphalt

Statistics (2025)
- Passengers: 14,770,812 ▼ -0.4%
- Aircraft movements: 126,719 ▼ -0.2%
- Cargo (metric tons): 31,418 ▲ +4.5%
- Source: Statistics at ADV., AIP at German air traffic control.

Hamburg Airport (IATA: HAM, ICAO: EDDH) is a major international airport in Hamburg, the second-largest city in Germany. Since November 2016 the airport has been named after the former German chancellor Helmut Schmidt. It is located 8.5 km (5.3 mi) north of the city centre in the Fuhlsbüttel quarter and serves as a hub for Eurowings and focus city for Condor. It was formerly named Hamburg-Fuhlsbüttel Airport, a name still frequently used.

Hamburg Airport is the fifth-busiest of Germany's commercial airports measured by the number of passengers and counted 13,559,732 passengers and 120,315 aircraft movements in 2023. As of July 2017, it featured flights to more than 130 mostly European metropolitan and leisure destinations as well as two long-haul routes to Dubai and Doha. The airport is equipped to handle wide-bodied aircraft including the Airbus A380.

Hamburg's other airport, Hamburg Finkenwerder Airport where the Airbus factory is located, is not open to commercial traffic.

== History ==
=== Early years ===
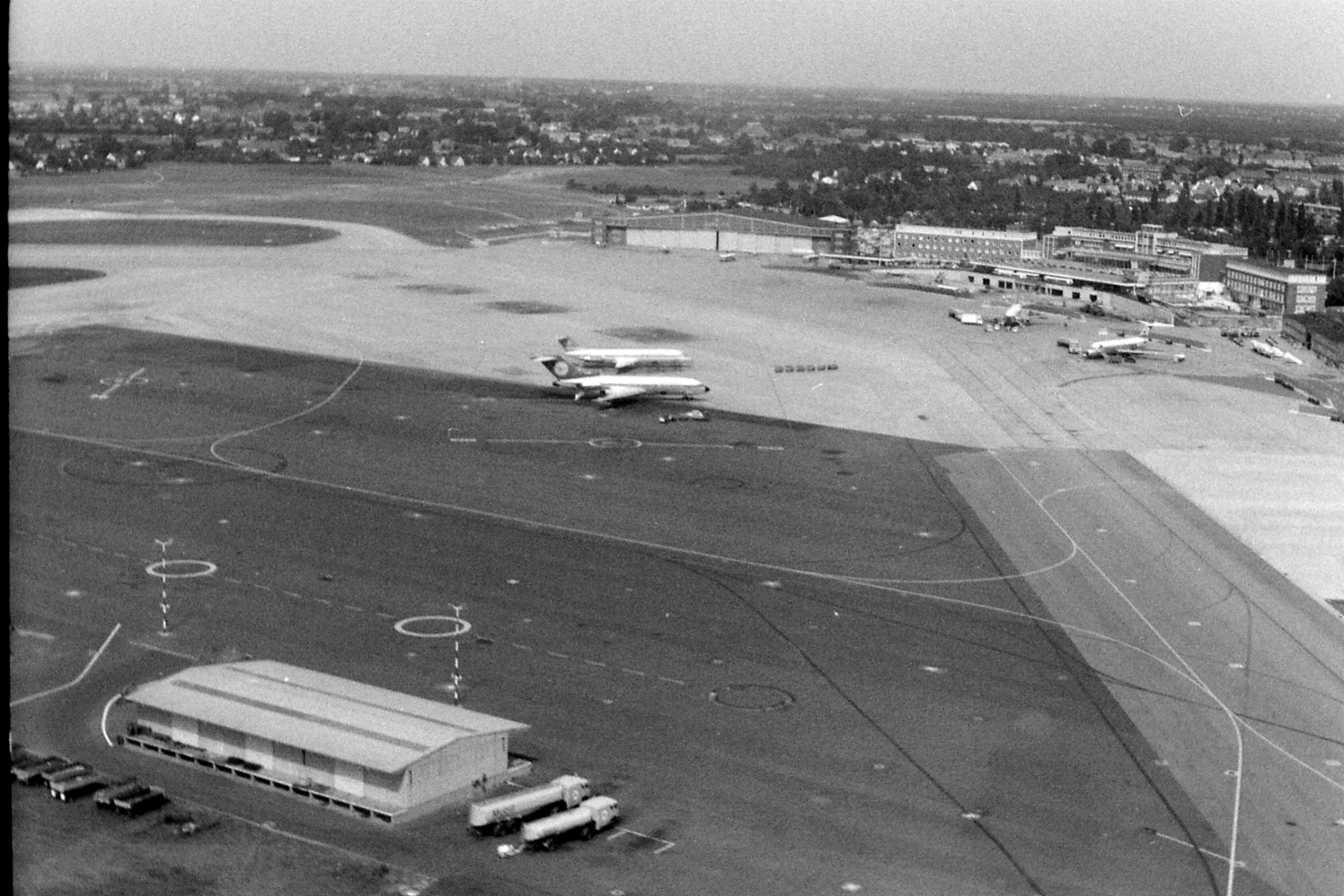
Hamburg Airport in 1968

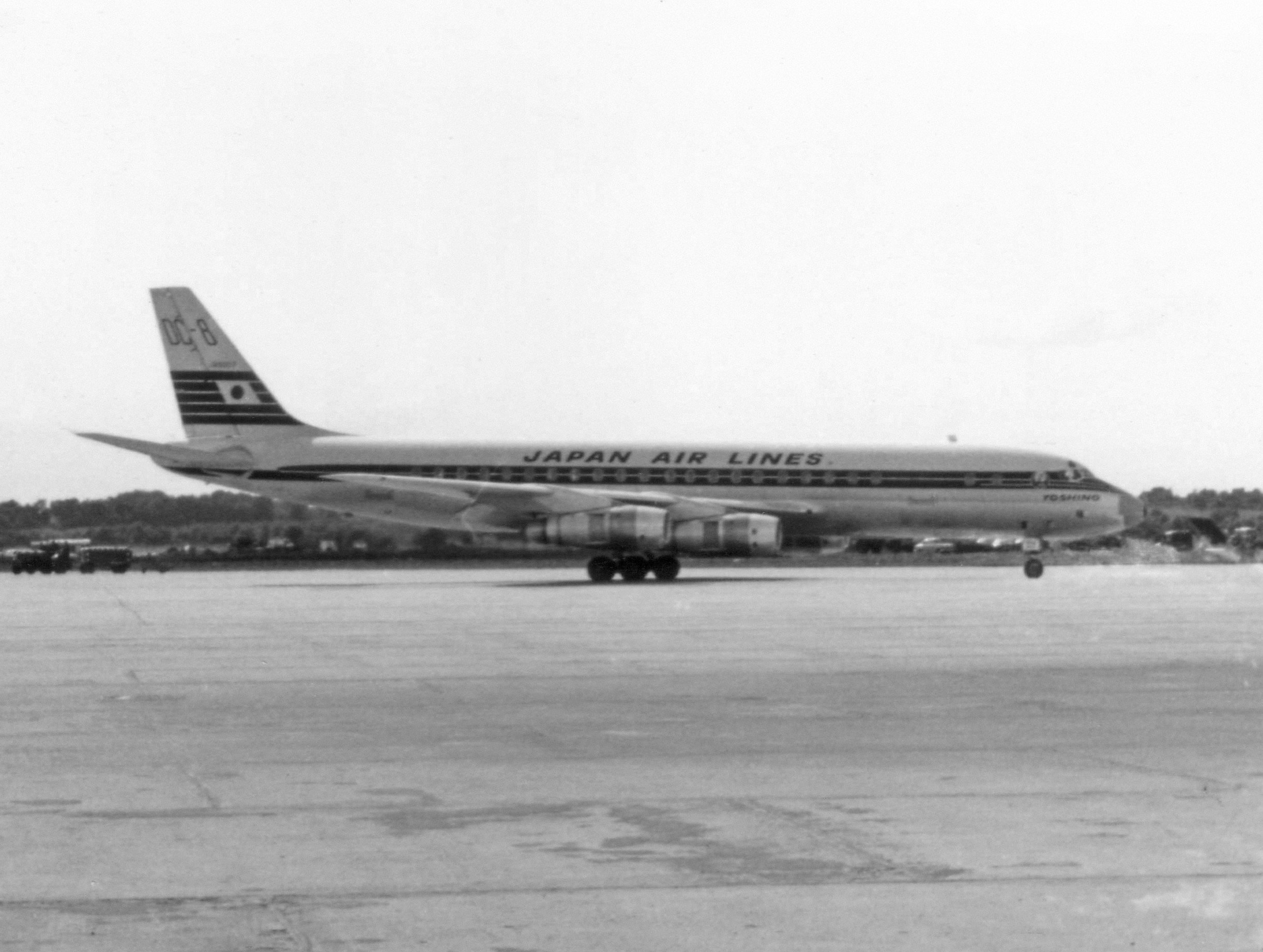
A Japan Airlines Douglas DC-8 at Hamburg Airport in 1965

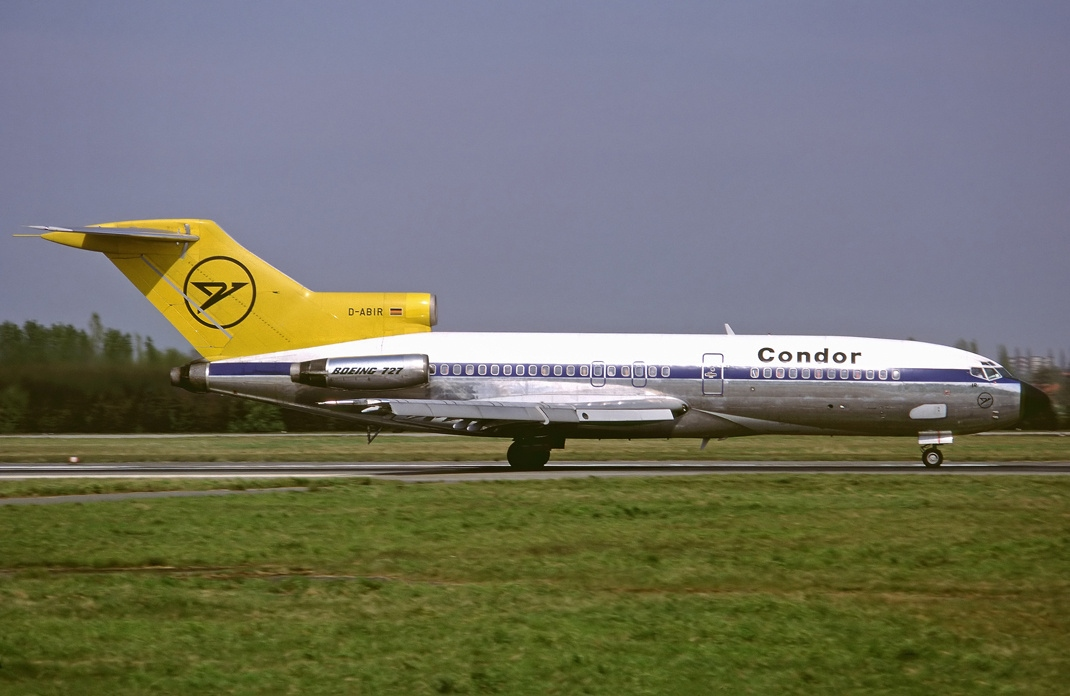
A Condor Boeing 727-30 at Hamburg Airport in 1979

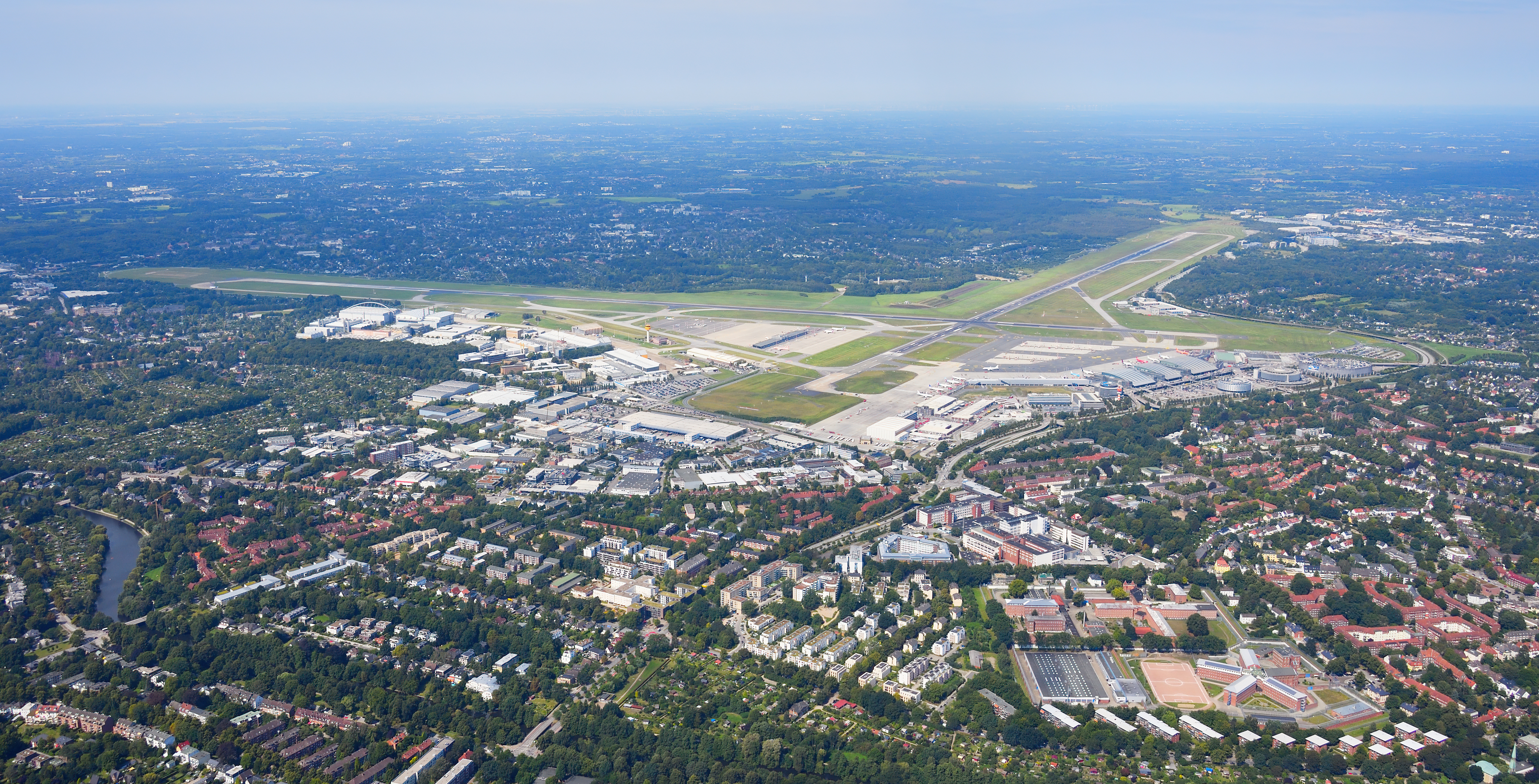
Aerial view of the airport and its surrounding area

The airport was opened in January 1911 from private funding by the Hamburger Luftschiffhallen GmbH (HLG), making it the oldest international airport in the world to still be in operation and the second oldest airport in the country after Tempelhof Airport. The original site comprised 45 hectares, and during its early days was primarily used for airship flights. In 1913 the site was expanded to 60 hectares, the northern part being used for airship operations while the southeast area was used for fixed-wing aircraft.

During the First World War, the airship hangar was used extensively by the German military, until it was destroyed by fire in 1916.

During the British occupation, beginning in 1945, the airport was given its current name, Hamburg Airport. It was used extensively during the Berlin Airlift in 1948 as a staging area, as the northern air corridor went between Hamburg and West Berlin.

When Lufthansa launched passenger operations in 1955, Hamburg was used as a hub until Frankfurt Airport took over due to growth constraints posed by its location in the city. Lufthansa Technik still maintains a large presence at the airport due to the early activities of the airline at the airport. In October 1959 Pan American World Airways was the first airline to start scheduled service with jet aircraft to Hamburg, the routing was New York – London – Hamburg – Copenhagen flown with Boeing 707.

In the 1960s, discussions began with the aim of moving the airport to Heidmoor near Kaltenkirchen. Among the reasons cited were limited expansion possibilities, capacity constraints due to crossing runways, and noise. Lufthansa had introduced the Boeing 707 in 1960, which made more noise than previous piston-engined aircraft. The plans were dropped, owing both to bad experiences in other cities where airports had been moved far from city centres, and to Lufthansa's move to Frankfurt.

In 1980, Northwest Orient started flights to Hamburg, originating from Minneapolis with a stop in London Gatwick. In 1981 they introduced a second flight from New York JFK via Copenhagen to Hamburg. All flights were operated with Boeing 747 aircraft. After Northwest Orient received traffic rights to serve Frankfurt they discontinued all flights to Hamburg from early 1985.

In April 1985, Pan American World Airways started a daily non-stop flight from New York JFK to Hamburg, operated with Boeing 747. This was Pan Am's first non-stop service from the US to Hamburg. Starting February 1986 Pan Am also used their new long-range Airbus A310-200 on the route, which made it one of the first ETOPS routes across the Atlantic. In 1988 Japan Air Lines suspended their flights from Tokyo to Hamburg after serving the route for 24 years. One year later in 1989 Lufthansa suspended all flights between Hamburg and Tokyo after almost 30 years of service, which was the last route from Hamburg to the far east.

In May 1989, American Airlines started a daily service from New York JFK via Brussels to Hamburg, and Delta Air Lines started a daily service from Atlanta via London Gatwick to Hamburg. American Airlines suspended their service after a year due to shortage of aircraft after the purchase of Eastern Air Lines' South America routes, Delta upgraded the Atlanta flight to a daily non-stop service with an extension to Berlin-Tegel from May 1991, and also served New York JFK – Hamburg from November 1991 after taking over Pan Am's North Atlantic route network.

=== Development since the 1990s ===
In March 1990, Lufthansa launched a daily flight from Hamburg to Newark and added another non-stop flight to Miami in 1992. This lasted for only one summer season and was then suspended together with the Newark flight in late 1992, which left Delta Air Lines alone in this market with their Atlanta and New York flights. From early 1993 to late 1994 South African Airways operated flights from Cape Town via Johannesburg and Munich to Hamburg. In the mid-1990s, Delta experienced financial troubles and had to consolidate their fleet and route network. Hamburg was among the cities in Europe that were cut completely in late 1995. From 1996, Canada 3000 started summer seasonal flights to Hamburg and until their bankruptcy in late 2001, they served Toronto to Hamburg via Halifax and Vancouver to Hamburg via Calgary. In May 1998, Delta relaunched daily non-stop flights between Atlanta and Hamburg. However this route only operated until early 2000. The combination of an excessively large business class cabin in their Boeing 767-300ER aircraft and the foundation of the SkyTeam alliance made Delta cancel this service again.

In the early 1990s, the airport began extensive modernisation. The plan, called HAM21, included a new 500-metre (1,600 ft) pier extension, a new terminal (Terminal 1), and the Airport Plaza between Terminals 1 and 2, which includes a consolidated security area. The airport's shareholders are the City of Hamburg and airport management company AviAlliance.

In May 2005, Air Transat started a seasonal flight between Toronto and Hamburg. In June of that year, Continental Airlines started a daily non-stop flight between Newark and Hamburg, Emirates started its then-daily Dubai to Hamburg service in March 2006. In 2011, China Eastern Airlines added Hamburg to their route network. However, due to the lack of traffic rights, they could only add an extension to their existing Shanghai to Frankfurt flights. The flight initially operated once a week only, and was later increased to twice a week. The stop in Frankfurt and the low frequency did not appeal enough to business travellers, and China Eastern suspended the route in 2013.

The Radisson Blu Hotel Hamburg Airport was added in 2009, combined with new roadside access and a station with connection to the city's rapid transit system (Hamburg S-Bahn).

In January 2016, TUIfly announced it was leaving Hamburg Airport entirely due to increasing competition from low-cost carriers. While the summer seasonal routes would not resume, all remaining destinations were cancelled by March 2016. A few weeks later, it was officially announced that the airport was to be named after Helmut Schmidt, a former senator of Hamburg and chancellor of West Germany. On 10 November 2016, the airport was renamed Hamburg Airport Helmut Schmidt.

In October 2016, Air Berlin announced the closure of its maintenance facilities at the airport, due to cost-cutting and restructuring measures.

In June 2017, easyJet announced it would close its base at Hamburg by March 2018 as part of a refocus on other base airports. While over half of the former services were cut, several routes remained in place as they are served from other easyJet bases. In October 2018, United Airlines announced the end of its seasonal service to Newark, leaving the airport with only three long-haul routes, all to the Middle East, and no direct services to North America. The route was inaugurated by Continental Airlines back in 2005 and switched from year-round to seasonal in 2017 Also in October 2018, Emirates switched one of the two daily flights from Dubai to Airbus A380 service. This was the first ever commercial A380 service to Hamburg. The second daily flight remains operated by Boeing 777-300ER aircraft.

In January 2020, Ryanair also closed its Hamburg base due to high operating costs, late delivery of the Boeing 737 MAX aircraft, and its general downsizing of German operations.

== Facilities ==
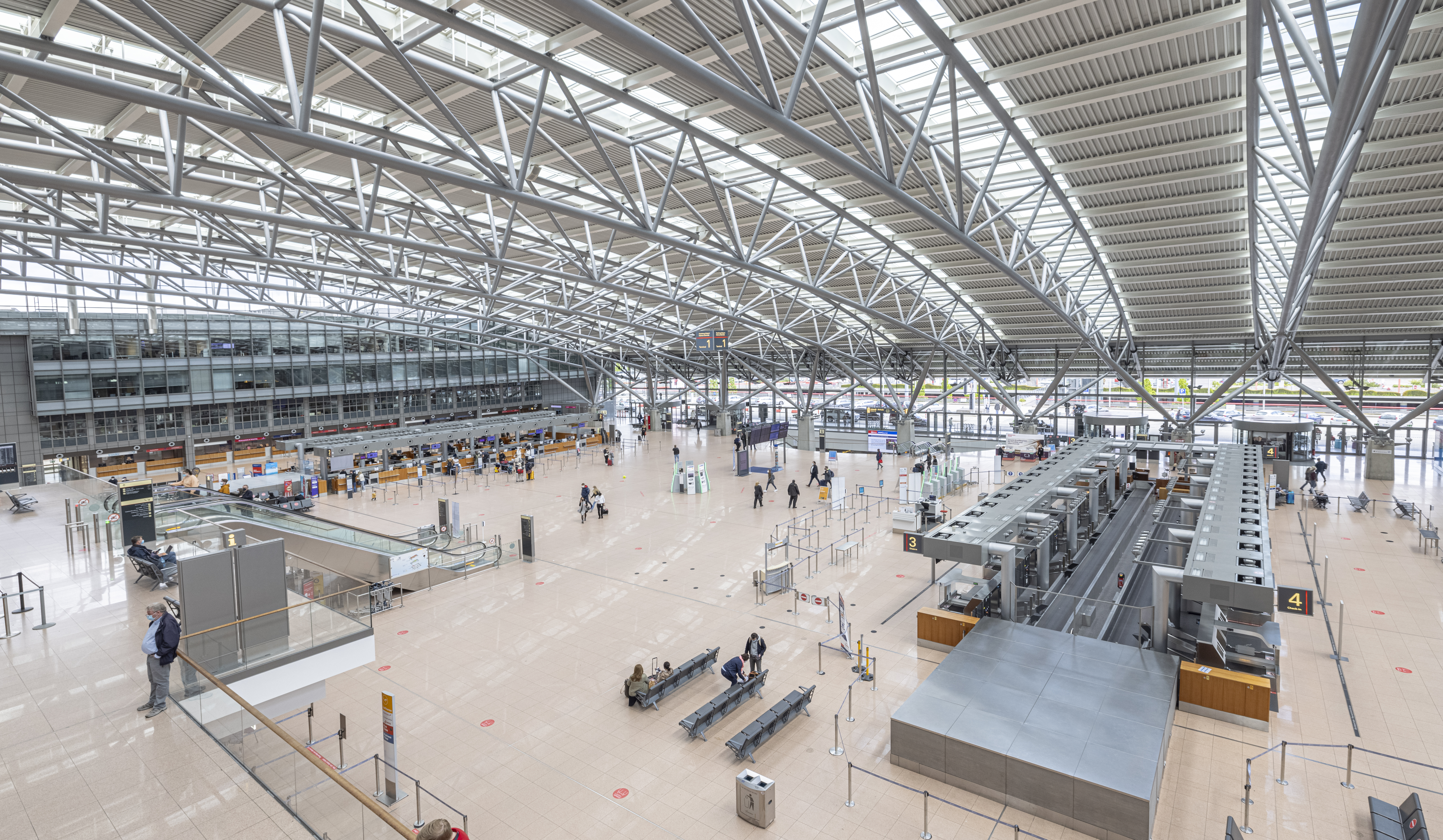
Terminal 1 interior

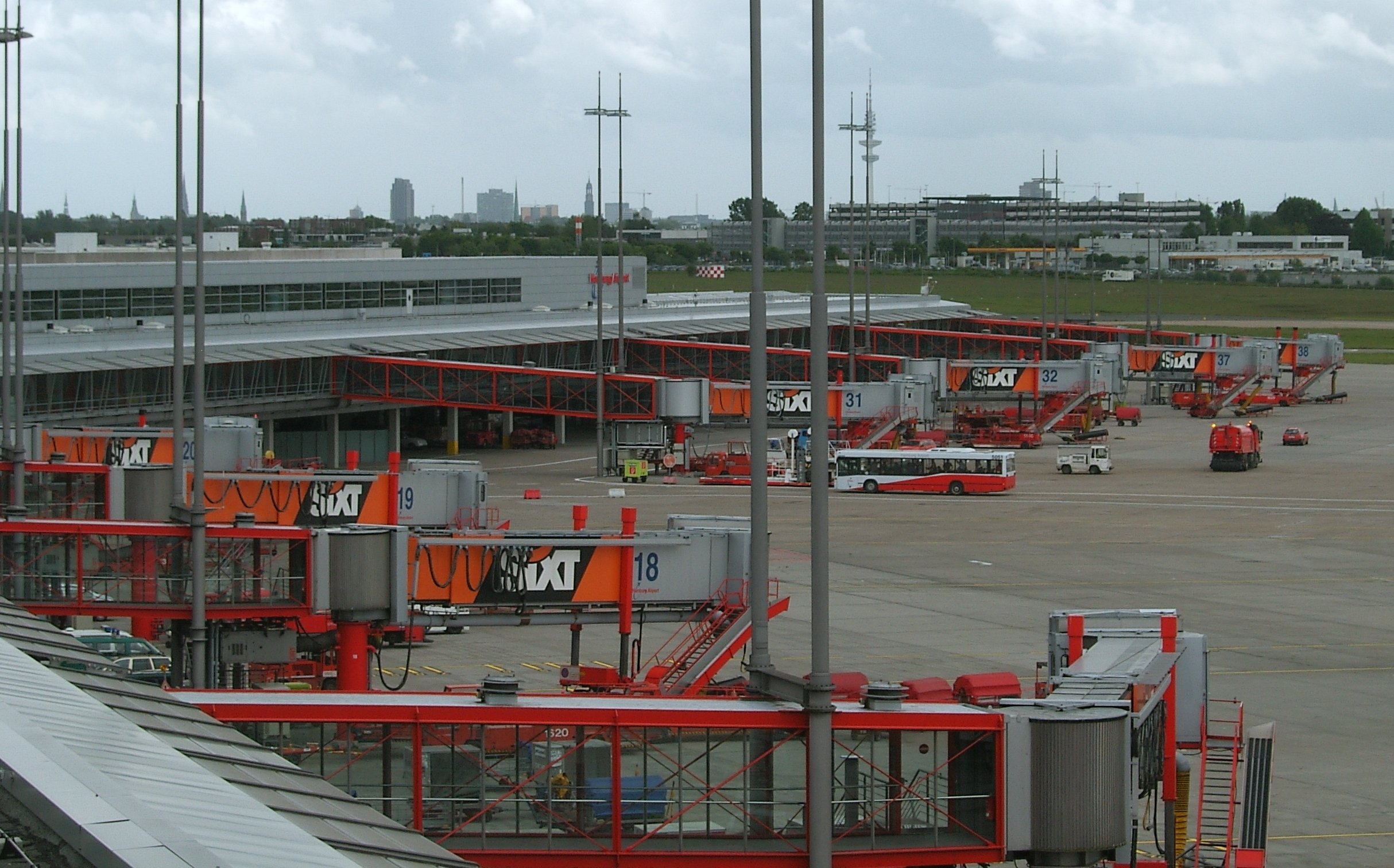
Terminal exterior

=== Overview ===
Hamburg Airport originally covered 440,000 m^{2} (4,700,000 sq ft). Since then, the site has grown more than tenfold to 5.7 km^{2} (2.2 sq mi). The main apron covers 320,000 m^{2} (3,400,000 sq ft) and features 54 parking positions; the passenger terminals provide 17 jet bridges. As of July 2016, the airport had only three routes served with wide-body aircraft; however, during that year three gates were upgraded with double-jet bridges to provide faster boarding and de-boarding for large planes like the Airbus A380. The runways, taxiways and aprons can accommodate large aircraft, including the Airbus A380. Emirates replaced one Boeing 777 with A380 aircraft on the route. On 28 May 2018, Emirates announced it would commence services from Dubai International Airport to Hamburg with the A380.

=== Terminals ===
Hamburg has two interconnected terminals, Terminal 1 (used by most airlines including those of Oneworld and SkyTeam) and Terminal 2 (Star Alliance), connected by the Airport Plaza and the baggage claim area that extends through the lower levels of all three buildings. In all buildings level 1 is the departure level with overall 44 departure gates, while level 0 is arrivals and also features ten additional bus gates. Hamburg Airport offers 12 baggage claim belts on the arrivals level. The Airport Plaza hosts the central security check as well as shops, restaurants, lounges and other service facilities. It also houses the suburban railway station.

Terminal 2 (despite its name, the older facility) was completed in 1993, Terminal 1 was completed in 2005 and is highly similar to Terminal 2 in terms of design and size. The main buildings were designed by Gerkan, Marg and Partners. Both terminals have a high, curved ceiling designed to emulate the shape of a wing.

== Airlines and destinations ==
The following airlines offer regular scheduled and charter flights at Hamburg Airport:

Airlines	Destinations
Aegean Airlines	Athens, Seasonal: Thessaloniki
Aer Lingus	Seasonal: Dublin
airBaltic	Riga, Tallinn; Seasonal: Kuusamo (begins 12 December 2026), Vilnius
Air Cairo	Hurghada
Air France	Paris–Charles de Gaulle
Air Serbia	Belgrade
Air Uniqon (operated by Avanti Air)	Friedrichshafen
AJet	Istanbul–Sabiha Gökçen; Seasonal: Ankara, Bodrum
AlMasria Universal Airlines	Hurghada
Austrian Airlines	Vienna; Seasonal: Klagenfurt
British Airways	London–Heathrow
Brussels Airlines	Brussels
Condor	Frankfurt, Fuerteventura, Funchal, Gran Canaria, Hurghada, Lanzarote, La Palma, Palma de Mallorca, Tenerife–South; Seasonal: Agadir, Chania, Corfu, Faro, Heraklion, Jerez de la Frontera, Kalamata, Kos, Rhodes, Zakynthos
Corendon Airlines	Antalya; Seasonal: Hurghada
Croatia Airlines	Seasonal: Zagreb
DAT	Saarbrücken
easyJet	Basel/Mulhouse, Geneva, London–Gatwick, Manchester, Marrakesh, Milan–Malpensa, Prague (begins 26 October 2026), Rome–Fiumicino, Seville (begins 30 October 2026)
Emirates	Dubai–International
Eurowings	Barcelona, Budapest, Cologne/Bonn, Düsseldorf, Erbil, Fuerteventura, Graz, London–Heathrow, Manchester, Milan–Malpensa, Munich, Nice, Oslo, Palma de Mallorca, Paris–Charles de Gaulle, Pristina, Rome–Fiumicino, Salzburg, Split, Stockholm–Arlanda, Stuttgart, Tel Aviv, Thessaloniki, Vienna, Zürich; Seasonal: Adana/Mersin, Alicante, Bari, Bilbao, Burgas, Cagliari, Catania, Chania, Corfu, Faro, Funchal, Gran Canaria, Heraklion, Hurghada, Ibiza, Innsbruck, Jerez de la Frontera, Kayseri, Kittila, Kos, Lanzarote, La Palma, Larnaca, Lisbon, Málaga, Malta, Marrakesh, Marsa Alam, Mykonos, Naples, Olbia, Porto, Rhodes, Rijeka, Rovaniemi, Tenerife–South, Tromsø, Valencia, Varna, Venice, Verona, Zadar, Zakynthos
Finnair	Helsinki
Freebird Airlines	Seasonal: Antalya
HiSky	Chișinău
Iberia	Madrid
ITA Airways	Seasonal: Milan–Linate
KLM	Amsterdam
LOT Polish Airlines	Warsaw–Chopin
Lufthansa	Frankfurt, Munich
Lufthansa City Airlines	Munich
Luxair	Luxembourg
Marabu	Seasonal: Agadir, Chania, Corfu, Faro, Funchal, Gran Canaria, Heraklion, Hurghada, Jerez de la Frontera, Kos, Lanzarote, La Palma, Málaga, Palma de Mallorca, Preveza, Rhodes, Tenerife-South, Zakynthos
Norwegian Air Shuttle	Oslo, Stockholm–Arlanda
Pegasus Airlines	Ankara, Istanbul–Sabiha Gökçen; Seasonal: Antalya
Qatar Airways	Doha
Royal Jordanian Airlines	Amman–Queen Alia
Ryanair	Alicante, Dublin, Gdańsk, London–Stansted, Palma de Mallorca
Scandinavian Airlines	Copenhagen, Oslo, Stockholm–Arlanda
Sky Alps	Bolzano; Seasonal: Klagenfurt (begins 17 December 2026)
Sky Express	Athens
SunExpress	Antalya, İzmir; Seasonal: Ankara, Dalaman
Swiss International Air Lines	Zürich; Seasonal: Geneva
TAP Air Portugal	Lisbon
Tunisair	Monastir
Turkish Airlines	Istanbul
Volotea	Seasonal: Florence, Lyon, Nantes
Vueling	Barcelona; Seasonal: Bilbao
Widerøe	Bergen
Wizz Air	Belgrade, Chișinău, Gdańsk, Kutaisi, Podgorica, Pristina (begins 15 December 2026), Sibiu, Skopje, Sofia, Tirana, Tuzla, Varna, Yerevan

== Statistics ==
=== Passengers and movements ===
	Passengers	Movements	Freight (in t)
2000	▲9,949,269	▲164,932	▲48,669
2001	▼9,490,432	▼158,569	▼43,076
2002	▼8,946,505	▼150,271	▼40,871
2003	▲9,529,924	▼149,362	▼36,018
2004	▲9,893,700	▲151,434	▲37,080
2005	▲10,676,016	▲156,180	▼32,677
2006	▲11,954,117	▲168,395	▲38,211
2007	▲12,780,631	▲173,516	▲44,204
2008	▲12,838,350	▼172,067	▼37,266
2009	▼12,229,319	▼157,487	▼31,595
2010	▲12,962,429	▼157,180	▼27,330
2011	▲13,558,261	▲158,076	▲27,588
2012	▲13,697,402	▼152,890	▲28,174
2013	▼13,502,553	▼143,802	▲28,302
2014	▲14,760,280	▲153,879	▲28,948
2015	▲15,610,072	▲158,398	▲31,294
2016	▲16,223,968	▲160,904	▲35,284
2017	▲17,622,997	▼159,780	▲36,863
2018	▼17,231,687	▼156,388	▼33,473
2019	▲17,308,773	▲160,146	▲ -
2020	▼5,632,367	▼55,261	▲ -
2021	▲6,109,402	▲60,402	▲ -
2022	▲11,097,688	▲109,856	▲ -
2023	▲13,599,732	▲122,315	▲ -
2024	▲14,830,000	▲120,300	▲ -
Sources: ADV, Hamburg Airport

=== Busiest routes ===
Busiest routes from Hamburg (2019)
Rank	Destination	Passengers	Operating Airlines
1	Munich	1,750,284	Eurowings, Lufthansa
2	Frankfurt	1,422,950	Condor, Lufthansa
3	London (all airports)	978,500	British Airways, easyJet, Eurowings, Ryanair
4	Palma de Mallorca	882,830	Condor, Eurowings, Ryanair
5	Stuttgart	737,285	Eurowings
6	Vienna	710,162	Austrian Airlines, Eurowings, LEVEL
7	Zürich	699,800	Eurowings, Swiss
8	Düsseldorf	524,114	Eurowings
9	Antalya	498,966	Condor, Corendon Airlines, Freebird Airlines, SunExpress
10	Amsterdam	477,618	Eurowings, KLM
Total number of passengers embarking direct flights doubled (no connecting passengers).

== Ground transportation ==
The airport is around 8 km (5.0 mi) north of Hamburg city centre and 8 km (5.0 mi) south of Norderstedt in the borough of Fuhlsbüttel.

=== Rail ===
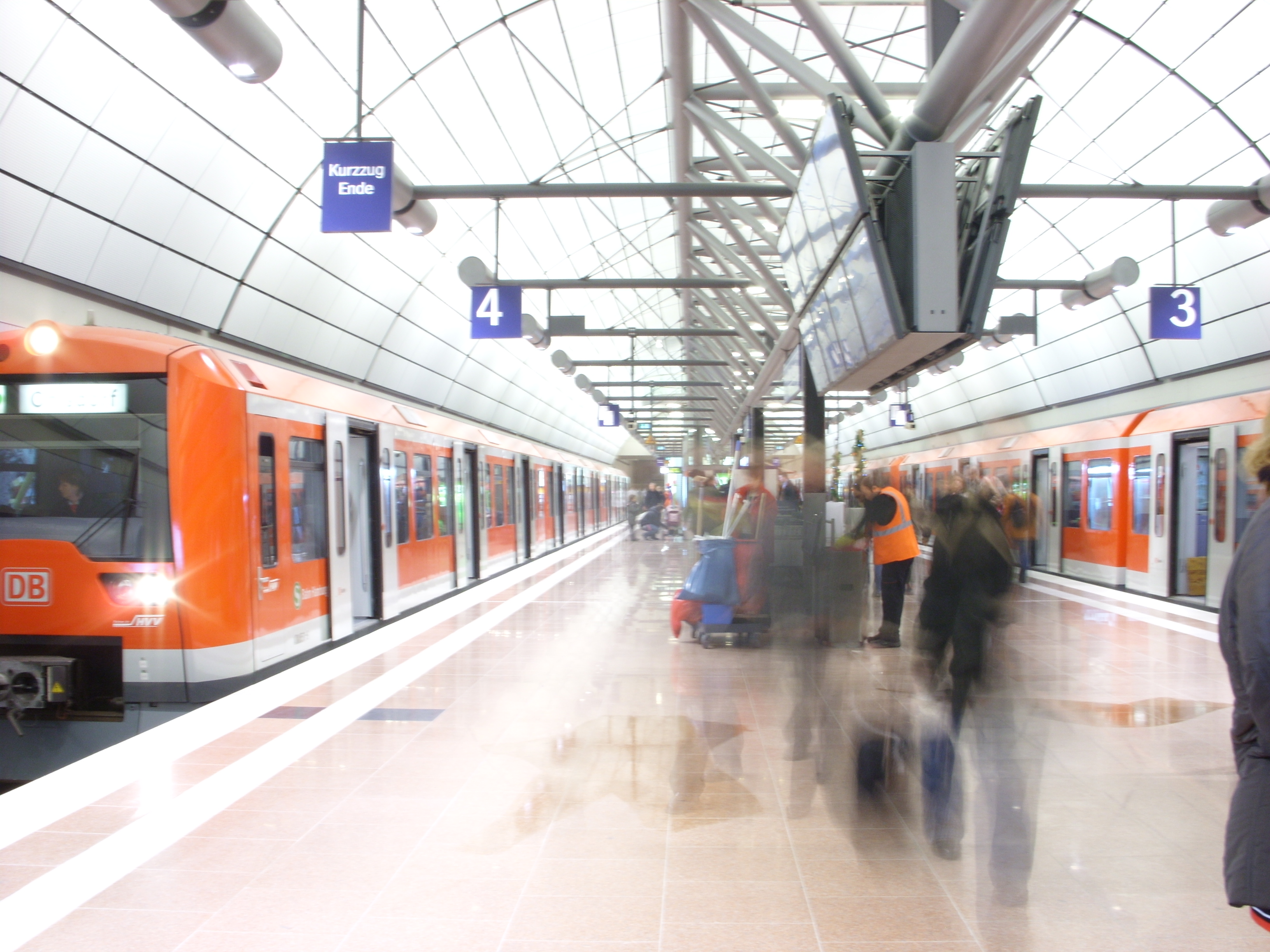
Hamburg Airport station

The S-Bahn Hamburg service S1 departs every ten minutes and connects the airport with Ohlsdorf, Wandsbek, Hamburg central station, Altona, Blankenese, and Wedel. It is part of the Hamburg transport association (abbreviated as HVV) which is a fare organisation offering tickets for all modes of public transportation in Hamburg. Going towards the airport, the S1 S-Bahn operates as dividing train and splits at Ohlsdorf station, with one part of the train going to the airport and the other going to Poppenbüttel.

=== Car ===
By road, the airport can be reached from Federal Motorway A7 via Exit Schnelsen using the state motorway B433, which is Hamburg's third ring road.

=== Bus ===
The airport is also linked by some local bus routes of HVV to nearby areas as well as regular coach services to the cities of Kiel and Neumünster.

== Incidents and accidents ==
- On 4–5 November 2023, a hostage incident caused by a custody dispute, wherein an armed man drove onto the tarmac with his 4-year-old daughter in the car, temporarily halted flights at the airport. He parked under a Turkish Airlines aircraft demanding to be allowed on board to fly to Turkey with his daughter. He fired a weapon twice in the air and threw two incendiary devices from his car. Authorities said the commercial flight was preparing to take off, forcing the evacuation of everyone on board through a gangway. The authorities believe the cause was a "custody dispute". The incident came three weeks after German federal police received an emailed threat of an attack on an Iran Air flight arriving at the airport. The perpetrator was sentenced to 12 years imprisonment by a Hamburg court.

== See also ==
- Transport in Germany
- List of airports in Germany
- Hamburg Finkenwerder Airport
