= Air Anka =

Turkish airline

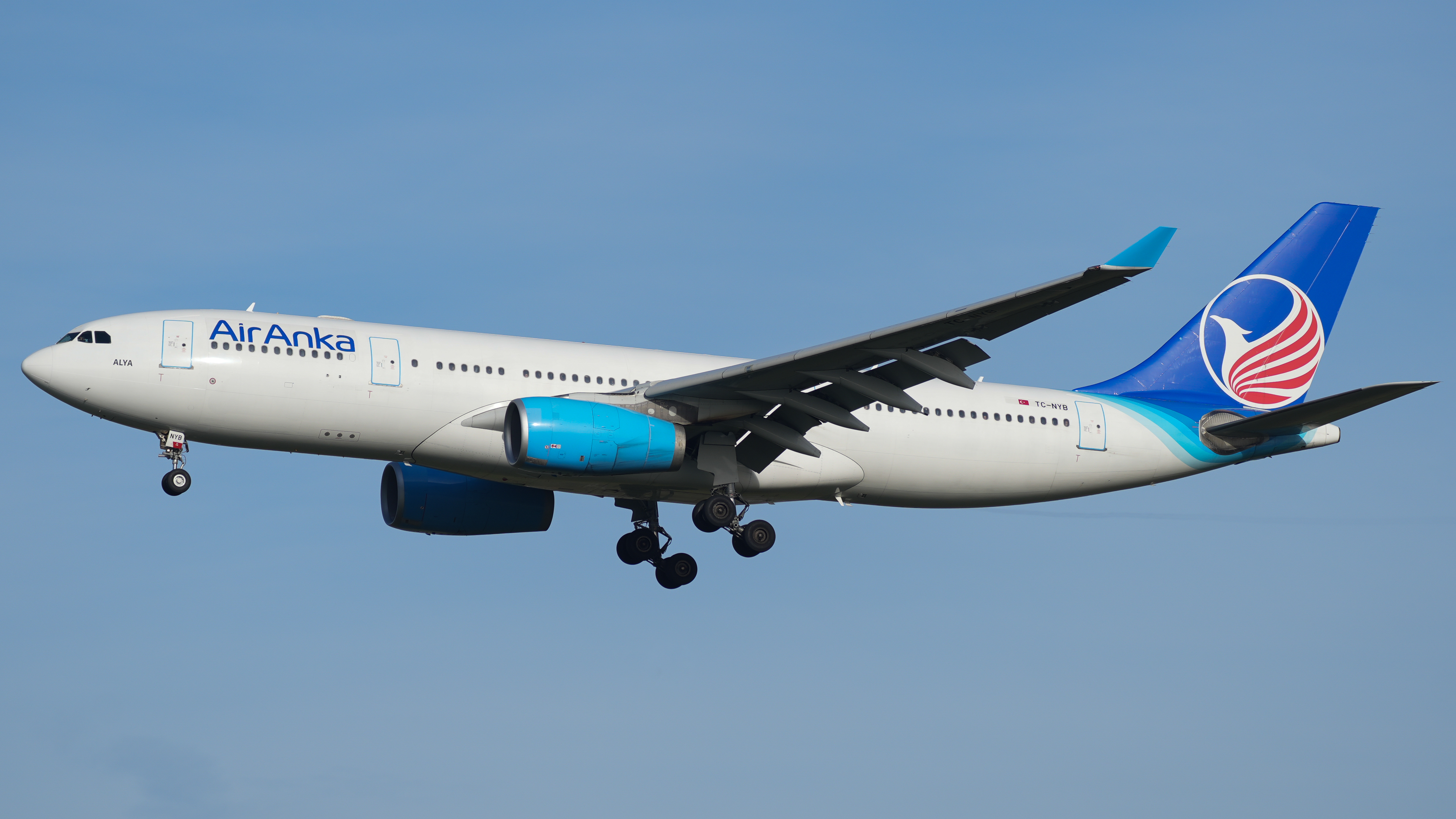
- An Air Anka Airbus A330-200
IATA	ICAO	Call sign
6K	TAH	AIR ANKA
- Founded: 2021; 5 years ago
- Hubs: İzmir Adnan Menderes Airport
- Fleet size: 3
- Headquarters: İzmir, Turkey
- Website: www.airanka.com.tr

Air Anka is a Turkish airline founded in 2021. Based out of İzmir, it started operations as a cargo airline in mid 2022, but switched to passenger flights in early 2023.

== History ==
Based in İzmir, Turkey, Air Anka was founded in 2021. Plans in 2022 indicated that it would be a cargo airline. It started hiring crew in March 2022. The airline received its air operator's certificate from the Directorate General of Civil Aviation in August 2022. Two of its aircraft were stored at Atatürk Airport at the time. A test flight was carried out from Istanbul to Ankara on 15 August. In January 2023, the carrier also received permits to fly passengers. Later that month, it sponsored Survivor Turkey and made its first revenue passenger flight by flying contestants of the show to the Dominican Republic. It was sold to Odin Aviation in October 2023.

== Fleet ==
As of August 2025, Air Anka operates the following aircraft:

Air Anka fleet
Aircraft	Total	Orders	Passengers	Notes
Airbus A330-200	2	—		
Airbus A330-300	1	—		
Total	3	—		
