= Aviation in Moldova =

Aviation has been a part of Moldovan society since the early 20th century.

== History ==
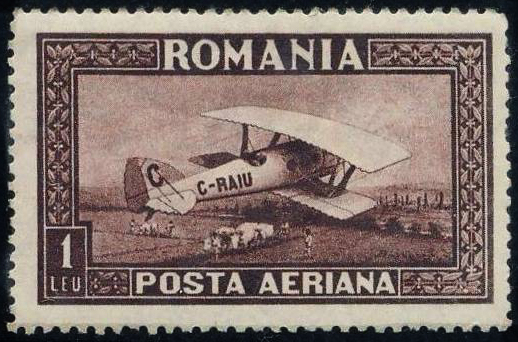
1928 airmail stamp

On June 1, 1922, the first aircraft (de Havilland DH.9) started on a 410 kilometres (250 mi) long line: Bucharest – Galaţi – Chişinău.

The first scheduled flights to Chişinău started on 24 June 1926, on the route Bucharest – Galaţi – Chişinău and Bălţi. The flights were operated by Compagnie Franco-Roumaine de Navigation Aérienne - CFRNA, later LARES. The airport was near Chişinău, at Bulgarica-Ialoveni. This first flight Chişinău-Bucharest was marked by the launch of postal stamps. At the Chișinău Eugen Doga International Airport, at the visitors terrace in the second floor (opened in December 2006), there is a sign in remembrance of the first flight on 24 June 1926.

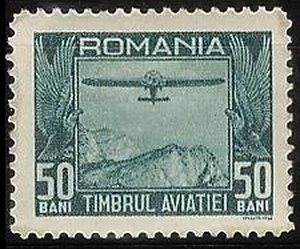
1931 aviation stamp

A 10-passenger Armstrong Siddeley Jaguar-powered Farman F.168Bn4 started in May 1928 to operate the domestic air service Bucharest – Galaţi – Chişinău-Bălţi. In that years, planes were used for passenger, newspapers and mail.

In 1936, Nadia Russo (1901–1988), from Chişinău, was one of the first women from Romania to obtain a flying licence. In 1937, she bought her Bücker Bü 131, half of price was paid by the Romanian Ministry of Air and the other half by public subscription in Chişinău. Nadia Russo returned to Bălţi with White Squadron in 1941.

In 1937 there was an air service Bucharest - Cetatea Albă - Chişinău - Bălţi.

On June 28, 1938, in Chişinău was held an air rally.

During the year 1940, LARES operated daily the route Bălţi - Chişinău - Iaşi - Galaţi - Bucharest (the air service number 2116).

In the interwar period, among the pilots serving on flights from Chişinău to Bucharest was Constantin Bâzu Cantacuzino. Nadia Russo flew with the White Squadron to Bălţi.

During the Second World War, Bălţi became the centre of aeronautic activity in Bessarabia with five different runways in and around the city of Bălţi with most prominent pilots battling over Bălţi coming from Jagdgeschwader 77 and 55th Fight Regiment, most notably Alexander Pokryshkin and Reinhard Heydrich. While Pokryshkin became one of the highest scoring Soviet aces, Heydrich was an unexperienced pilot who never achieved an aerial victory.

=== Moldavian branch of Aeroflot ===
On 19 September 1944, the first unit of Po-2 transport aircraft arrived in Chişinău and the Moldovan Squadron of Aeroflot was established. Aside from fifteen Po-2 aircraft operating domestic flights and serving in agriculture, there were also two Li-2, which were used on flights to Moscow, some Ukrainian cities and to Black Sea and Caucasus summer resorts.

In 1958, the Civil Aviation Squadron of Bălți (Бельцкая АЭ - Авиационная Эскадрилья) was formed in addition to the Moldaivan Special Aviation Group of the Civil Air Fleet (Молдавская ОАГ ГВФ - Особая Авиационная Группа Гражданского Воздушного Флота)

Intra-Soviet flights were operated from Chisinau and from Balti. A new building of passenger terminal at Bălți City Airport was constructed in 1954. A new airport in Chişinău able to accommodate gas turbine aircraft opened early in the 1960s, while Balti served as a regional airport for intra-Moldovan and intra-Soviet flights and for agricultural use.

The enterprise received status of Civil Aviation Administration in 1965 and new An-10, An-12, and An-24 aircraft expanded its fleet both in Chisinau and in Balti.

Since 1966, there were two independent Flight Units in Moldova: Chisianu Flight Unit No 253 and Balti Flight Unit No 281, both subordinated to the Directorate for Civil Aviation of the Moldavian Soviet Socialist Republic.

Regular flights to many cities in the USSR begun and the transportation of fruits and vegetables grown in Moldovan SSR to the largest industrial centers of the USSR were established.

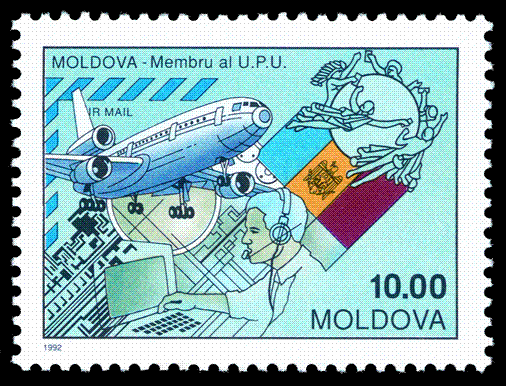
1992 airmail stamp

The first jet aircraft, a Tupolev Tu-134, began service in Moldova in 1971 and became the main aircraft of the enterprise, increasing in number until at one point 26 of them were in use. In Chişinău there was even a USSR test basis for aircraft of this type. The fleet was further enlarged in 1972 with the Yak-42 regional aircraft and in 1974 with the An-26 cargo aircraft. In the middle of the 1980s, Moldovan operations received ten Tu-154 aircraft. At the same time started the construction of a new runway for a new location of Bălți International Airport. At that time Moldovan aircraft flew to 73 cities in the USSR and carried over 1,000,000 passengers per year from Chisinau whereas 20 Soviet cities were connected with direct flights from Bălţi. In 1990 the first international route between Chişinău and Frankfurt am Main was opened. In the beginning of 90's international routes from Bălţi included Istanbul, Moscow, Sochi and Frankfurt, but since 1994 most regular fights from Bălţi were ceased due to the informal directive not to operate international airports around 150 km of Chisinau. Passenger and cargo charter fights continued to be operated from Bălţi until 2015, when the operational certificate for Bălţi International Airport was withdrawn by Civil Aviation Administration.

The most important accident in Chisinau was the 1979 Ukraine Aeroflot mid-air collision. The new runway built in 1987 at Bălți International Airport is located at the highest altitude (231m ASL) as compared to most surrounding airports in Moldova, as well as in Romania and Ukraine.

=== Air Moldova ===
Air Moldova was established after the independence of Moldova and started operations in 1992 on the basis of the local Aeroflot unit. It is wholly owned by the Republic of Moldova and on 13 July 2004, Air Moldova became an IATA member. It suspended all operations on 3 May 2023.

=== Moldaeroservice ===
Moldaeroservice was established in 1966 and became largest state owned aviation enterprise in Moldova, employing 500 persons, being operator of two airports Bălți City Airport and Bălți International Airport, airfields in Bender and Soroca and airline with a branch in Chișinău, airline operating ambulance flights, regional transport, agricultural and police border flights.

== Airlines of Moldova ==
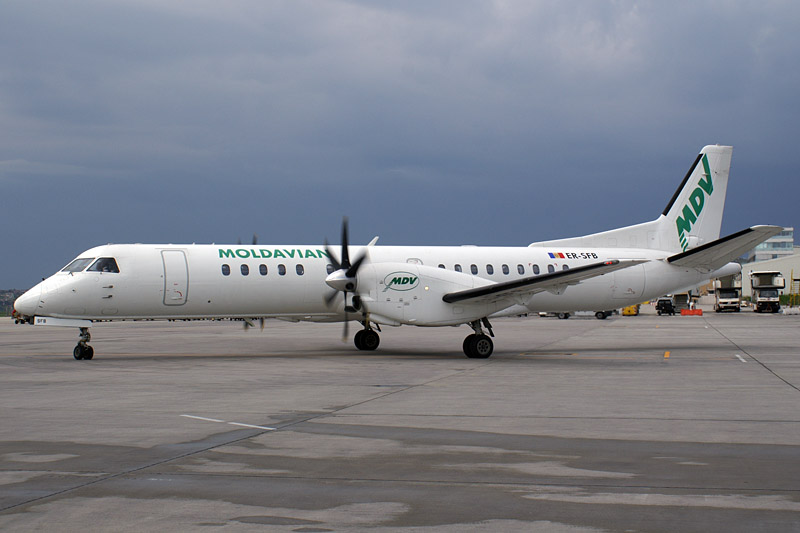
Established in 1994, Moldavian Airlines was the first private airline in Moldova

- FlyOne
- Hisky
- Moldaeroservice
- Terra Avia
- Aerotranscargo

=== Defunct airlines of Moldova ===
- AerianTur-M
- Aerocom
- Aeronord
- Air Moldova
- Grixona
- Moldavian Airlines
- Nobil Air
- Pecotox Air
- Tandem Aero
- Tepavia Trans

== Airports ==
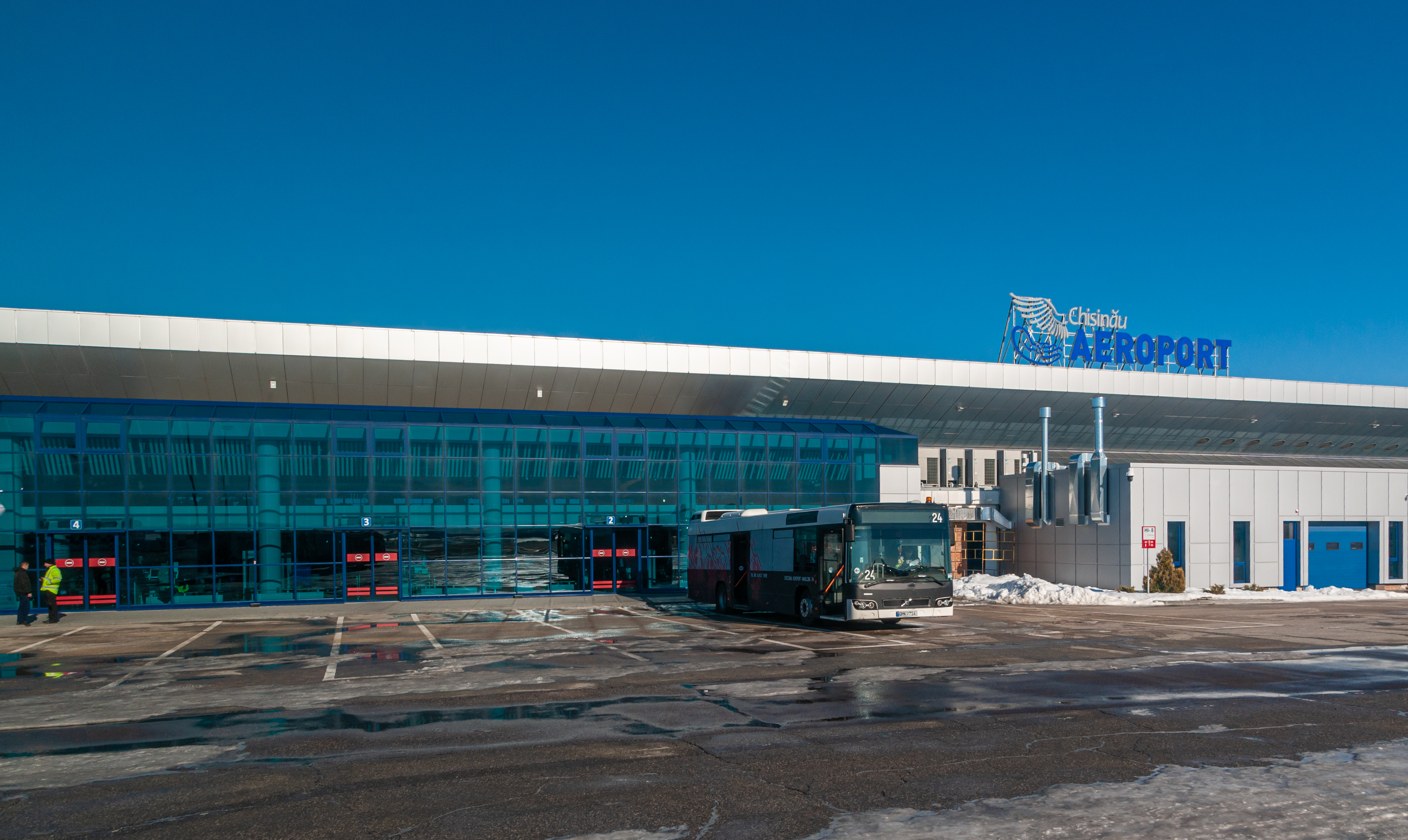
Chișinău Eugen Doga International Airport

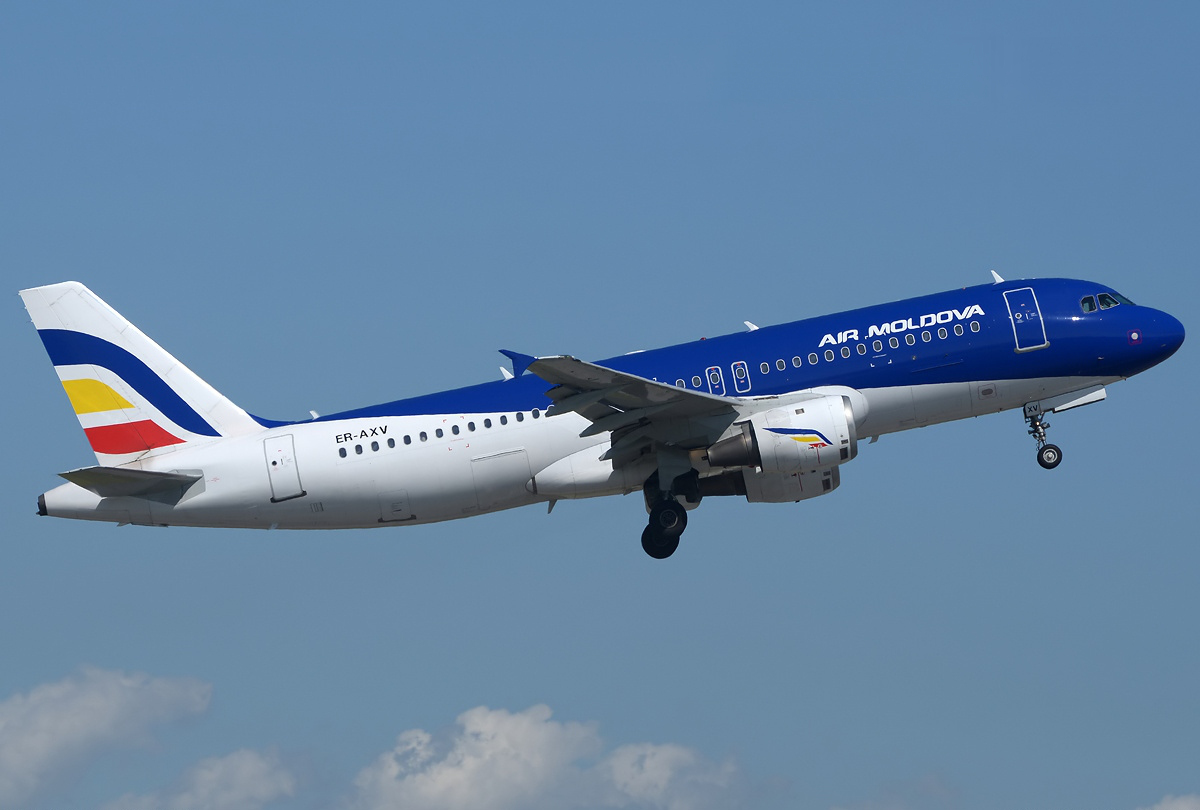
Air Moldova

There are two main international airports in Moldova: Chișinău Eugen Doga International Airport with the main terminal built in the 1970s with a capacity of 3 million passengers per year. On 31 May 1995 Chişinău Airport was awarded the status of an international airport, and Bălți International Airport, built for a capacity of up to 2,5 million passengers, which started operation of regular flights in 1989 and was granted status of international airport in 2001.

Chișinău Eugen Doga International Airport has commercial flights (approximately 20 destinations and 688,000 passengers in 2007).

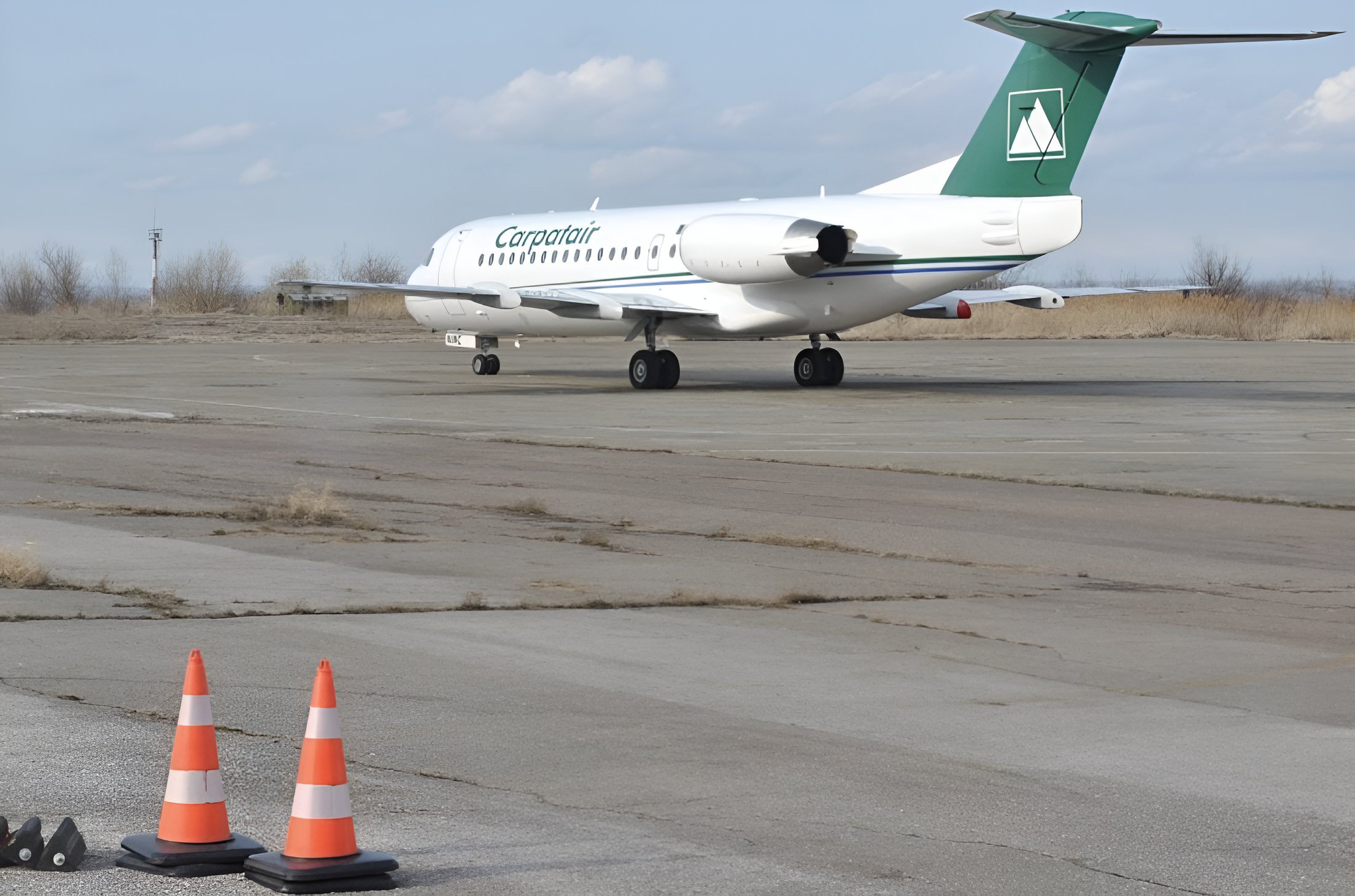
Fokker 70 of airline Carpatair at apron of Bălți International Airport

Bălți International Airport operated regular flights to approximately 14 destinations between 1989 and 1993. In 2000-2001 regular flights Bălți-Istanbul were resumed at Balti International Airport. In 2013 the Moldovan Authority for Civil Aviation inspected Bălți International Airport and certified its services. In accordance with the action plan report dated 1 March 2013, established as part of an inspection carried out by the Moldovan Civil Aviation Authority, the following services were inspected at Bălți-Leadoveni Airport: passenger and baggage service, general services, ticket office and air terminal, passenger transportation, baggage service.

There were also unfortunate attempts to reanimate Cahul International Airport and to transform the military air field Marculesti into an airport.

=== Airports - with paved runways ===
total: 7
over 3,047 m (9,997 ft): 1
2,438 to 3,047 m (7,999 to 9,997 ft): 2
1,524 to 2,437 m (5,000 to 7,995 ft): 2
under 914 m (2,999 ft): 1 (2006 est.)

=== Airports - with unpaved runways ===
total: 6
914 to 1,523 m (2,999 to 4,997 ft): 3
under 914 m (2,999 ft): 3 (2006 est.)

== Civil Aviation Administration ==
The State Civil Aviation Administration of Moldova is the central specialized, executive, coordinating and control body of the Public Administration in the field of civil aviation, founded by the Government of Moldova. The Administration takes decisions of the administrative character, approves regulations, norms, instructions and other normative acts obligatory for natural and legal persons who perform their activity in the field of civil aviation.

== Moldovan Air Force ==
Roundel of Moldova's aircraft

The Moldovan Air Force is the national air force of Moldova. It was formed following Moldova's independence from the Soviet Union in August 1991 and is part of the Military of Moldova.
