= List of defunct airlines of Moldova =

This is a list of defunct airlines of Moldova.

Airline	Image	IATA	ICAO	Callsign	Commenced operations	Ceased operations	Notes
AerianTur-M			TUM		1994	2007	
Aerocom			MCC		1998	2004	
Aerom			AMM		2004	2007	
Aeronord			NRP		2006	2007	
AIM Air			AAM		2012	2018	
Air Bridge Group					1997	2004	
Air Moldova		9U	MLD		1993	2023	
Air Moldova International		3R;RM	MLV		1995	2002	
Air Wings			BSB		2004	2004	
Airline Transport Incorporation			RIN		2001	2005	
Grixona			GXA		2005	2007	
Jet Line International			MJL		2000	2007	
Moldavian Airlines		2M	MDV	MOLDAVIAN	1994	2014	
Nobil Air			NBL	NOBIL AIR	2003	2015	Rebranded as Classica Air
Pecotox-Air			PXA	Pecotex	2000	2007	
Renan Air			RAN		1991	2003	
Sud Aerocargo					1994	2001	
Tandem Aero		TQ	TDM	TANDEM	1998	2019	
Tepavia Trans			TET		1999	2006	
Tiramavia			TVI		1998	2007	
Valan International Cargo Charter			VLN		1999	2007	
Valeologia			VLG		1991	1994	
Vichi Air Company			VIH		1993	2004	

== See also ==
- List of airlines of Moldova
- List of airports in Moldova
