= List of airlines of Moldova =

This is a list of airlines currently operating in Moldova.

== Scheduled airlines ==
Airline	Image	IATA	ICAO	Callsign	Hub airport(s)	Commenced operations
FlyOne		5F	FIA	FIA AIRLINES	Chișinău International Airport	2016
HiSky		H4	HYS	SKY EUROPE	Chișinău International Airport	2021
SkyUp Nistru		4V	SQY	SKY TIRAS	Chișinău International Airport	2025

== Charter airlines ==
Airline	Image	IATA	ICAO	Callsign	Hub airport(s)	Commenced operations
Classica Air			NBL		Chișinău International Airport	2015
Continental Airways (Moldova)			CNW		Chișinău International Airport	2014
MEGAviation			ARM		Chișinău International Airport	2014
Moldaeroservice			MLE	MOLDAERO	Bălți City Airport, Bălți International Airport and Chișinău International Airport	1958
Pecotox Air			PXA	Pecotox	Chișinău International Airport	2001

== Cargo airlines ==
Airline	Image	IATA	ICAO	Callsign	Hub airport(s)	Commenced operations
Fly Pro		FP	PVV	SUNDAY	Chișinău International Airport	2016
Aerotranscargo		F5	ATG	MOLDCARGO	Chișinău International Airport	2012

== See also ==
- List of defunct airlines of Moldova
- List of airlines
- List of defunct airlines of Europe
