= Blue Air =

Romanian low-cost airline

IATA	ICAO	Call sign
0B	BLA	BLUE AIR
- Founded: 2004
- Commenced operations: 2004
- Ceased operations: 6 September 2022 (suspension); 21 March 2023 (insolvency)
- AOC #: RO-055
- Operating bases: Henri Coandă International Airport
- Hubs: Henri Coandă International Airport
- Frequent-flyer program: My Blue
- Fleet size: 2
- Destinations: 75
- Parent company: State-owned (75 %)
- Headquarters: Bucharest, Romania
- Key people: Cristian Rada, CEO
- Revenue: ▼€108 million (2020)
- Net income: ▼€81.1 million (2020)
- Employees: 1,058 (2021)
- Website: flyblueair.com

Blue Air was a Romanian low-cost airline headquartered in Bucharest, with its hub at Henri Coandă International Airport. It was the largest Romanian airline by scheduled passengers flown. In 2017, Blue Air carried over 5 million passengers, a 40% increase over the 3.6 million passengers flown the previous year. As of September 2022, Blue Air served 75 scheduled destinations in 21 countries.

Blue Air was forced to suspend all operations on 6 September 2022. In November 2022, its license was suspended, and the now-dormant airline was nationalized in December 2022. In March 2023, Blue Air subsequently filed for insolvency.

== History ==
=== Foundation and early years ===
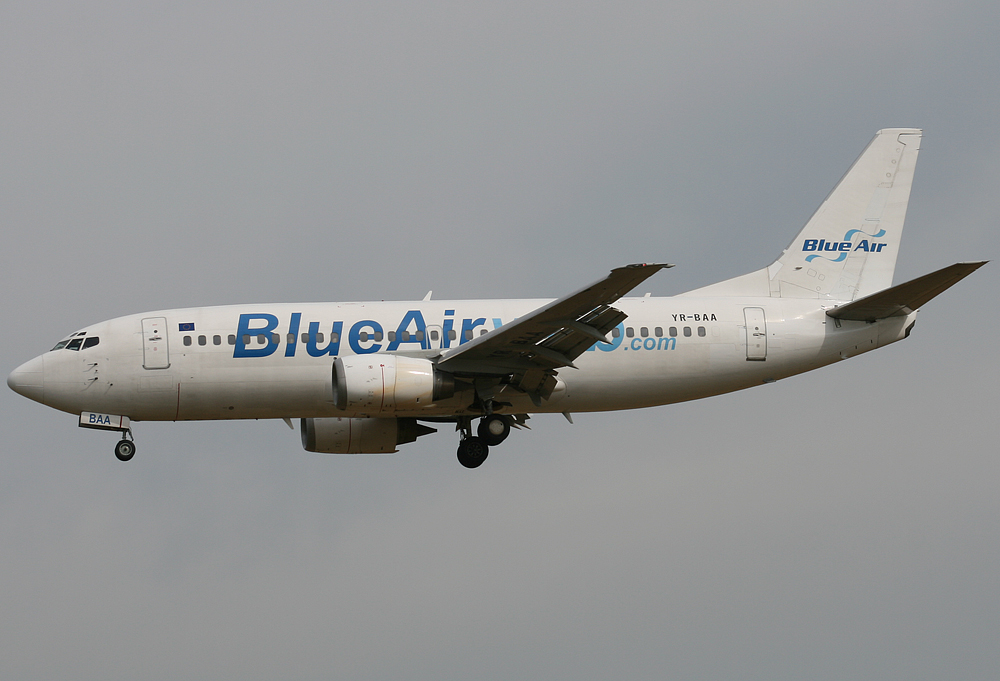
Blue Air Boeing 737-300 (registered YR-BAA) in 2010 showcasing an older livery

Founded by Nelu Iordache, Blue Air started operating in December 2004. Blue Air initially operated domestic and international flights, although domestic services were soon discontinued due to low sales and competition from TAROM, as well as Căile Ferate Române, the Romanian rail company. Blue Air resumed domestic operations in 2015, starting with Bucharest to Iași flights.

On 12 April 2013, Blue Air's management announced that the airline was for sale. On 17 May 2013, the company was purchased by four Romanian shareholders, and BlueAir Transport Aerian SA's flight operations were transferred to Blue Air – Airline Management Solution SRL, a company that bailed the business out with EUR 30 million. In 2015, Blue Air reported a net profit of EUR 6 million, contrasting to the company's loss of EUR 400,000 in 2014.

The airline transported 1.5 million passengers in 2014, an increase from the 1.35 million passengers in 2013. In 2015, the airline transported for the first time more than 2 million passengers. With a total of 25 new routes announced for 2016, the airline forecasts carrying close to three million passengers in 2016.

Blue Air became a full member of the International Air Transport Association (IATA) on 19 January 2016. Furthermore, Blue Air received the IATA Operational Safety Audit certification in December 2015, being a member of the IATA Clearing House.

In March 2017, Blue Air started a base in Liverpool John Lennon Airport, operating to 8 destinations across Europe. Blue Air also created a 'welcome to Liverpool' Livery for their Boeing 737-800 aircraft (YR-BMH). This aircraft included slogans such as 'Cool city, Warm welcome' and 'Liverpool Music city' to help use the aircraft to promote its new base in Liverpool, England, by flying this logo jet across Europe. This aircraft is also the only full special livery aircraft within the Blue Air fleet.

Since November 2017, with the entry into force of the Territorial Continuity in Sardinia, Blue Air connects the Alghero airport with the Rome-Fiumicino Airport, a route operated in the past by Alitalia. The airline, following a conference held at Alghero Airport in early November, announced that the Riviera del Corallo became his fourth international base of operations, after those in Torino, Liverpool and Larnaca. In January 2018, Blue Air planned to launch a new subsidiary in the Czech Republic, known as Blue Air Moravia; however, this never took place.

=== Developments since 2018 ===
In 2018, the legal status of the company was changed, from a limited liability company to a joint-stock company; it also changed its legal name to Blue Air Aviation SA. In that same year (2018), Civil Aviation Group (a joint venture between Moldovan investors and Blue Air) won the privatization process of Moldova's airline, Air Moldova, for the sum of 50 millions MDL (2.56 million EUR). Civil Aviation Group took over Air Moldova's debts, worth 1.2 billion Moldovan lei (61 million euro).

On 6 July 2020, Blue Air filed for bankruptcy protection after a steep decrease in revenue which was only partially balanced by a 65 Million Euro loan received as state aid from the Romanian government.

In November 2020, the airline announced the retirement of their Boeing 737-300s and -500s and replace them with additional leased Boeing 737-800 aircraft.

==== Suspension of operations ====
On 6 September 2022, it was announced that Blue Air was forced to suspend all operations for at least six days, following the seizure of the airline's accounts by the Romanian authorities. Prior to this event there had already been arguments between the airline and the state after a high-ranking official advised against buying tickets from the airline.

On 7 September, the assets were released by the government, with Blue Air planning to resume reduced operations with just five aircraft in the near future. However, shortly afterwards, Blue Air announced the suspension of all flights until at least 10 October 2022, as the airline was currently not able to afford fuel and other services. On 30 September 2022, the airline removed its entire route network from sale. Shortly afterwards, all five of the airline's Boeing 737 MAX 8 aircraft were reallocated to LOT Polish Airlines by their lessor. As of October 2022, Blue Air did not plan to resume operations earlier than late 2022.

In November 2022, it was announced that Blue Air would be nationalized, with the Romanian state taking over 75 percent of shares, as the currently dormant airline was unable to pay back a state loan. During the same time, the airline's operational license was suspended, but not revoked.

In December 2022, Blue Air was indeed nationalized, with the Romanian state contemplating an onward sale of its confiscated 75 percent share to an investor. Shortly after, it was reported that the dormant airline had accumulated up to €250 million in debt.

On 21 March 2023, Blue Air filed for insolvency.

== Business trends ==
	2005	2006	2007	2008	2009	2010	2011	2012	2013	2014	2015	2016	2017	2018	2019	2020	2021
Turnover (€m)	24	50	95	124	140	150	149	137	135	148	199	291	412	495	458	108	
Net profit (€m)	-	-	-	-	-	-	-	-	-	−0.3	5.9	−26	−32	−31	15	−81	
Number of passengers (m)	-	-	-	1.1	1.72	1.5	1.5	1.5	1.37	1.6	2.05	3.6	5.1	5.2	4.2	1.6	
Number of aircraft (at year end)	3	4	5	6	10	8	8	8	8	11	15	24	29	25	23	14	
Number of employees	-	-	-	-	-	-	-	-	437	504	585	921	1,240	1,121	1,145	806	1,058
Notes/sources																	

== Operations ==
=== Bases ===
Blue Air used Bucharest as its primary hub for most of its history. Initially, the airline's hub was located at the Aurel Vlaicu International Airport (Băneasa), until the airport became overcrowded and was increasingly surrounded by urban development. This fact led to the airport's closure for commercial airlines in 2012; the airport was not closed officially, but the operating taxes for airlines were suddenly increased until no airline could afford them. As a result, all airlines moved their operations to Bucharest's largest airport, Henri Coandă International Airport. Blue Air then used this airport as its primary hub until its demise.

As of February 2022, the other bases of Blue Air were located in Romania and Italy:

- Bacău - Bacău International Airport
- Cluj - Cluj International Airport
- Turin - Turin Airport

Blue Air also used to have additional base operations at other Romanian and European airports. A base was maintained at Liverpool John Lennon Airport between 2017 and February 2019. They also had a base at Alghero–Fertilia Airport which was inaugurated in 2017 and closed in April 2019. The base at Mihail Kogălniceanu International Airport, which was maintained since April 2017 closed in 2019 as well. The base at Larnaca International Airport closed in September 2020, the one at Iași International Airport shut down in November 2020. However, prior to the shutdown of operations, Iași was planned to be reestablished as an operational base from 2023, inaugurating 14 routes.

=== Destinations ===
As of September 2022, prior to the suspension of operations, Blue Air offered flights to 75 scheduled destinations in 21 countries. The airline also operated ad-hoc and seasonal charters on behalf of other companies.

=== Codeshare agreements ===
Blue Air maintained codeshare agreements with the following airlines:

- Cyprus Airways

== Fleet ==
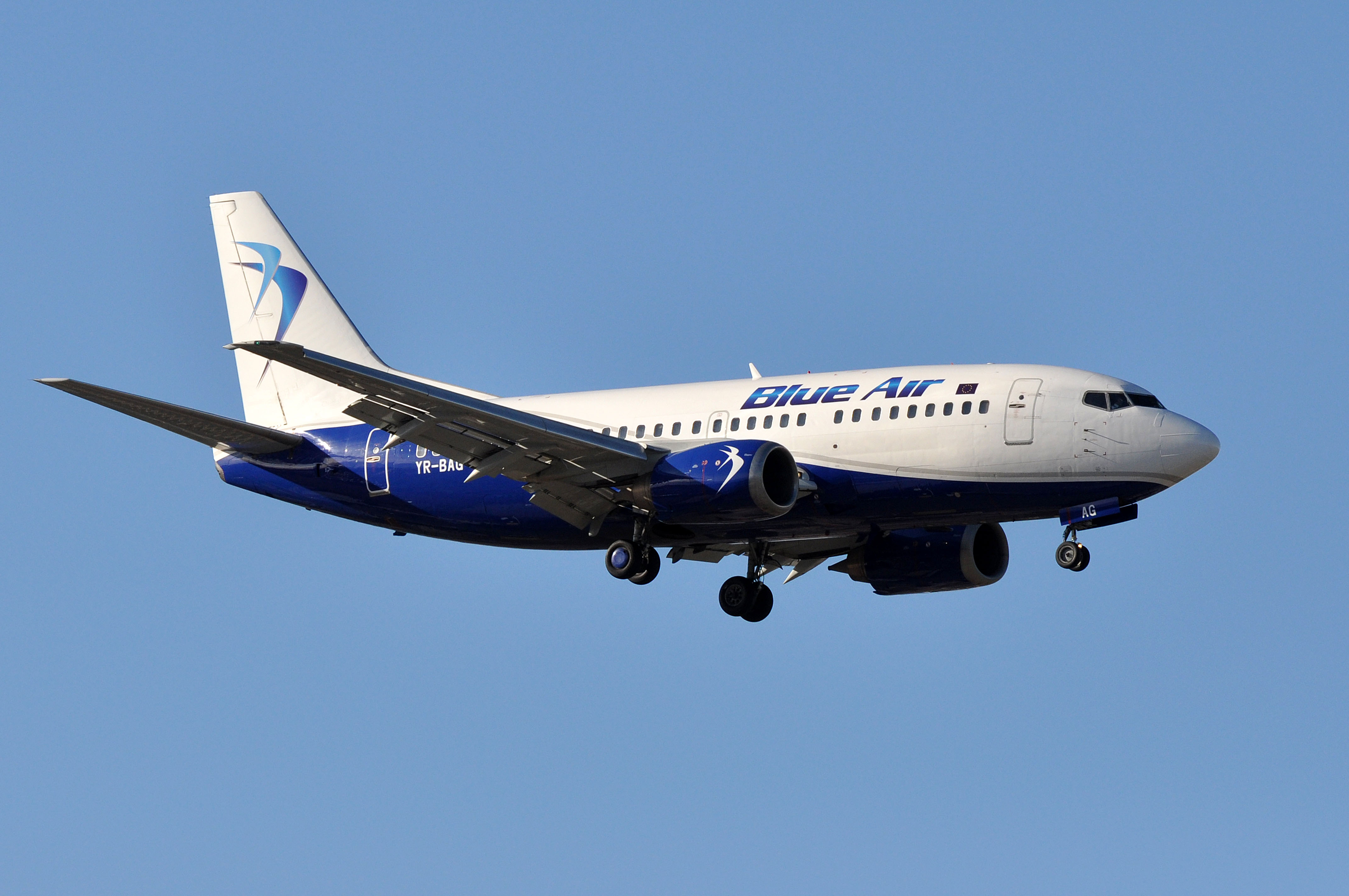
Blue Air Boeing 737-500

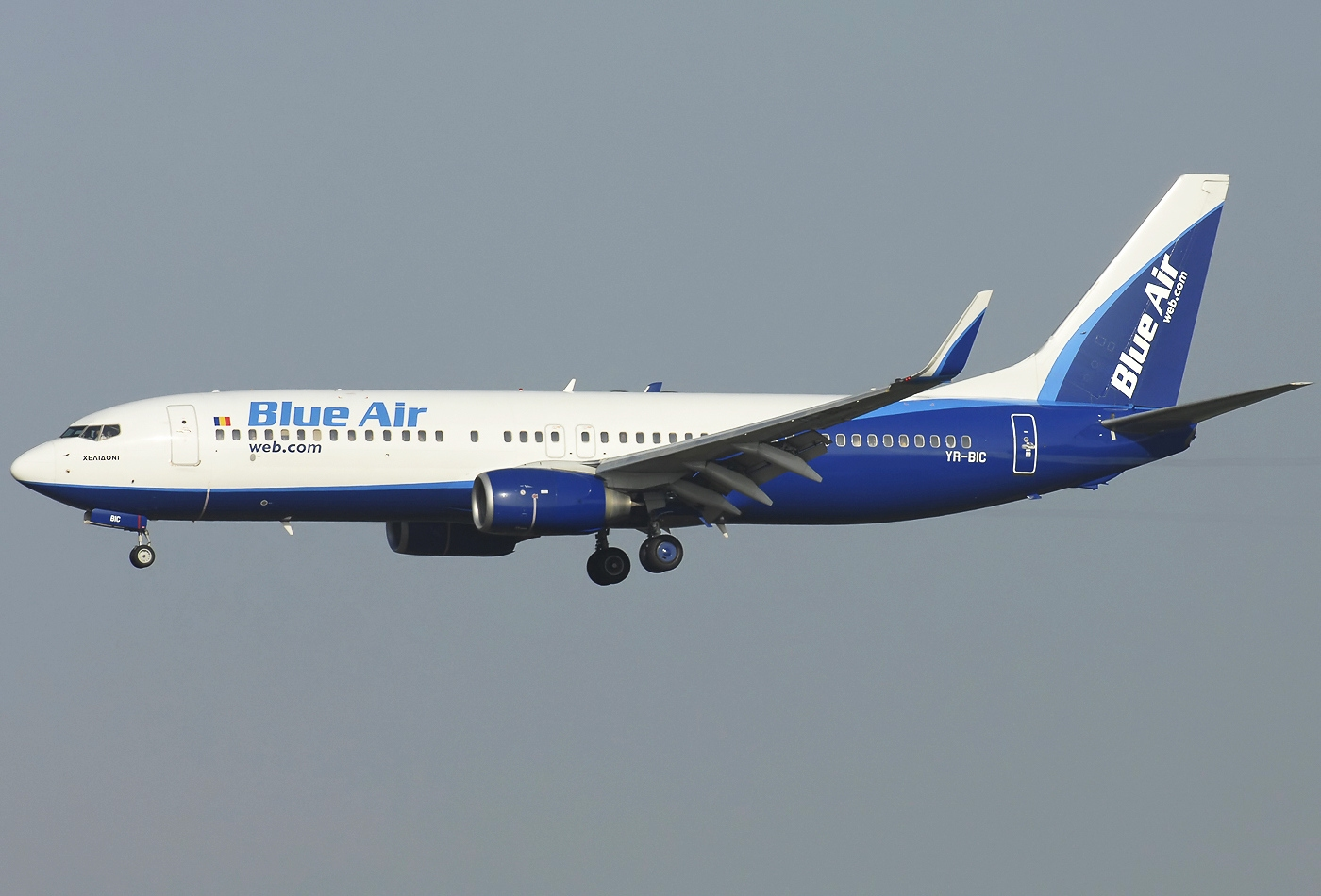
Blue Air Boeing 737-800 wearing an older livery version

=== Final fleet ===
As of January 2023, after significantly downsizing its numbers, the Blue Air fleet consisted of the following aircraft prior to ceasing operations:

Blue Air fleet
Aircraft	Number	Orders	Passengers	Notes
Boeing 737-500	2	—	120	Both currently stored.
Total	2	—		

=== Historical fleet ===
Since its first flight, Blue Air formerly also operated the following types of aircraft:

Aircraft	Introduced	Retired	Notes
Boeing 737-300	2004	2021	
Boeing 737-400	2006	2020	
Boeing 737-700	2015	2022	Removed from service after the suspension of operations.
Boeing 737-800	2008	2022	Removed from service after the suspension of operations.
Boeing 737 MAX 8	2021	2022	Returned to lessor after the suspension of operations.
Saab 340	2009	2013	Operated by Direct Aero Services.
Saab 2000	2009	2009	Leased from Carpatair.

== See also ==
- Aviation in Romania
- Transport in Romania
