= 2007 AerianTur-M Antonov An-26 crash =

Airplane incident involving an Antonov An-26 airliner

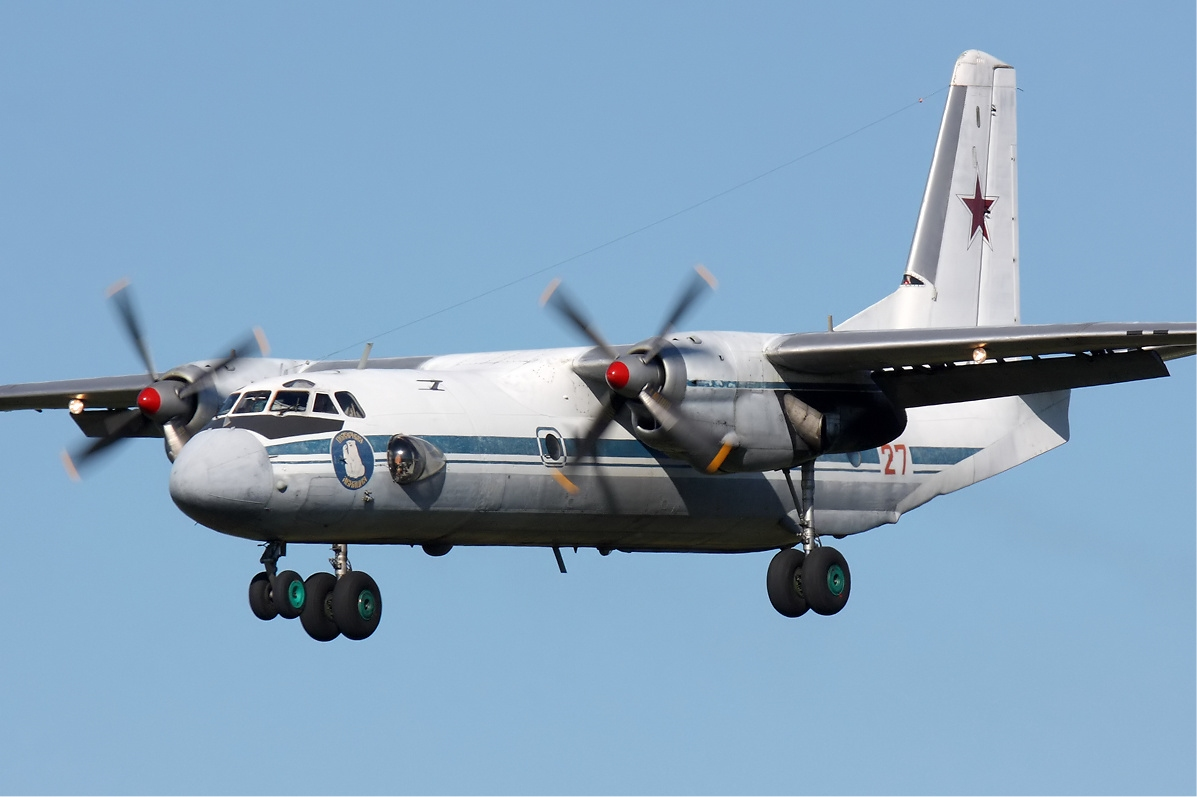
- An Antonov An-26 similar to the accident aircraft

Occurrence
- Date: 9 January 2007
- Summary: Controlled flight into terrain in low visibility due to fog
- Site: Balad, Iraq; 34°0′N 44°9′E

Aircraft
- Aircraft type: Antonov An-26
- Operator: AerianTur-M
- Registration: ER-26068
- Occupants: 35
- Passengers: 30
- Crew: 5
- Fatalities: 34
- Injuries: 1
- Survivors: 1

The 2007 AerianTur-M Antonov An-26 crash was an aviation accident involving an Antonov An-26 airliner, which crashed on 9 January 2007 while attempting to land at the Joint Base Balad in Balad, Iraq, which was at that time operated by the United States Air Force. The crash killed 34 people aboard and left one passenger critically injured. Officials claim the crash was caused by poor weather conditions, but other sources claim that this is a cover-up and the plane was actually shot down by a missile.

== Aircraft ==
The aircraft was an Antonov An-26B-100, registration number ER-26068. It made its first flight in 1981, and was powered by two Ivchenko AI-24VT engines. An-26s are a twin-engined light turboprop transport aircraft derived from the Antonov An-24, with particular attention made to potential military use. It has a modified rear fuselage with a large cargo ramp.

== Background ==
The aircraft, which took off from Adana, Turkey, at about 0400 UTC, was owned by the Moldovan company AerianTur-M, and on the day of the accident had been chartered to a Turkish construction company, Kulak, who had been contracted to build a new hangar at the air base. The aircraft hired by BSA Aviation Ltd (charterer) was carrying both cargo and passengers; a total of 1,289 kg (2,842 lb) of cargo was on board, compared with the 5,000 kg (11,000 lb) capacity. Turkish authorities told CNN Türk television that of the passengers, there were 29 Turkish workers, three Moldovans, a Russian, a Ukrainian, and an American on board, even though this totals one more than the number of people known to be on board. Later, the Russian consul general in Antalya said the Russian and the Ukrainian also had Moldovan citizenship.

== Crash ==
The plane crashed at 0700 UTC, about 2.5 km (1.6 mi; 1.3 nmi) away from Balad Air Base, the main hub of US military logistics in Iraq, while attempting to land. An anonymous ministry official told the Associated Press that the pilot had already aborted one landing attempt due to poor weather conditions. Although the aircraft was said to have crashed due to fog, one eyewitness, a relative of one of the deceased, said that he watched a missile strike the right hand side of the fuselage while standing just 300–400 meters (980–1,310 ft) from where the aircraft went down. The man also said that multiple other eyewitnesses also saw the aircraft get shot down. İsmail Kulak, a partner in the ownership of the Kulak Construction Company, was among the dead.

== Emergency response ==
Because the aircraft crashed in a military base, the emergency response was supplied by the U.S. Army and the U.S. Air Force. Ground ambulance response was by the 206th Area Support Medical Company, which is a US Army National Guard from Missouri. Eight ambulances responded with support from the base QRF. The QRF was the 1-134th LRS(D) from Nebraska. Helicopters from the Air Force's 64th Expeditionary Rescue Squadron transported the dead from the scene. Of the 35 passengers and crew members on board the flight, two individuals were pulled alive from the wreckage. One died after being transported by an Army ground ambulance to the Air Force Theater Hospital. The other survivor, a Turk named Abdülkadir Akyüz, was carried by an Army ground ambulance to the Air Force Theater Hospital, where he received life-saving emergency surgery.

== Reaction from the Islamic Army in Iraq ==
The day after the accident, the insurgent group Islamic Army in Iraq, using a web site known by authorities to be used by the group, claimed that they shot the plane down. The statement said that their members had "opened fire on a plane trying to land at an American base near Balad from different directions, using medium-range weapons... With the help of God, they were able to shoot it down."

== Investigation ==
After the wreckage was photographed in situ, the army hauled it away on flatbed trucks to the base, where it is presently secured. As well as the ongoing question of fog, Ahmed al-Mussawi, spokesman for the Iraqi transport ministry, said one day after the crash that "It must have been technical failure or a lack of aviation experience (on the part of the crew),". The crash is under investigation by the Iraqi government, American government and Moldovan government, but the Turkish government has been denied permission to join the investigative team. The Air Force and the Army say they are willing to help with the investigation. Ali Ariduru, deputy head of the Turkish aviation authority, said initial information indicated there was no technical malfunction on the plane. Eyewitness from the shift in one of the base towers did not see or hear missile or gunfire.

There is confusion as to the whereabouts of the aircraft's Flight Data Recorder and Cockpit Voice Recorder (FDR and CVR, commonly referred to as "black boxes"). The Turkish Foreign Ministry stated they have been shipped to Antonov's Kyiv headquarters, but Turkish Minister of Transportation Binali Yıldırım claims they are still in Iraq, with the rest of the debris. All that is confirmed is that they have been recovered, which occurred on 30 January.

== See also ==
- List of accidents and incidents involving commercial aircraft
- List of aviation accidents and incidents with a sole survivor
