= Moldaeroservice =

Moldovan airline and airport operator

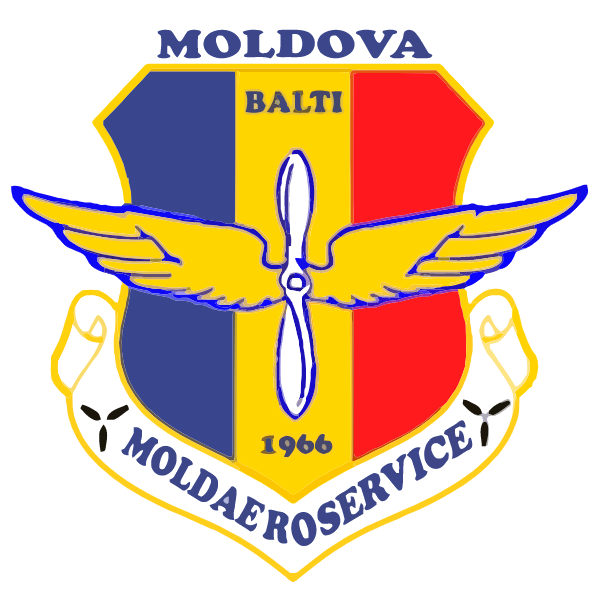
IATA	ICAO	Call sign
—	MLE	MOLDAERO
- Founded: 1996; 30 years ago as Moldaeroservice (name change from Moldaviaservice); September 17, 1994; 32 years ago as State Aviation Enterprise Moldaviaservice; 1966; 60 years ago as Bălți Flight Unit No. 281 of the Combined Aviation Unit of Bălți subordinated to the Civil Aviation Directorate of the Moldavian Soviet Socialist Republic
- Commenced operations: 1958; 68 years ago as the Civil Aviation Squadron of Bălți
- Operating bases: Bălți City Airport; Bălți International Airport
- Hubs: Bender aerodrome; Chișinău International Airport; Soroca aerodrome
- Fleet size: previously 208
- Destinations: internal Moldovan
- Parent company: Air Moldova, whose parent is Aeroflot
- Headquarters: Bălți, Moldova
- Revenue: ▲ L10,563,471 (2016)
- Operating income: ▼ L133,880 (2016)
- Net income: ▼ L85,512 (2016)
- Total assets: ▲ L40,652,303 (2016)
- Total equity: ▲ L26,685,086 (2016)
- Employees: previously 500
- Website: www.helicopter.md

Moldaeroservice is a major airline and airport operator of the Republic of Moldova headquartered in Bălți on the historic location of the Bălți City Airport at strada Aerodromului 12, next to the "Autogara" district. The company is legally organised as a state-owned enterprise (Romanian: Întreprinderea de Stat "Moldaeroservice", Russian: Молдаэросервис, abbreviation: Romanian: Î.S. Moldaeroservice) – state-owned enterprise.

== Background ==
Moldaeroservice founded in Bălți, became the most important aviation service provider in Moldova and one of the largest aviation enterprises in Moldova with about 500 employees. Founded in 1966, the company was reformed under its current name in 1996. Moldaeroservice provides airline services airline and airports' operator services, using its own aircraft and helicopters that perform flights in the airspace of Moldova and abroad. Moldaeroservice services also include air traffic services, operator of two airports in Bălți (Bălți City Airport and Bălți International Airport) and airline with subdivisions at Chișinău International Airport today and earlier at aerodromes of Bender and Soroca.

Moldaeroservice operates today out of its main bases at Bălți City Airport and Bălți International Airport and out of Chișinău International Airport, with previous operated hubs at aerodromes of Bender and Soroca.

During more than 45 years since its foundation, Moldaeroservice has become one of the most experienced providers of aviation services with Mi-2 and An-2 helicopters worldwide. Secondary offices in (current) Chisinau and (historical) Bender.

The current founding owner of Moldaeroservice is the Public Property Agency (Romanian: Agenția Proprietății Publice), which exercises its management rights through the administration board and the administrator.

== History ==
In 1958, the Civil Aviation Squadron of Bălți (Бельцкая АЭ – Авиационная Эскадрилья) was formed in addition to the Moldaivan Special Aviation Group of the Civil Air Fleet (Молдавская ОАГ ГВФ – Особая Авиационная Группа Гражданского Воздушного Флота)

Since 27 July 1964 the Civil Aviation Squadron of Bălți has been subordinated to the Moldovan Special Aviation Group of Civil Aviation (Молдавская ОАГ ГАА – Особая Авиационная Группа Гражданской Авиациии).

Between July 1965 and 1966 the Combined Civil Aviation Squadron of Bălți (Бельцкая ОАЭ – Объединённая Авиаэскадрилья) was subordinated to the Combined Aviation Unit of Chișinău (Кишинёвский ОАО – Объединённый Авиационнный Отряд).

From 1966 to September 1969 the Bălți Flight Unit No. 281 (281-й ЛО (Бельцы) – Лётный Отряд) was subordinated to the Civil Aviation Directorate of the Moldavian Soviet Socialist Republic (Молдавское УГА – Управление Гражданской Авиациии).

Between September 1969 and February 1978, the Combined Aviation Unit of Bălți (Russian: Бельцкий ОАОАО – Объединённый Авиационнный Отряд) was subordinated to the Civil Aviation Directorate of the Moldavian Soviet Socialist Republic.

From February 1978 until 1 January 1983 the Combined Aviation Unit of Bălți was subordinated to the Republican Production Unit of the Moldovan Civil Aviation (Молдавское РПО ГА – Республиканское Объединение Гражданской Авиациии).

Since 1 January 1983, the Combined Aviation Unit of Bălți has been subordinated to the Directorate of Civil Aviation of the Moldavian Soviet Socialist Republic.

The state enterprise "Moldaeroservice", was founded in 1966 as the Bălți Flight Unit No. 281 (Бельцкий авиаотряд №281) of the Combined Aviation Unit of Bălți by order of the Minister of Civil Aviation of the USSR, based on the civil aviation squadron of Yakovelev Yak-12 and Antonov An-2 aircraft. Together with the Bălţi-City Airport Services, the Bălți Aviation Unit No. 281 formed the Combined Aviation Unit of Bălți.

The commander of Bălți Flight Unit No. 281 was appointed Nicolae Zavadschii, the head of the airport – Petru Ovcinicov, the head of the airport technical service base – Victor Șerstiuc and the head of the Combined Aviation Unit of Bălți – Vitalie Bezdenejnîh. Among the commanders of the Combined Aviation Unit of Bălți were: Alexei Lyciman, Yevgeny Ilyakov, Anatolii Bajucov, Alexei Alexeev, Vasilii Burma, Ivan Tomac, Vladimir Rishkov, Valery Cenin. Among the heads of the airport's technical services base were Grigore Rotari, Boris Cabac, Victor Gherta. The air navigation service was headed by Dmitrie Covalciuc, and the passenger service by Maria Ribacova, Alexandr Ojegov, Leonid Solovyov. The airport and ground service was headed by Petru Lobanov, Rașid Biriucov, Dmitrie Gubarev, Vasile Barabaș. Throughout its development, the company went through many stages of restructuring and advancement. In 1989 the concrete runway was put into operation at the newly built Bălți-Leadoveni International Airport (also managed by Moldaeroservice), thanks to which the passengers from the northern region of the Republic of Moldova gained the possibility of air travel to 14 cities of the former USSR with aircraft of the type Antonov An-24, Tupolev Tu-134, Let L-410 Turbolet until 1993.

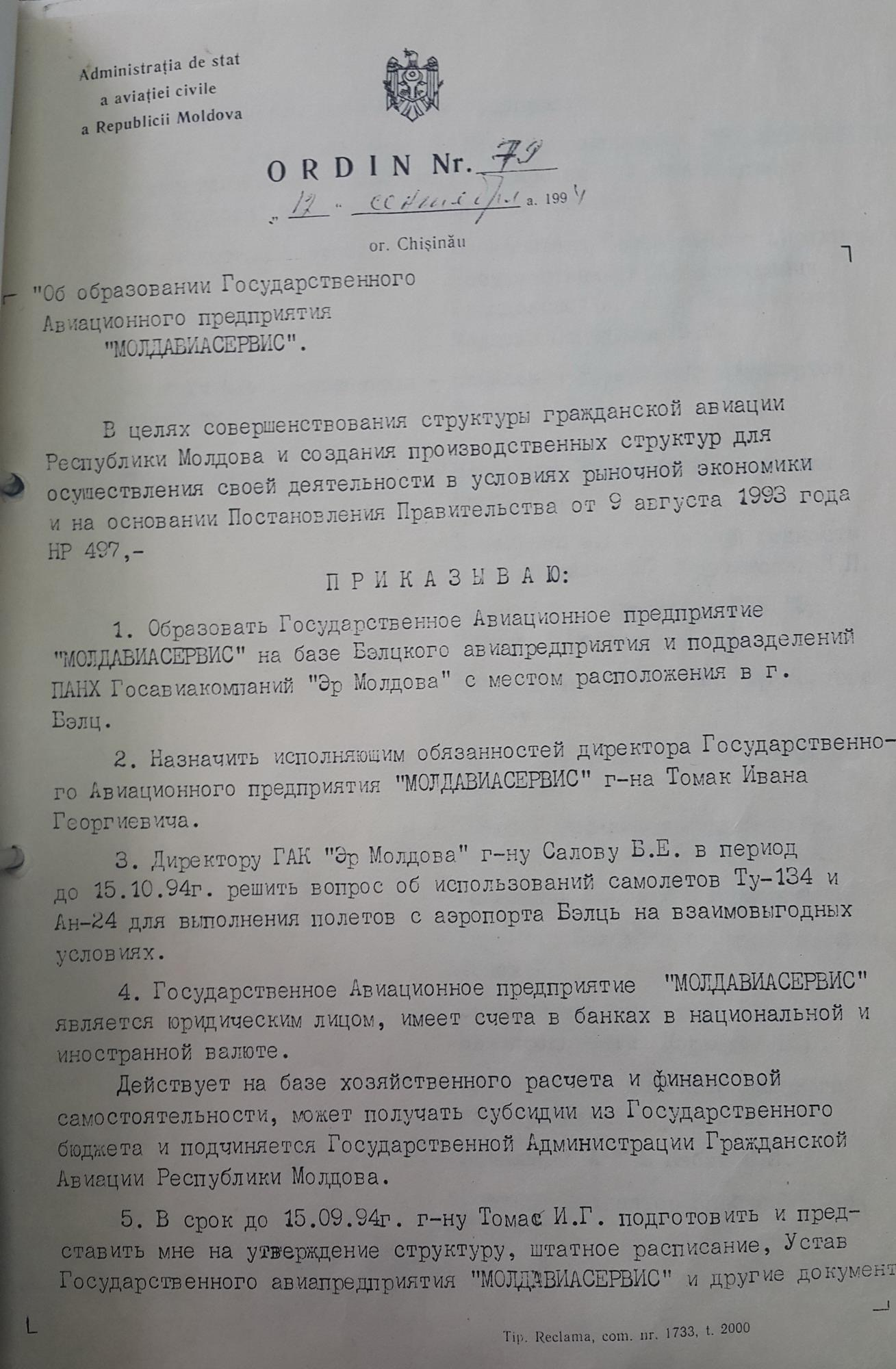
Order No. 79 of 17 September 1994 on the establishment of the state enterprise Moldaeroservice in Bălți on the basis of the Bălți Aviation Company and Air Moldova.

With the dissolution of the Soviet Union, the airspace control and surveillance service became an independent service, delegated to the Bălți branch of the state enterprise "MOLDATSA".

The Combined Aviation Unit of Bălți, which became the Bălți Aviation Company, was reorganised and renamed "Moldaeroservice" in 1994. Thus, the company became a self-sufficient company as "Moldaeroservice" with its own balance sheet, having under its management: Bălți-Leadoveni International Airport (145 ha), Bălți-City Airport (136 ha), professional staff, buildings and premises necessary for the technological and production process, Antonov An-2 aircraft and Mil Mi-2 helicopters. In accordance with the air operator's permit No. Md 001, issued by the Civil Aviation Authority of the Republic of Moldova, the company performs the following operations: air ambulance flights, observation flights, flights for search and rescue operations, advertising and leisure flights, flights for the benefit of the agricultural and forestry sector.

According to certificate MD.145.0025, Moldaeroservice is approved as a maintenance organisation for Antonov An-2 (ASH-62IR); Mil Mi-2 (GTD-350); C3; C5; C6; C7; C8; C9; C12; C13; C14; C18.9.

== See also ==
- Aviation in Moldova
- Transport in Moldova
