= Fly Pro =

Moldovan airline

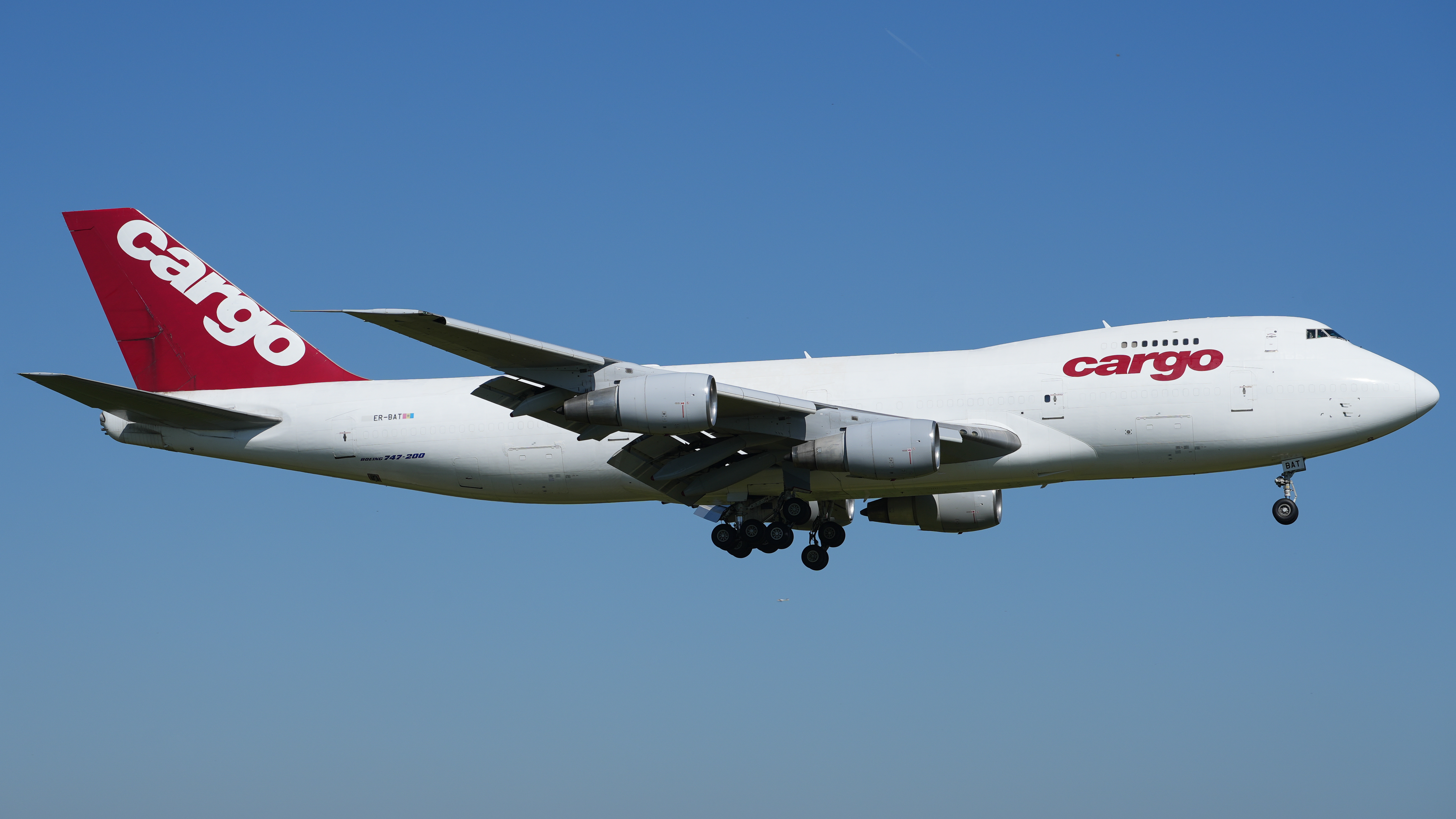
- A Fly Pro Boeing 747-200F
IATA	ICAO	Call sign
FP	PVV	SUNDAY
- Founded: 2016
- Commenced operations: 30 November 2016
- AOC #: MD 023
- Hubs: Chișinău International Airport
- Fleet size: 4
- Headquarters: Chișinău, Moldova
- Key people: Roman Gilmanov (Accountable Manager)
- Website: https://gss.aero/

Fly Pro (legally CA "Fly Pro" SRL) is a Moldovan cargo charter airline established in November 2016 based at Chișinău International Airport.

== Destinations ==
Fly Pro operates chartered cargo services on various routes throughout the Middle East and Asia.

== Fleet ==
As of August 2025, Fly Pro operates the following aircraft:

Fly Pro fleet
Aircraft	In service	Orders	Notes
Airbus A300-600F	1	—	
Boeing 747-200F	3	—	
Total	4	—	

This aircraft is capable of carrying up to 112 tonnes of freight.

== See also ==
- List of airlines of Moldova
