= Terra Avia =

Moldovan airline

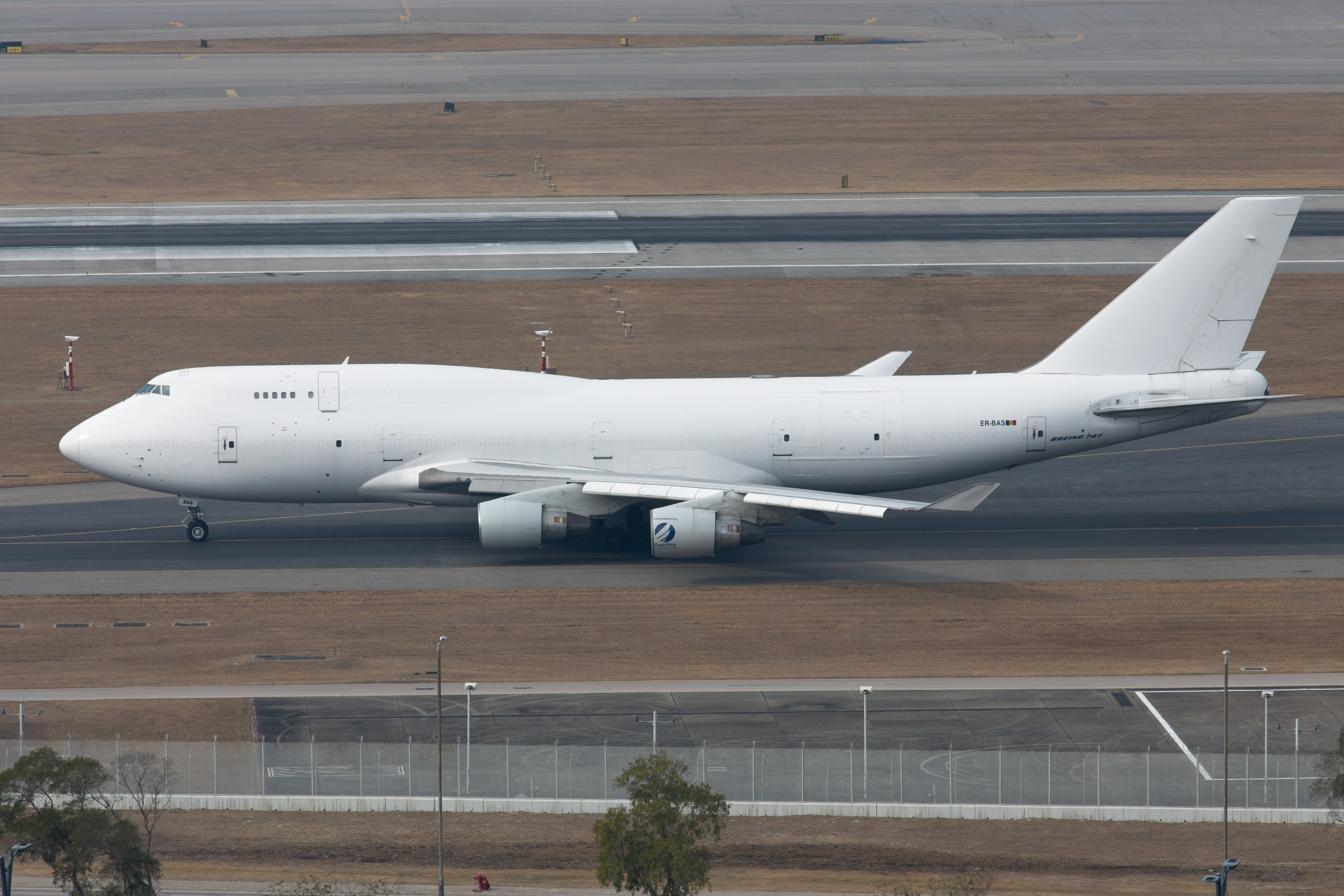
- Terra Avia Boeing 747-400BDSF
IATA	ICAO	Call sign
T8	TVR	TERRAAVIA
- Founded: 2005
- Hubs: Chișinău International Airport
- Fleet size: 8
- Headquarters: Chișinău, Moldova
- Website: terraavia.com

Terra Avia is a charter airline based at Chișinău International Airport in Chișinău, Moldova.

== History ==
In April 2019, the airline's AOC was temporarily suspended due to safety concerns, however it since resumed operations.

== Fleet ==
As of August 2025, Terra Avia operates the following aircraft:

Terra Avia fleet
Aircraft	In service	Orders	Notes
Boeing 737-300QC	1	–	Passenger/Cargo
Boeing 737-300SF	2	–	Cargo
Boeing 747-400	2	–	
Boeing 747-400BDSF	2	–	Cargo
Boeing 777-212ER	2	–	
Total	8	–	
