= Moldavian Airlines =

Moldovan airline (1994–2014)

IATA	ICAO	Call sign
2M	MDV	MOLDAVIAN
- Founded: 1994
- Ceased operations: 2014
- Operating bases: Chişinău International Airport
- Fleet size: 16
- Destinations: 19
- Parent company: Carpatair
- Headquarters: Chişinău, Moldova
- Website: mdv.md

Moldavian Airlines was an airline with its head office on the property of Chişinău International Airport in Chişinău in Moldova. It operated scheduled international services from Chişinău to destinations in Romania and Italy. Its main base was Chişinău International Airport.

== History ==
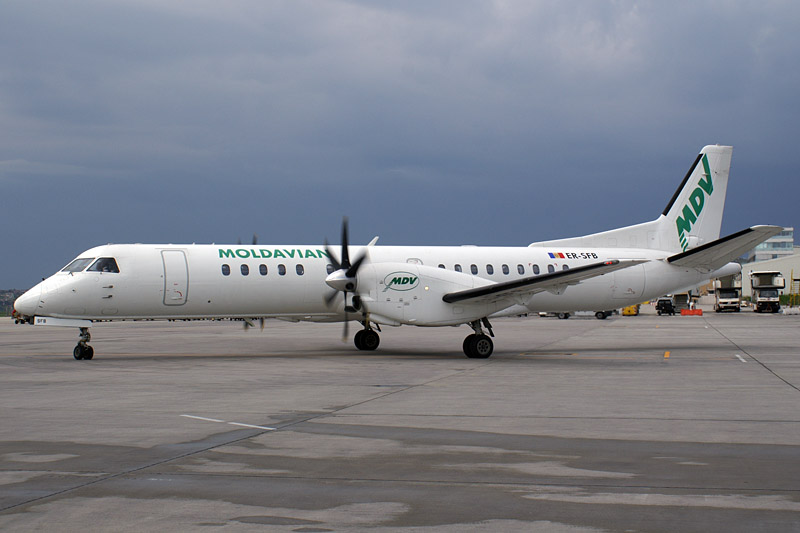
Moldavian Airlines Saab 2000

Moldavian Airlines was established on 26 July 1994 by József Veres and started operations on 19 August 1994. It was the first private airline in Moldova. It became a joint Swiss-Moldovan company in November 1999, forming a partnership with Carpatair, a regional airline based in Romania. The Moldavian Airlines air operator's certificate permitted the transport of passengers, goods and mail (at July 2007).

In 2005, Moldavian Airlines transported 91,200 passengers. In 2006, 89,200 passengers were transported. In 2007 50,000 passengers were transported to Budapest. In 2008 the passenger number declined to 45,700 passengers.

The airline shut down and ceased all operations in 2014.

== Destinations ==
Moldavian Airlines carried out flights for Carpatair, a Romanian airline based at Timișoara Traian Vuia International Airport.

== Fleet ==
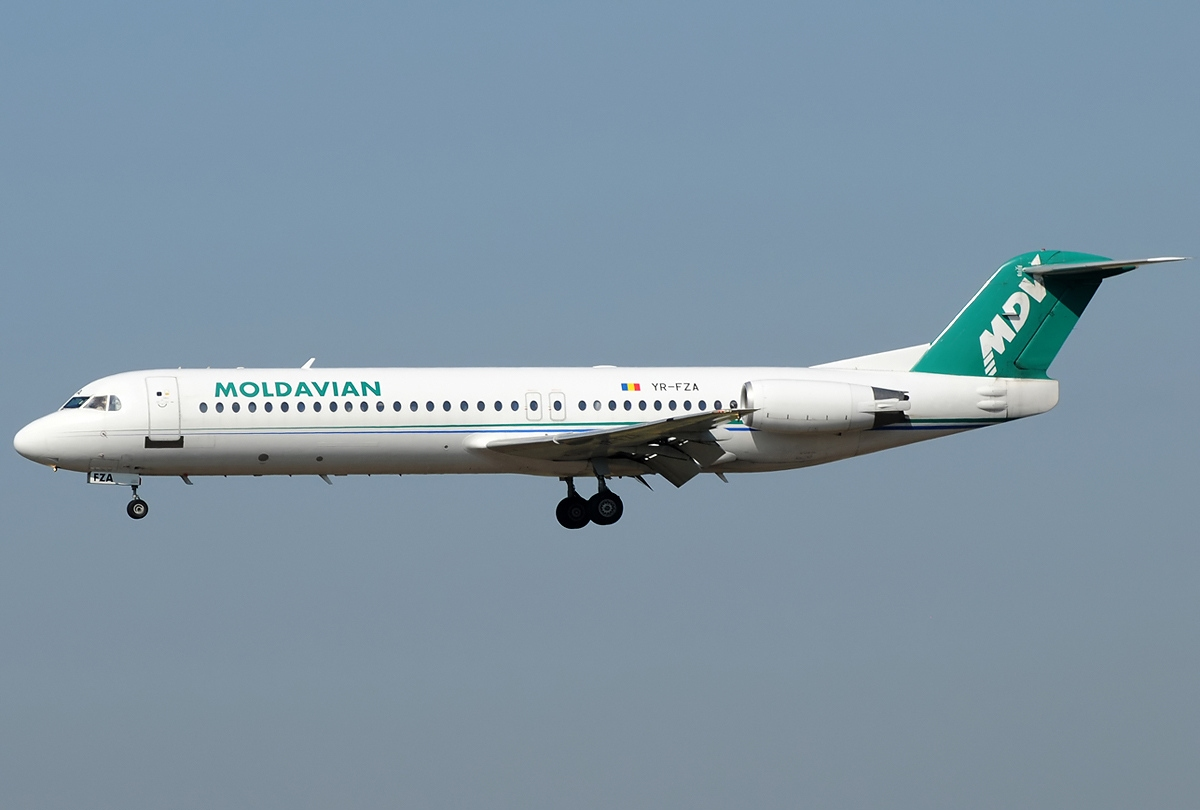
Moldavian Airlines Fokker 100

The Moldavian Airlines fleet consisted of the following aircraft:

Aircraft type	Now	Future	History	Notes
Boeing 737 Classic	--	--	2	--
Fokker 70	--	--	1	--
Cesna 208 Caravan	1	--	--	
Total	1	0	3	
