= Air Moldova =

National airline of Moldova

IATA	ICAO	Call sign
9U	MLD	AIR MOLDOVA
- Founded: 1 January 1993; 33 years ago
- Ceased operations: 3 May 2023; 3 years ago (operations suspended)
- Hubs: Chișinău International Airport
- Frequent-flyer program: Air Moldova Club
- Fleet size: 5
- Destinations: 19 (5 charter flights)
- Headquarters: Chișinău, Moldova
- Key people: Alexandru Ceban (General Director)
- Website: airmoldova.md

Air Moldova was the flag carrier airline for The Republic of Moldova, headquartered in the country's capital Chișinău. It mainly operated scheduled and charter services to destinations within Europe from its base at Chișinău International Airport. Air Moldova suspended all operations on 3 May 2023.

== History ==
=== The roots of Moldavian civil aviation ===
The origin of Air Moldova can be traced to 19 September 1944, when the first unit of Po-2 transport aircraft arrived in Chișinău and the Moldavian Independent Squadron was established. Aside from fifteen aircraft Po-2 biplanes operating domestic flights and serving in the agricultural role, there were also two Li-2 aircraft, used on flights to Moscow, some Ukrainian cities and to Black Sea and Caucasus summer resorts.

In the 1960s, considerable steps were made in the development of the local Moldavian airline industry. A new airport in Chișinău able to accommodate gas turbine aircraft was opened early in the decade. The enterprise received status of Ministry of Civil Aviation in 1965, and new Antonov An-10, An-12 and An-24 aircraft expanded its fleet. Regular flights to many cities in the USSR were begun, and the transportation of fruits and vegetables grown in Moldova to the largest industrial centers of the USSR was established.

The beginning of the 1970s was marked by the appearance of jet aircraft on Moldova's main air routes. The first Tupolev Tu-134 twin-jet airliner began service in Moldova in 1971 and became the main aircraft type of the enterprise, increasing in number until at one point 26 of them were in use. In Chișinău there was even an all-union test basis for aircraft of this type.

The fleet was further enlarged in 1972 with the Yakovlev Yak-42 tri-jet regional aircraft and in 1974 with the An-26 turboprop cargo aircraft. The route map kept expanding and the flow of traffic kept growing throughout the decade. In the middle of the 1980s, Moldavian operations received ten larger Tupolev Tu-154 tri-jet airliners, furthering the development of Moldavian aviation. At that time Moldavian aircraft flew to 73 cities in the USSR and carried over 1,000,000 passengers per year. In 1990, the first international route between Chișinău and Frankfurt was opened.

=== Creation of Air Moldova ===
The airline was created in 1993 on the basis of the local Aeroflot unit. Since the very start, the company's efforts were targeted at integration to the international market and compliance with the modern standards and requirements to high-end airlines. Air Moldova joined the management team improvement program in 1999.

On 13 July 2004, Air Moldova became an International Air Transport Association member. Air Moldova had also passed the operation safety audit and received the IOSA operator certificate. In May 2006, Air Moldova implemented e-ticketing on all its flights. The Air Moldova air operators certificate permitted the transport of passengers, goods and mail as of July 2007.

In 2012, Air Moldova transported 506,000 passengers, which increased in 2013 to 527,000 passengers. Further expansion occurred in February 2015 as Air Moldova ceased three routes to Bucharest, Kyiv and Sochi, as the contract with Tandem Aero, which operated them on behalf of Air Moldova, was discontinued. All these factors lead to, Air Moldova transporting 1,000,000 passengers for the first time.

In October 2018, it was announced that the process of privatising Air Moldova had been completed successfully, with Civil Aviation Group (a joint venture between two Moldovan business men and the Romanian airline Blue Air) becoming its owner for the sum of 50 million MDL (2.56 million EUR). The new owners also bought the airline's debts of 1.2 billion MDL (61 million EUR).

==== Suspension of operations ====
Air Moldova stated it would suspend all flight operations between 21 and 25 April 2023, citing ongoing financial issues. This also caused a dispute with the Moldovan aviation authorities which had mandated the airline restructure measures as well as an involved bank.

On 2 May 2023, Air Moldova announced the suspension of all operations due to financial constrains, planning restructuring measures and filing for creditor protection.

On 29 May 2023, The director and deputy director of the airline were summoned to court for exceeding their duties. Air Moldova's A320 navigability certificate expired on 21 August 2023. Due to the expiration of Air Moldova's air operator certificate, the airline's service will remain suspended.

== Destinations ==
Air Moldova operated flights to several European, Asian, and Middle Eastern metropolitan destinations from its base at Chișinău International Airport, as well as additional seasonal and charter flights to Greece, Montenegro, Spain, and Turkey.

=== Codeshare agreements ===
At the time of suspension, codeshare agreements were in operation with Air Moldova with the following airlines:

- flydubai
- Turkish Airlines
- Ukraine International Airlines
- Utair

== Fleet ==
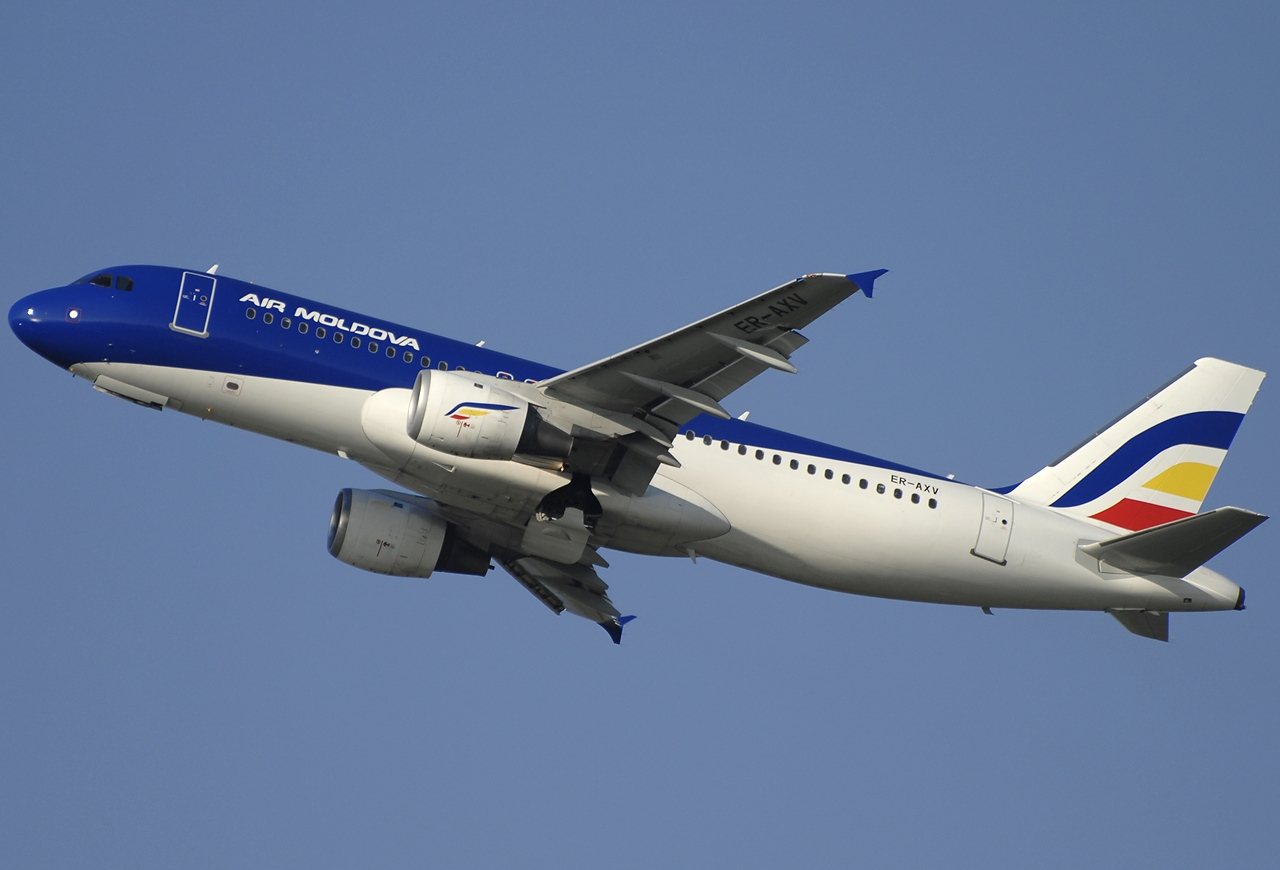
Air Moldova Airbus A320-200

=== Fleet ===
In May 2023, when operations were suspended, the fleet of Air Moldova consisted of the following aircraft:

Air Moldova fleet
Aircraft	In service	Passengers		
Aircraft	In service	J	Y	Total
Airbus A320-200	1	12	150	162
Airbus A321	2	0	220	220
Airbus A319	2	0	150	150
Total	5			

=== Former fleet ===
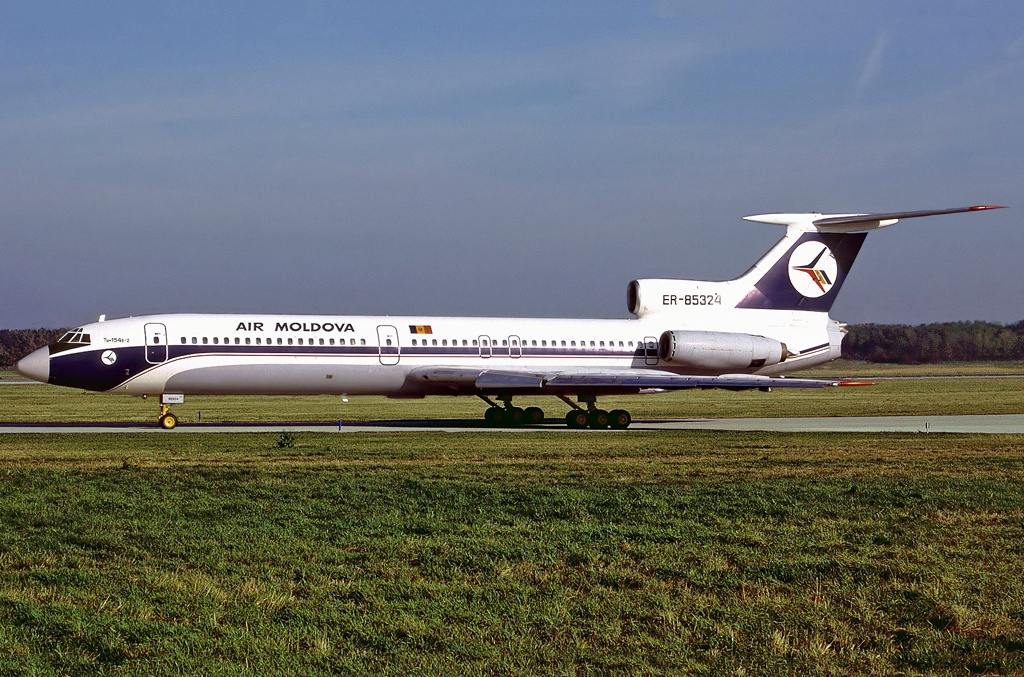
Air Moldova Tupolev Tu-154 (1996)

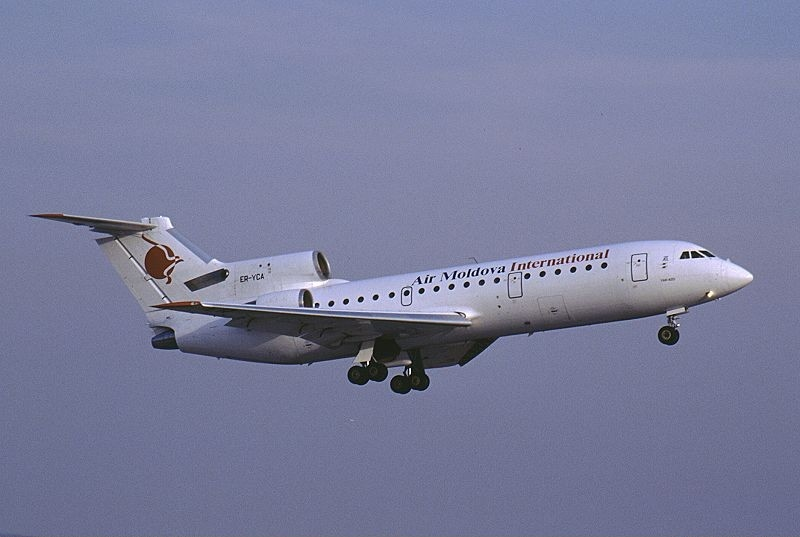
Air Moldova Yakovlev Yak-42 (2000)

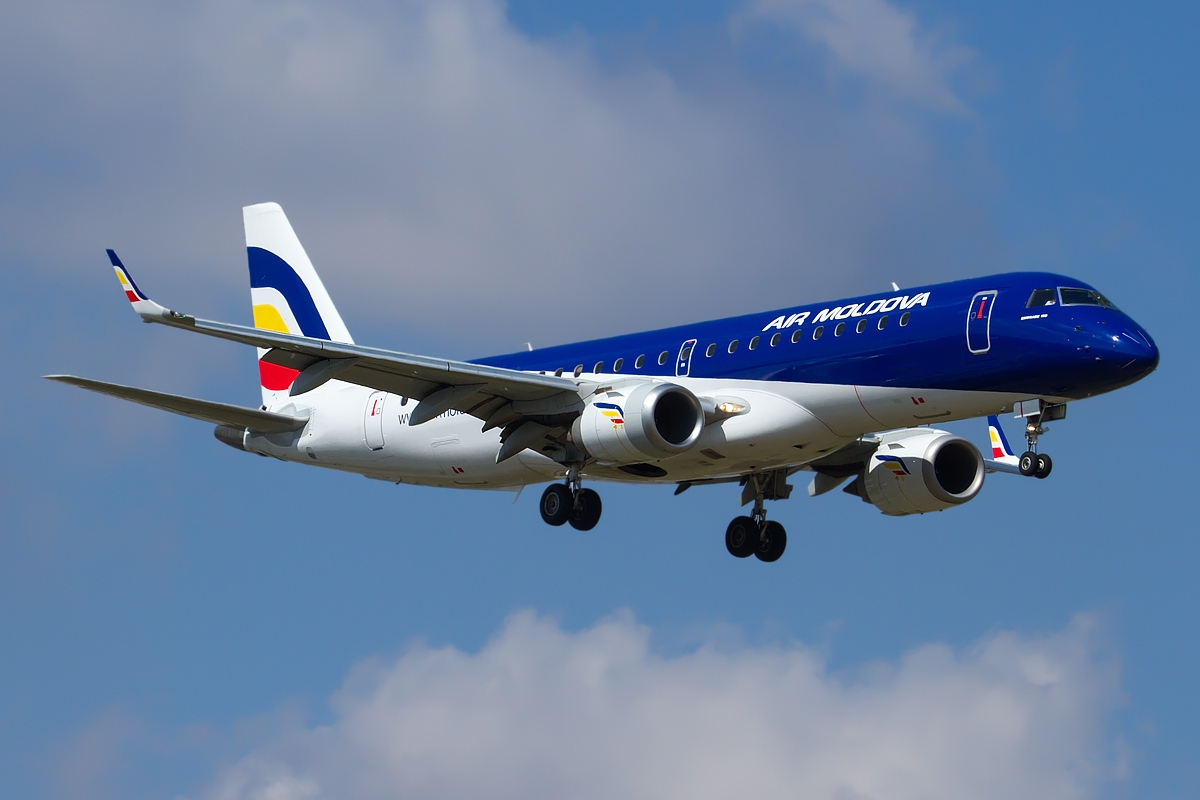
Air Moldova Embraer 190 (2013)

The Air Moldova fleet previously included the following aircraft types:

Aircraft	Total	Introduced	Retired	Notes
Embraer EMB-120	2	2004	2015	
Embraer ERJ-145	1	2001	2002	
Embraer 190	3	2012	2020	

=== Fleet development ===
The Tupolev Tu-134 operated the Moscow and Istanbul flights more often when the second Airbus left the fleet. In the past Air Moldova chartered a Cirrus Airlines Boeing 737-500, the Moldavian Airlines Fokker 100, a Bulgarian Air VIA A320, Jet Tran Air MD81/82s and a Khors Air MD82 as a replacement. The Yak-40 replaced the Embraer EMB-120 (e.g. to Prague or Vienna) when that aircraft was in maintenance. The two Yakovlev Yak-42s went back to Russia in late 2003 and 2004.

The first Embraer EMB 120 Brasilia was part of the fleet from 12 October 2001 until 28 September 2006 when it was transferred to Tandem Aero. The second Embraer EMB120RT flew between 23 April 2004 and 26 March 2005 for Air Moldova. The second Embraer EMB120 Brasilia was bought in 2006. In February 2015, Air Moldova phased out their remaining single Embraer EMB-120 which was operated on lease by Tandem Aero.

The last Tupolev Tu-154B (ER-85285) was destroyed on July 5, 2006.

In November 2006, 93.1 million Moldovan lei (about €6 million) were transferred from the 2006 state budget to Air Moldova. With another 9 million lei taken from a bank, one of the six Airbus A320 has been bought. The political opposition at that time had doubts about the transparency of this deal. In June 2007, Air Moldova gave back an Airbus A320 to the lessor after 38 months of service.

An McDonnell Douglas MD-82 (SX-BSQ) from SkyWings was leased for five months from 15 May until October 2007.

Embraer signed a firm order with Air Moldova for two single-class Embraer 190 regional jets. The contract included purchase rights for another aircraft. Delivery was on 10 May 2010. A third Embraer 190 (manufactured in 2009 and previously operated by Lufthansa and Borajet) joined the fleet in 2016. All have since left the fleet.

Air Moldova medium-term leased an Airbus A321, which previously operated for Small Planet Airlines in 2019. The Airbus A321 had been painted in the airline's livery and was delivered to Chișinău on 10 May 2019. It was the second Airbus A321 in the fleet, the previous one was phased-out in 2017.

== See also ==
- Aviation in Moldova
- Transport in Moldova
