= Aerotranscargo =

Moldovan airline

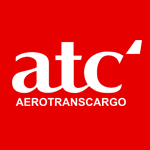
IATA	ICAO	Call sign
F5	ATG	MOLDCARGO
- Founded: 2012
- Hubs: Chișinău International Airport
- Fleet size: 6
- Headquarters: Moldova Chișinău International Airport
- Website: https://www.atc-md.aero/

Aerotranscargo is a Moldovan cargo airline based in Chișinău International Airport, Moldova.

== History ==
Established in 2012, it operates chartered cargo flights using a fleet of Boeing 747-400F freighters. In 2020, Aerotranscargo added two more 747-400F aircraft, expanding its fleet to six. In 2021, a seventh 747-400F was purchased from Thai Airways.

On 24 February 2021, it was reported that Aerotranscargo was to set up a subsidiary in the Netherlands, operating from Amsterdam Airport Schiphol with flights to China, Hong Kong and the United States. Branded as Aerotranscargo NL, the subsidiary was to initially lease 2 Boeing 747 freighters from the parent company, but aimed to add Boeing 747-8F and 777F aircraft in the long run, with a fleet of up to 10 aircraft. Aerotranscargo NL was due to start flying in the summer of 2021. However, in May 2021, plans to begin flights for Aerotranscargo NL were aborted, with the new subsidiary ceasing all operations.

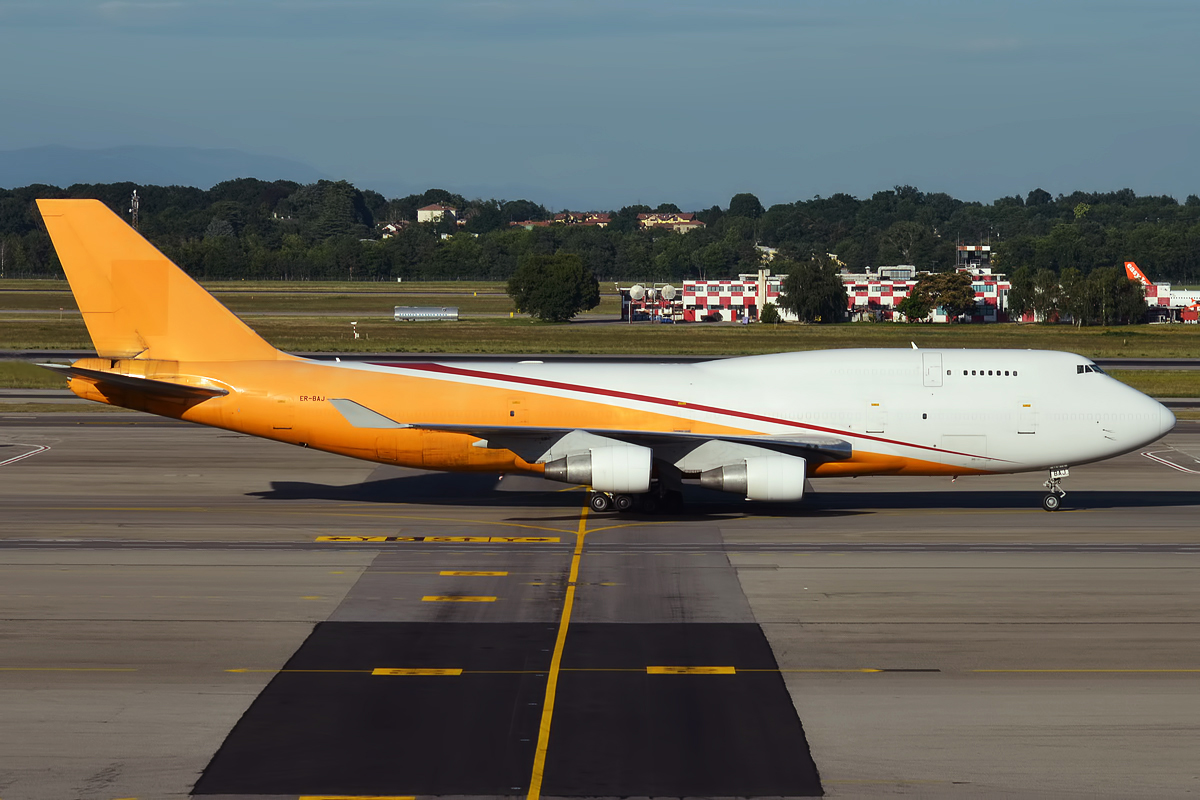
Aerotranscargo 747-412BDSF

== Destinations ==
As of September 2023, the airline operates to the following destinations:

Country	City	Airport	Notes	Refs
Australia	Brisbane	Brisbane Airport		
Australia	Melbourne	Melbourne Airport		
Azerbaijan	Baku	Heydar Aliyev International Airport		
Brazil	Rio de Janeiro	Rio de Janeiro/Galeão International Airport		
China	Zhengzhou	Zhengzhou Xinzheng International Airport		
Germany	Frankfurt	Frankfurt–Hahn Airport		
Germany	Munich	Munich Airport		
Hong Kong	Hong Kong	Hong Kong International Airport	Hub	
India	Delhi	Indira Gandhi International Airport	Focus city	
India	Mumbai	Chhatrapati Shivaji Maharaj International Airport		
Kazakhstan	Almaty	Almaty International Airport		
Kazakhstan	Astana	Nursultan Nazarbayev International Airport		
Malaysia	Kuala Lumpur	Kuala Lumpur International Airport		
Nigeria	Kano	Mallam Aminu Kano International Airport		
Saudi Arabia	Dammam	King Fahd International Airport		
Saudi Arabia	Jeddah	King Abdulaziz International Airport		
Saudi Arabia	Riyadh	King Khalid International Airport	Focus city	
Turkey	Istanbul	Istanbul Airport		
United Arab Emirates	Dubai	Al Maktoum International Airport	Hub	
United Arab Emirates	Fujairah	Fujairah International Airport		
United Arab Emirates	Sharjah	Sharjah International Airport	Focus city	
United Kingdom	London	Heathrow Airport		
Vietnam	Hanoi	Noi Bai International Airport		
Vietnam	Ho Chi Minh City	Tan Son Nhat International Airport		

== Fleet ==
As of August 2025, Aerotranscargo operates the following aircraft:

Aircraft	In service	Orders	Notes
Boeing 747-400BCF	2	—	
Boeing 747-400BDSF	3	—	
Boeing 747-400F	1	—	
Total	6	—	
