= Tepavia Trans =

Charter airline of Moldova

IATA	ICAO	Call sign
—	TET	—
- Founded: 18 May 1999
- Ceased operations: 2006
- Fleet size: 6
- Headquarters: Chişinău, Moldova
- Website: www.tepavia-trans.com

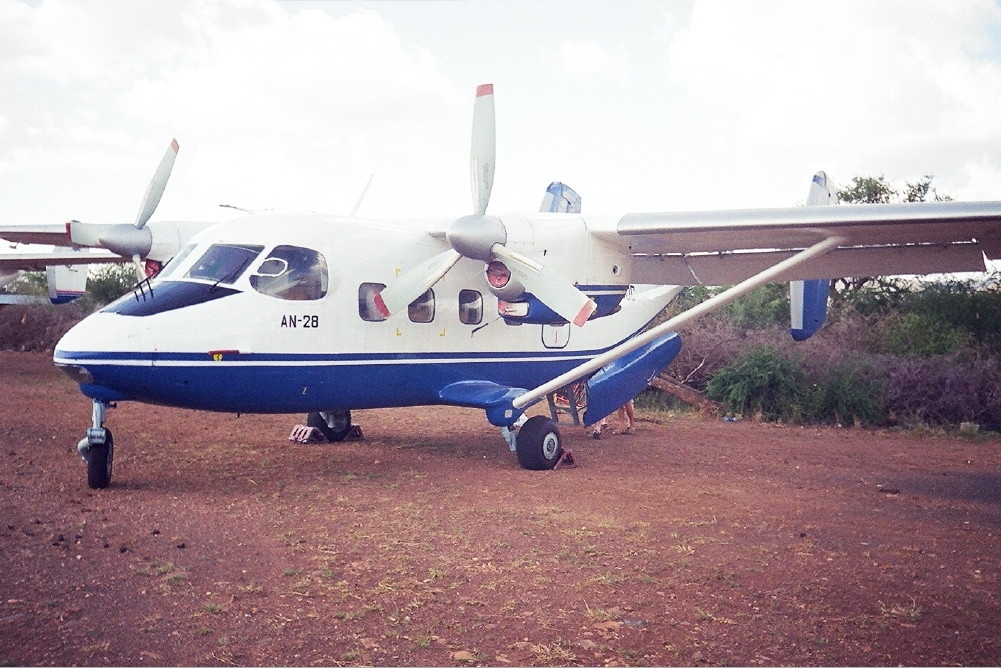
A Tepavia Trans Antonov An-28 at Lokichogio Airport, Kenya. (1999)

Tepavia Trans was a charter airline based in Chişinău, Moldova. It was founded on 18 May 1999 and operated cargo and passenger services as well as sub-charter and wet-lease operations. The airline was shut down in 2006.

== Fleet ==
As of August 2006 the Tepavia Trans fleet included the following aircraft:

- 2 Antonov An-12
- 4 Antonov An-28
