= Tandem Aero =

Charter airline of Moldova

Tandem-Aero
IATA	ICAO	Call sign
TQ	TDM	TANDEM AERO
- Founded: 1998
- Ceased operations: April 2019
- Hubs: Chişinău International Airport
- Destinations: 1
- Headquarters: Chişinău, Moldova
- Website: http://www.tandemaero.md/

Tandem Aero was a passenger charter airline based in Chişinău, Moldova, which existed from 1998 to 2019.

== Operations ==
The airline's air operator's certificate permitted the transport of passengers, goods and mail as of July 2007. Apart from passenger charter work, the airline at times operated contracted flights for Air Moldova to Sochi, Bucharest, and Kyiv. In February 2015, the arrangement with Air Moldova came to an end.

In the airline's final years, it attempted to pivot its business model into scheduled passenger operations. It purchased a second-hand Airbus A320, with which it flew a single scheduled route, once per week, between Moldova and Tel Aviv. However, before the airline could expand any further, its operator's certificate was revoked by the Moldovan Government in April 2019, citing safety concerns. This effectively brought the airline to an end.

== Fleet ==
By 2019, Tandem Aero's fleet consisted of the following:

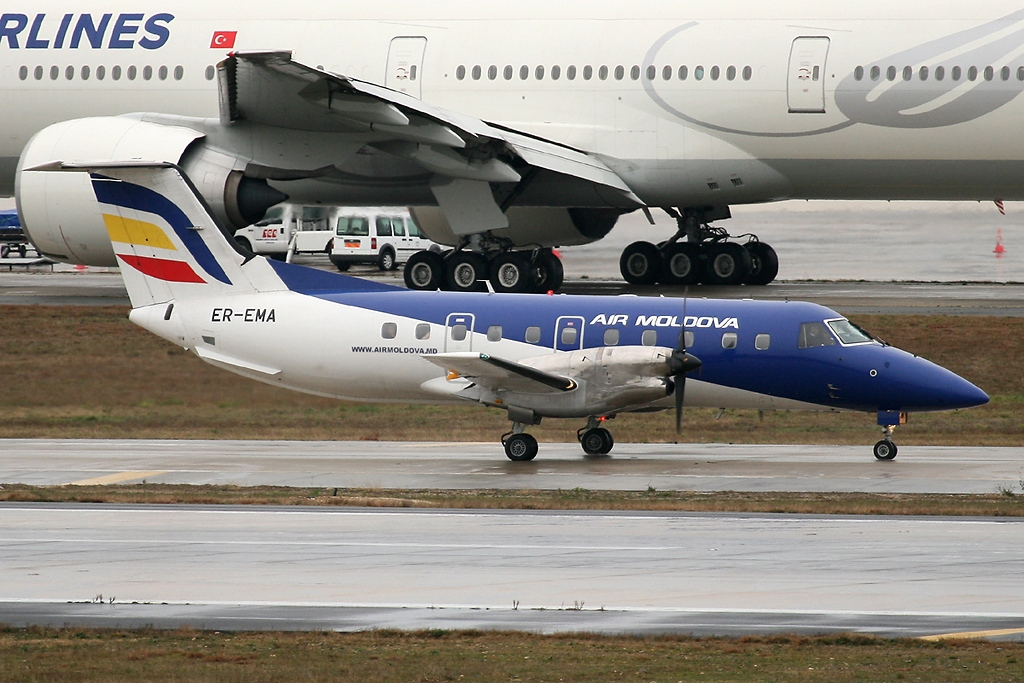
A picture of a Tandem Aero plane

Aircraft	In Fleet	Orders	Notes
Airbus A320	1	0	registration ER-AXN
Embraer EMB 120 Brasilia	1	0	registration ER-EMA, in storage

At some point, the airline also owned and operated Ilyushin Il-18 and Antonov An-24 aircraft.

== Destinations ==
By the closure of the airline in April 2019, Tandem Aero was operating the following route:

City	Country	IATA	ICAO	Airport	Refs
Chişinău	Moldova	KIV	LUKK	Chisinau International Airport ^{[Base]}	
Tel Aviv	Israel	TLV	LLBG	Ben Gurion International Airport	
