= Grixona =

Cargo charter airline of Moldova

IATA	ICAO	Call sign
—	GXA	—
- Commenced operations: 2005
- Ceased operations: 2007
- Headquarters: Chișinău, Moldova

Grixona was a cargo airline based in Chișinău, Moldova. It operated international charter services to destinations in the Republic of Congo, India, Iraq, Kyrgyzstan, Pakistan, Somalia and the United Arab Emirates. Its main base was Chișinău International Airport.

== History ==
The airline started operations on 29 April 2005 and had 125 employees (at March 2007).

In June 2007, the Republic of Moldova withdrew the airline's certificate on the grounds that the airline did not have appropriate safety oversight, and, as a consequence, the European Commission's Air Safety Commission banned the airline from flying within the European Union.

== Fleet ==
The Grixona fleet included the following aircraft (at March 2007):

- 1 Antonov An-12B
- 1 Ilyushin Il-18D
