= Carpatair =

Romanian airline

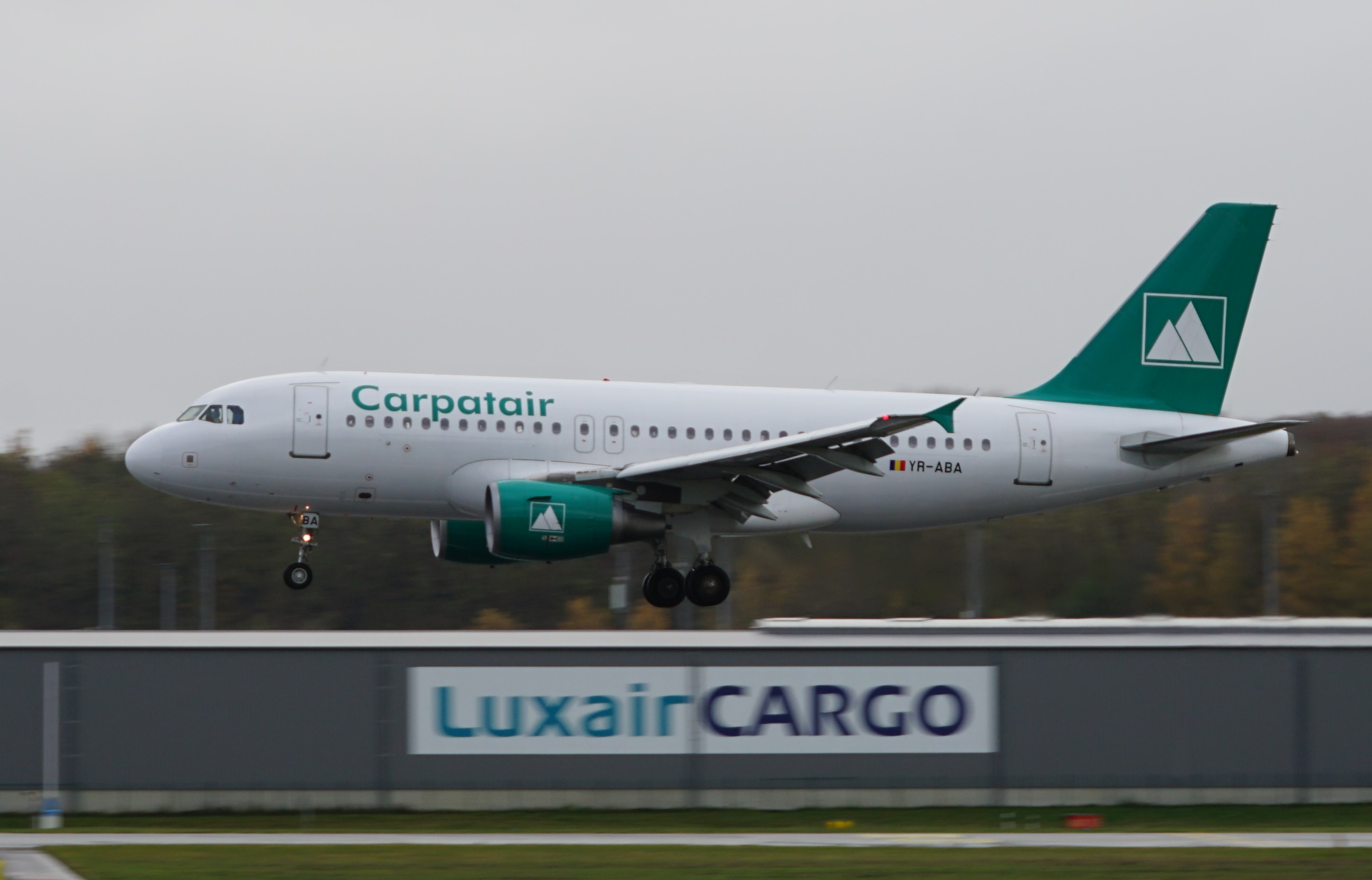
- Carpatair Airbus A319-100
IATA	ICAO	Call sign
V3	KRP	CARPATAIR
- Founded: 1999
- AOC #: RO-003
- Fleet size: 3
- Destinations: charter
- Headquarters: Timișoara, Romania
- Key people: Nicolae Petrov, President and CEO
- Revenue: ▲EUR 8 million (2012)
- Website: carpatair.com

Carpatair S.A. is a privately owned Romanian charter and former regional airline headquartered in Timișoara.

== History ==
Carpatair was established in 1999 and started operations in February 1999 in Cluj-Napoca. The present title was adopted in December 1999 when Swiss and Swedish investors took a 49% stake in the company. The airline is owned by Romanian shareholders (51%) and Swiss and Swedish shareholders (49%) The airline is an IATA member since 2006, and has recently successfully received its 5th IOSA (IATA Operational Safety Audit) registration. Carpatair employed 450 staff at March 2007. The current President and Chief Executive of Carpatair is Nicolae Petrov.

The carrier had filed for Insolvency on 23 January 2014. The statute used was Romanian Law 85/2006, which is very similar to the Chapter 11 status known in the USA, providing the company a special legal status.. Now the company has emerged from "reorganization" also, and continues to offer charter and ACMI solutions on a regular basis.

== Destinations ==
As of May 2014, Carpatair dissolved most of its route network; it no longer operates in Romania or Moldova. Carpatair operations now consists of ad-hoc and ACMI charters.

From December 2015, Carpatair operated for Adria Airways between Örebro in Sweden and Copenhagen in Denmark, and also under an NJ flight code route between Stockholm Arlanda Airport and Arvidsjaur/Gällivare in Sweden. From March 2016 until June of the same year, they flew under the Adria Airways call sign from Tallinn. During spring and summer 2016, one aircraft flew under contract for Volotea in France and Italy. From July 2016, they operated the route Stavanger - Oslo under contract for Norwegian Air Shuttle, and a number of routes from Brussels Airport on contract from Brussels Airlines. In summer 2016, Carpatair operated one aircraft on a wet-lease for LOT Polish Airlines on routes from Warsaw to Amsterdam and Gdańsk. Between April and May 2017, Carpatair operated services between Berlin-Tegel and Prague on behalf of now defunct Air Berlin. During the 2018 summer schedule, one aircraft was wet-leased to KLM to operate a couple of European routes from Amsterdam. Since 2023, Carpatair crews and aircraft have operated on airBaltic routes, especially during the busy summer season.

== Fleet ==
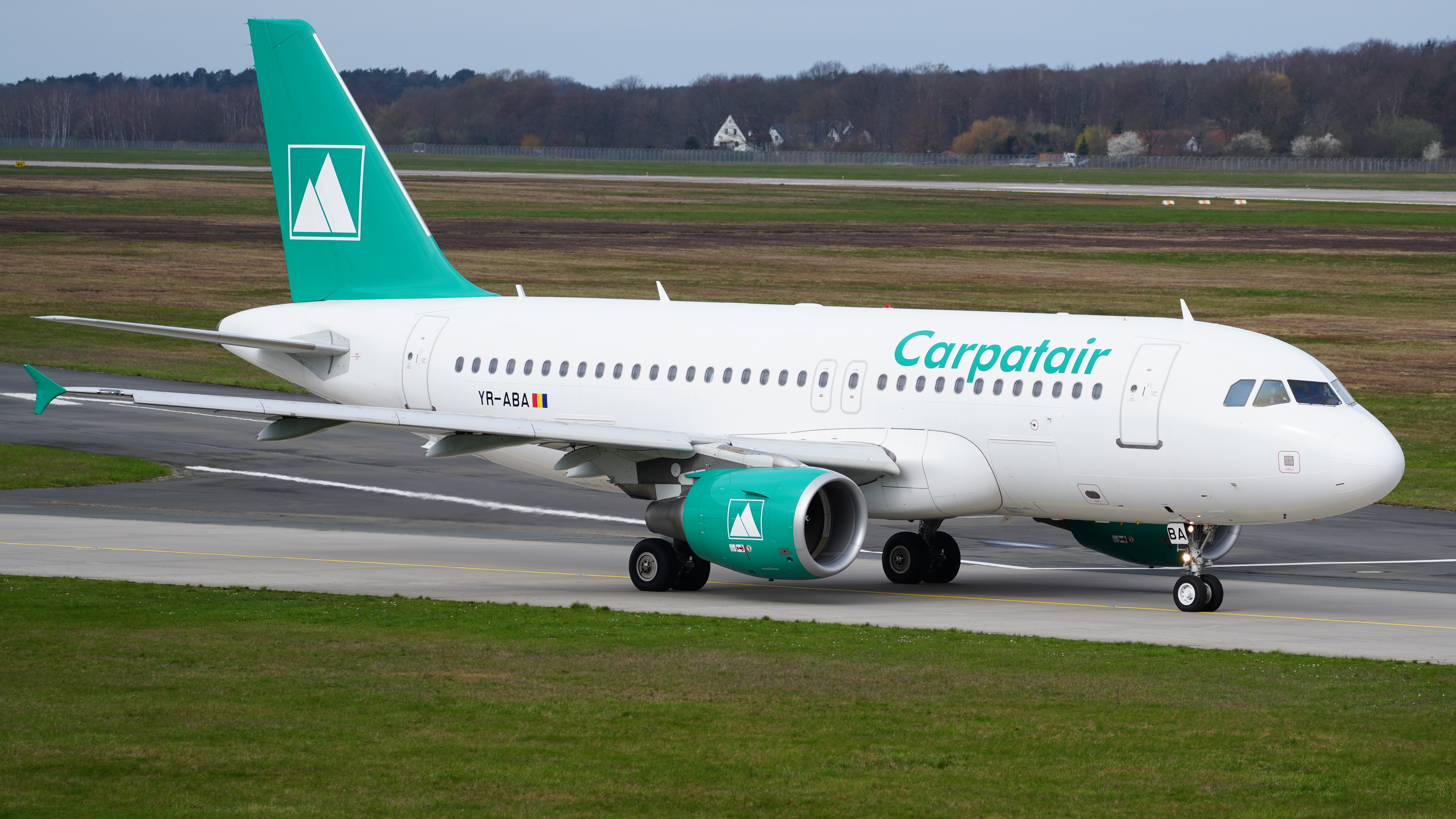
Carpatair Airbus A319-100

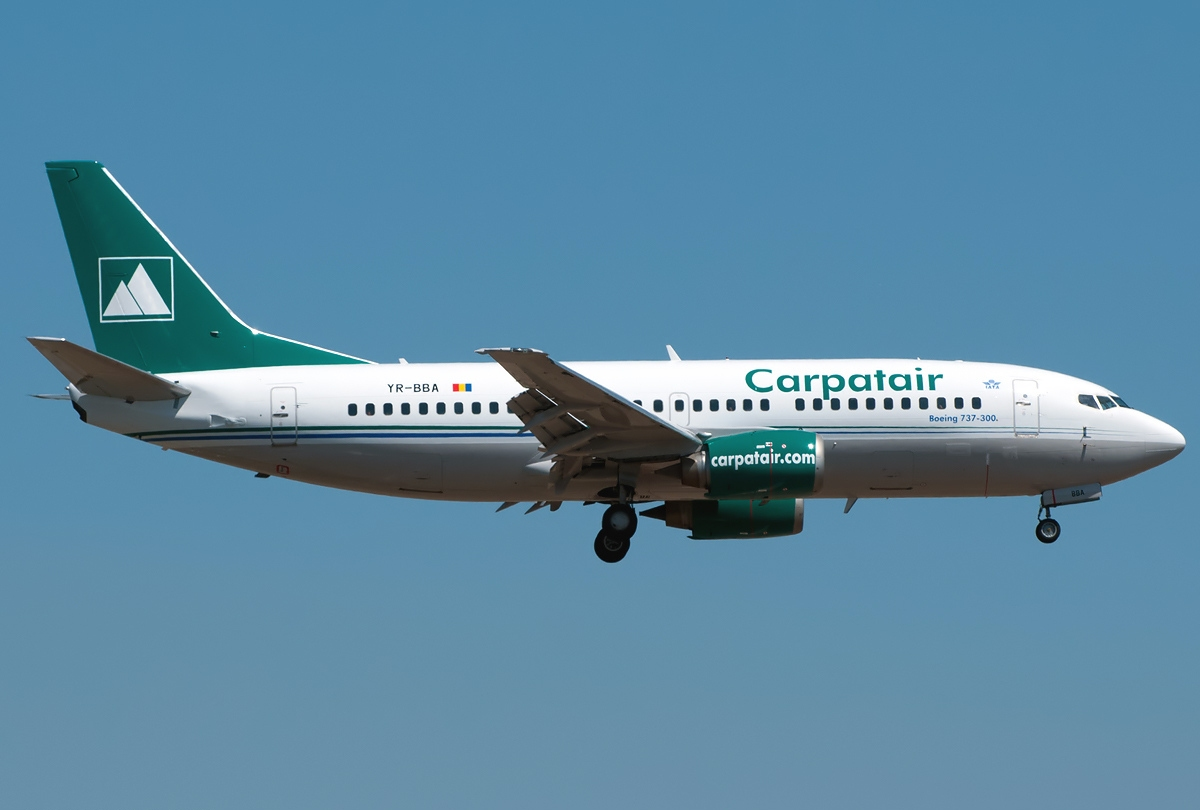
A former Carpatair Boeing 737-300 (2013)

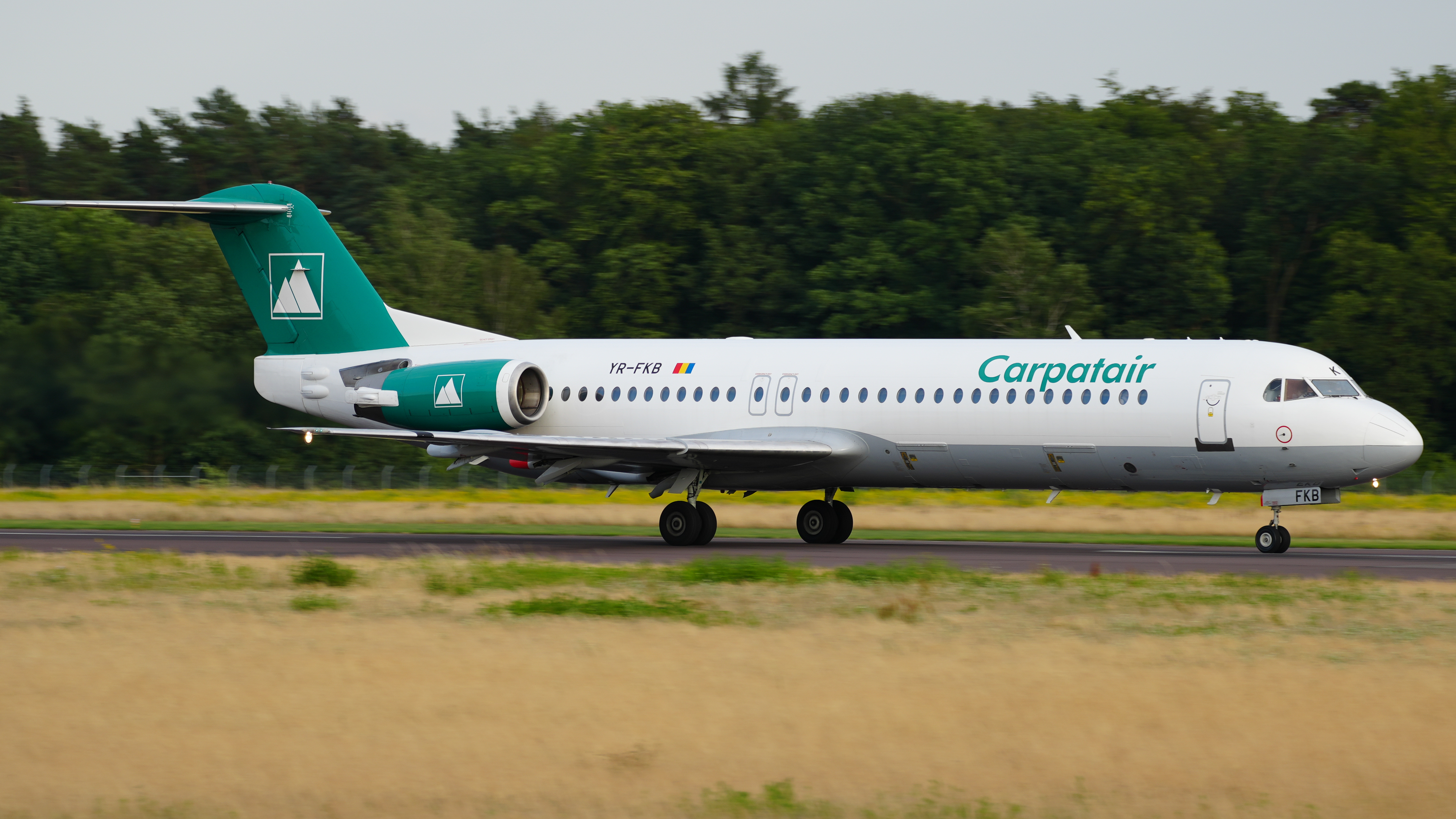
A former Carpatair Fokker 100

=== Current fleet ===
As of August 2025, Carpatair operates the following aircraft:

Aircraft	In fleet	Orders	Passengers	Notes
Airbus A319-100	2	—	156	
Airbus A320-200	1	—	180	
Total	3	—		

== Incidents and accidents ==
- On 2 February 2013, a Carpatair ATR 72–212A operating on behalf of Alitalia experienced a hard landing because of strong gusty wind at Leonardo da Vinci–Fiumicino Airport in Rome while arriving from Pisa. Sixteen people were injured, two seriously, one of whom was the co-pilot.
