= Nobil Air =

Airline of Moldova

IATA	ICAO	Call sign
-	NBL	NOBIL AIR
- Founded: 2003
- Ceased operations: 2015
- Hubs: Chişinău International Airport
- Headquarters: Chişinău, Moldova
- Website: http://www.nobil-air.com/

Nobil Air was an airline based in Chişinău, Moldova. It operated VIP charter services. Its main base was in Chişinău International Airport.

The Nobil Air air operators certificate permitted the transport of passengers (as at July 2007).

In 2015, the airline was rebranded as Classica Air.

== History ==
The airline was established in 2003. The airline's Learjet 35 was delivered in September 2004 and it began operating in November 2004. It was the first of its type to be delivered and operated in Moldova and it had been used to transport former Moldovan president Vladimir Voronin.

== Fleet ==
As of November 2011, the current Nobil Air fleet consists of a single Bombardier Learjet 60.
