= Aeronord =

Airline of Moldova

IATA	ICAO	Call sign
—	NRP	Aeronord
- Commenced operations: 2006
- Ceased operations: 2007
- Headquarters: Chisinau, Moldova

Aeronord was an airline based in Moldova, founded in 2006.
