= Aerocom =

Moldovian airline closed in 2004

IATA	ICAO	Call sign
—	MCC	—
- Founded: 1998
- Ceased operations: 2004
- Fleet size: 5

Aerocom was an airline based in Chişinău, Moldova. It was suspected to be involved in the illegal weapons trade, which ultimately led to the airline being shut down in 2004.

== History ==
Aerocom was founded in 1998 and operated chartered passenger and cargo services out of Chişinău International Airport.

In 2004 the United Kingdom Department for International Development was criticised for having hired Aerocom to fly humanitarian aid missions to Morocco following the earthquake there, because in a 2003 United Nations report Aerocom was accused of breaking international sanctions by having transporting huge quantities of arms to Liberia in 2002. Subsequently, special permission from the United Kingdom Civil Aviation Authority was needed to allow Aerocom's Moldova-registered Ilyushin Il-76 aircraft to land in Britain, including an exemption from noise restrictions.

Also in 2004, the Air Operator's Certificate of Aerocom was revoked, possibly due to connections between the airline and suspected weapons smuggler Viktor Bout. Nevertheless, the airline flew 99 tonnes of small arms out of a United States air base at Tuzla, Bosnia and Herzegovina later that year, before finally being shut down.

== Fleet ==
The Aerocom fleet consisted of the following aircraft:

- 1 Antonov An-12
- 3 Antonov An-24RV
- 1 Antonov An-26
