= IATA Operational Safety Audit =

Airline evaluation system

International Air Transport Association
- Formation: April 1945
- Headquarters: Montreal, Quebec, Canada
- Members: 240 airlines
- Key people: Tony Tyler, Director General and CEO
- Website: http://www.iata.org

The IATA Operational Safety Audit (IOSA) programme is an internationally recognised and accepted evaluation system designed to assess the operational management and control systems of an airline. IOSA uses internationally recognised quality audit principles and is designed to conduct audits in a standardised and consistent manner. It was created in 2003 by IATA. The companies are included in the IOSA registry for a period of 2 years following an audit carried out by an organization accredited by IATA. The auditing standards have been developed in collaboration with various regulatory authorities, such as the Federal Aviation Administration, the Civil Aviation Safety Authority, Transport Canada and the Joint Aviation Authorities (JAA). IATA oversees the accreditation of audit organisations, ensure the continuous development of IOSA standards and practices and manages the IOSA registry. The total IOSA registered airlines is 413 Airlines.

== Risk-Based IOSA Audits ==
Based on the fact (safety is about continuous improvement), IATA understands that airlines are doing their operational activities differently that have changed their risk profile, and it is time to change the scope of the IOSA audit to focus on a deeper understanding of current and potential safety risks of those airlines.

The risk-Based IOSA audits scope is based on a combination of industry standards and other airline-specific elements such as operational profile, safety risks, and the operator's IOSA audit history.

IATA will perform 25 risk-based audits in 2023 , and the new audit approach will not apply to initial registration audits. Furthermore, around 100 risk-based audits will follow in 2024, and the transformation will come into full effect in 2025.
