= Pecotox Air =

Airline based in Moldova

IATA	ICAO	Call sign
P3	PXA	PECOTOX
- Commenced operations: November 2001
- Ceased operations: June 2007 (resumed operations in 2016)
- Operating bases: Chişinău International Airport
- Fleet size: 2
- Headquarters: Chişinău, Moldova
- Website: pecotox.com

Pecotox Air is a charter airline based in Chişinău, Moldova.

== History ==
It started operations in November 2001 and operated passenger and freight charter services from its base at Chişinău International Airport.

In June 2007, it was announced that the Republic of Moldova had withdrawn the certificate of the airline, as it was not subject to an appropriate safety oversight, and the European Commission's Air Safety Commission in addition banned the airline from flying within the European Union. The airline has since resumed operations in mid-2016 using two Airbus A300 cargo aircraft. However, as of early 2017 both of those aircraft had been retired again.

=== Afghanistan helicopter downing ===
In July 2009, a Pecotox Air Mi-26 was shot down in Helmand province with the loss of six Ukrainian crew members. The aircraft was said to be on a humanitarian mission under NATO contract.

=== Current fleet ===
As of November 2026, Pecotox Air operates the following aircraft:

Aircraft	In service	Registration	MSN	Age
Boeing 747-409F	1	ER-MDR	30764	25.6 years
Boeing 747-467F	1	ER-MAM	32571	25.6 years

=== Previously operated ===
The Pecotox Air fleet previously included the following aircraft:

- 2 Airbus A300-600RF
- 4 Antonov An-24RV
- 2 Antonov An-26B
- 1 Antonov An-32B
- 2 Yakovlev Yak-42
