= Bavaria Germanair =

German charter airline

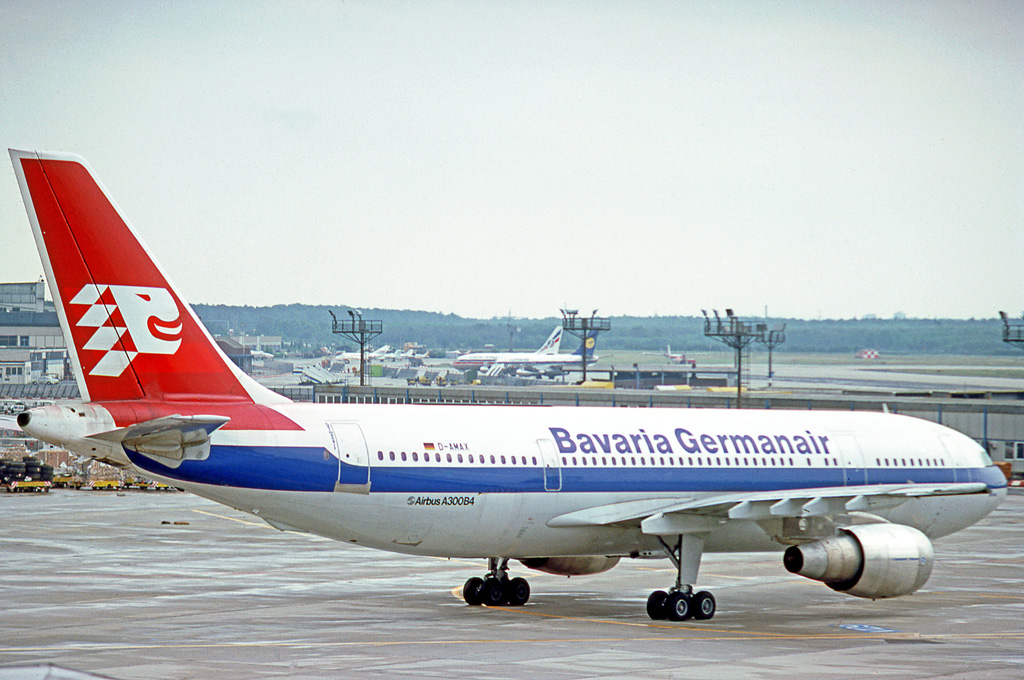
- Airbus A300B4
IATA	ICAO	Call sign
BV	-	Bavaria
- Founded: March 1, 1977
- Commenced operations: March 1, 1977
- Ceased operations: January 1, 1979
- Headquarters: Bavaria, Germany

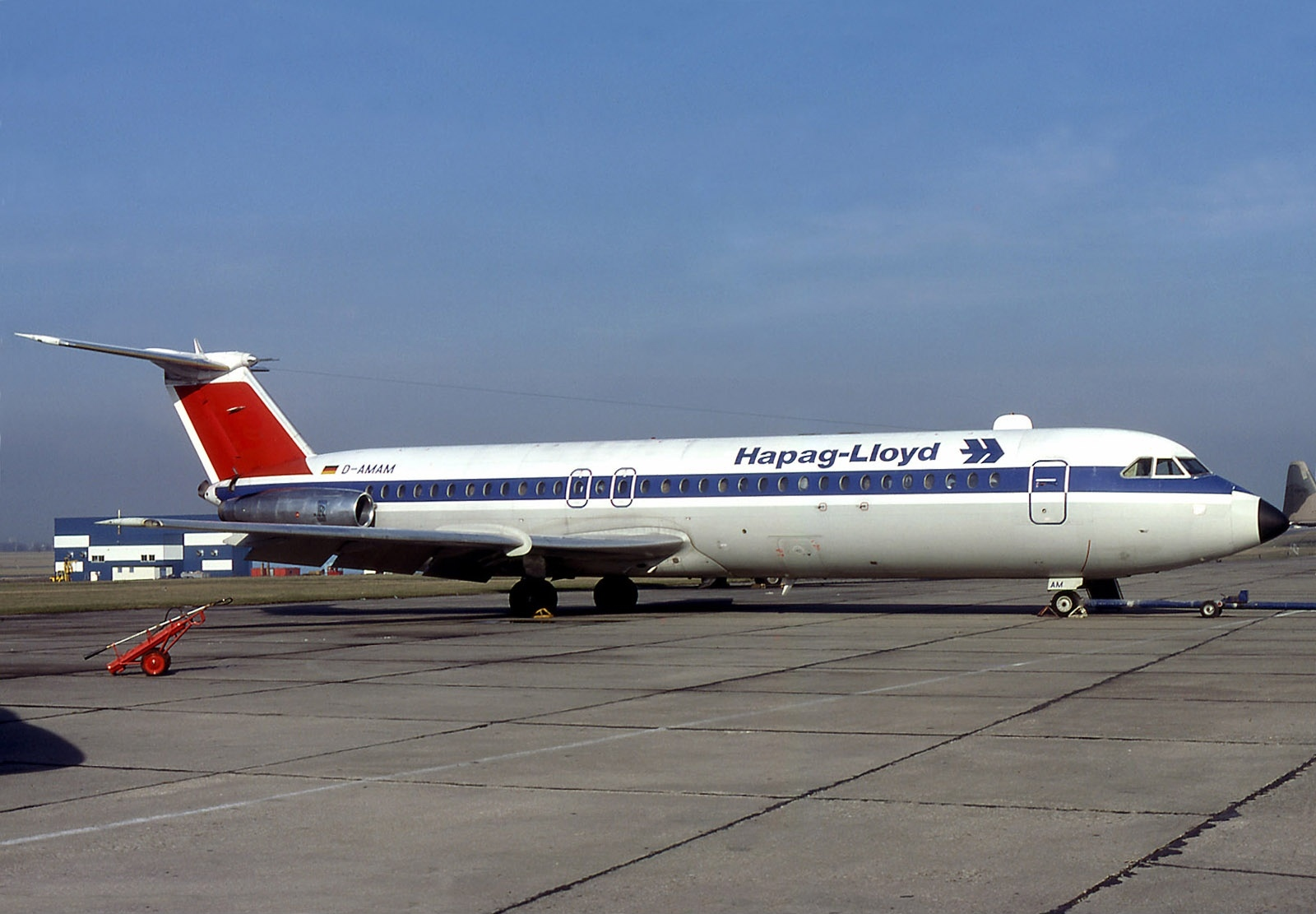
A BAC 1-11-500 already with Hapag-Lloyd titles

Bavaria Germanair was an airline that came into being following the merger of Bavaria Fluggesellschaft and Germanair on 1 January 1977 (operationally on the following 1 March).

The airline completely inherited all the activities of its two predecessors. The airline's main area of operations were charter flights from various large and medium-sized German airports to European holiday destinations.

All this lasted for a relatively short time because the airline ceased to operate and lost its separate identity when it was merged into Hapag-Lloyd Flug on 1 January 1979.

== Fleet ==
The Bavaria Germanair fleet consisted of:

- Airbus A300B4
- BAC 1-11-400
- BAC 1-11-500

An outstanding order for VFW-Fokker 614 was cancelled.
