= Hapag-Lloyd Flug =

Charter airline of Germany (1972–2007)

Hapag-Lloyd

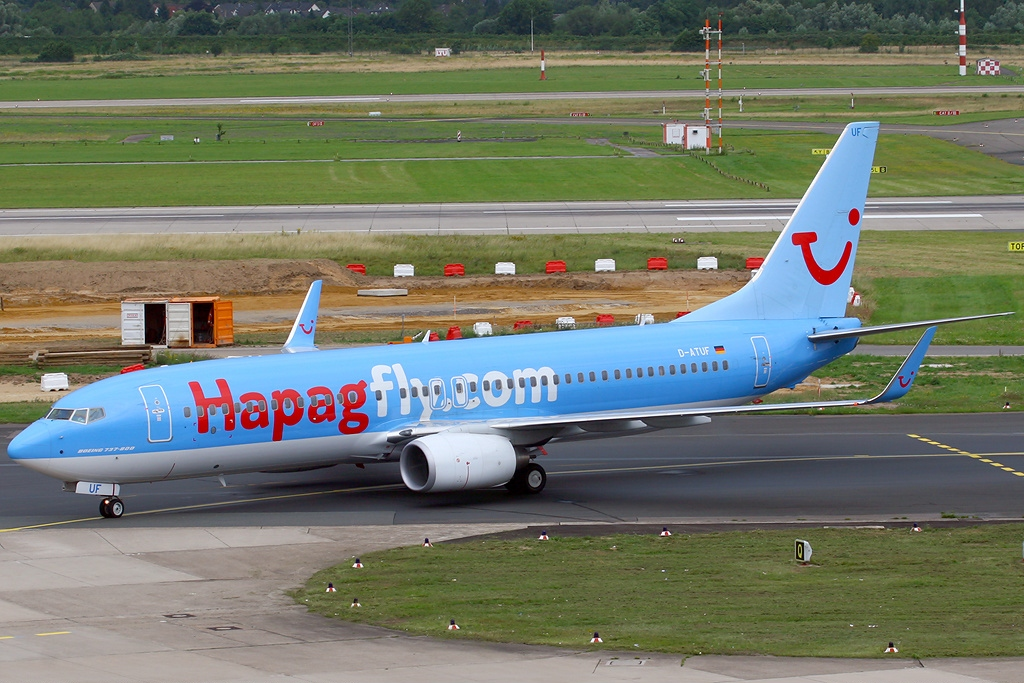
- Boeing 737-800 in the airline's last livery
IATA	ICAO	Call sign
HF	HLF	HAPAG LLOYD
- Founded: June 1972 as Hapag-Lloyd Flug - 28 April 2005 as Hapagfly
- Commenced operations: 30 March 1973 as Hapag-Lloyd Flug
- Ceased operations: 28 April 2005 as Hapag-Lloyd Flug; 15 January 2007 merged into TUI fly Deutschland
- Operating bases: Düsseldorf; Frankfurt; Hannover
- Fleet size: 32
- Parent company: TUI Group
- Headquarters: Hannover, Lower Saxony, Germany
- Key people: Christoph R. Müller
- Website: hapagfly.com

Hapag-Lloyd Flug GmbH, known as Hapagfly GmbH between 2005 and 2007, was a German leisure airline headquartered in Langenhagen, Lower Saxony Lander, that was originally founded by Hapag-Lloyd and later became a subsidiary of TUI Group. It operated scheduled and charter passenger flights mainly to holiday resorts in Europe. It merged to form TUI fly Deutschland.

== History ==
=== Foundation and early years ===
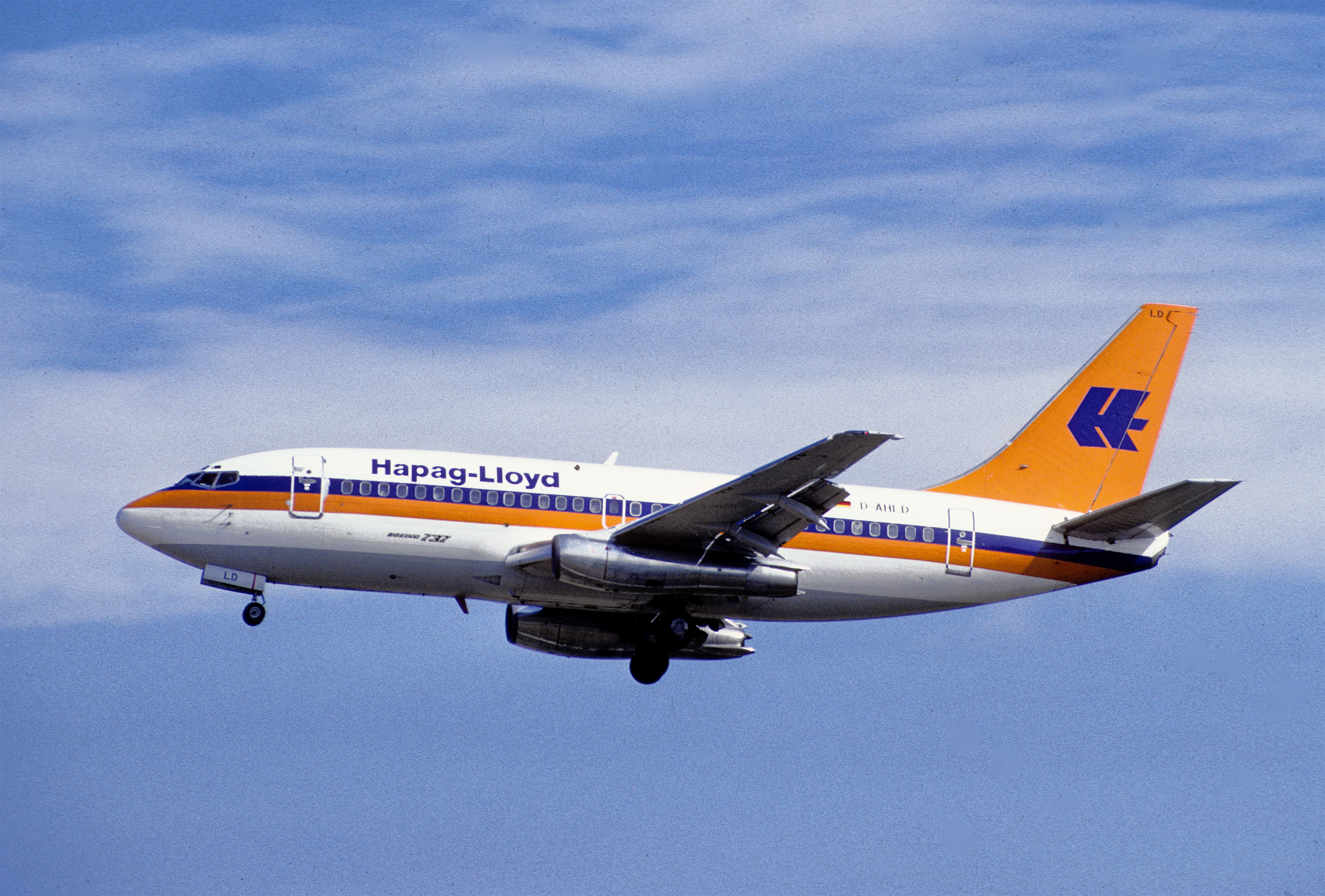
A Boeing 737-200 in the original orange and blue livery that lasted for almost three decades.

Hapag-Lloyd Flug was established in June 1972, two years after HAPAG merged with Norddeutscher Lloyd, when the Hapag-Lloyd shipping group bought a few Boeing 727s to fly its cruise passengers from Germany to the ports of call for the cruises. It began operations on 30 March 1973. With the boom of the holiday charter flight market in the 1970s, it quickly adopted charter flights to popular holiday destinations in the Mediterranean basin area and the Canary Islands as well and soon became one of the biggest German charter airlines. Throughout the years, the airline added regular passenger flights to its schedule, as well as new airplanes, such as the Boeing 737-100, Airbus A300B4 and Airbus A310 aircraft. In 1977, Bavaria Germanair, a charter air carrier operating Airbus A300B4 and BAC One-Eleven series 400 and 500 jetliners, was merged into Hapag-Lloyd Flug.

In 1998, it became the first airline in the world to adopt the Boeing 737-800.

=== New ownership and brand ===
Since 1997, it had been a subsidiary of TUI AG, which also includes the Hapag-Lloyd cargo container line and cruise line. When TUI released their new "big smile" logo in 2002, the Hapag-Lloyd livery that had remained unchanged for almost 30 years was completely changed to a new, light blue, white and red scheme with the new TUI logo on the tail to represent TUI's new corporate design. The year 2002 also saw the founding of Hapag-Lloyd Express, a low-cost airline that was to compete with the likes of Ryanair.

In 2005, the airline changed its brand to Hapagfly due to the new marketing strategy of the TUI Group since the sale of the airline from Hapag Lloyd to the leisure group. In January 2007 in a restructuring, it combined its operations with Hapag-Lloyd Express to become TUIfly, for which it operated all flights, while Hapag-Lloyd Express marketed them until TUIfly got its own license.

== Destinations ==
Hapag-Lloyd operated services from many airports in Germany mainly to European holiday resorts in the Mediterranean basin and in the Canary Islands.

== Fleet ==
Over the course of the years, Hapag-Lloyd Flug operated the following aircraft types, primarily through aircraft leasing from companies such as ILFC and GECAS.

Aircraft	Total	Introduced	Retired	Notes
Airbus A300B4	9	1979	1989	Three taken from Bavaria Germanair
Airbus A300B4	1	2005	2007	Leased from Lufthansa
Airbus A310-200	5	1988	2006	
Airbus A310-300	8	1990	2006	One written off as Flight 3378
BAC One-Eleven 500	7	1979	1981	All taken from Bavaria Germanair
Boeing 727-100	8	1972	1984	
Boeing 727-200	3	1979	1983	
Boeing 737-200	6	1981	1993	
Boeing 737-400	12	1989	2002	
Boeing 737-500	5	1990	2004	
Boeing 737-800	39	1998	2007	Launch customer

== Gallery ==
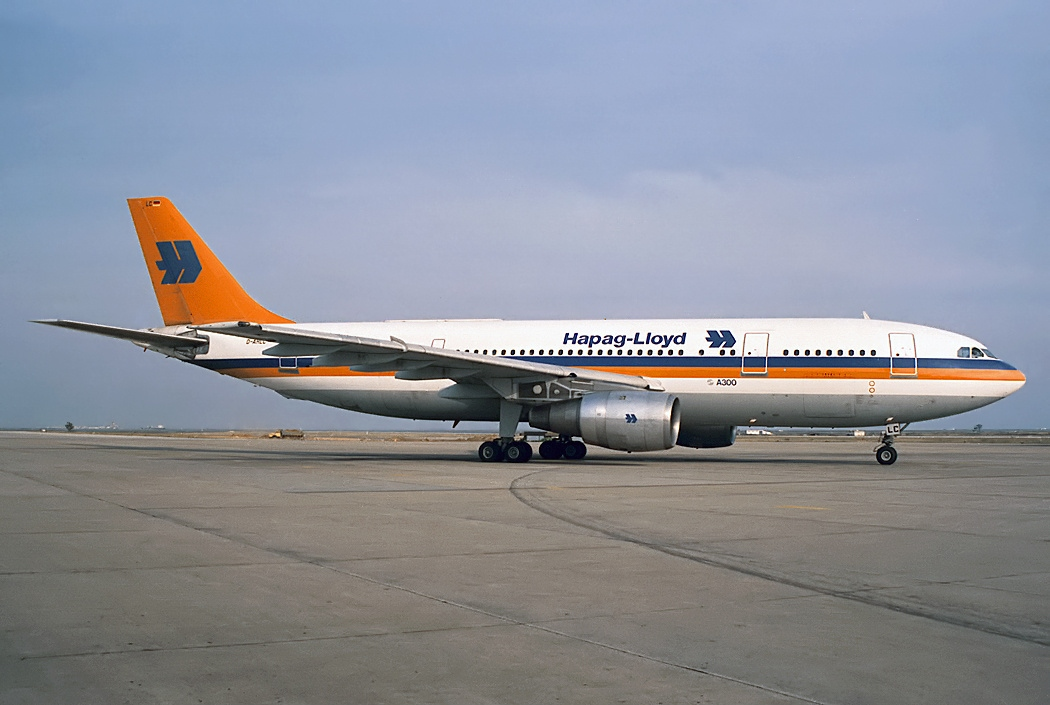
Airbus A300B4-2C

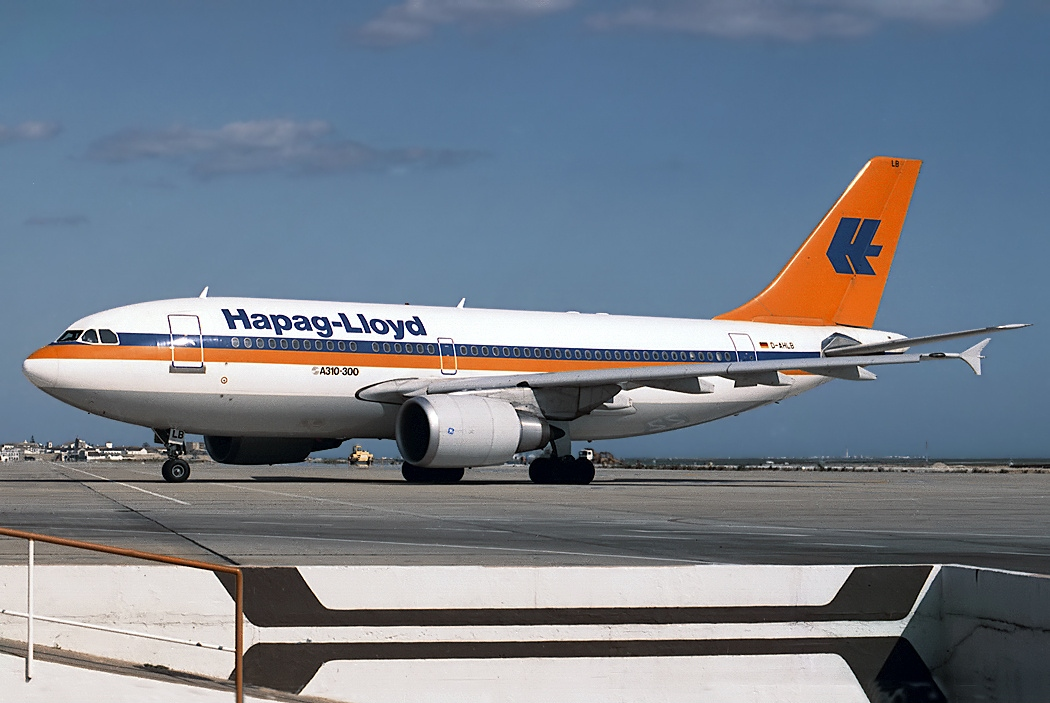
Airbus A310-304

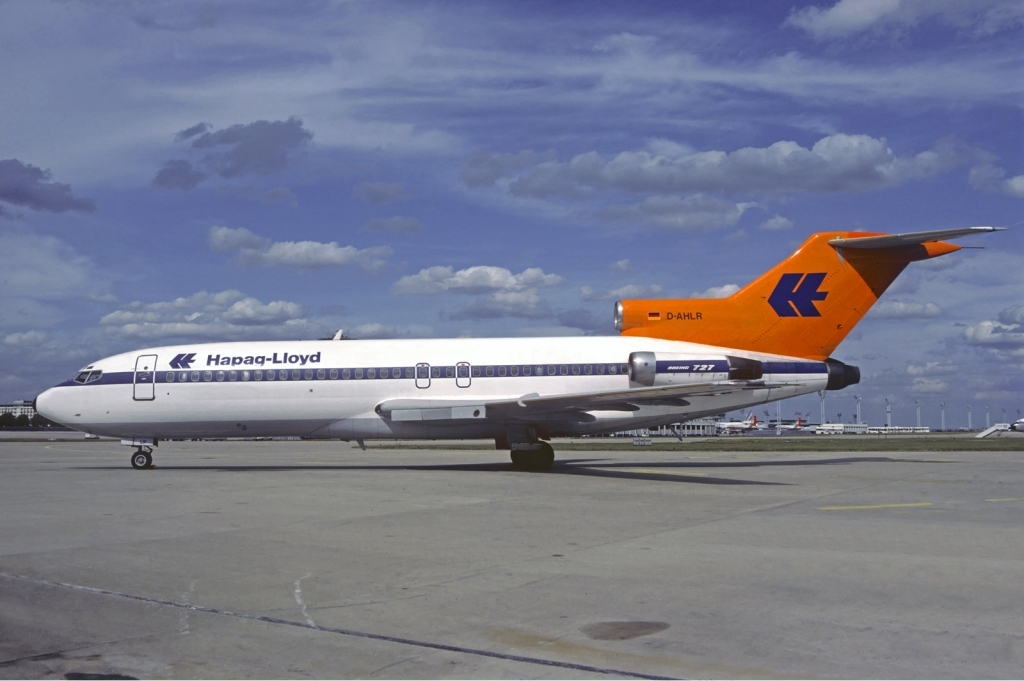
Boeing 727-100

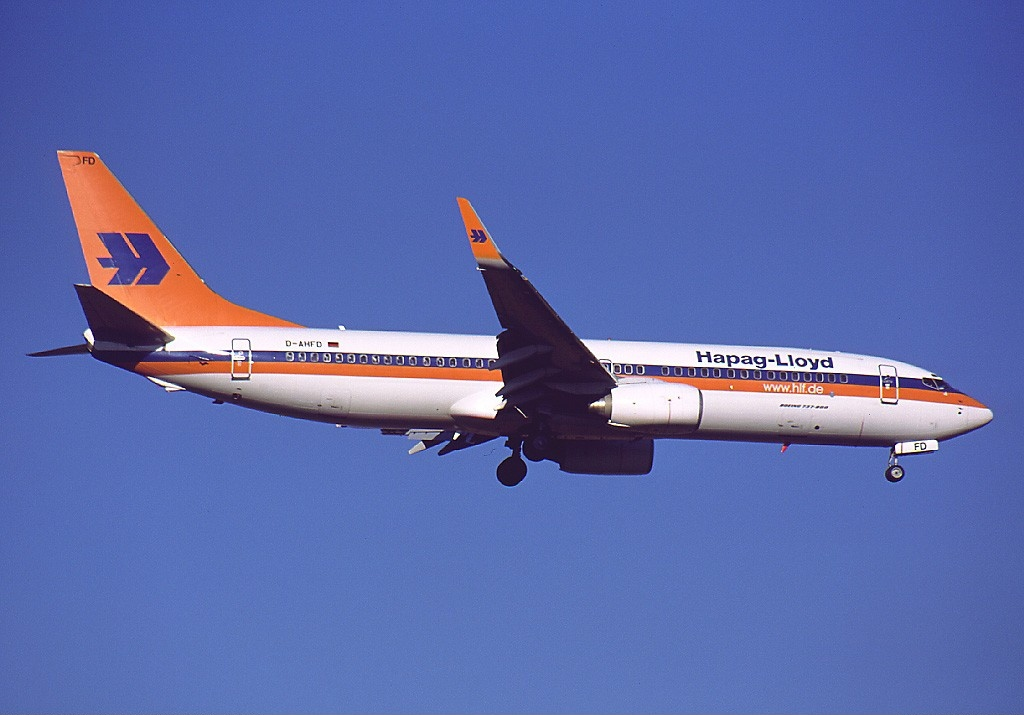
Boeing 737-8K5

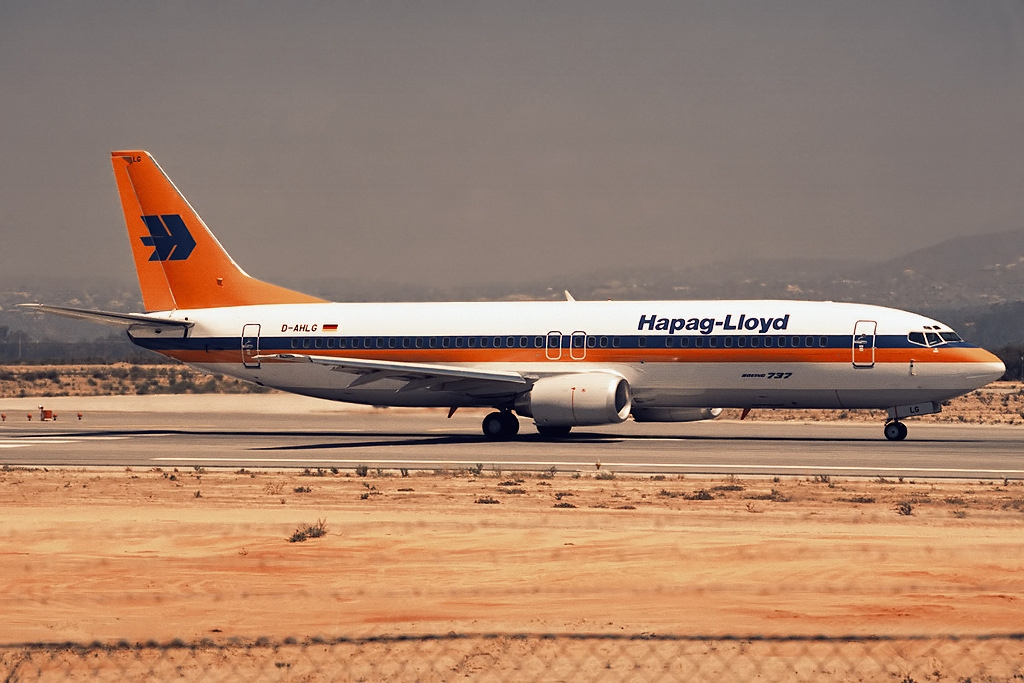
Boeing 737-4K5

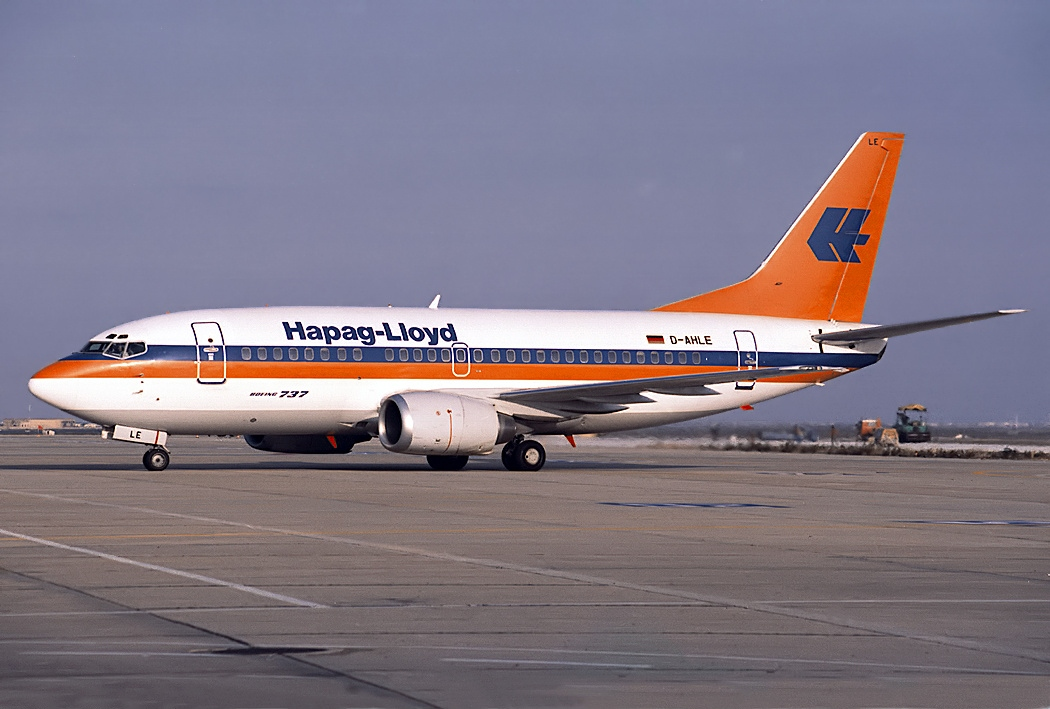
Boeing 737-5K5

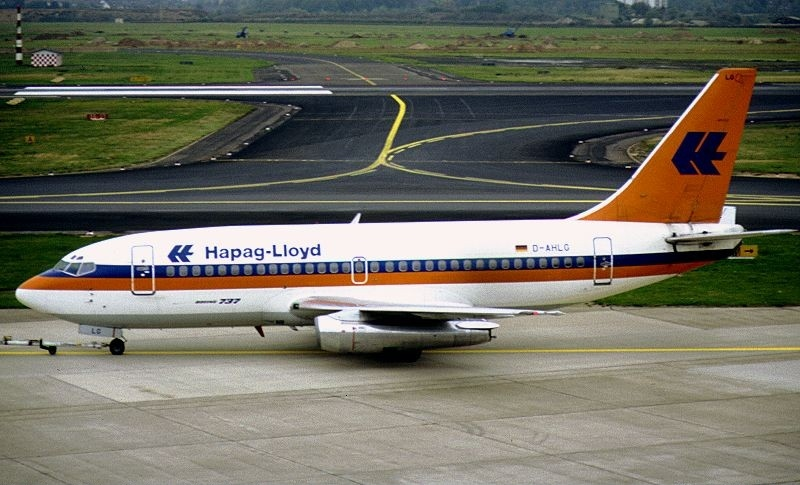
Boeing 737-2K5

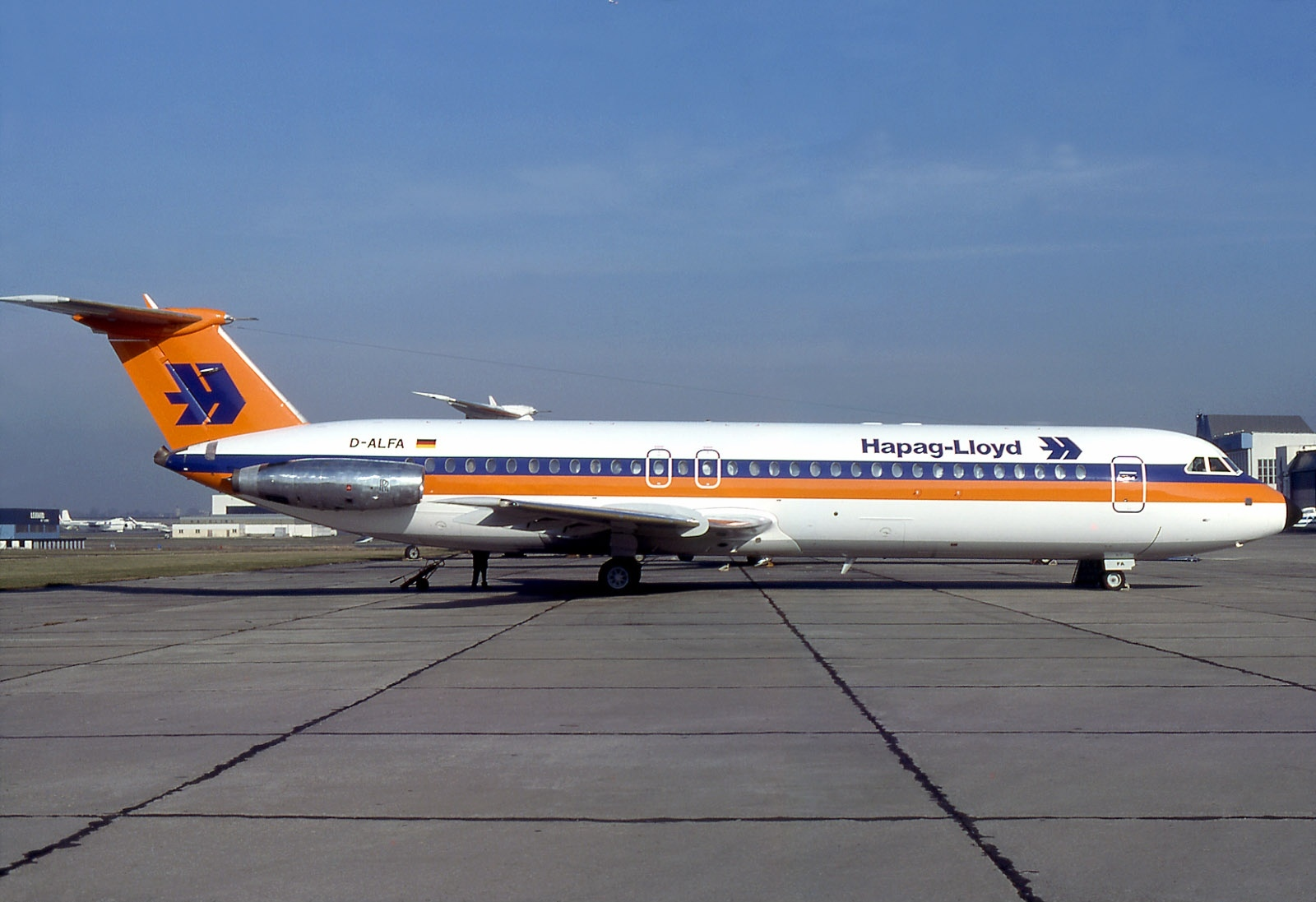
BAC 111-528FL

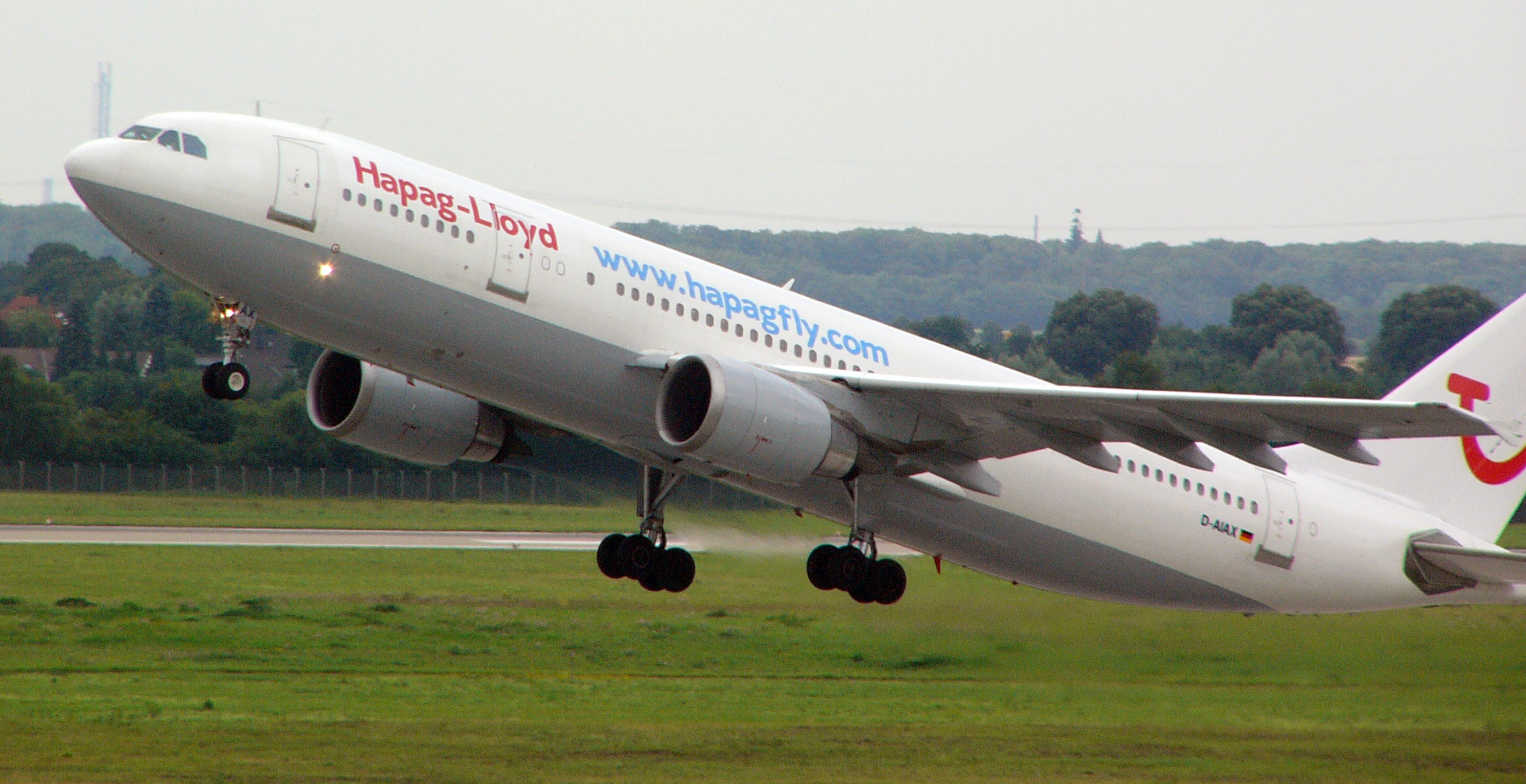
Airbus A300B

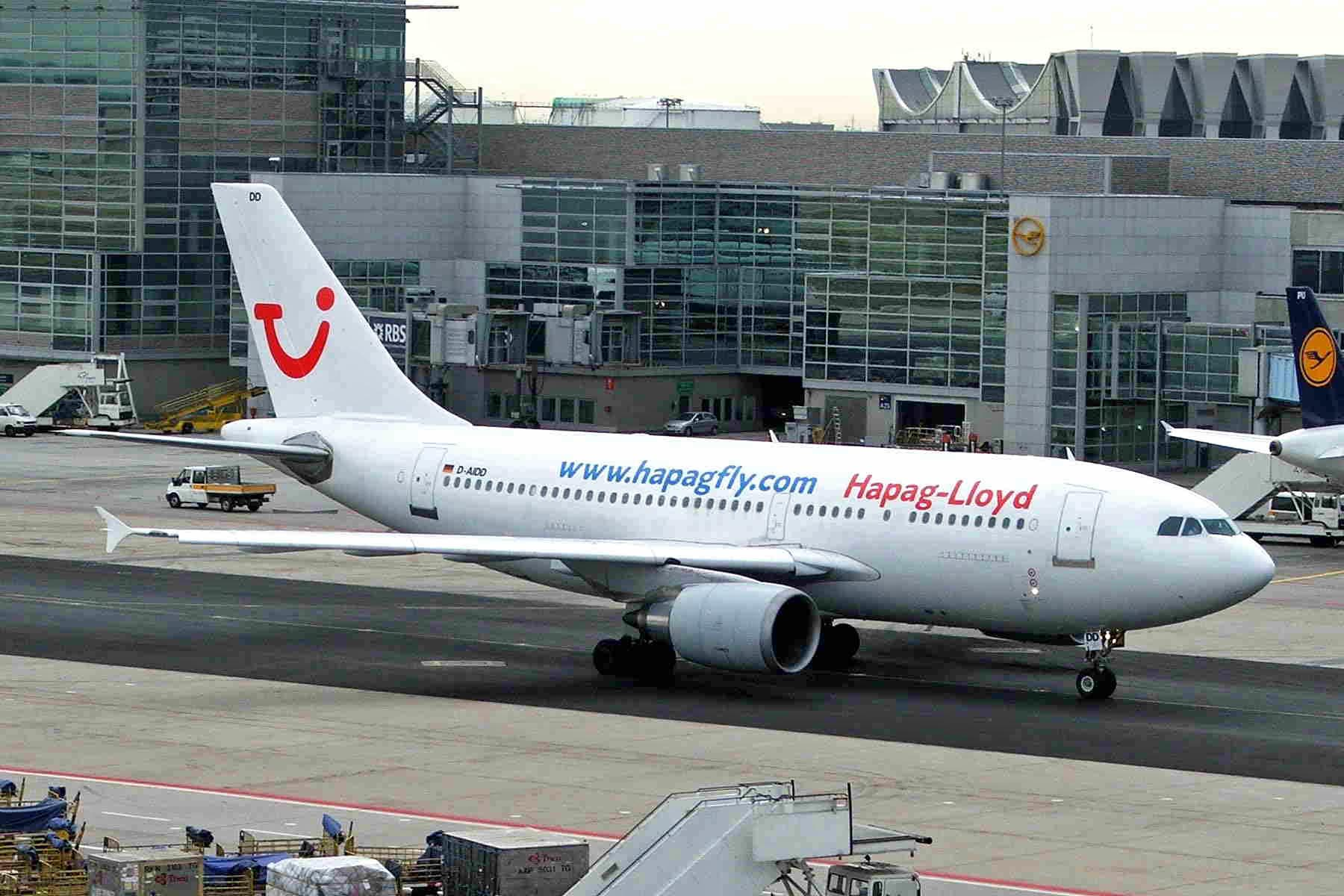
Airbus A310-300

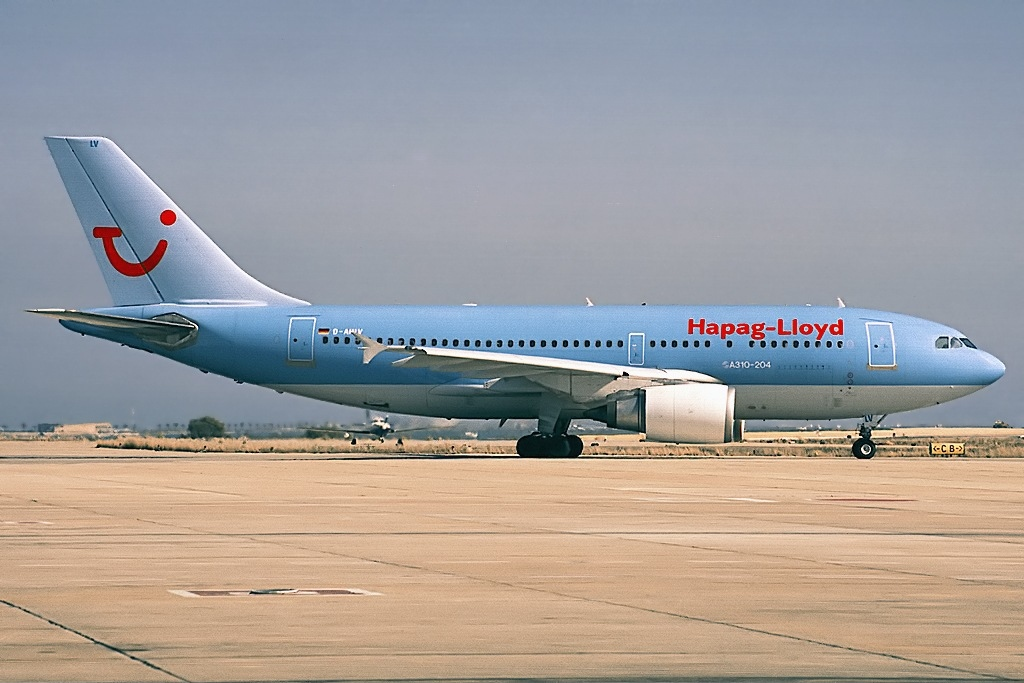
Airbus A310-204

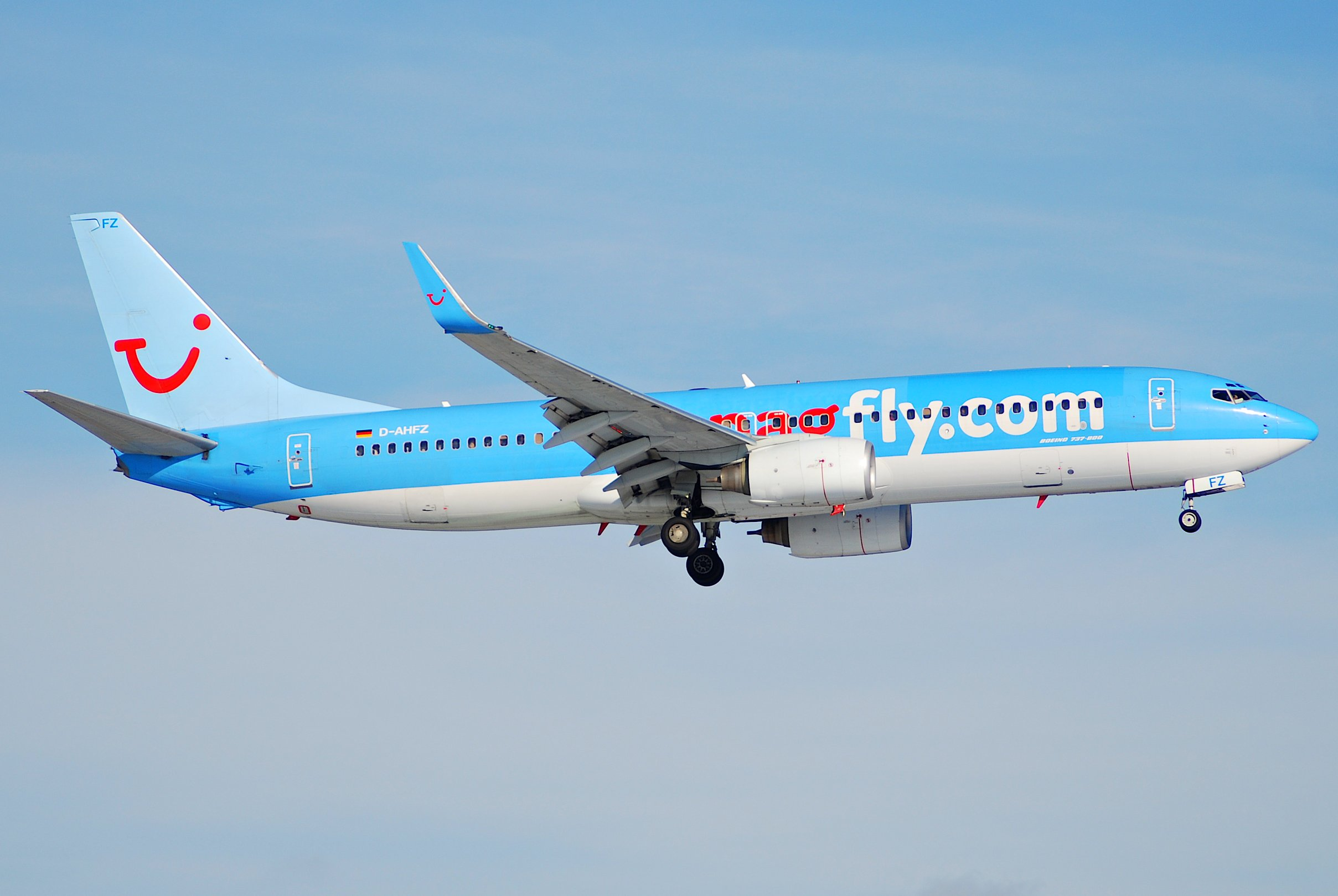
Boeing 737-800 in its last livery, in 2007

== Incidents and accidents ==
- On 12 July 2000, Hapag-Lloyd Flight 3378, an Airbus A310 flying from Chania to Hanover, suffered fuel exhaustion caused in part by the crew's decision to continue the flight despite faulty landing gear that had partially retracted, which resulted in an emergency crash landing at Vienna Airport. The aircraft was written off, and 26 people were injured. Although it was the first (and remained the only) incident in Hapag-Lloyd's history in which an aircraft was damaged and people were injured, it caused much criticism in the media. In 2004, a Hanover district court convicted Captain Wolfgang Arminger of "dangerous interference into air traffic," saying he was "endangering others' lives" mainly by failing to divert to Zagreb, and sentenced him with a six-month suspended prison sentence.

== See also ==
- List of defunct airlines of Germany
