= Bavaria Fluggesellschaft =

German airline

Bavaria

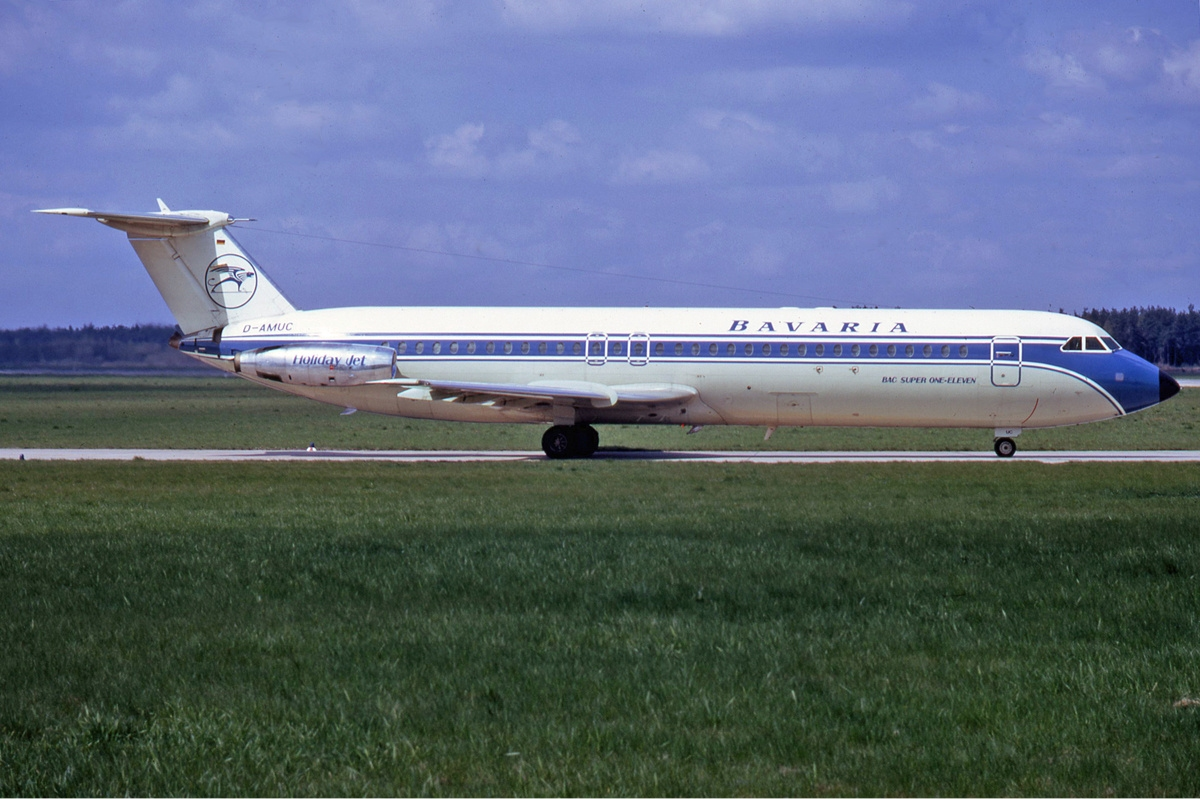
- BAC 1-11
IATA	ICAO	Call sign
BV	-	BAVARIA
- Founded: 1957
- Commenced operations: January 1958
- Ceased operations: March 1, 1977 merged to form Bavaria-Germanair
- Hubs: Munich-Riem Airport
- Fleet size: 6
- Headquarters: Munich, Germany

Bavaria Fluggesellschaft (German: [ˈfluːkɡəˌzɛlʃaft]) was a West German airline founded in 1957 and was merged with Germanair to become Bavaria Germanair in March 1977.

== History ==
This airline was founded in 1957 as Bavaria Fluggesellschaft Schwabe & Co. In January 1958 the first aircraft, a Piper PA-23 Apache, was used for air taxi work. In 1959 the Twin Beech was added. Three Douglas DC-3s were acquired in 1960 and flown until disposal in 1967 and by this time the main business was carrying freight on behalf of Lufthansa.

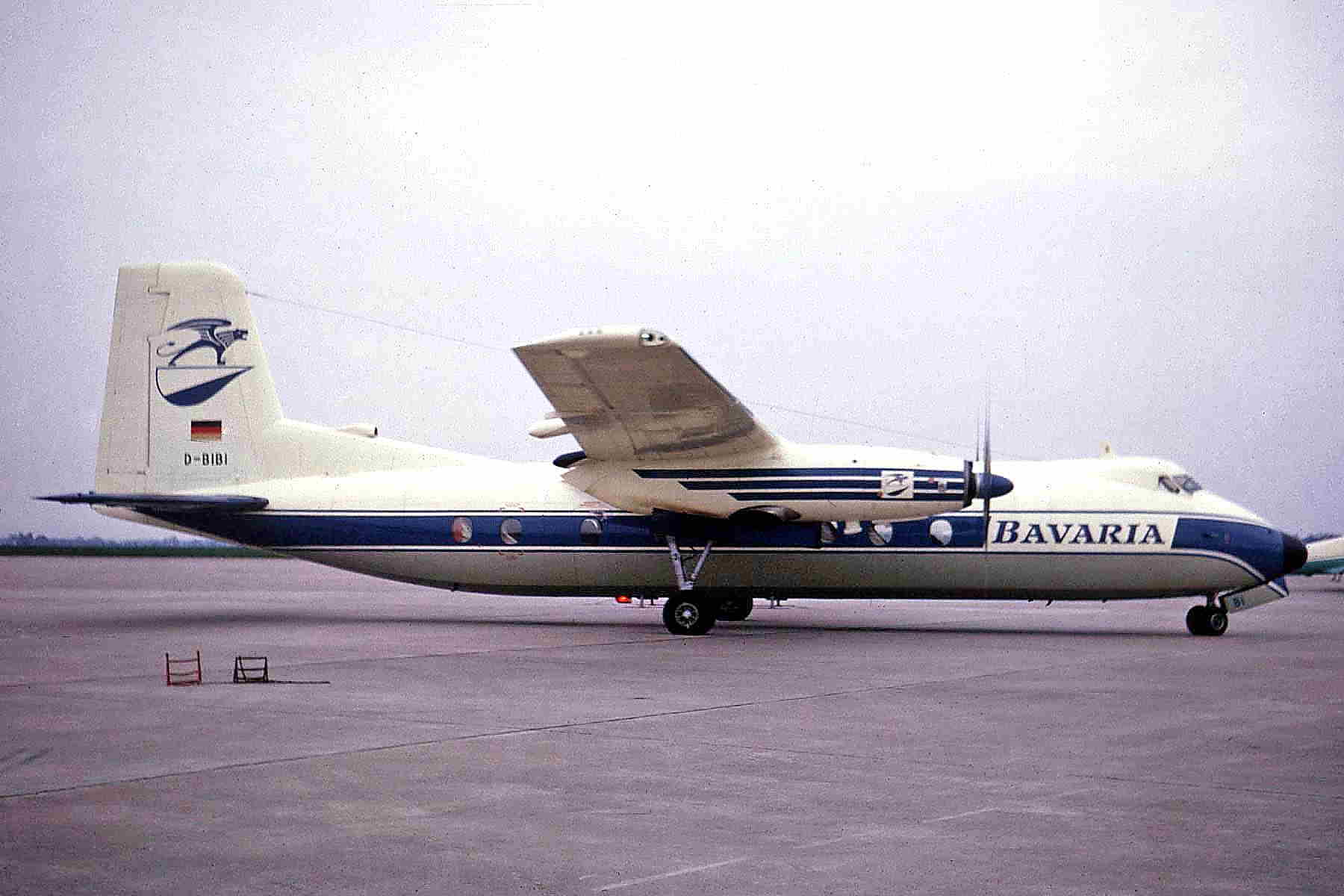
Handley Page Dart Herald in May 1964

With increased passenger traffic, the first Handley Page Dart Herald was added in 1964 and by 1966 three were in service and about 800,000 passengers were carried that year including on seasonal holiday flights to the United Kingdom. In order to expand further, the BAC 1-11 jet airliner was added to the fleet in 1968 after an aircraft had been leased for a few months in 1967. In 1969, a Handley Page Jetstream small turboprop aircraft was added to the regional schedules. The latter aircraft was involved in a fatal accident on 6 March 1970 (see below).

In 1974, a close cooperation was established with fellow airline Germanair which culminated in the merger of both airlines to become Bavaria Germanair on 1 March 1977.

== Fleet ==
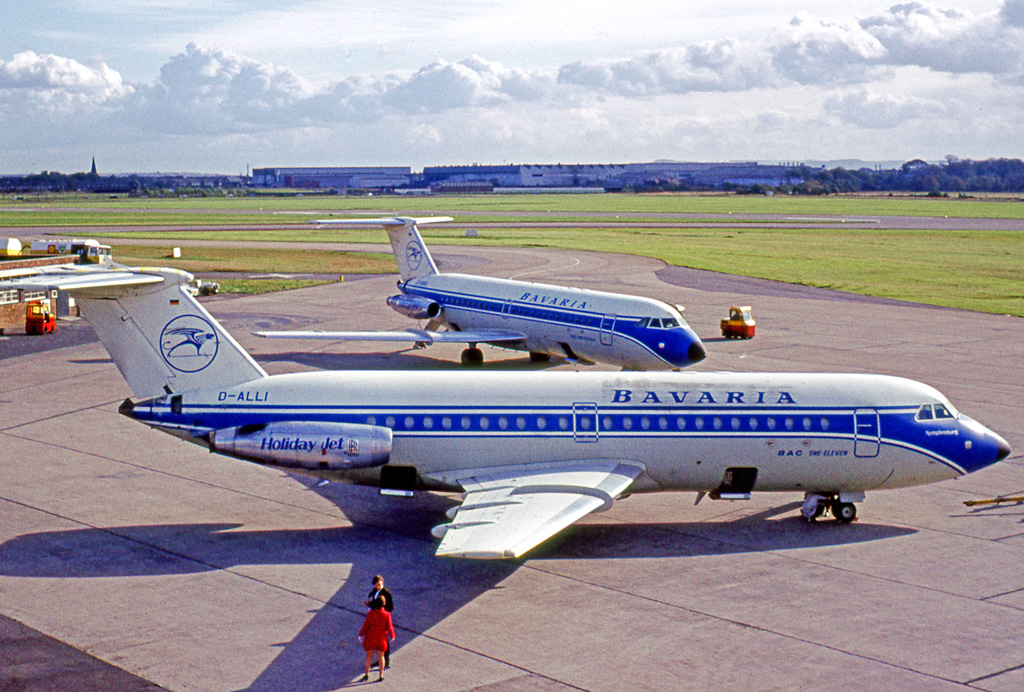
BAC 1-11s at Liverpool Airport in 1969

- Piper PA-23 Apache
- Beechcraft Twin Beech
- Douglas DC-3 (1960-1967)
- Handley Page Dart Herald (1964-1970)
- BAC 1-11 (1968-1975)
- Jetstream 31 (1969-1970)

== Accidents and incidents ==
- On 6 March 1970, a Handley Page Jetstream departed Munich-Riem Airport, West Germany, for Samedan Airport, Switzerland. The aircraft crashed into snow about 3 km (1.9 mi) and 0.5 km (0.31 mi) left of Samedan airport's runway centreline. The aircraft was written-off and all nine passengers and both crew (including the airline main animator Max Schwabe) were killed.

== Bibliography ==
- Gradidge, Jennifer M, The DC-1, DC-2, DC-3 - The First Seventy Years, Air-Britain (Historians) Ltd, 2006, ISBN 978-0851303321
