= List of defunct airlines of Germany =

This is a list of defunct airlines of Germany.

Airline	Image	IATA	ICAO	Callsign	Commenced operations	Ceased operations	Notes
A
Abacus Air					1977	1985	Operated Swearingen Metroliner
Advance Air			AXX		2012	2017	Operated Cessna 550, Piper Cheyenne II
Aero Express					1956	1957	Operated Vickers VC.1 Viking Merged into KHD
Aero Flight		GV	ARF	AERO FOX	2004	2005	
Aero Lloyd		YP	AEF	AERO LLOYD	1981	2003	
Aeroline		7E	AWU		2012	2017	Operated Cessna 550, Piper Cheyenne II. Renamed Sylt Air
Aerotec Airways					1989	1998	Operated Beech King Air, Piper Seneca
Aerotour Deutsche Luftreederei					1958	1959	Operated Douglas DC-4 and Vickers Viking
Air Berlin		AB	BER	AIR BERLIN	1991	2017	Previously a U.S.A. airline
Air Berlin Aviation		H3	TCN		2018	2018	Operated Airbus A321-200 Renamed Thomas Cook Aviation
Air Berlin USA		ZF			1979	1991	Renamed Air Berlin
Air Bremen		HR	BRN	AIR BREMEN	1989	1990	
Air Cargo Germany		6U	ACX	LOADMASTER	2009	2013	
Air Commerz			DX	AIRCOMER	1970	1972	
Air de Cologne					1987	1988	Scandinavian Airlines subsidiary. Merged into TNT
Air Evex			EVE		1975	2005	Operated Beech King Air, Cessna Citation, Hawker 800, Learjet 45
Air Germanica					1995	1996	Arcus-Air Logistics charter operations branch. Never operational
Air Lipsia		W2			2010		
Air Lloyd					1961	1964	Formed by the merger of Deutsche Nahluftverkehr and Deutsche Taxiflug
Air Omega		OE	AOW		2002	2004	
Air Service Wildgruber					2003	2009	
Air Traffic					1980s	1980s	Operated leased Swearingen Metroliners
All-Air		DZ			1966	1968	Operated Douglas DC-4 Assets sold to Transportflug
Amadeus		B5			1996	2004	
Antares Airtransport			ANM	ANTARES	2001	2005	Operated Let Turbolet
Aquair Luftfahrt					1982	1984	Operated Beechcraft 90 “King Air”
Arcus-Air Luftfahrtunternehmen					1980	1997	Previously Arcus-Air Logistics. Operated Dornier 228, Dornier 328. Transferred scheduled operations to Cosmos Air
Atlantis		NO	NOU	ATLANTIS	1968	1972	Previously Nordseeflug Sylter Lufttransport
Augsburg Airways		IQ	AUB	AUGSBURG-AIR	1996	2013	Previously Interot Airways
Augusta Air			AUF	AUGUSTA	1985	2014	Operated Cessna 560XL
Aviaction		HC		AVIACTION	1971	1973	Operated Fokker F28
Azur Air		UR	ARZ	BLUE EAGLE	2017	2018	
B
Baden Air					1998	2000	Merged into Cirrus Airlines
Badische Luftverkehrsgesellschaft					1923	1926	
Bavaria Fluggesellschaft		BV		BAVARIA	1957	1977	Merged to form Bavaria Germanair
Bavaria Germanair		BV		BAVARIA	1977	1979	Merged into Hapag-Lloyd Flug
Bayerische Luftverkehrsgesellschaft					1925	1928	
Bayerische Flugdienst (BFD)		BT			1954	1975	Operated Cessna 402 and DHC 6
Berlin Regional UK					1987	1990	Renamed Berlin European UK in 1988. Merged into Germania in 1991
Berline		BZ	TBL	BEROLINER	1991	1994	Previously Il 18 Air Cargo
Berliner Spezialflug (BSF)					1991	1996	Merged into Thuringia Airways
Blue Wings		QW	BWG	BLUE WINGS	2003	2010	
Bremenfly		8B	BFY	BORGWARDT	2009	2010	
Britannia Airways Germany		BN	DBY		1997	2001	
C
Calair		DZ		CALAIR	1970	1972	
CargoLogic Germany			GCL	SAXONIA	2019	2022	
Cimber Air		EG;GW			1953	1992	Cimber Air of Denmark subsidiary
Cirrus Airlines		C9	RUS	CIRRUS	1995	2012	
City-Air		6E	CIP	CITYWAYS	1971	2004	Previously Teuto Airways and TAG City-Air
Cologne Air Transport					1991	1996	Operated Dornier 228
Condor Berlin		DE	CIB		1998	2013	Merged into Condor of which it was a subsidiary
Condor Luftreederei					1958	1961	Merged operations into Deutsche Flugdienst
Condor-Flugdienst GmbH					1961	2013	Previously Deutsche Flugdienst. Merged into Condor
Condor Syndikat					1924	1927	
Contact Air		C3	KIS	CONTACT AIR	1974	2013	Merged assets and some operations into OLT Express Germany
Conti-Flug					1992	1994	Previously European Private Charter. Operated BAe.146
Continentale Deutsche Luftreederei					1959	1962	
Cosmos Air		ZE	AZE		1997	1999	Merged operations into Cirrus Airlines
D
Danziger Luftpost					1921	1923	
Dauair		D5	DAU	DAUAIR	2005	2006	
Debonair Deutscheland					1996	1999	British Debonair German branch. Operated leased aircraft
DELAG					1910	1935	
Delta Air Regionalflugverkehr					1978	1992	Merged into Deutsche BA
Deruluft					1921	1937	Joint German-Soviet airline
Deutsche Aero Lloyd					1923	1926	Merged with Junkers Luftverkehr to form Deutsche Luft Hansa
Deutsche BA					1992	2008	Rebranded flydba.com 2002-2003 and dba 2003-2008. Air Berlin subsidiary 2006-2008
Deutsche Flugdienst					1956	1961	Renamed Condor-Flugdienst
Deutsche Ferienflugdienst (DFD)					1989	1982	Condor brand
Deutsche Luft Hansa					1926	1945	
Deutsche Luft-Reederei					1917	1923	Rebranded as Deutsche Aero Lloyd
Deutsche Lufthansa					1955	1963	Staff, fleet and route network transferred to Interflug
Deutsche Zeppelin-Reederei					1935	1939	Successor to DELAG. Reformed in 2001.
DLR Flugbetriebe			GPL		1967		
DLT-Deutsche Luftverkehrs GmbH		DW	DLT		1974	1992	Merged into Lufthansa CityLine
E
EastWest Airlines		5D	EWT	E-WEST	1994	1995	
Elbe Air			LBR	MOTION	1995	2008	
Elbeflug					1970	1971	Never operational
Euro City Line					1995	1997	
EuroBerlin		EE	EEB	EUROBER	1988	1994	Franco-German joint airline registered in France. Go to Euroberlin France
Euro-hopper.com					2003	2003	Renamed/merged to Denim Airways
Europa-Union					1926		Did not start
European Air Express		EA	EAL	STAR WING	1999	2007	
EuroCity Line					1998	1998	
Eurowings Discover					2021	2023	Renamed Discover Airlines
Eurowings Flug					1997	2002	Eurowings sister airline
Excellent Air			GZA		1969	2007	
Express Airways					1999	2003	Traded as Farnair Germany. Farnair Europe Aviation Group subsidiary from February 1999
Express Flug Service					1973	1976	
F
Filder Air Service					1999	2000	Merged into European Air Express
Flight Travel Service (FTS)					1980	1990	Operated schedules with Cessna 404, Cessna 441, Swearingen Metroliner on behalf of City-Flug and Paderborn Airport Co.
FLM Aviation			FKI	KIEL AIR	1973	2013	
FTI Flugggesellschaft/Fly FTI		BZ	FTI	FROG-LINE	1999	2001	
Flynext					2011	2013	Operated leased Airbus A319 as Germania Express 2012-2013
G
General Air + General Air Nord + General Air Luftverkehrs		GQ		GENERAL AIR	1962	1976	
German Airways		HE	LGW	WALTER	2019	2020	Trading name of Luftfahrtgesellschaft Walter and WDL Flugdienst leasing operations. Operated European routes on behalf of Eurowings
German Cargo Services		FX	GEC		1977	1995	Merged into Lufthansa Cargo
German Sky Airlines			GHY	GERMAN SKY	20010	2012	Sky Airlines subsidiary
German Wings		PW	KFK	GERMAN WINGS	1989	1990	
Germanair GmbH		DV		GERMANAIR	1968	1977	Previously Südwestflug. Merged to form Bavaria Germanair
Germania/Germania Fluggesellschaft mbH		ST	GMI	GERMANIA	1986	2019	
Germania Express		L3	GMQ	CORGI	2003	2005	Germania subsidiary. Merged operations into Deutsche BA
Germanwings		4U	GWI	GERMANWINGS	2002	2020	Merged into Eurowings
Green Airlines					2020	2022	
H
HADAG Air		GP			1974	1983	Renamed Holiday Express
Hamburg Airlines		HX	HAS	HAMBURG AIR	1988	1997	Reformed in 1993
Hamburg Airways		HK	HAY	HAMBURG AIRWAYS	2011	2014	
Hamburg International		4R	HHI	HAMBURG JET	1999	2010	
Hanseflug			HFL	HANSEFLUG	1992	2013	
Hapag-Lloyd Express		X3	HLX	YELLOW CAB	2002	2010	Merged into TUIfly
Hapag-Lloyd Flug		HF	HLF	HAPAG LLOYD	1973	2010	Branded Hapagfly 2005-2010. Merged into TUIfly
K.G. Hellinger GmbH & Co.					1955	1985	Operated local routes as Westküstenflug with Cessna 172, Partenavia P.68, Piper PA-23
Holiday Express		HL (HX)	HLE	HOLIDAY EXPRESS	1983	1988	Previously HADAG Air. Traded as Hanse Express 1986-1988
Hössl & Winkler Fluggesellschaft					1976	1982	Operated local routes with Cessna 404, Cessna 441, Swearingen Metroliner branded HW Air
I
Interflug		IF	IFL	INTERFLUG	1959	1991	Inherited assets of Deutsche Lufthansa in 1963.
Interot Airways					1981	1996	Previously Interot Air Service. Renamed Augsburg Airways
Interregional (IFG)		IP			1968	1974	
J
Jetair		JA		JETAIR	1984	1985	
Jetisfaction					2011	2012	
Junkers Luftverkehr					1924	1926	Merged with Deutsche Aero Lloyd to form Deutsche Luft Hansa
K
KHD-Karl Herfurtner Düsseldorf					1956	1957	Charter airline which operated Douglas DC 4, Vickers “Viking”
L
Lloyd-Luftdienst							
Louisair					2020s	2020s	
LowFare Jet					2002	2003	
LTU International/Lufttransport Unternehmen		LT	LTU	LTU	1955	2011	Previously Lufttransport Union. Merged into Air Berlin
LTU-Süd International Airways		LU	LTS		1987	1997	Previously LTS-Lufttransport-Süd. Merged into LTU International
Luftfahrtgesellschaft Walter (LGW)		HE	LGW	WALTER	1980	2020	
Lufthansa CityLine		CL	CLH	HANSALINE	1992	2026	Previously DLT. Integrated into Lufthansa
Luftverkehr Friesland-Harle (LFH)					1983	2014	Merged into FLN Frisia Luftverkehr
Luftverkher Wilhelmshaven-Friesland (Erich Passon)					1956	1983	Operated local routes with BN.2, Cessna 402, Cessna 310, Cessna 206 in early 1980s
M
Merkur Luft/Luftmerkur Bedarsflug					1972	1973	Operated local routes with DH.114 Heron
N
Naske Air					1992	2000	Previously Braunschweig-Flug. Operated local routes with Swearingen Metroliner
Nürnberger Flugdienst (NFD)		NS	NFD	FLAMINGO	1975	1992	Merged to form Eurowings
Nightexpress			EXT	EXECUTIVE	1984	2017	
Nora Air Services					1970	1972	Never operational
Nord-Europa-Union					1923	1926	Merged into Europa Union
Nordseeflug Sylter Lufttransport					1966	1968	Operated Douglas DC 3 and Douglas DC 7. Renamed Atlantis
O
Oberschlesische Luftverkehrsgesellschaft					1925	1937	
(1st) OFD Ostfriesischer-Flug-Dienst					1959	1974	Assets split between DLT Luftverkehrs GmbH, and OLT-Ostfriesische Lufttransport (OLT Express Germany)
(2nd) OFD-Ostfriesischer-Flug-Dienst					2011	2013	
OLT Express Germany		OL	OLT	OLTRA	2011	2013	Previously OLT-Ostfriesische Lufttransport (1974)
OLT Express Regional					2011	2012	Pooled with OLT Express Germany
P
Paninternational		DR		DELTA ROMEO	1969	1971	Previously Panair
Pleuger Flugdienst					1976	1978	Operated local routes with Piper PA-31
PrivatAir GmbH			PTG		2003	2018	PrivatAir subsidiary
R
Ratioflug			RAT	BATMAN	1982	1998	
Regional Air Express			REW	REGIONAL WINGS	2004	2010	
RFG Regionalflug		VG	RFG	RFG	1976	1992	Merged to form Eurowings
Rhein-Neckar Air					2014	2024	
Rheingau Air Service		KG			1974	1983 (or 1979)	
Rheinland Air Service		RW	RLD		1973	2002	Renamed RAS Fluggesellschaft
Roland Air					1980	1990	Operated BN.2, BN.2 Mk.III, Cessna “Skyhawk”, Swearingen Metroliner. Merged operations into OLT-Ostfriesische Lufttransport (OLT Express Germany)
S
Saarland Airlines		QW	SLL	AARLAND	1992	1993	
Sächsische Luftverkehrsgesellschaft					1924	1926	
Saxonia Airlines (SAL)					1991	1996	Merged into Thuringia Airlines
Senator Aviation Charter					1985	?	
Special Air Transport/SAT Flug (SAT)		JO	DST		1978	1986	Merged operations into Germania
Schlesische Luftverkehrsgesellschaft							
SkyTeam Luftfahrtunternehmen					1998	2002	
Small Planet Airlines GmbH		5P	LLX	GERMANJET	2015	2018	Lithuanian Small Planet Airlines subsidiary
Star XL German Airlines			GXL		2006	2006	Renamed XL Airways Germany
Stuttgarter Flugdienst			FFD	FIRST FLIGHT	1959	2019	
Südavia		FV	VXY	SUDAVIA	1984	1990	
Südflug-Süddeutsche Fluggesellschaft		SZ		SUEDFLUG	1955	1969	Bought by Lufthansa and merged into Condor
Südwestflug					1965	1968	Renamed Germanair
SunExpress Deutschland		XG	SXD	SUNRISE	2011	2020	
T
Tel Aviv Air		U8	CYF	TUS AIR	2021	2022	
Tempelhof Express Airlines		FC	SBY		1998	2001	Previously Thuringia Airways. Merged into OLT-Ostfriesische Lufttransport (OLT Express Germany)
Thomas Cook Aviation		H3	TCN		2018	2020	Previously Air Berlin Aviation
Thuringia Airlines (TAL)		FC	SBY		1996	1998	Renamed Tempelhof Express Airlines
Trans-Avia Flug				TAD	1957	1959	Operated Douglas DC 4, Vickers Viking
TransAer Cologne					1999	2000	Translift Airways (IRELAND) subsidiary
Trans-Europa-Union					1923	1926	Merged to form Europa Union
Transportflug					1965	1970	Renamed Calair
Triple Alpha Luftfahrtgesellschaft					1995	2011	
V
Vibro Air Flugservice			VIB		1994	2013	
W
WDL Aviation (Koln)					1991		Renamed German Airways
WDL Flugdienst		WE			1955	1991	Operations transferred to WDL Aviation (Koln). Renamed WDL Luftschiff
Westflug			WFA				
Wirtschaftsflug		WS			1979	1982	
X
XL Airways Germany		X4	GXL	STARDUST	2006	2012	Previously Star XL German Airlines
Y
Yourways			PWY		2017	2019	

== See also ==
- List of airlines of Germany
- List of airports in Germany
