= SkyTeam Luftfahrtunternehmen =

Skyteam
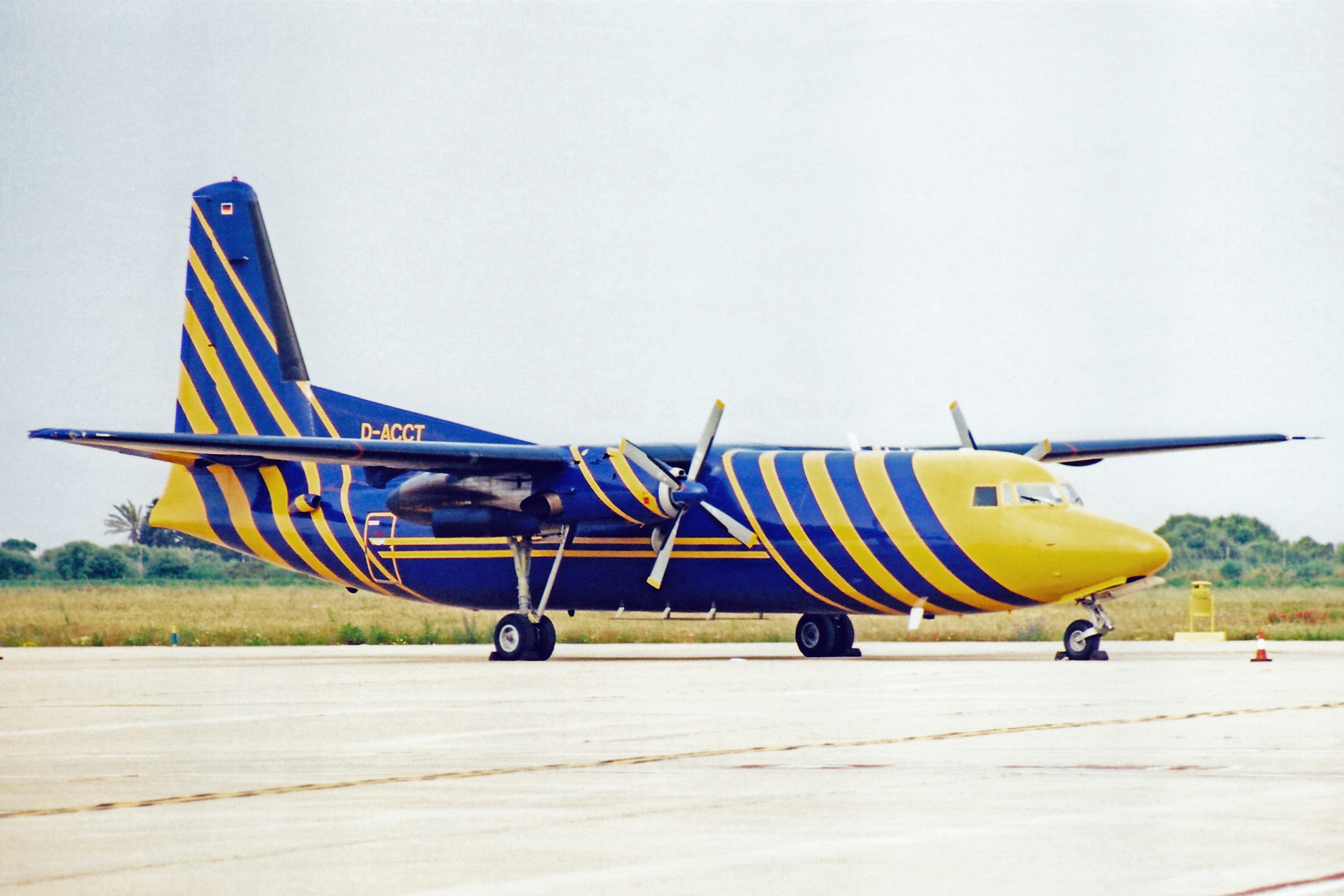
IATA	ICAO	Call sign
-	XST	SKYTEAM
- Founded: 1997
- Ceased operations: 2002
- Hubs: Frankfurt Airport
- Fleet size: 5

Skyteam was an airline based in Germany.

== History ==
SkyTeam was founded in November 1997, and starting in April of the following year, the company operated cargo flights for DHL using an initial Fokker F-27-500. A second F-27-500—this one in a passenger configuration—joined the fleet in July 1998, prior to SkyTeam joining the European Regions Airline Association in March 1999. Around October, the company acquired a third F-27-500 in a cargo configuration; this enabled operations such as transporting military mail between Germany and Macedonia for KFOR on behalf of the Federal Ministry of Defence, while also serving Leipzig, London, Paris, and Cologne/Bonn for DHL. SkyTeam had to abandon the plan—originally envisaged for that time—to deploy a CASA CN-235 in a "quick-change" configuration which was later to be succeeded by a CASA C-295, because the manufacturer refused to carry out the modifications required for operation in German airspace free of charge.

In April 2000, the newly founded, independent SkyTeam alliance was granted permission to use the brand identity of the same name in parallel; SkyTeam Luftfahrtunternehmen GmbH held the naming rights to this brand in Germany. In return, the alliance held out the prospect of cooperation on European regional routes, for which the deployment of additional aircraft was envisaged. Nevertheless, in October, SkyTeam filed an application with the European Intellectual Property Office for the trademark "Magic Airways – Quality Airlift," although the name was never actually used prior to the company ceasing operations.

Towards the end of the same year, the existing in-house maintenance operation was relocated to Karlsruhe/Baden-Baden Airport after the available space in Frankfurt had become insufficient.

In mid-2001, SkyTeam received its first ATR 72-200, which entered service in September. For a time, a second ATR 72 was leased from the airline European Air Express was also operated. Later that year it suspended its operations and was ultimately removed from the list of active airlines in Germany.

== Fleet ==
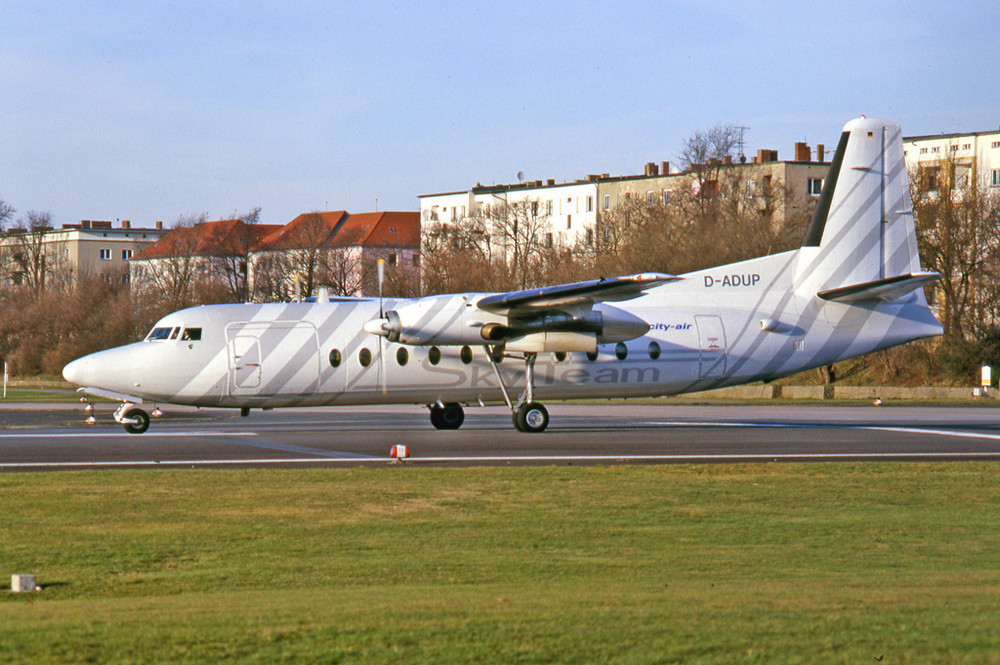
Fokker F 27 of Skyteam operated for City-air Germany

Aircraft	Number of	Entered	notes
ATR 72-212	2	2001	leased from European Air Express
ATR 72-212	2	2001	leased from European Air Express
Fokker F-27-500 Friendship	3	1998	
Fokker F-27-500 Friendship	3	1999	
Fokker F-27-500 Friendship	3	1998	
Gesamt	5		

== See also ==
- List of defunct airlines of Germany
