= KFK (disambiguation) =

KFK may refer to:

- Kristiansund FK, a Norwegian association football club from Kristiansund
- Kung Fu Kids, a Philippine produced live-action fantasy series
- German Wings, the ICAO code KFK
- ISO 639:kfk, the ISO 639 code for the Kinnauri language
