= Wirtschaftsflug =

West German cargo airline

Wirtschaftsflug Rhein main
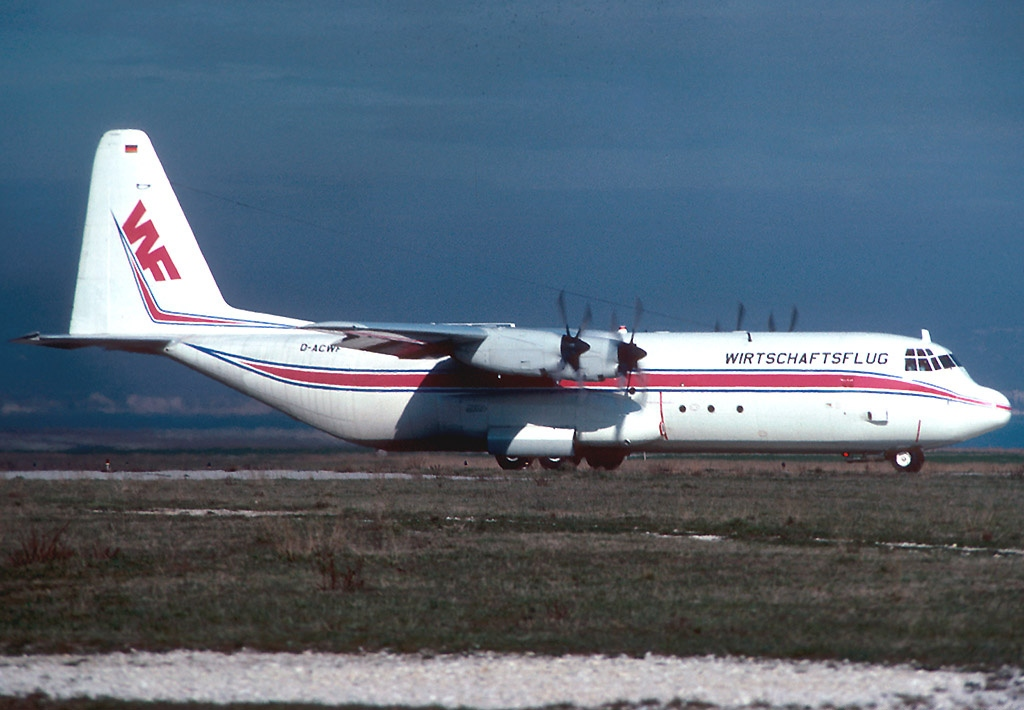
- Lockheed L-100-30
IATA	ICAO	Call sign
-	WS	—
- Founded: 1972
- Commenced operations: 1973 (airline-type operations in 1979)
- Ceased operations: 1982
- Hubs: Frankfurt Airport
- Fleet size: 3
- Employees: 40

Wirtschaftsflug was a West German cargo airline based in Offenbach am Main. It operated from late 1979 to early 1980s.

== History ==
Wirtschaftsflug was founded in 1972 by Heinz Dieter Hoppenstaedt. It initially started with business flights and air taxi services. In 1979 inclusive tour and contract flights were started. In that same year an Aero Commander was added for cargo flights along with a Fairchild F 27J leased from WDL Aviation. In 1980 Wirtschaftsflug began cooperating with newspaper Extra-Tip and operating flights to major european cities from Kassel Around the same time Wirtschaftsflug began using a Lockheed C 100 to regions like Africa and the Middle East. In 1982 Wirtschaftsflug ceased operations.

== Fleet ==
- 1 x Lockheed L-100-30
- 2 x Fairchild F-27
- Cessna Citation
- Rockwell Commander

== See also ==
- List of defunct airlines of Germany
