= Interregional Fluggesellschaft =

Interregional Fluggesellschaft (IFG)
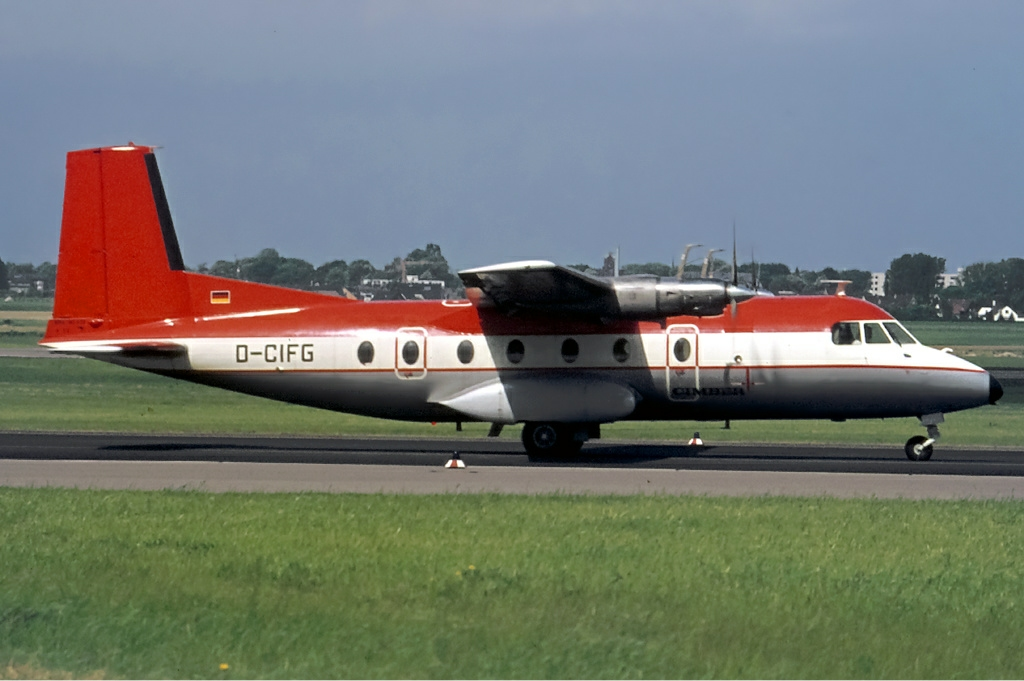
- Nord 262
IATA	ICAO	Call sign
IP	—	—
- Founded: August 1967
- Commenced operations: 1968
- Ceased operations: January 1974
- Fleet size: 2
- Employees: 45

Interregional Fluggesellschaft mbH (IFG) was a German regional airline that was based in Dusseldorf. It was active in the first part of 1970s.

== History ==
IFG origins can be traced back to 1966 when LTU began using the Düsseldorf-Hanover and Düsseldorf-Bremen routes which were subsidized by the state of North Rhine-Westphalia with its Fokker 27. The airline initially used Lufthansa flight numbers. Shortly after the Düsseldorf-Saarbrücken route was added with a Nord 262. The load factor for these flights were 40%.

Interregional Fluggesellschaft GmbH (IFG) was then founded in August 1967 as an LTU subsidiary but started flying officially on 1 January of the following year taking over all the above mentioned routes. The fleet was made up by a Fokker 27 and two Nord 262. A seasonal connection to Westerland/Sylt was added in the early 1970s. Especially on weekends, the fleet was also engaged in short and medium-haul charter flights, focusing on southern Europe (Italy, Corsica island). Rising fuel prices and an ATC strike led to IFG ceasing to fly on 25 January 1974.

== Fleet ==
- 2 x Fokker F-27 in service 1969-1974
- 2 x Nord 262 in service 1972-1974

== See also ==
List of defunct airlines of Germany
