= Yourways =

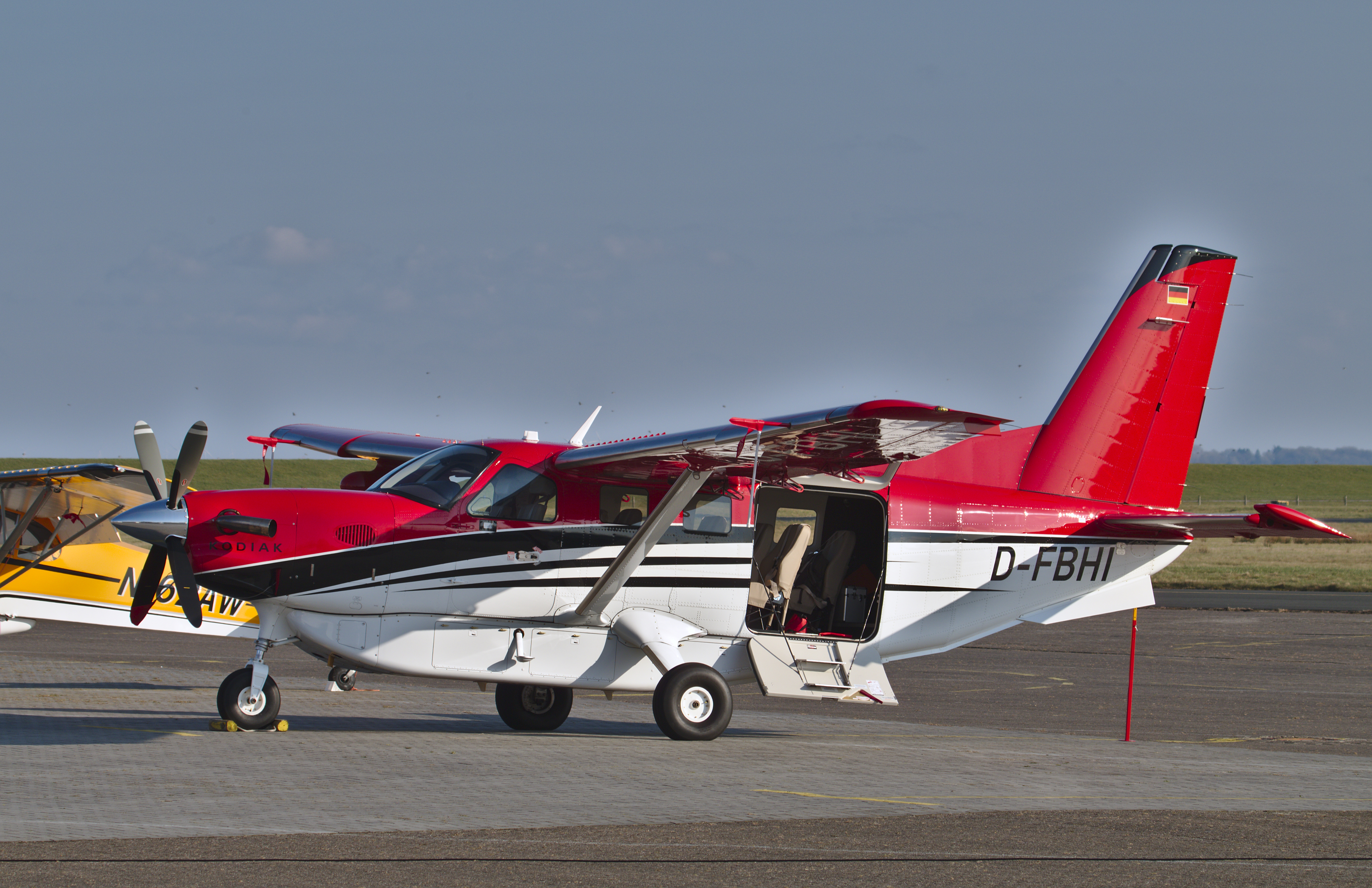
IATA	ICAO	Call sign
-	PWY	-
- Founded: 2016
- Commenced operations: December 15, 2017
- Ceased operations: 2019
- Fleet size: 5

Yourways was a German aviation company that existed from 2016 to 2019.

== History ==
Yourways was initially founded as Privateways and on December December 15, 2017 as Yourways and commenced operations with a Quest Kodiak 100. Flights to Sylt Airport were initially operated from JadeWeserAirport ( Wilhelmshaven ) . Connections to Sylt Airport were added on June 1, 2018. In 2019 the airline ceased to exist.

== Fleet ==
Plane	total	fate
Dassault Falcon 50EX	1	operated by Pro Jet
HondaJet HA-420	1	
Quest Kodiak 100	1	
Raytheon Premier 1	1	
Raytheon Premier 1A	1	
total	5	

== See also ==
List of defunct airlines of Germany
