= Air100 =

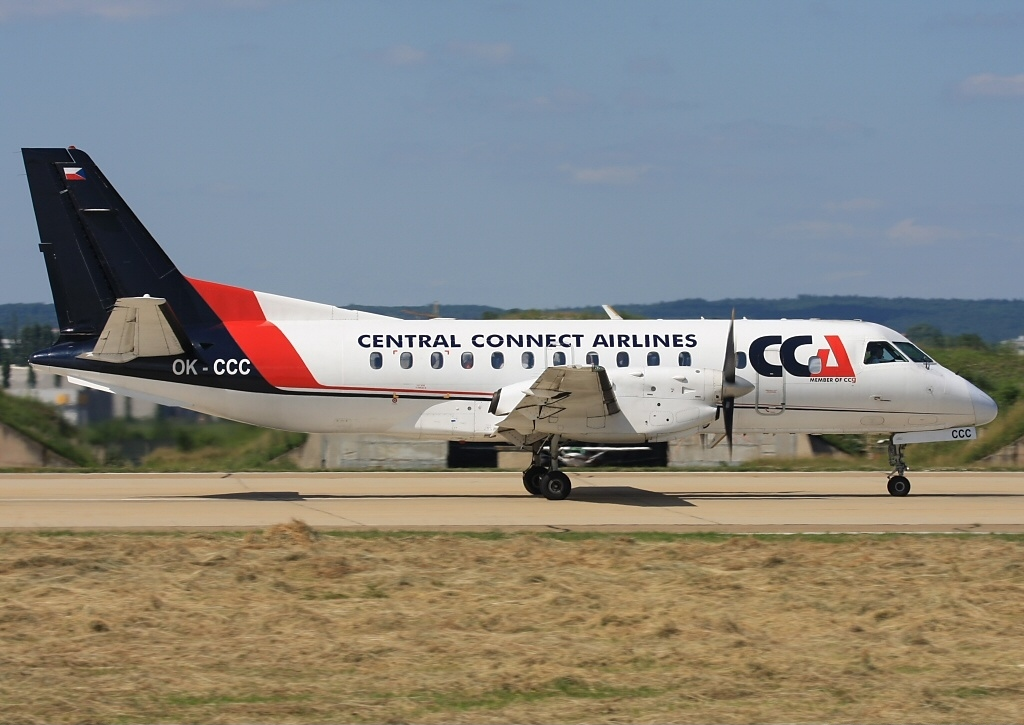
- Founded: 2012
- Ceased operations: 2014
- Hubs: Helsinki Airport and Pori Airport
- Fleet size: 2 Saab 340s
- Parent company: Central Connect Airlines

Air100 was a Finnish regional airline and virtual carrier. Air100 began daily flights from Pori to Helsinki in September 2012. They flew to up to five regional destinations across Finland, with Helsinki - Pori being the last remaining route as of June 2014.

Air100 flights were operated by the Czech Central Connect Airlines (CCA), which used two Saab 340 aircraft for these until CCA ceased operations in June 2014. Therefore, the Air100 flights between Helsinki and Pori ceased until further notice.
