= German Airways =

German regional airline

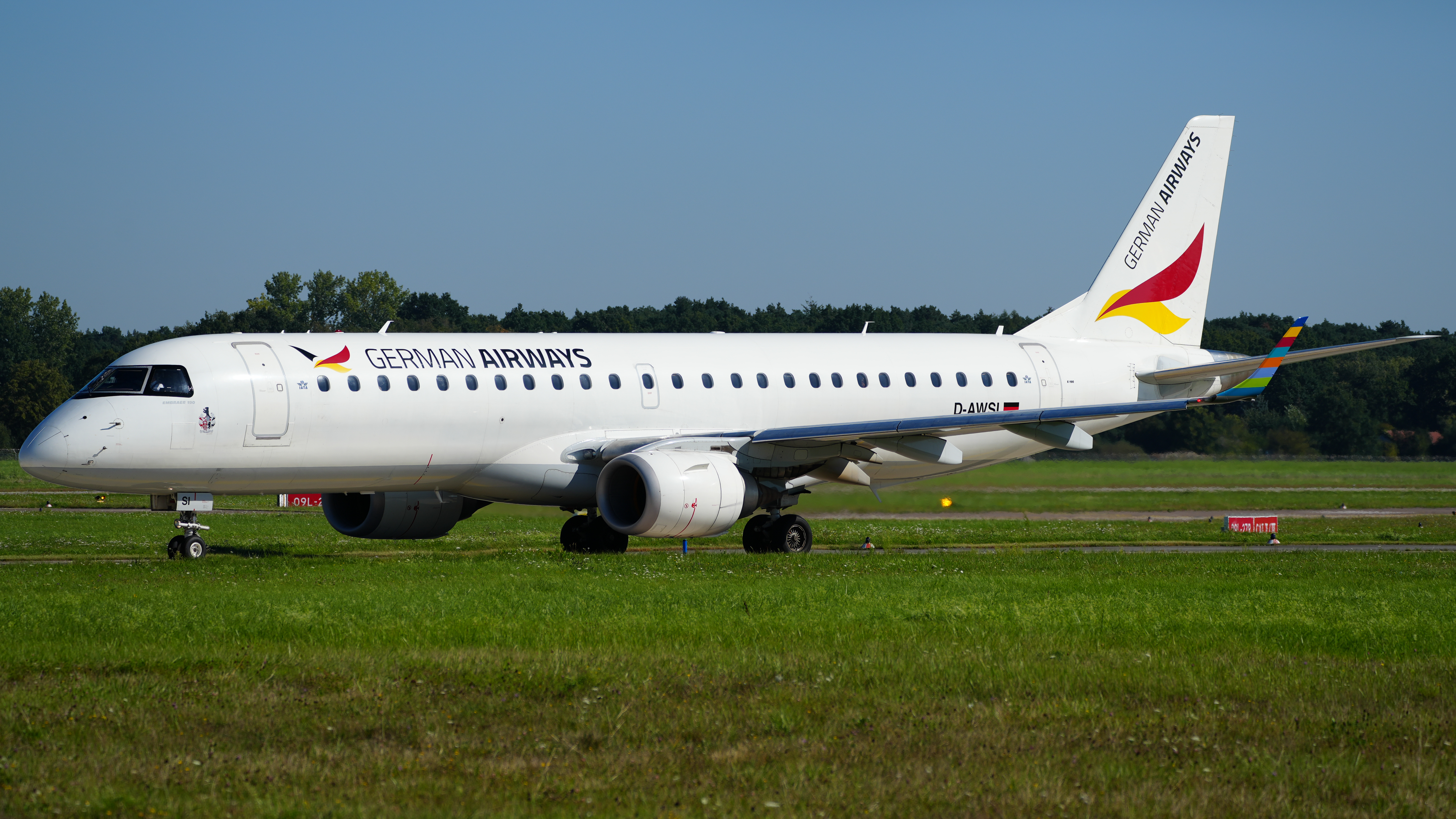
- Embraer E190 at Hannover-Langenhagen Airport
IATA	ICAO	Call sign
ZQ	GER	GERMAN EAGLE
- Founded: 1980 as LGW
- Ceased operations: 21 April 2020
- Fleet size: 9
- Parent company: Zeitfracht Group
- Headquarters: Cologne, Germany
- Website: germanairways.com

German Airways Fluggesellschaft GmbH, operating as German Airways and formerly named Luftfahrtgesellschaft Walter (LGW), was a German regional airline brand headquartered in Cologne.

Originally LGW was an independent provider of scheduled and chartered low-volume passenger flights. After years of cooperation with Air Berlin, it eventually became a subsidiary in 2017. After the collapse of Air Berlin it was purchased by Lufthansa in October 2017 and became a unit of the group's low-cost carrier Eurowings. Zeitfracht Group completed the purchase of LGW from Lufthansa on 1 April 2019 and renamed it German Airways in late 2020. The contract with Eurowings was terminated in April 2020 and LGW filed for insolvency.

== History ==
=== LGW-Luftfahrtgesellschaft Walter ===
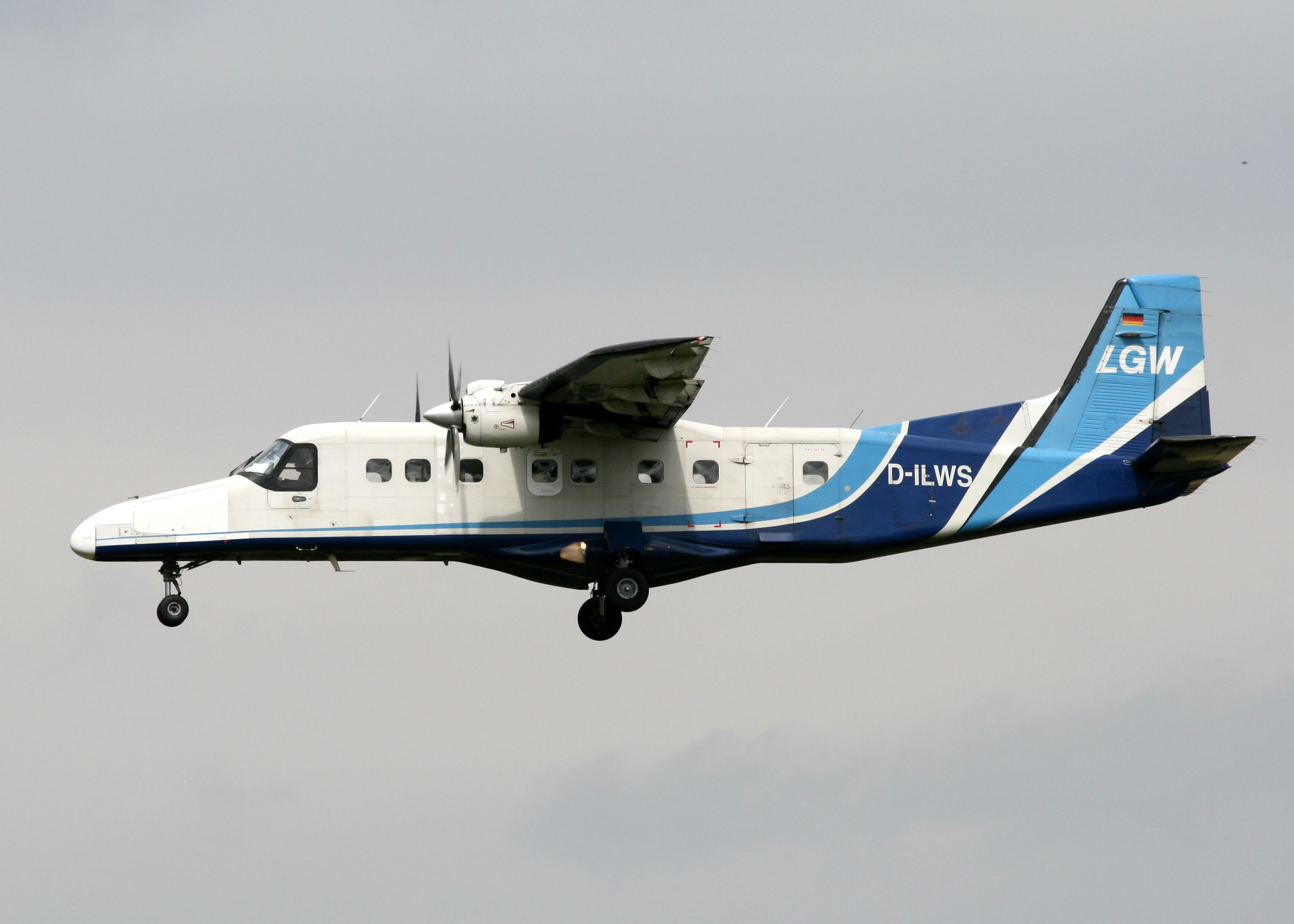
A Dornier 228 in 2004

Luftfahrtgesellschaft Walter GmbH was founded in 1980 by Bernd Walter, the owner of a flying school at Dortmund Airport. Initially, LGW offered on-demand charter and air taxi services. In 1992 launched a network of scheduled domestic flights which included Dortmund, Erfurt, Hamburg, and seasonal Rostock and Sylt/Westerland. At that time, it had 25 employees and the Dornier 228, with its capacity of 19 passengers, was the largest airliner in its fleet.

By the first half of 2000s, Berlin, Cologne-Bonn, Dusseldorf, Hamburg, Hanover, Leipzig, Nurnberg and Stuttgart had also joined the network.

=== Partnership with Air Berlin ===
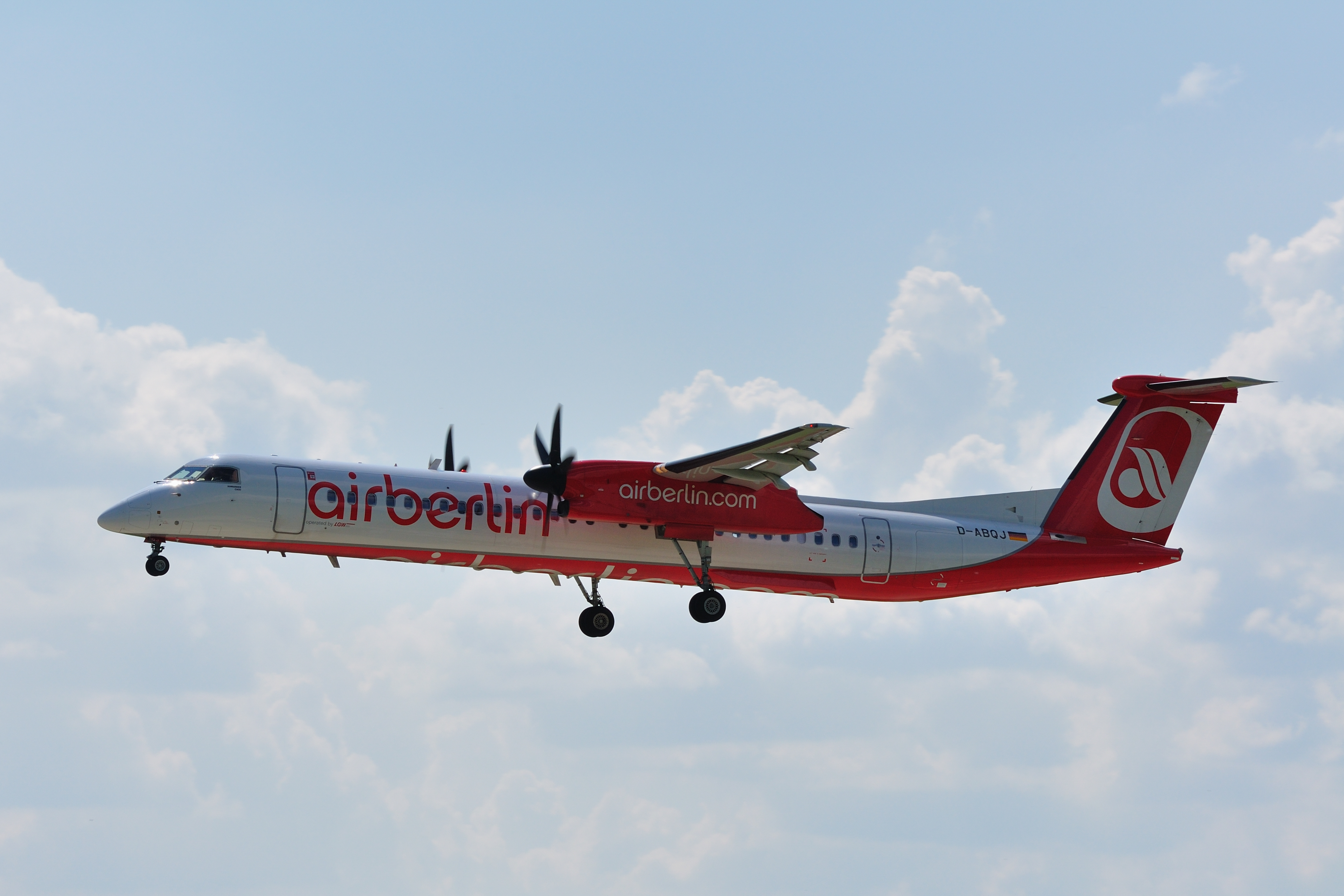
A De Havilland Dash 8-400 operated by LGW for Air Berlin in 2011

In 2007, LGW entered into a partnership with Air Berlin, which at the time was the second largest German airline. Effective 12 October of that year, LGW flights to Düsseldorf Airport and Berlin Tegel Airport were sold via the Air Berlin booking website. In 2008, Air Berlin added the De Havilland Dash 8-400 to the regional partner fleet. The ten aircraft of that type were leased to LGW and operated on regional routes.

Subsequently, LGW discontinued its own corporate identity. It no longer offered charter services, but only operated scheduled flights on behalf of Air Berlin, using Air Berlin flight numbers and brand. The website lgw.de was shut down and replaced with a redirect to airberlin.com. On 2 March 2009, Air Berlin notified the Federal Cartel Office that it would become the controlling shareholder of LGW.

As LGW staff did not have a collective agreement, salaries were considerably lower than at Air Berlin. To cut costs, Air Berlin transferred a large number of its staff to LGW (especially those whose fixed-term contracts had expired). By the end of 2011, LGW had 110 employees. By early 2013, they had grown to 480. Since that year, LGW also employed jet pilots, as a number of Embraer 190 aircraft were transferred to the airline from Niki (another Air Berlin subsidiary), the first of which arrived on 14 March and left the fleet in November 2013. By spring 2015, LGW increased their fleet of De Havilland Dash 8-400s from 12 to 17. In May 2017, Air Berlin announced plans to buy Luftfahrtgesellschaft Walter outright, having held a controlling stake since 2009.

=== From Lufthansa to Eurowings ===
Lufthansa bought LGW in 2017 as part of Air Berlin's bankruptcy proceedings. After Air Berlin ceased operations on 27 October 2017, LGW started wetlease operations for Eurowings, taking over parts of the wetlease agreement previously provided by its parent for the Lufthansa subsidiary. In addition to its existing fleet of Dash 8-Q400 aircraft, it received 13 Airbus A320-family aircraft and started hiring crews in November 2017. The acquisition was closed in January 2018 after receiving approval from the European Commission on 21 December 2017. In late 2018, all LGW operated Airbus A320s were transferred to other airlines within the Eurowings pertnership.

=== Sale to Zeitfracht Group and rebranding ===
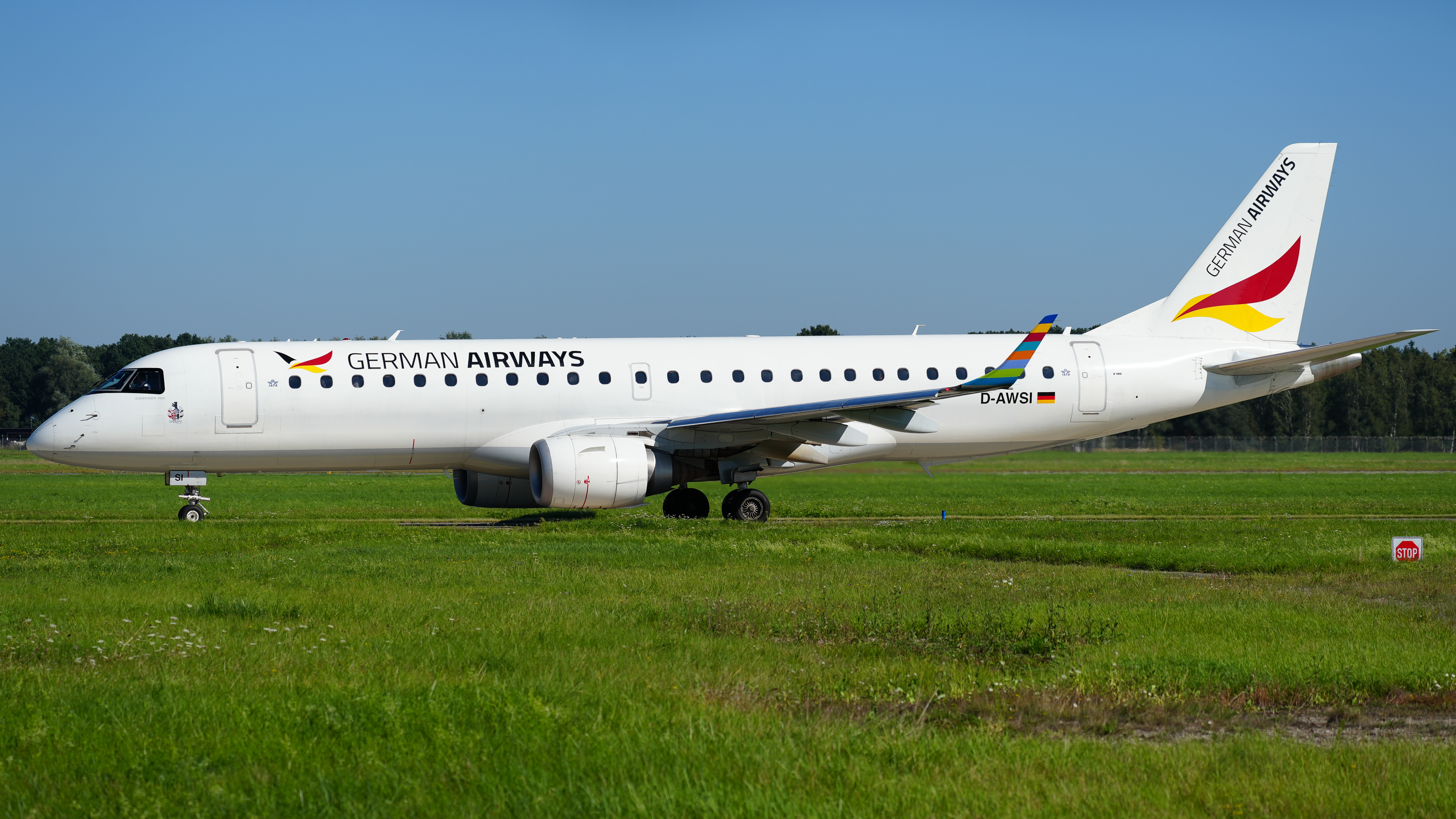
German Airways Embraer 190

In January 2019, it was reported that Lufthansa planned to sell LGW to Zeitfracht, which already owned German ACMI and charter airline German Airways (formerly named WDL Aviation). Zeitfracht had already purchased parts of Air Berlin's maintenance division. The deal was completed on 1 April 2019, following the approval of supervisory authorities and the fulfillment of customary conditions. The takeover also marked the beginning of a longer-term lease agreement between LGW and Eurowings. In May, LGW announced it would replace all of its De Havilland Dash 8-400s with newer Embraer 190s from late 2019. These aircraft would be operated on Eurowings behalf as part of a long-term lease.

In March 2020, Zeitfracht announced a rebranding for LGW as German Airways operating within the German Airways brand alongside sister company WDL Aviation. In April, the company filed for insolvency with plans to restructure due to the cancellation of Eurowings' wetlease contract for their entire Bombardier DHC-8-400 fleet in the wake of the COVID-19 pandemic. All flight operations were stopped on the 22 April 2020. The former sister company German Regional Airlines continues to operate using German Airways brand.

== Destinations ==
As of March 2026, German Airways' main wet lease customer was KLM Cityhopper; it also operated feeder services for Condor.

== Fleet ==
=== Current fleet ===
As of March 2026, German Airways operates the following aircraft:

Aircraft type	In Service	Orders	Passengers				Remarks
Aircraft type	In Service	Orders	C	Y+	Y	Total	Remarks
Embraer 190	9	0	—	12	88	100	
Total	9	0					

=== Former fleet ===
Previously, LGW operated the following aircraft types under its own brand or on behalf of other airlines:

Aircraft type	Introduced	Phased-out	Remarks
Airbus A319-100	2017	2018	Operated for and returned to Eurowings
Airbus A320-200	2017	2018	Operated for and returned to Eurowings
Britten-Norman Islander		1999	
Cessna 404 Titan		1997	
Dornier 228		2008	
Bombardier DHC-8-400	2008	2020	Operated for Air Berlin and Eurowings.
Embraer 190	2013	2013	Taken over from and returned to Niki on behalf of Air Berlin

== See also ==
- List of defunct airlines of Germany
- German Regional Airlines (currently operating under the German Airways brand)
