= Mönchengladbach Airport =

Airport in Germany

Mönchengladbach Airport Flughafen Mönchengladbach
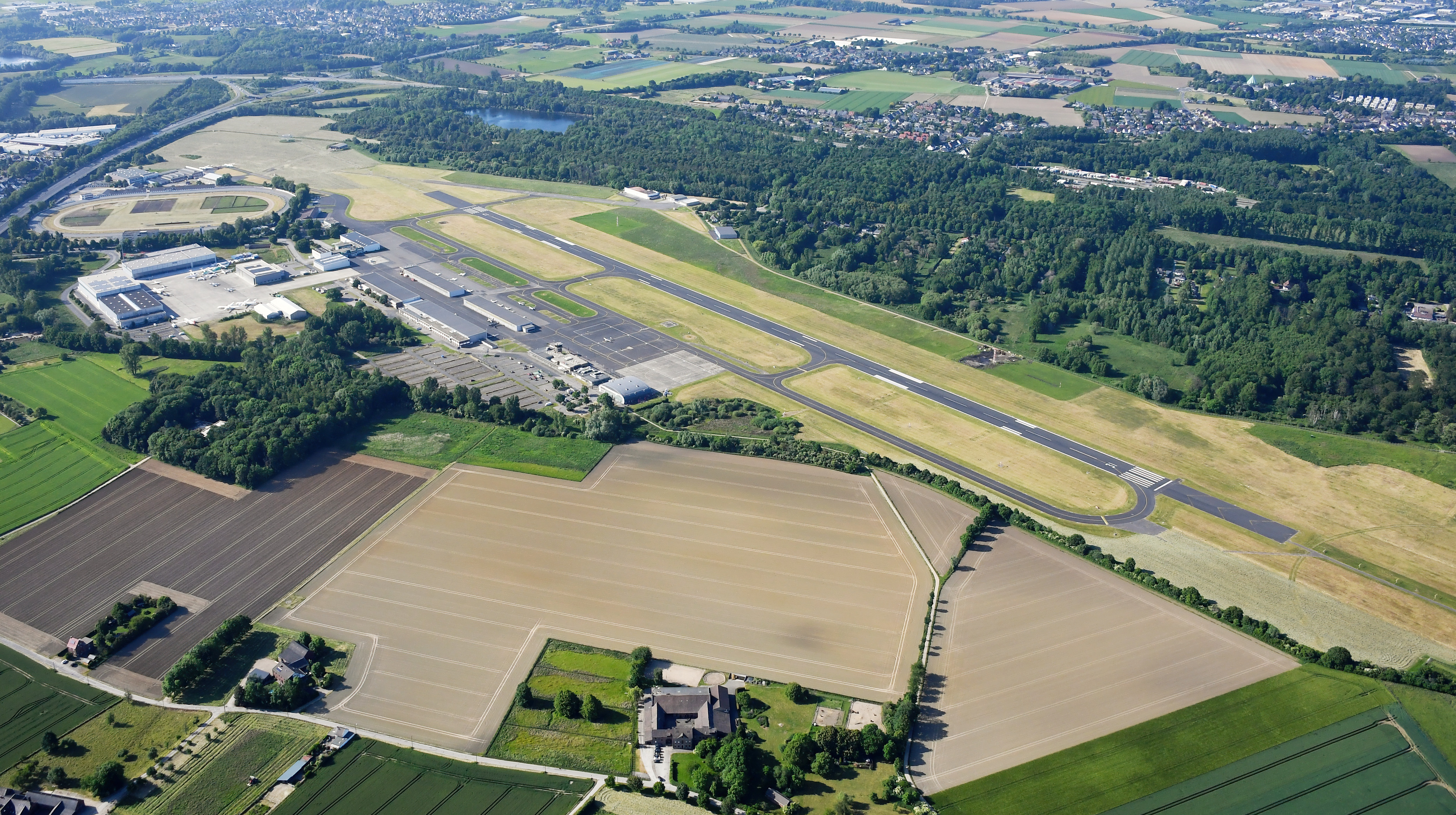
- IATA: MGL; ICAO: EDLN

Summary
- Airport type: Public
- Operator: Düsseldorf Airport
- Serves: Mönchengladbach, Germany
- Elevation AMSL: 125 ft / 38 m
- Coordinates: 51°13′49″N 006°30′16″E
- Website: mgl.de

Map
- Location of airport in Germany

Runways
Direction	Length		Surface
Direction	m	ft	Surface
13/31	1,200	3,937	Asphalt

Statistics (2022)
- Passengers: 33,842 ▼-12,9%
- Aircraft movements: 46,644 ▼-1,2%
- Cargo (metric tons): 2 ▼-70,5%
- Sources: Statistics at ADV., AIP at German air traffic control.

Mönchengladbach Airport (German: Verkehrslandeplatz Mönchengladbach, formerly Düsseldorf Mönchengladbach Airport, IATA: MGL, ICAO: EDLN) is a small regional airport located 4.4 km (2.7 mi) northeast of Mönchengladbach and 15.2 km (9.4 mi) west of Düsseldorf. It is co-owned by the company which also runs Düsseldorf Airport (70%) and the local utility company NVV AG (30%).

== History ==
The British Army of the Rhine undertook an exercise in 1955, in accord with the then NATO-Strategy of quick reaction. They built a basic 'field-made' airfield on the grass-covered area for an air-landing-exercise on this site. On finishing this exercise, the British Army of the Rhine handed the area over to the Mayor of Mönchengladbach for use as an airfield. The airfield was taken into service as a small airstrip for gliders. A hangar was built in 1957, and the next year a control tower and passenger terminal were constructed. The construction of the 1,200 m (3,937 ft) runway that is still used today began in 1970, and it was completed in 1973.

From 1996 until 2002, the Belgian airline VLM operated direct services to London City Airport with Fokker 50 aeroplanes providing up to 24 weekly flights in each direction. From 1996 to 1999, the British Airline Debonair operated services to London Luton Airport, and when Debonair was put into administration, the services were taken over by European Air Express who also operated services to Munich and Sylt/Westerland until the airline ceased operations in 2007.

In 2016, the airport underwent a rebranding and changed its name from Düsseldorf Mönchengladbach Airport to just Mönchengladbach Airport and also changed its corporate design to match the new one of its majority shareholder Düsseldorf Airport.

== Airlines and destinations ==
Starting on 6 November 2023 Franconia Air Service offers domestic scheduled flights to Nuremberg Airport. The airport is otherwise dominated by general aviation. Additionally, there are few business-charter passenger flights. The next major international airport is Düsseldorf Airport only 20 kilometres (12 mi) away to the east.

== See also ==
- Transport in Germany
- List of airports in Germany
