= Air Lipsia =

German regional airline

IATA	ICAO	Call sign
W2	-	-
- Founded: 2010
- Operating bases: Leipzig/Halle Airport
- Headquarters: Schkeuditz, Germany
- Key people: Günter Karch (CEO)

Air Lipsia was a German virtual airline headquartered and based at Leipzig/Halle Airport.

== History ==
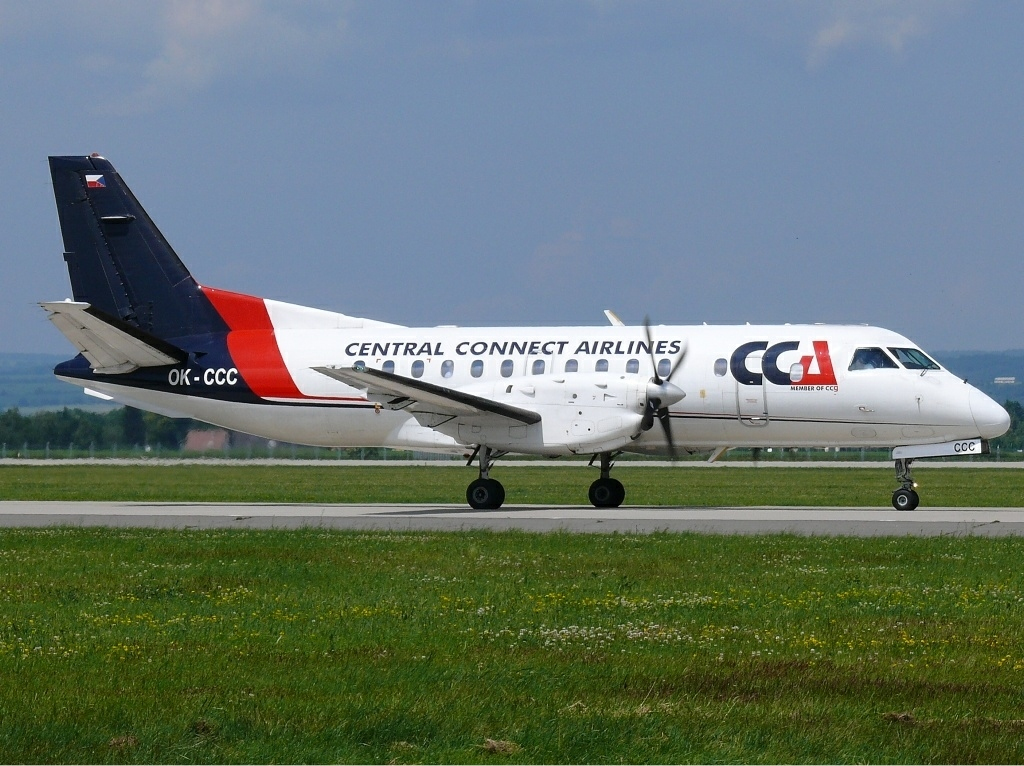
Central Connect Airlines Saab 340B operated the first flights

The airline commenced operations on 31 October 2010 with flights to Brussels and Prague operated by contractor Central Connect Airlines. The name Air Lipsia came from the old Latin and Italian name for Leipzig. As of October 2010, services to other destinations such as London were planned with a leased Boeing 737-500.

The route to Prague was terminated less than a year later, by 10 June 2011, due to low passenger numbers while the service to Brussels was sent into hiatus. According to the schedule of Leipzig/Halle Airport, Air Lipsia didn't provide scheduled traffic anymore as of November 2013 with no other established sources regarding the whereabouts of the airline to be found.

== Destinations ==
Air Lipsia marketed the following scheduled destinations operated by Central Connect Airlines on their behalf:

- Brussels - Brussels Airport
- Leipzig/Halle (Saale) - Leipzig/Halle Airport base
- Prague - Prague Airport

== Fleet ==
As of November 2010 the Air Lipsia fleet consisted of one Saab 340 aircraft operated by Central Connect Airlines, with 33 seats. As of December 2013, Central Connect Airlines didn't operate for Air Lipsia anymore.
