= Eastwest Airlines (Germany) =

German regional airline

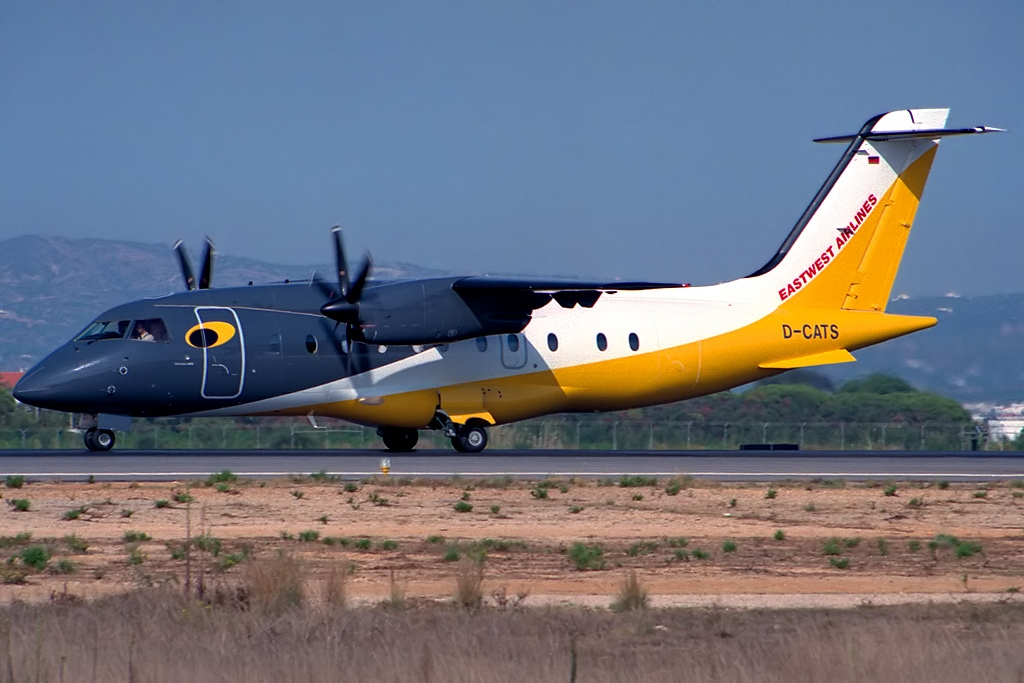
- Dornier Do.328-100
IATA	ICAO	Call sign
5D	EWT	-
- Founded: August 1993
- Commenced operations: May 1994
- Ceased operations: June 1995
- Hubs: Erfurt-Weimar Airport
- Fleet size: 1
- Employees: 25 in 1994

Eastwest Airlines GmbH was a German regional airline based out of Erfurt. It is not related to the Australian carrier.

== History ==
Eastwest Airlines was founded in August 1993. After receiving its first aircraft, the company commenced operations on May 10, 1994. Eastwest Airlines was the first German airline to introduce a Dornier 328, connecting the airports of Erfurt and Munich. In addition, there were daily flights from Frankfurt and weekly flights from Berlin-Tempelhof to Sylt. In the first four months after operations began, around 5,000 passengers were counted; 25 employees were working for Eastwest Airlines.

From January 9, 1995, flights operated five times a week between Berlin and Rotterdam, with the aim of attracting business travelers to this route. Shortly afterward, service to Florence (Italy) was also added, although flight operations fell short of economic expectations, forcing the airline to discontinue service entirely on June 2, 1995. The search for a new investor proved unsuccessful, and the company was ultimately foreclosed upon due to its debts.

== Fleet ==
A D-CATS registered Dornier 328

== See also ==
- List of Defunct airlines of Germany
