= Aviaction =

German charter airline (1969–1973)

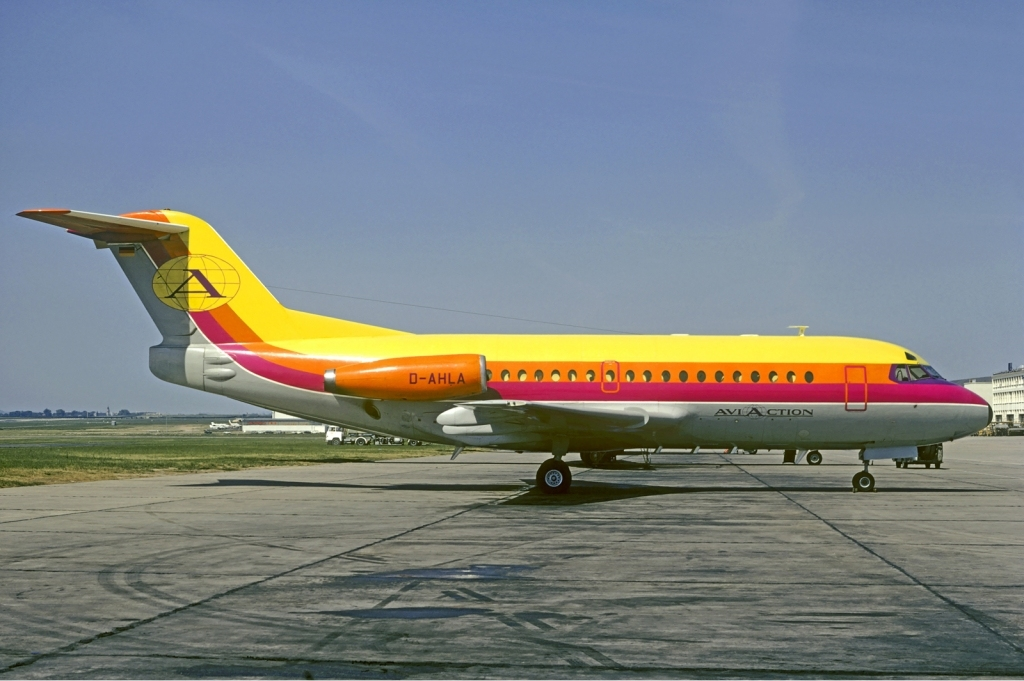
- Fokker F28-1000
IATA	ICAO	Call sign
-	HC	AVIACTION
- Founded: December 22 1969
- Commenced operations: February 26 1971
- Ceased operations: October 30 1973
- Fleet size: 3

Aviaction was a German based charter airline which operated from 1971 to 1973.

== History ==
Aviaction-Hanseatische Luftreederei GmbH was founded in Hamburg on December 22, 1969, by private investors. In the summer of 1970, the company ordered three Fokker F28-1000 jet aircraft, taking delivery of the first on February 26, 1971. The 65-seat jetliner was considered the ideal aircraft for serving short-to medium haul destinations not covered by the larger charter airlines. Aviaction commenced operations on March 28, 1971, with a charter flight from Hamburg to Palma de Mallorca. The air carrier received its two other Fokker F28s in April and July of that same year. At least one jetliner resulted registered to a certain Aviaction Kassel Flugtouristik GmbH. The Norwegian domestic airline Braathens S.A.F.E. was contracted to maintain the three aircraft.

The financial situation in the summer of 1973 led the company to seek new investors. The Danish charter airline Sterling Airways initially expressed interest in a takeover, particularly to gain a foothold in the German charter market, but ultimately did not proceed with the acquisition. Aviaction ceased operations at the end of the summer season, on October 30, 1973, because it could no longer meet its outstanding debts.

== Fleet ==
- 3 x Fokker F28-1000

== See also ==
- List of defunct airlines of Germany
