= General Air =

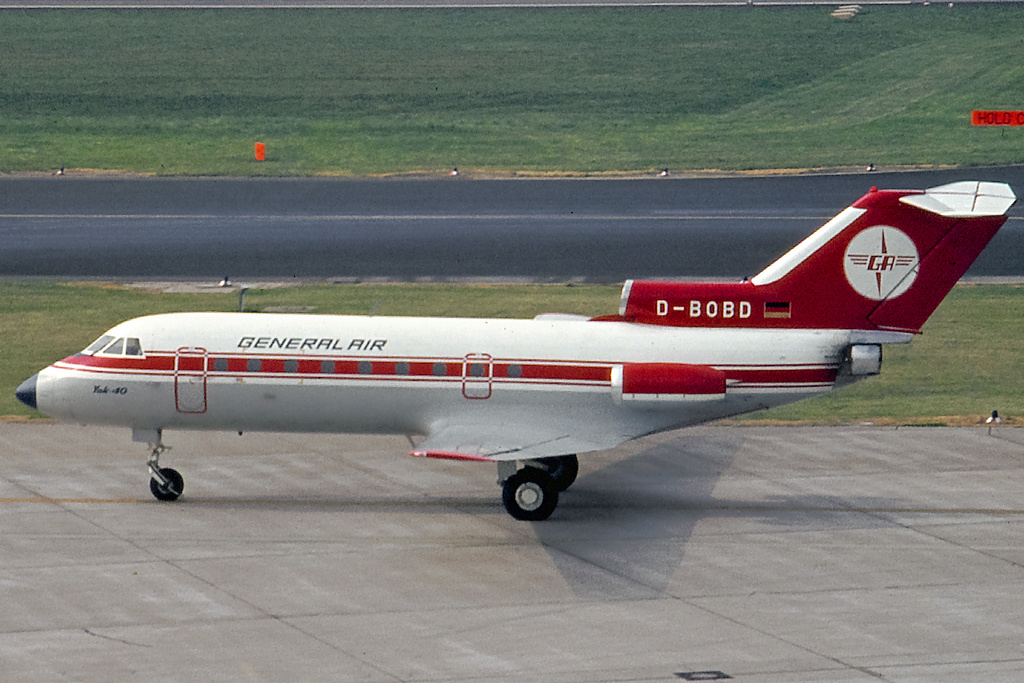
- Yakovlev Yak 40
IATA	ICAO	Call sign
-	GQ	-
- Founded: 1962
- Ceased operations: 1975

The name General Air was common to three different airlines, even if connected by a historical and operational thread.

== History ==
=== General Air GmbH & Co. K.G. ===
The air carrier was founded in 1962 as a charter and aerial work operator. Dornier Do.27 and Do.28 aircraft were used for the first operations. Initially General Air connected Hamburg-Fuhlsbüttel airport with the communities of Wangerooge, Helgoland, and Sylt with ad hoc flights. In 1967 the first DHC 6 was added to the fleet (later to become three in the fleet). This versatile 19-seat twin-engine aircraft was instrumental in opening the first scheduled routes in April 1968.

Subsequently, as business grew (especially seasonally), the company also purchased a Convair 440, which was essentially used on flights on behalf of Lufthansa. However, the growth plans were not accompanied by good financial results, and in May 1972, all scheduled flights were interrupted. The company then survived only with on-demand and charter flights until 1974, when it was completely reconstituted under the name Hadag Air.

=== General Air Nord ===
When the previous company discontinued its scheduled flights, some of the staff left and independently set up General Air Nord GmbH & Co. K.G. which restarted a handful of routes in the following month of July with the Convair 440. Very soon a little-known jetliner joined the fleet, the Soviet Yakovlev YAK-40s. Five more would be added later, becoming the Western World operator with the largest number of these aircraft. The network linked Saarbrücken with Düsseldorf, Frankfurt, Köln-Bonn, Munich, Düsseldorf with Bremen, Brussels and Nurnberg, and Nurnberg with Munich. To cope with the increased expenses in 1974 the airline secured additional investors but this was not enough to continue the flight activity beyond the first weeks of the year.

=== General Air Luftverkehrs ===
Some stubborn employees hastily set up General Air Luftverkehrs GmbH and continued some regular flights that had been interrupted. The fleet included some Yak 40s still in airworthy condition but the generous attempt was destined to a new failure. Flight activity continued for the rest of 1974 and until the end of the summer of 1975. Then, in October, the airline finally ceased operations. The Yak 40s were returned to the Soviet Union at the end of the year.

== Fleet ==
- Beechcraft King Air A90
- Convair CV-440
- de Havilland Canada DHC-6 Twin Otter
- Dornier Do 27
- Dornier Do 28
- HFB 320
- Yakovlev Yak 40

== See also ==
List of defunct airlines of Germany
