= Triple Alpha Luftfahrtgesellschaft =

IATA	ICAO	Call sign
3A	CLU	CAROLUS
- Founded: 1995
- Ceased operations: 2011
- Operating bases: Düsseldorf Airport
- Fleet size: 16
- Destinations: charter
- Parent company: Ocean Sky
- Headquarters: Düsseldorf, Germany
- Employees: 60

Triple Alpha Luftfahrtgesellschaft GmbH was a German charter airline and aircraft management company headquartered in Düsseldorf and based at Düsseldorf Airport. Since 2009, it had been a subsidiary of Ocean Sky.

== History ==
Hans Pfeiffer and Erik Scheidt, who both worked in overhaul and maintenance of Cessna T303 aircraft in Aachen, founded Avanti Aviation Aachen Luftfahrtgesellschaft in 1995. The newly established airline obtained its AOC in 1996 and started operations with two Cessna 421 aircraft, followed by its first jet aircraft, a Cessna Citation II a year later and the first turboprop aircraft, a Piper Cheyenne, in 1998.

Also in 1998, the airline was relocated to Düsseldorf and renamed Triple Alpha Luftfahrtgesellschaft, sometimes shortended to 3A.

In 2001, the first Cessna Citation CJ2 approved in Europe was delivered to Triple Alpha. In the same year, due to economic downturn following the September 11 attacks, the airline reduced its frequencies and was forced to store some of their aircraft and slow down expansion in the upcoming years.

In 2005, a Cessna Citation V was registered in France and based in Paris. A year later, Triple Alpha which then operated a fleet of nine Cessna Citation aircraft, ordered a larger Airbus A319CJ. Additionally, the fleet was expanded in the following years with Challenger 300, Bombardier Global 7000 and Cessna Citation Mustang mid- and long-range aircraft.

In September 2009, business jet operator Ocean Sky acquired a 60 percent stake in Triple Alpha, this was increased to 80 percent a year later. Also during 2010 and 2011, the airline received their first two IAI Astra aircraft.

However, in July 2011, Triple Alpha filed for insolvency and was put under control of an administrator appointed by a German court.

== Destinations ==
Triple Alpha did not offer scheduled services but operated charter, general aviation, business, cargo, flight school, air ambulance, aerial evacuation and organ transport services.

== Fleet ==
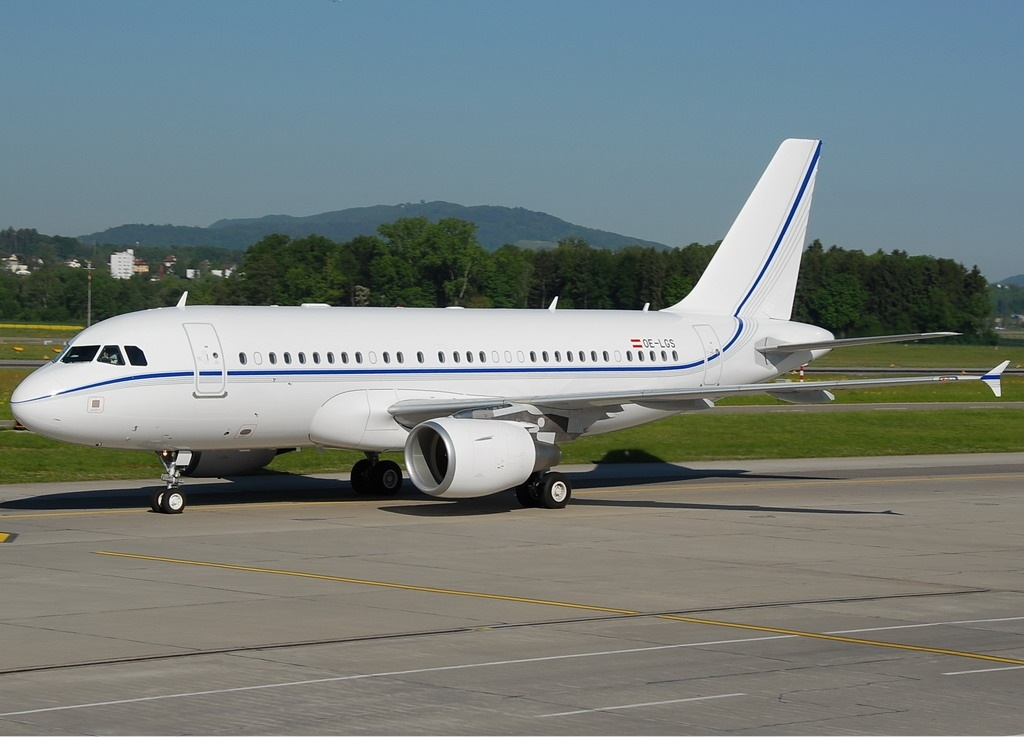
Triple Alpha Airbus A319CJ

The Triple Alpha fleet consisted of the following aircraft:

- 1 Airbus A319CJ
- 1 Bombardier Challenger 300
- 1 Bombardier Global 7000
- 2 Cessna Citation II
- 2 Cessna Citation V
- 8 Cessna Citation CJ2
- 1 Cessna Citation Mustang
