= Atlantis (Germany) =

German charter airline (1966–1972)

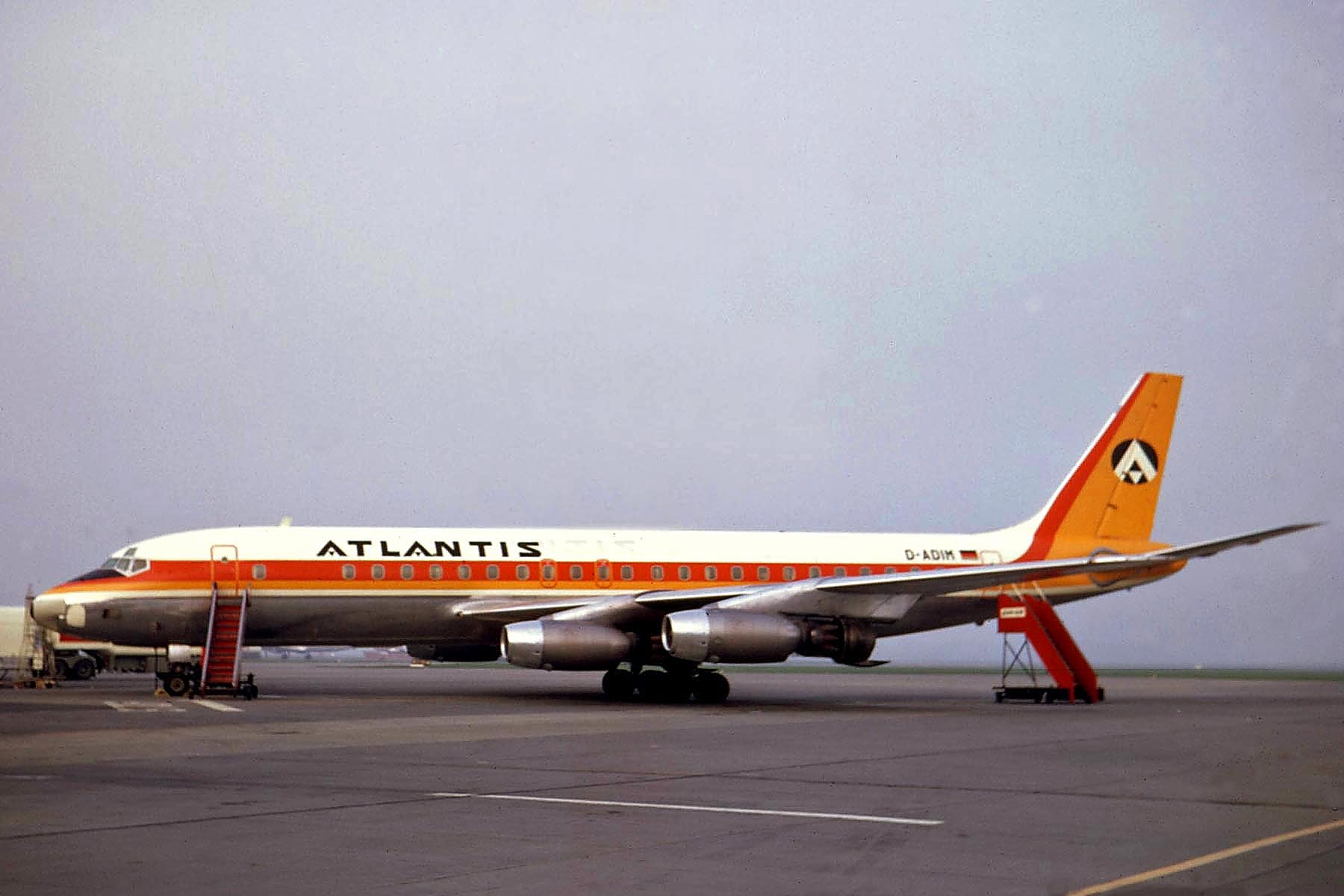
- Douglas DC-8
IATA	ICAO	Call sign
-	NO	ATLANTIS
- Founded: July 1965 (as Nordseeflug)
- Commenced operations: August 1966 (as Nordseeflug)
- Ceased operations: October 1972 (as Atlantis)
- Operating bases: Frankfurt Airport
- Fleet size: 10
- Destinations: charter
- Headquarters: Stuttgart, Germany

Atlantis was a German charter airline based at Frankfurt Airport.

== History ==
The airline was established in 1965 as Nordseeflug Sylter Lufttransport and started seasonal scheduled services in August of the following year with a Douglas DC-3 from Hamburg to Westerland.

In April 1968 it was renamed Atlantis and received a permit from the Civil Aeronautics Board to operate transatlantic inclusive-tour flights to the United States with Douglas DC-8. Atlantis also operated affinity group charter flights and charter flights to destinations in the Mediterranean with McDonnell Douglas DC-9.

Despite the airline's cooperation with several tour operators it ceased operations on 19 October 1972 due to an uncertain financial perspective.

== Fleet ==
Atlantis operated the following aircraft during its existence:

- 1 Douglas DC-3
- 1 Douglas DC-7
- 5 Douglas DC-8
- 3 Douglas DC-9
