= OFD-Ostfriesischer-Flug-Dienst =

Regional airline in Northern Germany

- Founded: 2011
- Commenced operations: 2011
- Ceased operations: January 2013
- Hubs: Emden
- Secondary hubs: Bremerhaven, Heligoland
- Destinations: 5
- Headquarters: Emden

OFD-Ostfriesischer-Flug-Dienst was a small regional airline based in Northern Germany which operated in the years 2011-2013.

== History ==
This small regional airline originated in 2011 from some of the assets of OLT-Ostfriesische GmbH at the same time this was merged into OLT Express Germany. OFD took over local routes to the North Sea islands, between Emden, Borkum, and Bremerhaven; and from Heide/Busum to Heligoland. Charter flights and aerial mapping were also carried out. Operations continued for about a couple of years, marked by a modest level of traffic until all flights ceased in early January 2013.

== Fleet ==
OFD fleet consisted of the following aircraft as of early 2013:

Aircraft type	Total	Remarks
BN.2 Islander	3	model 2B-26
Cessna 208B Caravan	1	
