= AOC (disambiguation) =

AOC, or Alexandria Ocasio-Cortez (born 1989), is an American politician and activist.

AOC or aoc may also refer to:

== Aeronautics ==
- Aeronautical operational control, a group of applications used for communication of an aircraft
- Air Operations Center, a command center operated by the United States Air Force
- Air officer commanding, a title in some air forces
- Air operator's certificate
- Aircraft Operating Company, a former British aerial photography company
- Aircraft Operations Center, a part of the U.S. NOAA
- Aviation Officer Candidate, a rank at the U.S. Navy Officer Candidate School
- Leipzig–Altenburg Airport (IATA code: AOC)

== Law ==
- Age of consent, the minimum age at which a person is legally competent to consent to sexual acts
- Appellation d'origine contrôlée, a protected designation of origin for French agricultural products
- Appellation d'origine contrôlée (Switzerland), a protected designation of origin for Swiss wines
- Articles of Confederation, the predecessor to the Constitution of the United States

== Organizations ==
- AOC International, formerly Admiral Overseas Corporation, an electronics company in Taiwan
- Adelaide Ornithologists Club, a club in Australia
- Akan Orthography Committee, a committee for the Akan language
- Portuguese: Aliança Operário-Camponesa or Worker–Peasant Alliance, a front of the Communist Party of Portugal
- Alliance of Civilizations, a United Nations anti-extremism organization
- Architect of the Capitol, a U.S. federal agency that maintains the United States Capitol Complex
- Army Ordnance Corps (United Kingdom), the predecessor of the Royal Army Ordnance Corps of the British Army
- Arts Orange County, an arts council in the United States
- Association of Colleges, an association in the United Kingdom
- Association of Old Crows, an electronic warfare defense organization in the United States
- American Olympic Committee, a former and colloquial name for the United States Olympic & Paralympic Committee
- Australian Olympic Committee
- Athabasca Oil Corporation

== Science and technology ==
- Active optical cable, a type of active cable which uses optical fiber
- Advice of Charge, a part of the mobile GSM services standard
- Antibody-oligonucleotide conjugate
- Axiom of choice, a concept in set theory

== Other uses ==
- Act of Contrition, a genre of Christian prayer
- Advent of Code, an annual set of computer programming challenges
- Anglican Orthodox Church, a Continuing Anglican denomination in the United States
- Archdiocese of Cincinnati, a Latin Archdiocese in the United States
- Atatürk Orman Çiftliği, a public recreational farming area in Turkey
- Attestation of Compliance, a component of the self-assessment questionnaire in the Payment Card Industry Data Security Standard
- Great Lakes Areas of Concern, designated portions of the Great Lakes Basin with environmental degradation issues
- Hyrule Warriors: Age of Calamity, a 2020 video game released for the Nintendo Switch
- Pemon language (ISO 639-3 code: aoc)

== See also ==
- AOC3, a human gene
