= Central Connect Airlines =

Airline based in Ostrava, Czech Republic

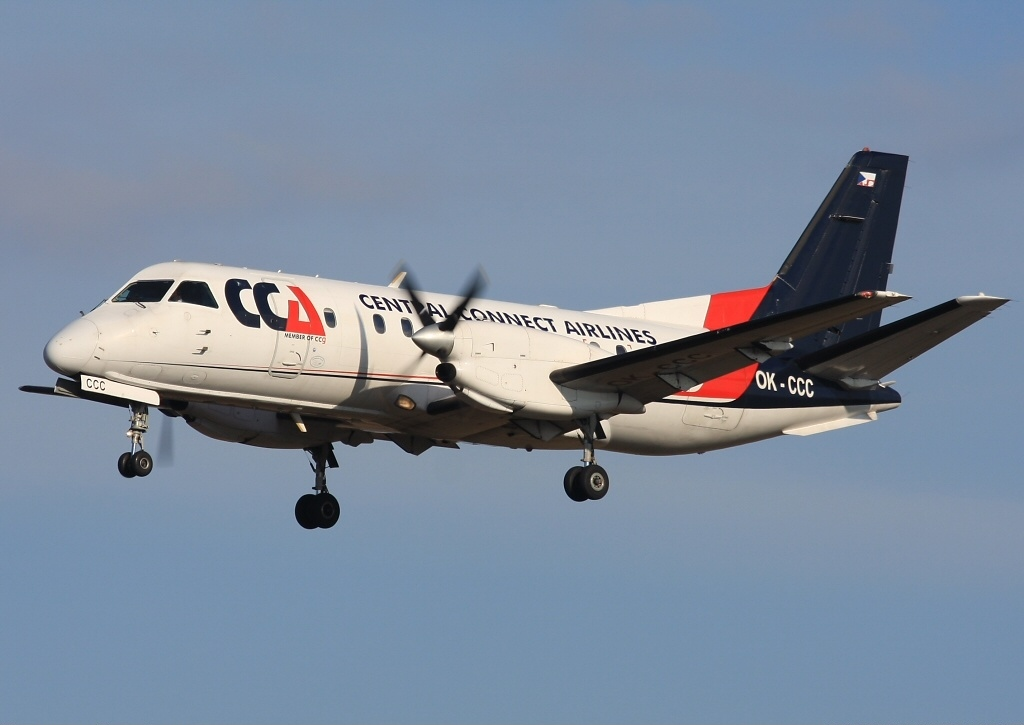
- Saab 340B
| IATA | ICAO | Call sign |
|---|---|---|
| 3B | JBR | JOBAIR |
- Founded: 2005
- Ceased operations: 2014
- Hubs: Leoš Janáček Airport Ostrava
- Fleet size: 2
- Parent company: Central Connect Group
- Headquarters: Ostrava, Czech Republic
- Website: flycca.cz

Central Connect Airlines was an airline based in Ostrava, Czech Republic. It operated leasing and charter services. Its main base was Leoš Janáček Airport Ostrava.

== History ==
The airline was established in 2005, was wholly owned by the Central Connect Group (via Job Air subsidiary) and had 110 employees as of December 2008. The airline flew routes from Prague to Berlin, Stuttgart, Hanover, Ljubljana, Kraków and Zagreb on behalf of Czech Airlines.

In February 2012 the airline retired their last operational Saab 340F. At the end of March the above mentioned routes were taken over by Czech Airlines. Because of financial difficulties on the following 18 June Central Connect Airlines ceased operations but there were plans to reorganize the company.

As of December 2013 the air carrier operated leasing and charter services but did not resume the routes for Czech Airlines. In June 2014 it was announced that Central Connect Airlines would cease all remaining operations on the 30th.

== Destinations ==
=== Operated for Air100 ===
Finland

- Helsinki – Helsinki Airport (ended 30 June 2014)
- Pori – Pori Airport (ended 30 June 2014)

=== Operated in partnership with Czech Airlines ===
Central Connect Airlines served the following destinations as of 24 February 2012:

Czech Republic

- Ostrava – Leoš Janáček Airport Ostrava base (ceased 18 June 2012)
- Prague – Prague Ruzyně Airport (ceased 18 June 2012)

Germany

- Berlin – Berlin Tegel Airport (ceased 18 June 2012)
- Hannover Airport (ceased 18 June 2012)
- Stuttgart Airport (ceased 18 June 2012)

Slovenia

- Ljubljana – Ljubljana Jože Pučnik Airport (ceased 18 June 2012)

Poland

- Kraków – John Paul II International Airport (ceased 18 June 2012)
- Poznań – Poznań-Ławica Airport (ceased 18 June 2012)

Croatia

- Zagreb – Zagreb Airport (ceased 18 June 2012)

== Fleet ==
The Central Connect Airlines fleet included the following aircraft (as of 1 December 2013):

- 2 Saab 340B
