= Südavia =

German regional airline

IATA	ICAO	Call sign
FV	VXY	SUDAVIA
- Founded: June 1984
- Commenced operations: August 1984
- Ceased operations: April 1990
- Headquarters: Munich, Germany

Südavia was a German regional airline based in Munich operating in the years 1984-1990.

== History ==
In 1984 an air-taxi company named BN Rent-a-Plane was founded in Munich. On 14 June 1984 the corporate name was changed to Südavia Fluggesellschaft mbH and scheduled services between Munich and Saarbrücken using Beech 90 aircraft were started in the month of August. Further operations in 1984 included regular flights to Verona (Italy). In 1986 schedules to Pisa begun and the fleet was expanded to include the larger Beech 200. At the end of 1987, the Dornier 228 was introduced and services to Strasbourg were begun.

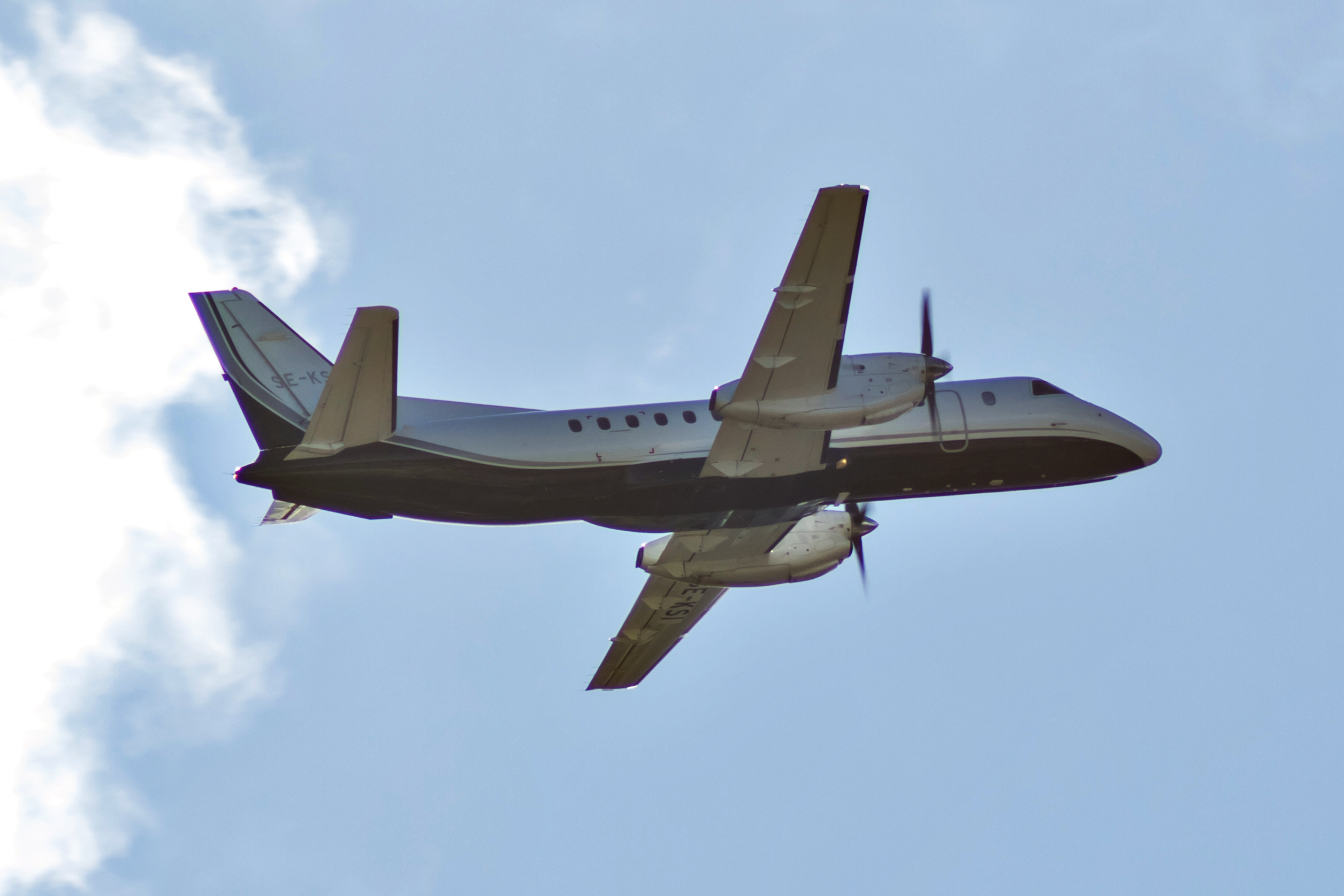
Saab 340

In 1987 the Beech 1900 was introduced and since this was the first pressurized aircraft in the fleet, it was used for the routes to Italy. In February 1988, Südavia began to work closely with DLT and this led to the introduction of the Embraer EMB 120 Brasilia. The rapid expansion of Südavia brought financial problems and some routes were taken over by DLT. It was during this time that DLT tried to take over Südavia but the deal failed and a group of investors (Air Exel) was found that took over 43,9% of the company and the Brasilias were replaced by Saab 340. But by April 1990 the mounting debt and financial troubles led to the revocation of the license and operations were suspended.

== Destinations in 1989 ==
- Toulouse (Blagnac)
- Graz (Thalerhof)
- Genoa (Cristoforo Colombo)
- Verona (Villafranca)
- Pisa (Galileo Galilei)
- Saarbrücken (Ensheim)

== Fleet ==
During its existence, Südavia operated the following aircraft:

- 3 x Beechcraft 1900
- 1 x Dornier 228
- 2 x Embraer EMB-120
- 2 x Saab 340
