= RFG – Regionalflug =

Regionalflug
IATA	ICAO	Call sign
VG	RFG	RFG
- Founded: 1976
- Ceased operations: 1993
- Hubs: Dortmund Airport, Paderborn/Lippstadt Airport
- Fleet size: 8

RFG – Regionalflug was founded in 1976 by the two pilots Heinrich Hiby and Reinhard Santner. The Dortmund-based company, initially named Reise- und Industrieflug (Travel and Industrial Flight), operated air taxi and charter flights, using a rented Piper Navajo and a Cessna 414. Two years later, they took over sightseeing flights and the summer seaside resort service from another carrier Aerowest which had previously employed the pilots for RFG.

== Finances ==
New financial resources and increased business expertise were essential for the company's survival. Consequently, Heinrich Hiby sold his shares to the Gypsum manufacturer Albrecht Knauf and left the company. In December 1978, thanks to a special permit, regular flight operations from Dortmund Airport commenced. Using a singular Cessna 404 the route was originally a one way flight from Dortmund to Munich, but later the route was soon served five times daily in both directions. By 1982, RFG had achieved a seat load factor of approximately 70%. In April 1981, a connection to Stuttgart was established with another Cessna 404; however, the crash of an aircraft and poor passenger numbers quickly led to the discontinuation of this new route. The newly added international connections to Klagenfurt and Salzburg also proved unprofitable, as they could not be operated economically with the pricing structure stipulated by the Austrian authorities.

In 1982, Flight Travel Service , a company based out of Paderborn which was 49 percent owned by Nixdorf and other industrial companies, approached RFG. Together, they signed a contract to operate two Cessna 404s on the Paderborn –Munich and Paderborn– Frankfurt routes. Later that same year, they acquired the first of what would become six Swearingen Metroliner IIs, which carried 32,700 passengers in 1984. The airline was doing fairly well during this time and in 1985 began to lease some ATR 42.

== Merger ==
RFG and NFD merged in the year 1992 to form Eurowings. Eurowings initially used a fleet of 26 aircraft which were mostly ATR aircraft The airline operated 8 ATR 42 aircraft when it merged with Nurneberger Flugdiesnt.

=== Historical Fleet ===
Regional Flug historically flew the following aircraft types

- Cessna 404
- Cessna 414
- Dornier 228
- Fairchild Swearingen Metro
