= German Wings =

German airline

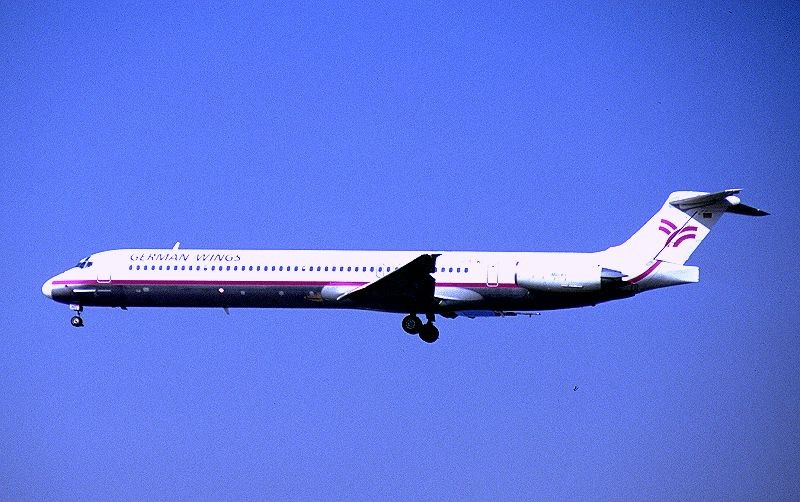
- McDonnell Douglas MD-83
IATA	ICAO	Call sign
PW	KFK	GERMAN WINGS
- Founded: 1986
- Commenced operations: April 1989
- Ceased operations: April 1990
- Operating bases: Munich Airport
- Fleet size: 9
- Destinations: domestic and international
- Headquarters: Haar, Germany

German Wings was a scheduled German airline that operated for one year between 1989 and 1990. The company slogan was German: Die Business-Line, The Business Line.

== History ==
The history of German Wings can be traced to 1983 and began as a small air taxi firm called Airflight. In 1986 the name was changed to German Wings and in April 1989 it commenced scheduled flights using MD-83 aircraft. This airline offered fewer seats per plane (114 instead of the normal 172). The main operating base was in Munich and from there it flew to Frankfurt, Cologne/Bonn, Hamburg and Paris.

German Wings was the first (and unsuccessful) attempt at attacking Lufthansa's domestic stronghold. The airline had all Business class service. Although the public supported German Wings from the beginning, the new airline was not granted enough slots at airports to operate profitably and by 1990 it was in serious financial problems. In April 1990 the airline halted flights and subsequently went bankrupt.

== Fleet ==
The German Wings fleet consisted of the following aircraft:

- 2 x McDonnell Douglas MD-82
- 7 x McDonnell Douglas MD-83
