= City-Air =

German regional airline

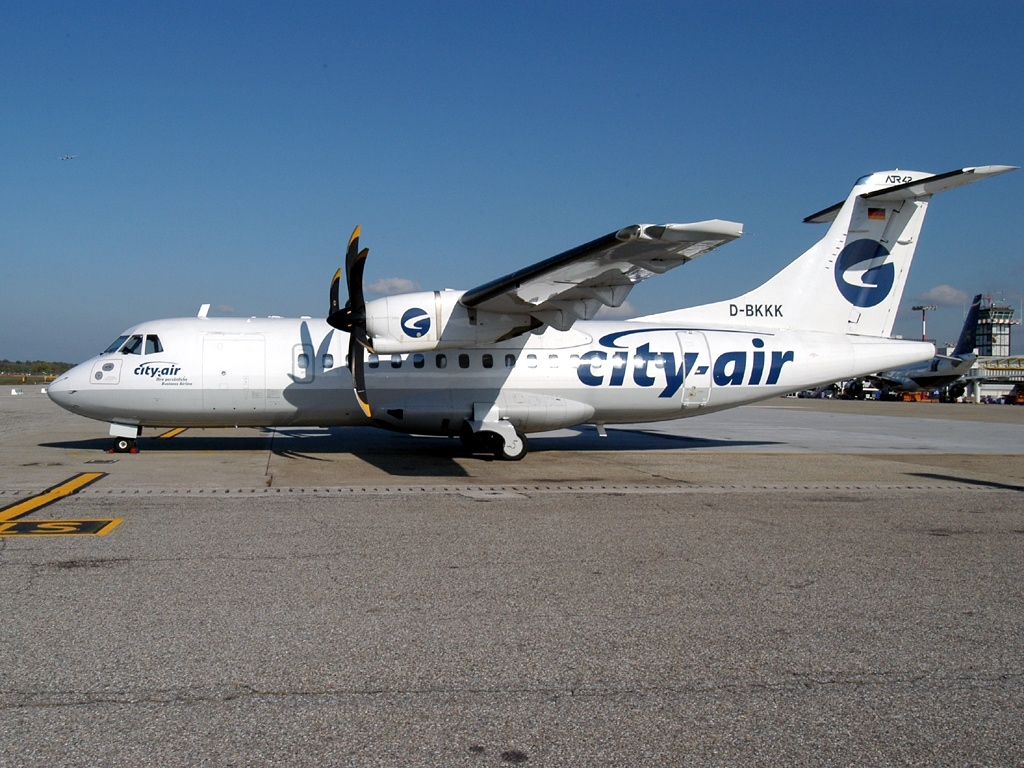
- ATR 42-500
IATA	ICAO	Call sign
6E	CIP	Cityways
- Founded: 1971 as Teuto Airways
- Commenced operations: 1971 as Teuto Airways
- Ceased operations: February 27, 2004
- Headquarters: Germany

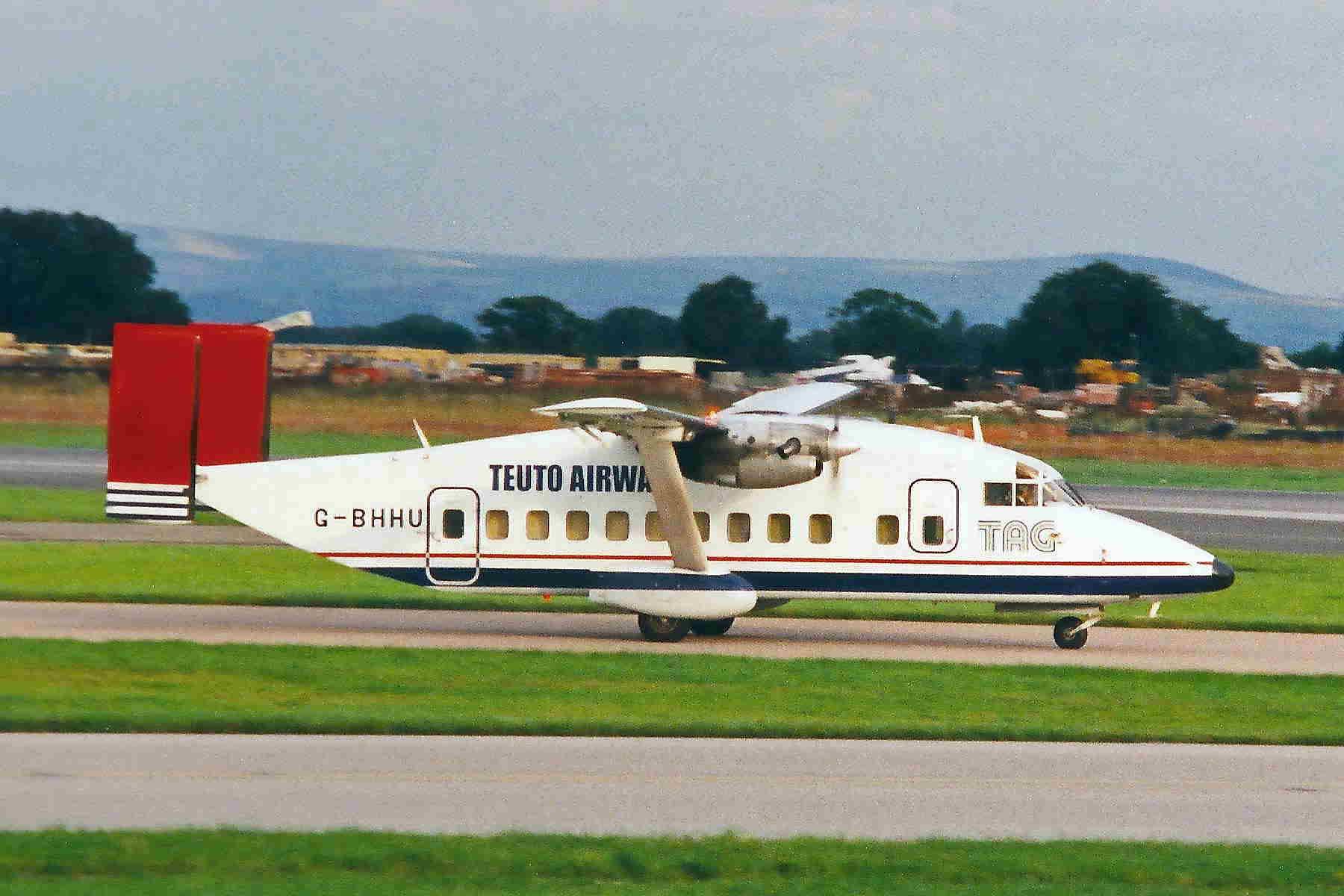
Short 330 in August 1998

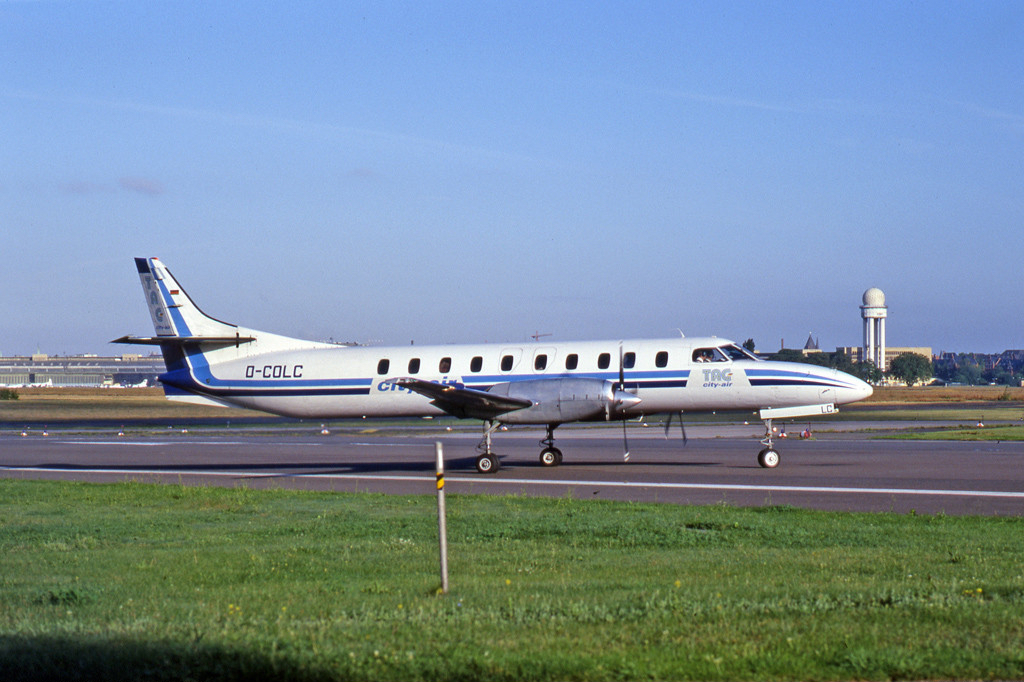
Metroliner

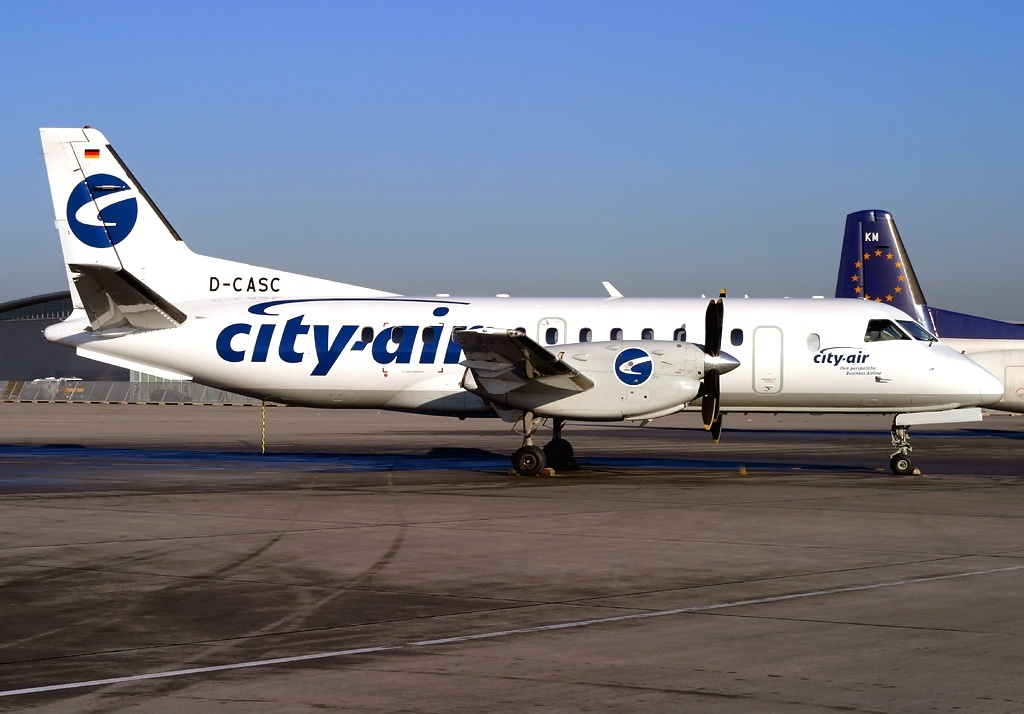
Saab 340B

City-Air was an airline based in Germany. The airline's origins date back to the 1970s. Teuto Airways was founded in 1971 to operate ad hoc flights with light aircraft. Actual airline operations began in 1997 with Short 330s adapted for cargo transport.

In March 2000, the name was changed to TAG City-Air, and some Metroliners, also for passenger transport, entered service in the fleet.

The evolution was rapid and after a further name change - City-Air - the fleet was enriched with more capacious aircraft: Saab 340s and an ATR 42-500 on domestic routes within Germany and on several international routes to Austria, Denmark, Hungary and Switzerland. Unfortunately the plans set up proved too ambitious and the airline suspended operations in February 2004 and filed for insolvency.
