= German Regional Airlines =

German charter airline

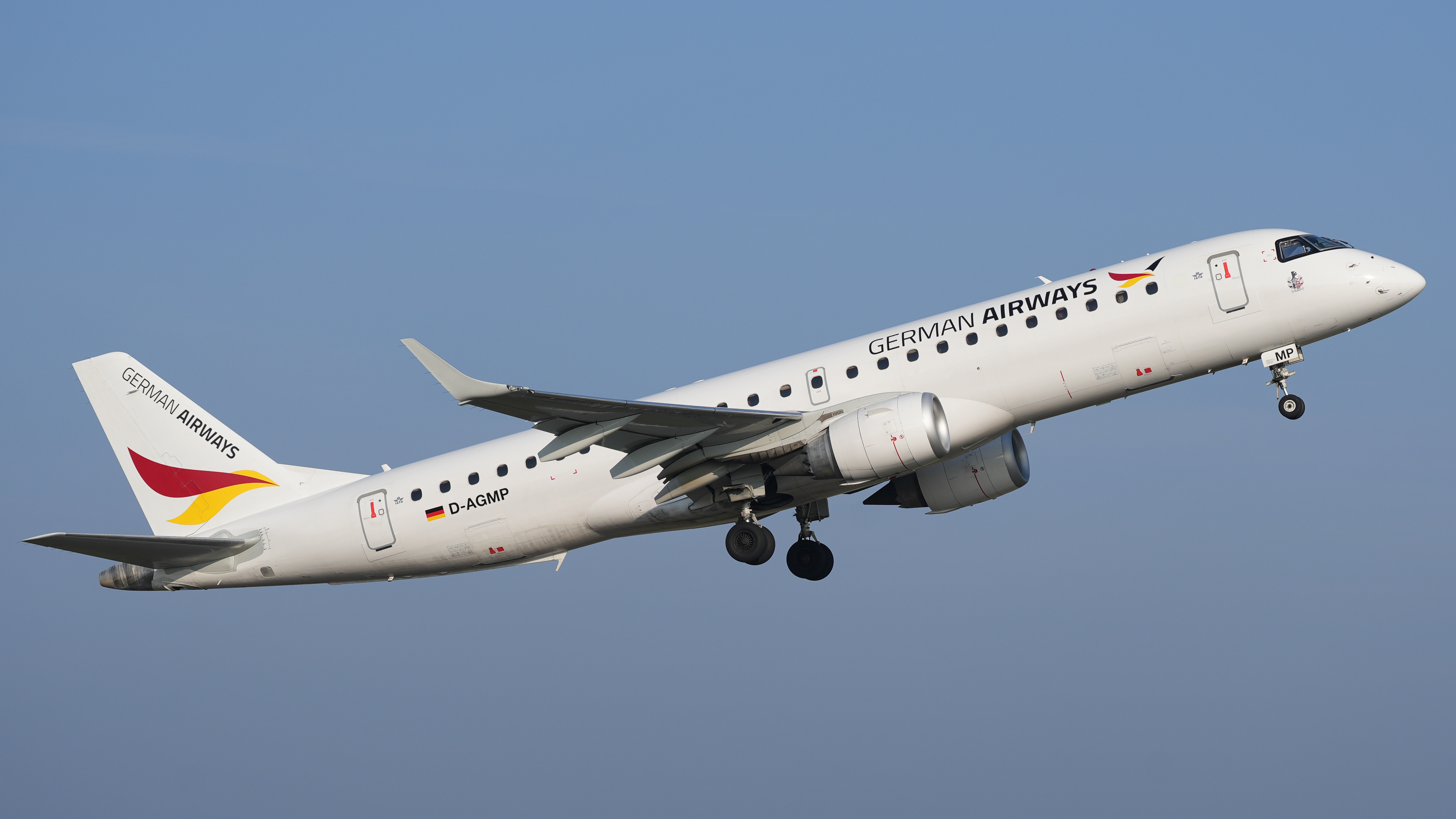
- Embraer 190AR
IATA	ICAO	Call sign
WH	WDL	WDL
- Founded: 1991 as WDL Aviation
- Commenced operations: 1991 as WDL Aviation
- Operating bases: Cologne Bonn Airport
- Fleet size: 8
- Parent company: Zeitfracht
- Headquarters: Cologne, Germany
- Key people: Wolfram Simon-Schröter (MD); Walter Böhnke (Advisory Board Chairman)
- Website: germanairways.com

German Regional Airlines GmbH & Co. KG, operating as German Airways Fluggesellschaft GmbH and formerly named WDL Aviation, is a German charter and wet lease aircraft operator, headquartered at Cologne Bonn Airport, and part of the Zeitfracht Group.

== History ==
=== The beginnings ===
The airline's origins date back to WDL-Westdeutsche Luftwerbung K.G., founded in 1955 but legally registered the following year, as an aerial advertising provider. Initial operations consisted exclusively of on-demand and passenger and freight charter flights. As operations grew, several larger aircraft joined the fleet.

Some years later a subsidiary company named WDL Flugdienst was established. The fleet included aircraft suitable for short- and medium-range operations: Fairchild FH.227s, Fokker 27s, and Swearingen Metroliners. For a time, scheduled flights were also operated on behalf of DLT.

In 1991 the parent was reorganized as WDL Group and at the same time the bulk of operations were concentrated in a new airline, WDL Aviation (Koln) GmbH, established to operate even larger aircraft and which inherited all the previous activities. The aerial advertising and sightseeing flight branch (using blimps) survives in the other subsidiary of WDL Group, which is called WDL Luftschiff. Since 1998, the British Aerospace 146 was in service with WDL Aviation. Other aircraft types that were operated included the Fokker F27 Friendship and an Airbus A320-200 on lease between 1992 and 1993.

WDL Aviation was acquired by the Berlin logistics company Zeitfracht on 1 October 2017. During 2018, the air carrier started acquiring BAe 146-300 QT freighter aircraft while planning to replace its BAe 146 passenger aircraft with newer Embraer 190s and received the brand name German Airways thereafter.

=== German Airways ===
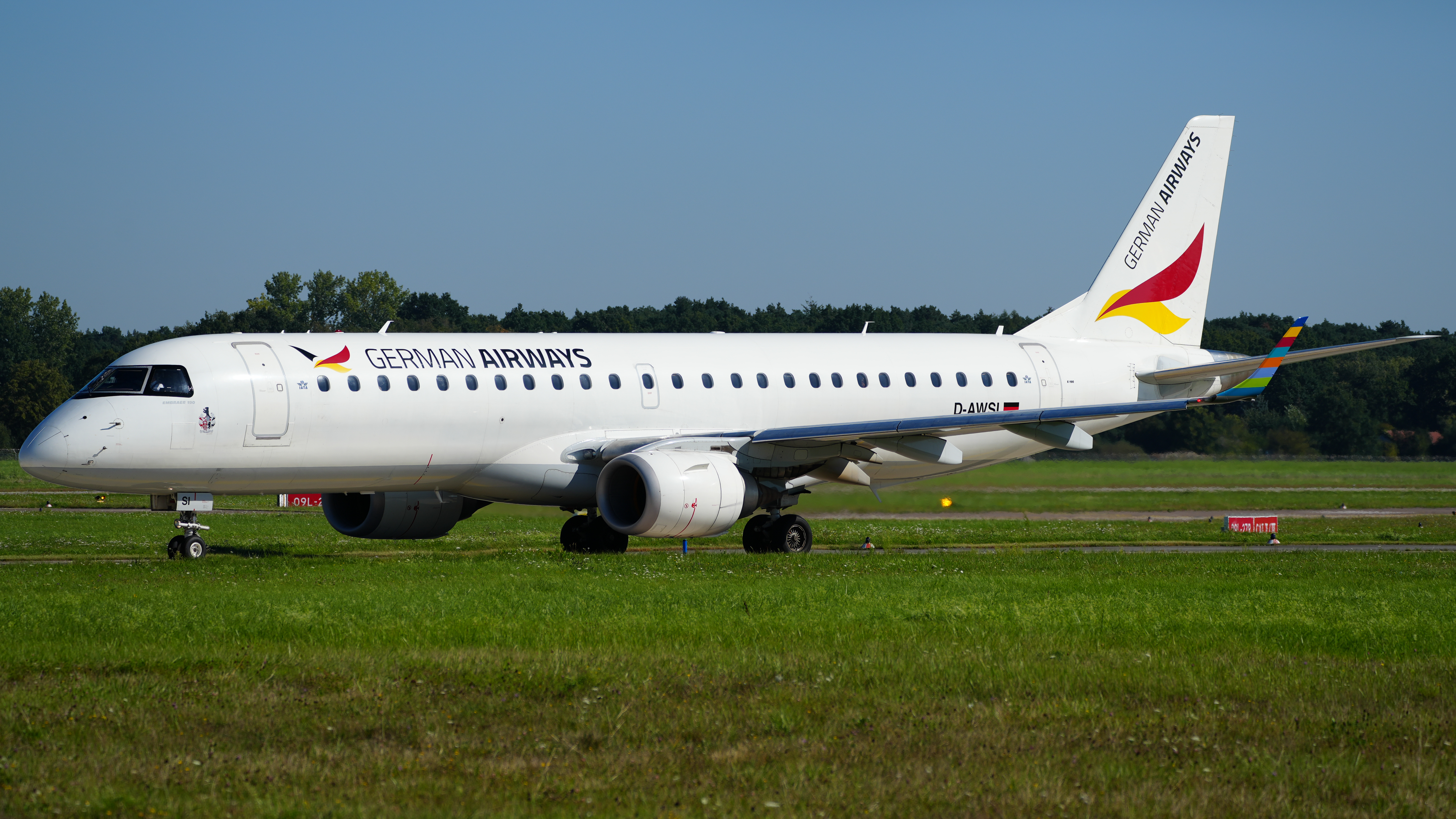
German Regional Airlines Embraer 190 branded German Airways

In March 2020, Zeitfracht announced another rebranding for WDL Aviation which was to become German Regional Airlines operating within the German Airways branding alongside sister company Luftfahrtgesellschaft Walter (LGW) which became the actual, and now defunct, German Airways. German Airways Flug GmbH was duly registered in December 2020 and started flying immediately with Embraer 190s branded German Airways

== Corporate affairs ==
=== Ownership and structure ===
German Regional Airlines is owned by Zeitfracht Group, an owner-managed family business with interests in logistics, aviation and real estate. It has its headquarters in Berlin and over 1,200 employees. German Airways is part of Zeitfracht Aviation, together with the now defunct German Airways Fluggesellschaft mbH, which ran short-lived wet lease operations for Eurowings.

== Fleet ==
As of August 2025, German Regional Airlines the following aircraft:

German Regional Airlines fleet
Aircraft	In fleet	Orders	Notes
Embraer 190	8	—	Operated under the German Airways brand
Total	8	—	

== Gallery ==
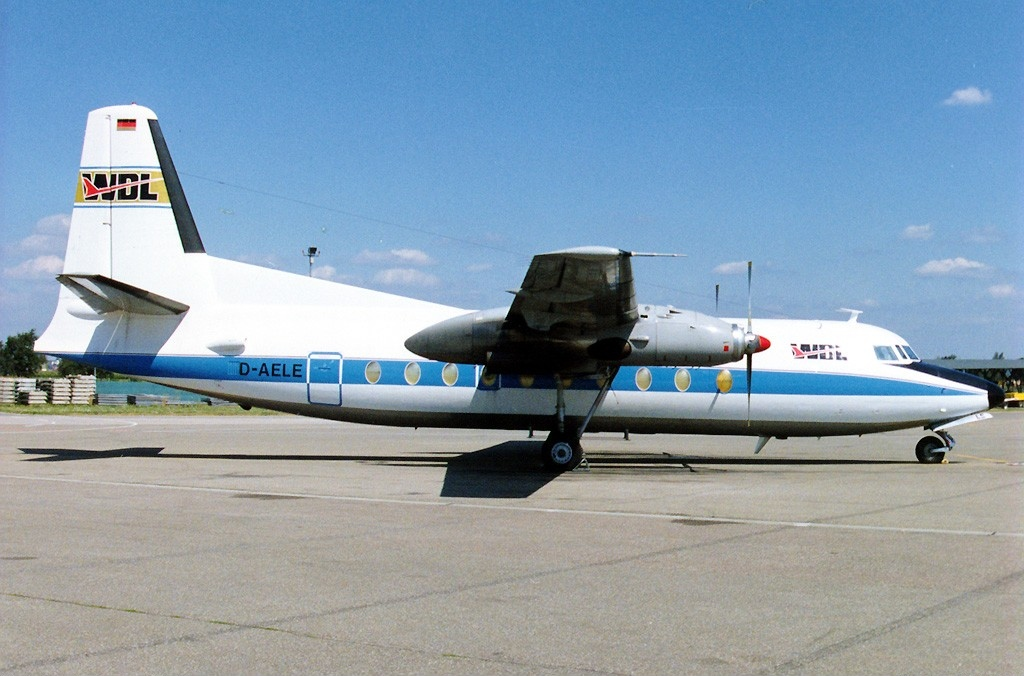
Fokker F-27-600 Friendship

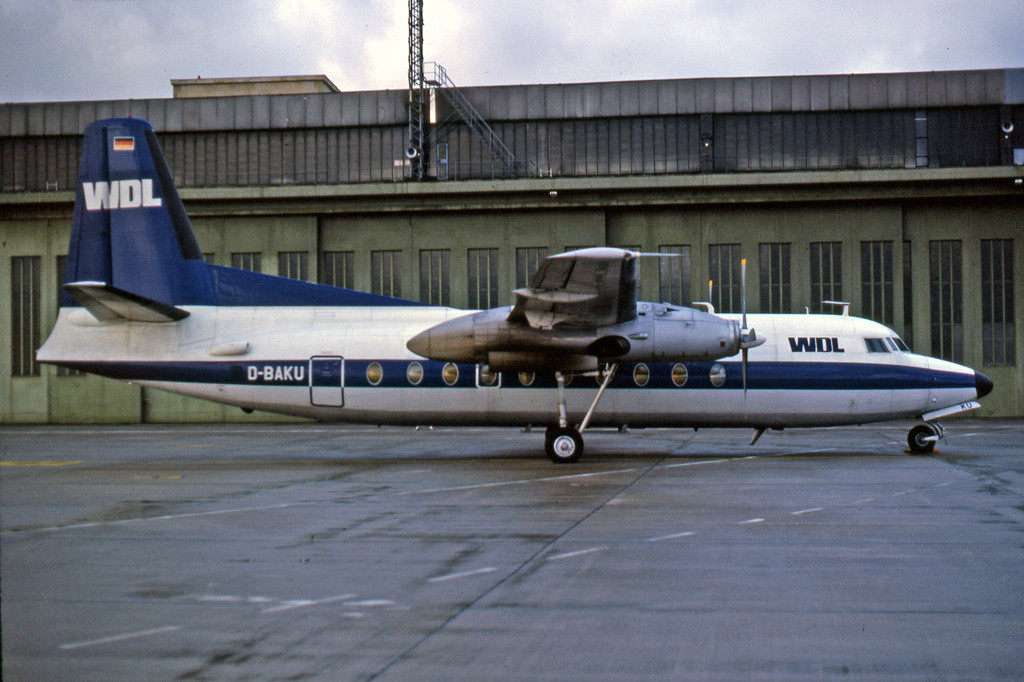
Fokker F-27-200 operated on DLT behalf

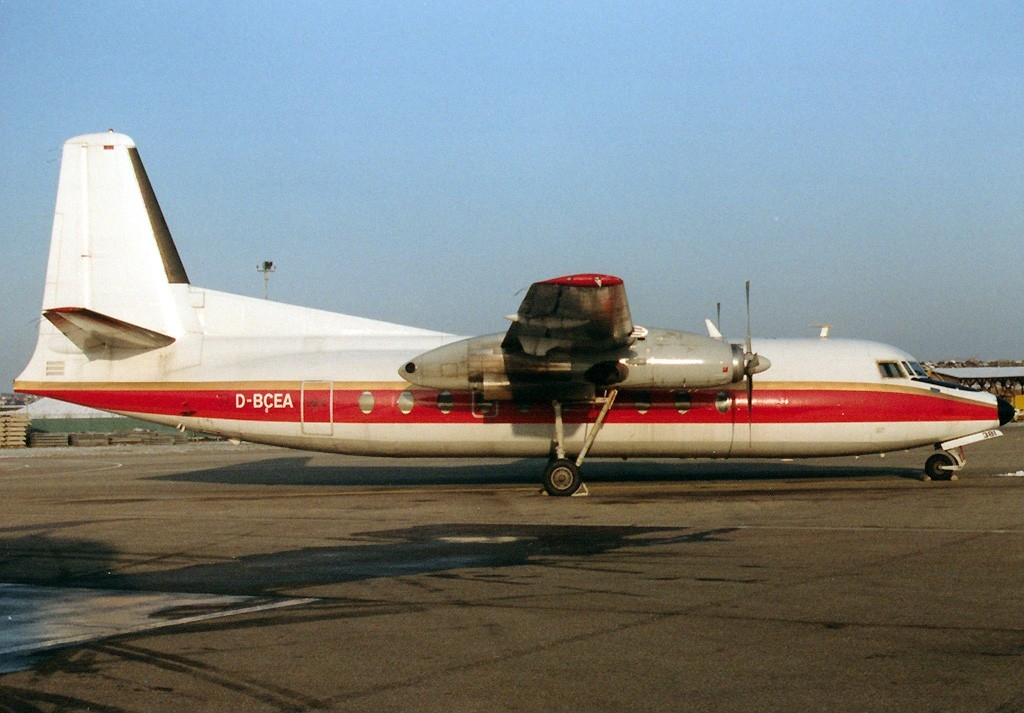
Fairchild F-27J

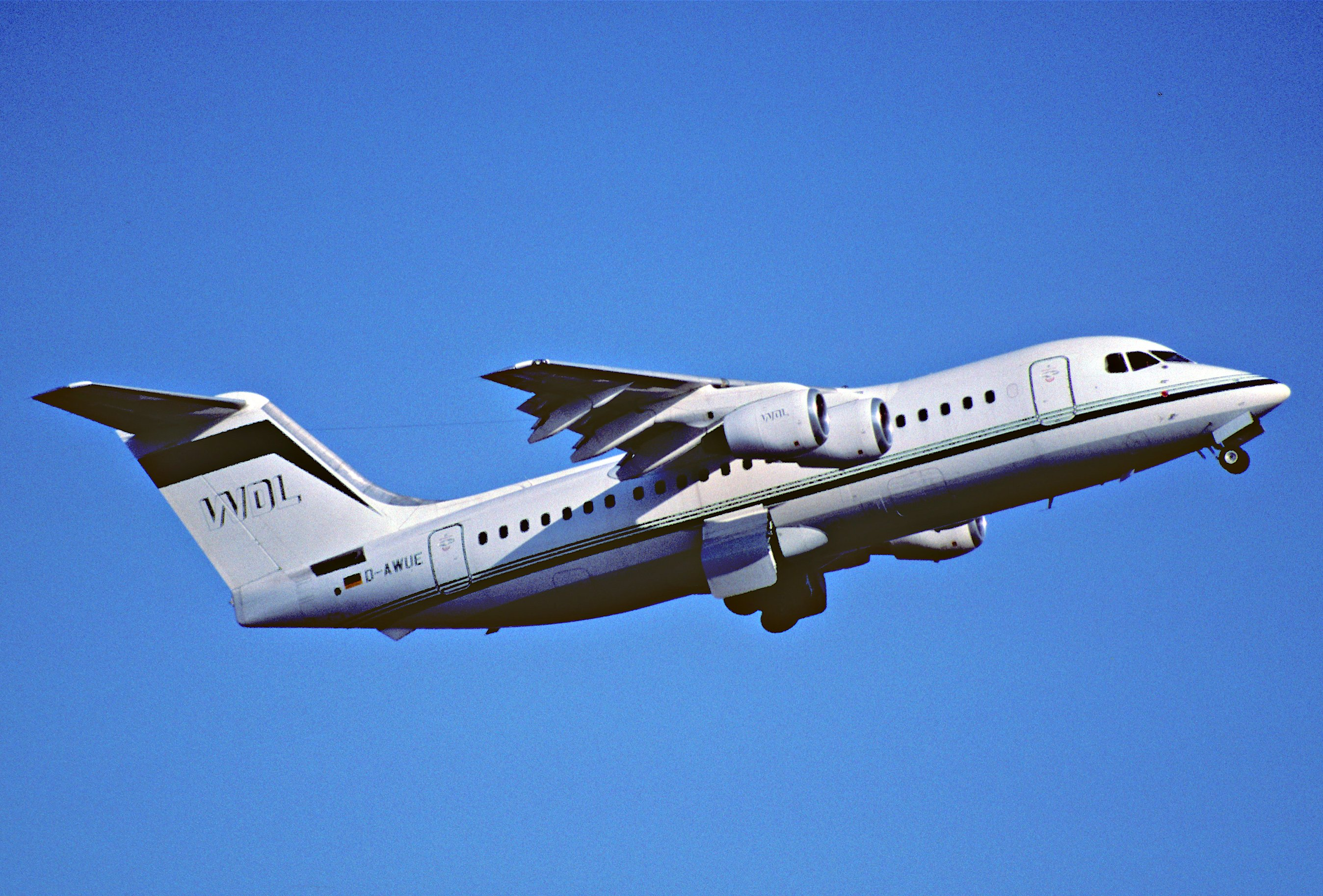
BAe.146-200

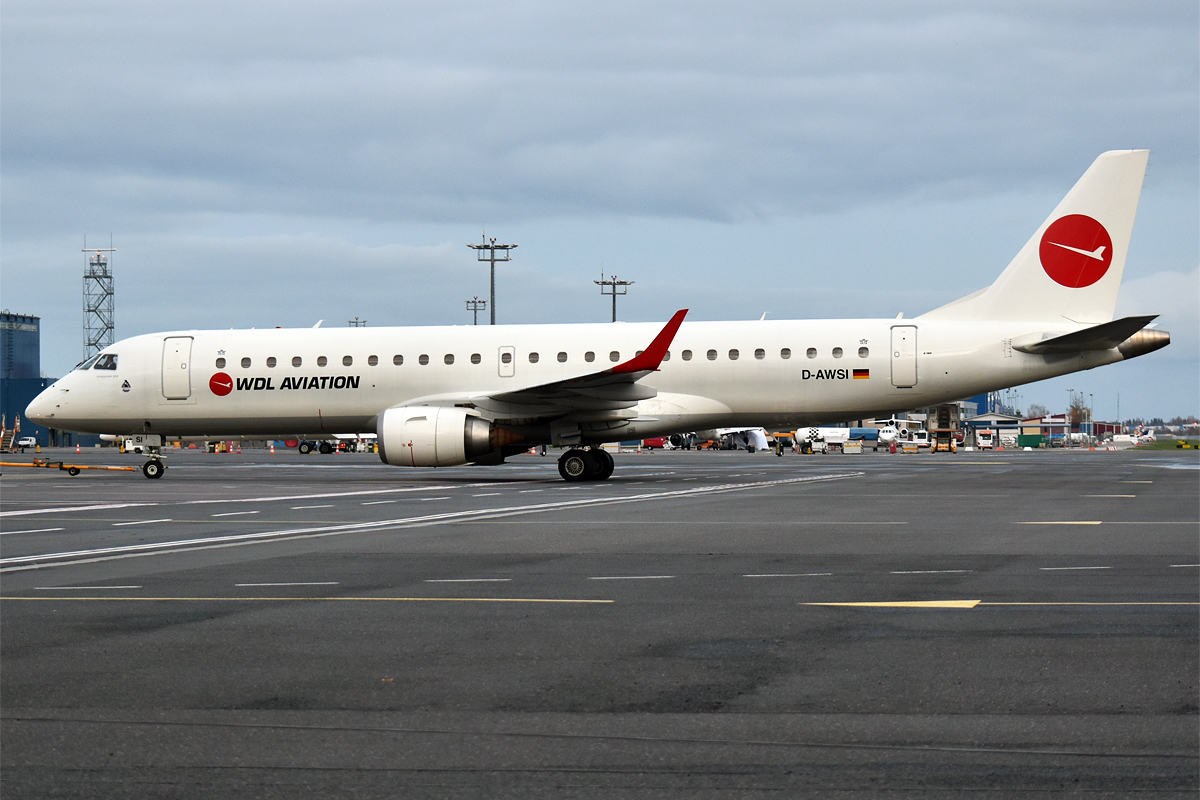
Embraer ERJ-190LR

== Incidents ==
- On 25 March 2019, British Airways Flight 3271 operated by then WDL Aviation, which took off from London City Airport en route to Düsseldorf but landed in Edinburgh. BA blamed WDL Aviation for a paperwork error.
