= European Air Express =

German regional airline

IATA	ICAO	Call sign
EA	EAL	STAR WING
- Founded: 1999
- Commenced operations: 1999
- Ceased operations: 2007
- Operating bases: Mönchengladbach Airport
- Hubs: Cologne Bonn Airport; Münster Osnabrück Airport; Stuttgart Airport
- Headquarters: Mönchengladbach, Germany
- Website: www.eae.aero

European Air Express was a regional airline based in Mönchengladbach, Germany.

== History ==
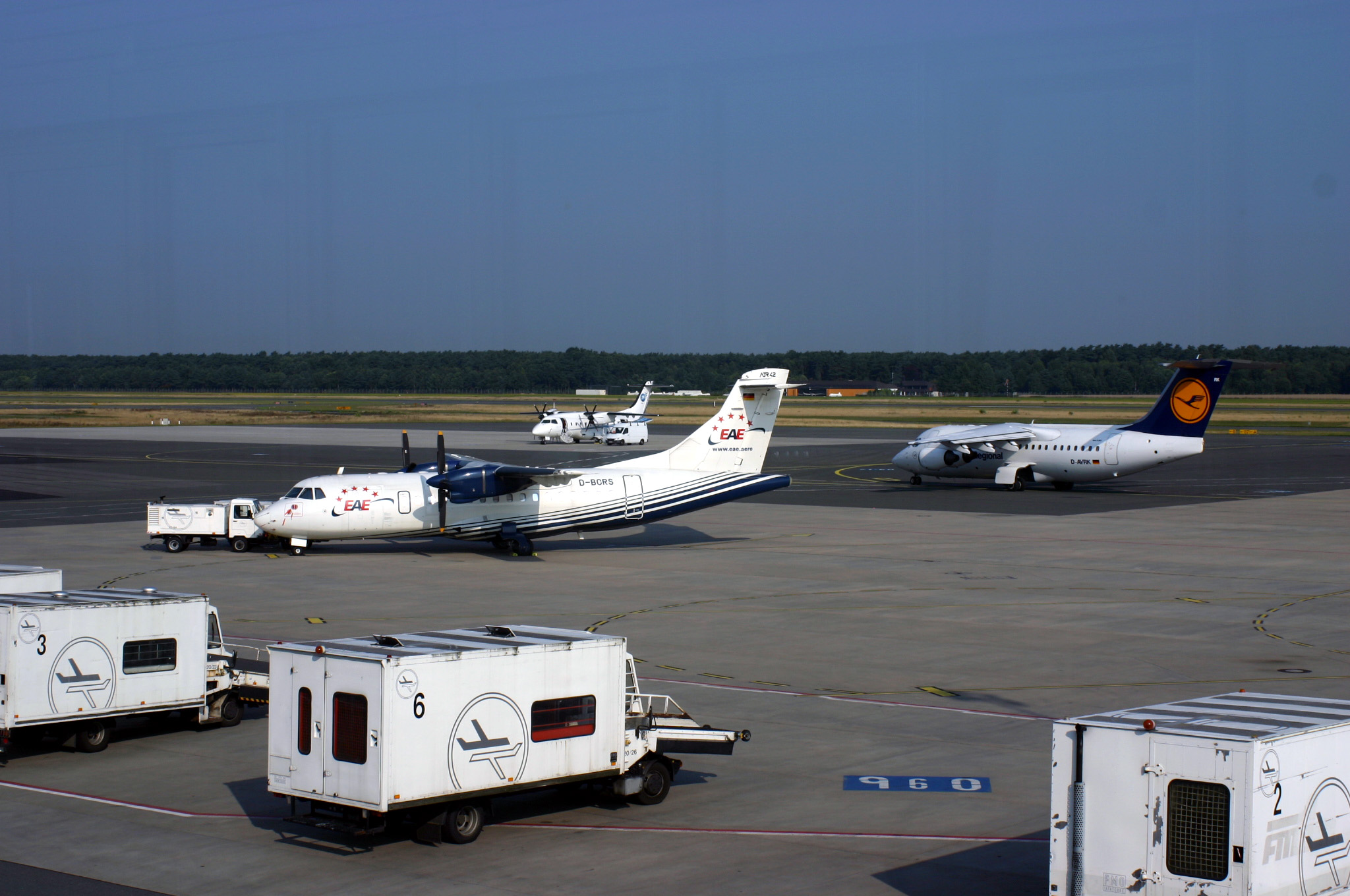
A European Air Express ATR-42

The airline was established in 1999 and started operations in February 1999. It was wholly owned by Vibro Beteiligungs and had 80 employees (at March 2007).

On 14 June 2007 the airline announced that it would end operations on 30 September 2007. All services were suspended in June and July 2007 ahead of the planned closure.

== Destinations ==
EAE operated scheduled passenger services from and within Germany. Its main base was Düsseldorf-Mönchengladbach Airport, with hubs at Cologne Bonn Airport, Münster Osnabrück Airport and Stuttgart Airport.

== Fleet ==
The European Air Express fleet included the following aircraft (at March 2007):

- 5 ATR 42-300
- 1 Fairchild Metro III
