= List of BAC One-Eleven operators =

The following is a list of past operators of the BAC One-Eleven. As of 23 September 2014, no BAC One-Eleven airline operators and aircraft are operating for any military entities.

== Civil operators ==
| Airline | Country | 200 | 300 | 400 | 500 | Notes |
|---|---|---|---|---|---|---|
| ADC Airlines | (Nigeria) | 2 | | 1 | | |
| Adria Airways | (Socialist Federal Republic of Yugoslavia) | | | | 5 | Leased from TAROM |
| Aer Lingus | (Republic of Ireland) | 4 | | | | |
| Aero Asia International | (Pakistan) | | | | 7 | |
| Aeroamerica | (United States) | | | 1 | | |
| Aerotaxi Monse | (Mexico) | 1 | | | | |
| Air Illinois | (United States) | 2 | | 2 | | |
| Air Katanga | (Democratic Republic of the Congo) | 1 | | | | |
| Air Malawi | (Malawi) | 1 | | 2 | 3 | |
| Air Manchester | (United Kingdom) | | | 2 | | |
| Air Pacific | (Fiji) | | | 3 | | |
| Air Siam | (Thailand) | | | 1 | | Leased from Robin Loh |
| Air UK | (United Kingdom) | | | 4 | | |
| Airways International Cymru | (United Kingdom) | | 2 | 1 | | Ceased operations in 1988 |
| Air Wisconsin | (United States) | 4 | | | | Sold to Florida Express |
| Allegheny Airlines | (United States) | 31 | | | | Rebranded as USAir in 1988 |
| Aloha Airlines | (United States) | 3 | | | | Sold to Mohawk Airlines |
| American Airlines | (United States) | | | 30 | | |
| Anglo Cargo | (United Kingdom) | | | 1 | | Leased from TAROM |
| Arkia | (Israel) | | | | 2 | |
| Atlantic Gulf Airlines | (United States) | | | 1 | | Leased from Cascade Airways |
| Austral Líneas Aéreas | (Argentina) | | | 6 | 11 | |
| Autair International | (United Kingdom) | | | 5 | 1 | Renamed to Court Line in 1970 |
| Aviateca | (Guatemala) | | | | 4 | |
| Bavaria Fluggesellschaft | (Germany) | | | 7 | 4 | Became Bavaria Germanair in 1977 |
| Braniff International Airways | (United States) | 14 | | | | |
| Braniff Inc. | (United States) | 15 | | 3 | | Ceased operations in 1989 |
| Bahamasair | (The Bahamas) | | | 4 | | |
| Belize Airways | (Belize) | | | | ? | |
| British Air Ferries | (United Kingdom) | 3 | | 2 | 11 | Rebranded as British World Airlines in 1993 |
| British Airways | (United Kingdom) | | | 8 | 36 | |
| British Caledonian Airways | (United Kingdom) | 7 | 4 | 1 | 19 | Acquired by British Airways in 1988 |
| British Eagle | (United Kingdom) | 2 | 5 | | | Ceased operations in 1968 |
| British European Airways | (United Kingdom) | | | | 18 | Merged with BOAC to form British Airways in 1974 |
| British Island Airways (I) | (United Kingdom) | | | 4 | | Became Air UK in 1980 |
| British Island Airways (II) | (United Kingdom) | | | 5 | 7 | |
| British Midland Airways | (United Kingdom) | | 1 | 1 | 3 | Leased from Airways International Cymru, Dan-Air, and British Aircraft Corporation |
| British United Airways | (United Kingdom) | 10 | | 1 | 8 | Launch customer Merged with Caledonian Airways to form British Caledonian in 1970 |
| Britt Airways | (United States) | | | 2 | | Sold to Okada Air |
| Caledonian Airways | (United Kingdom) | | | | 4 | Merged with British United Airways to form British Caledonian in 1970 |
| Cambrian Airways | (United Kingdom) | | | 4 | | Merged with British Airways in 1976 |
| Cascade Airways | (United States) | 3 | | 2 | | Ceased operations in 1986 |
| Cayman Airways | (Cayman Islands) | | | | 3 | |
| Channel Airways | (United Kingdom) | | | 3 | | Ceased operations in 1972 |
| Court Line | (United Kingdom) | | | 3 | 15 | Ceased operations in 1974 |
| Cyprus Airways | (Cyprus) | | | | 6 | |
| Dan-Air | (United Kingdom) | 2 | 4 | 5 | 15 | Merged into British Airways in 1992 |
| Emerald Air | (United States) | 1 | | | | Leased from USAir |
| European Aviation Air Charter | (United Kingdom) | | | | 19 | |
| Faucett Perú | (Peru) | | | 2 | 1 | |
| Florida Express | (United States) | 16 | | 6 | | Merged into Braniff Inc. in 1988 |
| Germanair | (Germany) | | | 1 | 7 | Became Bavaria Germanair in 1977 |
| Gulf Aviation | (Bahrain) | | | 2 | | |
| Gulf Air | (Bahrain) | | | 4 | | |
| Hapag-Lloyd Flug | (Germany) | | | | 7 | |
| Hold-Trade Air | (Nigeria) | 4 | | | | |
| Kabo Air | (Nigeria) | 9 | | 7 | | |
| LACSA | (Costa Rica) | | | 2 | 4 | |
| Ladeco | (Chile) | 2 | 2 | | | |
| Laker Airways | (United Kingdom) | | 5 | 1 | | |
| LANICA | (Nicaragua) | 1 | | 2 | 1 | |
| Lauda Air | (Austria) | | | | 2 | Leased from TAROM |
| LIAT | (Antigua and Barbuda) | | | | 4 | Leased from Court Line |
| London European Airways | (United Kingdom) | | | 1 | 4 | Ceased operations in 1991 |
| Mohawk Airlines | (United States) | 24 | | | | Merged into Allegheny Airlines in 1972 |
| Monarch Airlines | (United Kingdom) | | | | 4 | |
| Nationwide Airlines | (South Africa) | | | 5 | 6 | |
| Okada Air | (Nigeria) | 2 | 7 | 13 | 3 | |
| Orientair | (United Kingdom) | | | 1 | | Never entered service |
| Paninternational | (Germany) | | | | 4 | Ceased operations in 1971 |
| Pacific American Airlines | (United States) | | | 1 | | In fleet briefly; airline ceased ops 1978 |
| Pacific Express | (United States) | 9 | | | | Ceased operations in 1984 |
| Philippine Airlines | (Philippines) | | | 4 | 13 | |
| Quebecair | (Canada) | 1 | 2 | 3 | | |
| Romavia | (Romania) | | | | 3 | |
| Ryanair | (Republic of Ireland) | | | | 16 | |
| Sadia | (Brazil) | | | | 3 | Renamed to Transbrasil in 1972 |
| SARO | (Mexico) | 1 | | | | |
| SCAT Airlines | (Kazakhstan) | | | | 2 | Leased from Trast Aero |
| TACA International Airlines | (El Salvador) | | | 4 | 1 | |
| Trabajos Aéreos y Enlaces | (Spain) | | | 1 | | |
| TAROM | (Romania) | | | 10 | 13 | |
| Tikal Jets Airlines | (Guatemala) | | | 2 | | |
| Transbrasil | (Brazil) | | | | 9 | |
| USAir | (United States) | 30 | | | | |
| VASP | (Brazil) | | | 2 | | |
| Wright Air Lines | (United States) | 1 | | | | Leased from Air Illinois |
| Zambia Airways | (Zambia) | 2 | | | | Sold to Dan-Air |

== Military and government operators ==
=== Military ===
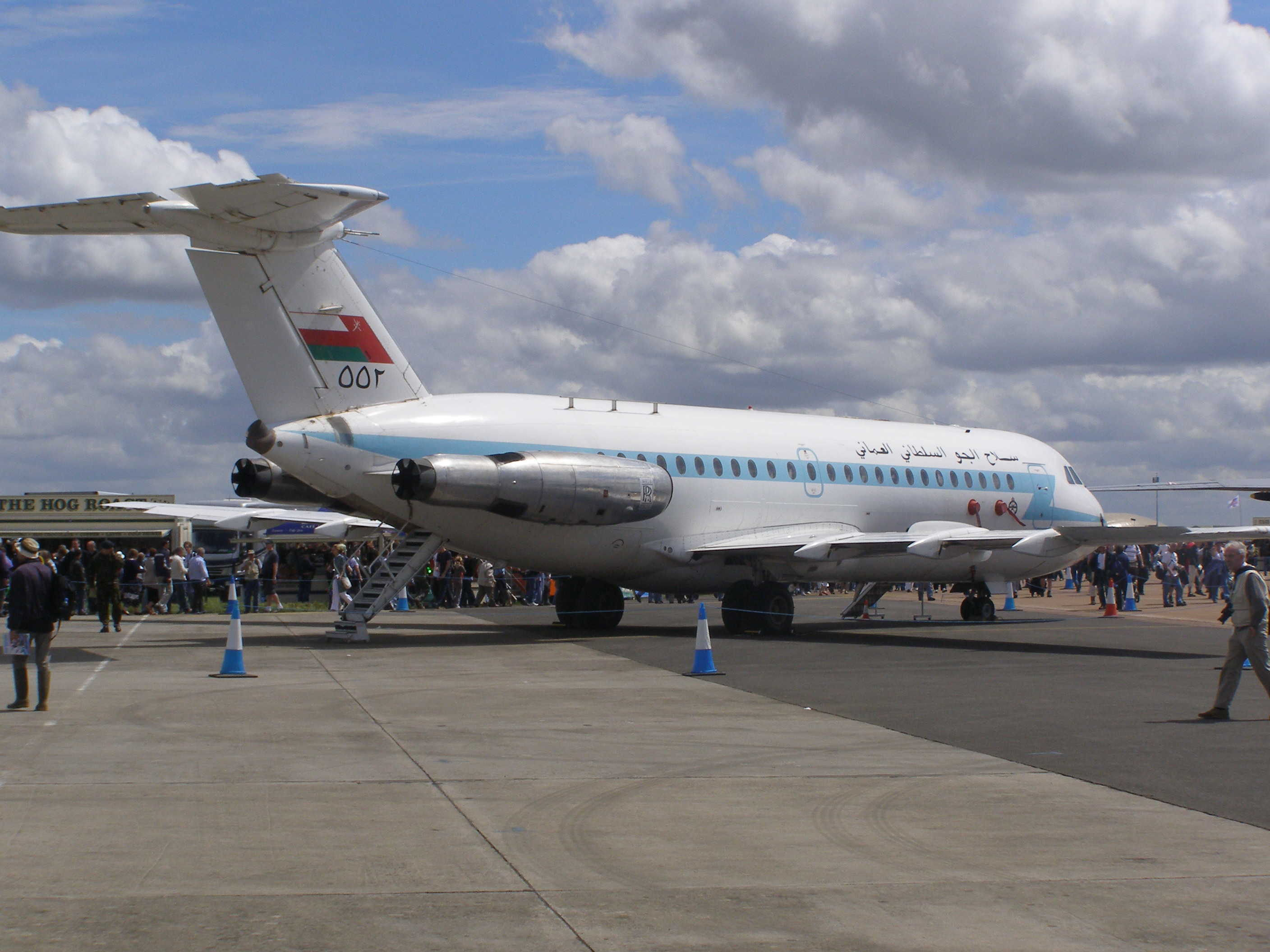
Royal Air Force of Oman One-Eleven 485GD

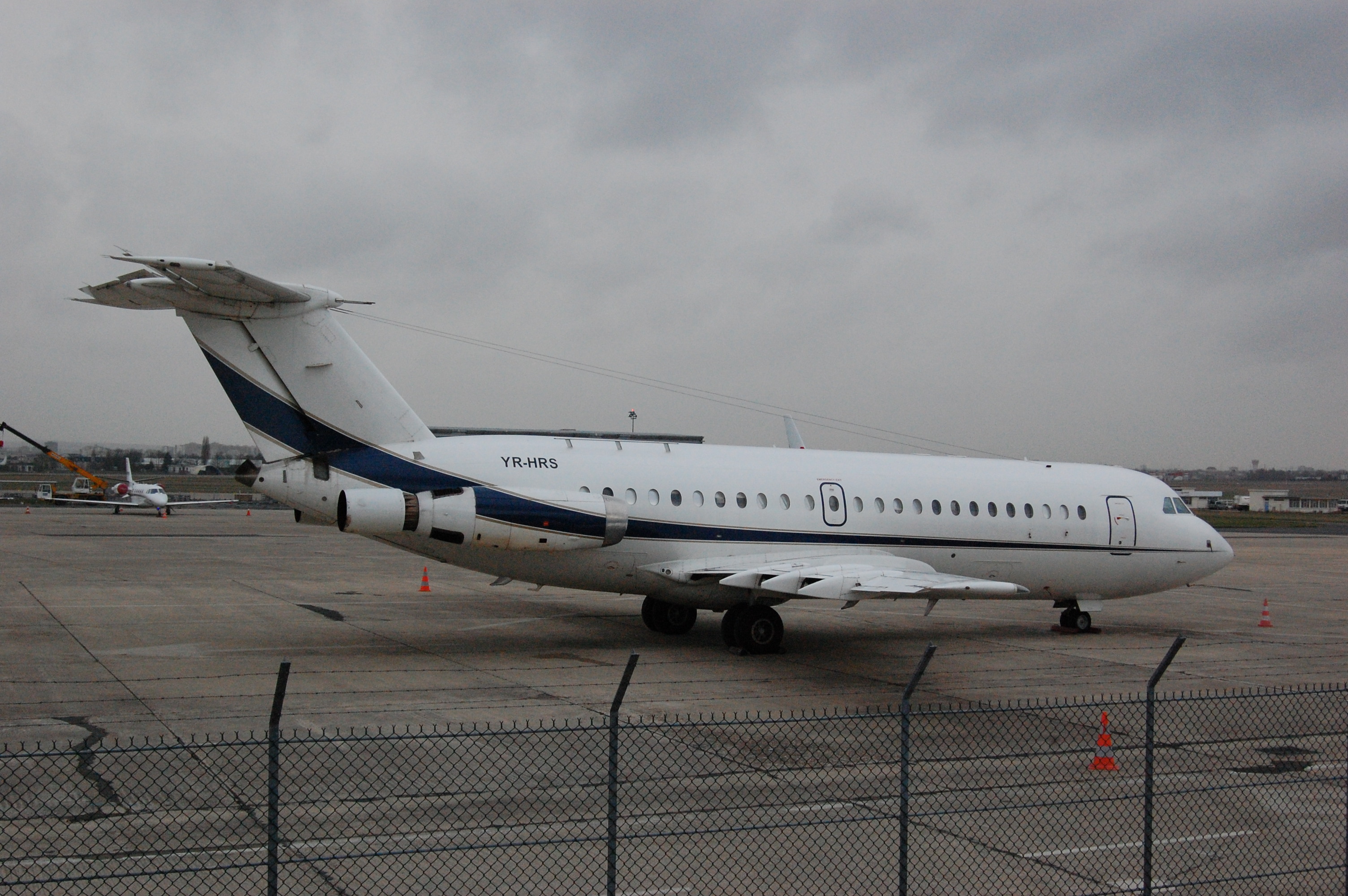
BAC-111 (YR-HRS) at Paris – Le Bourget Airport in spring 2009

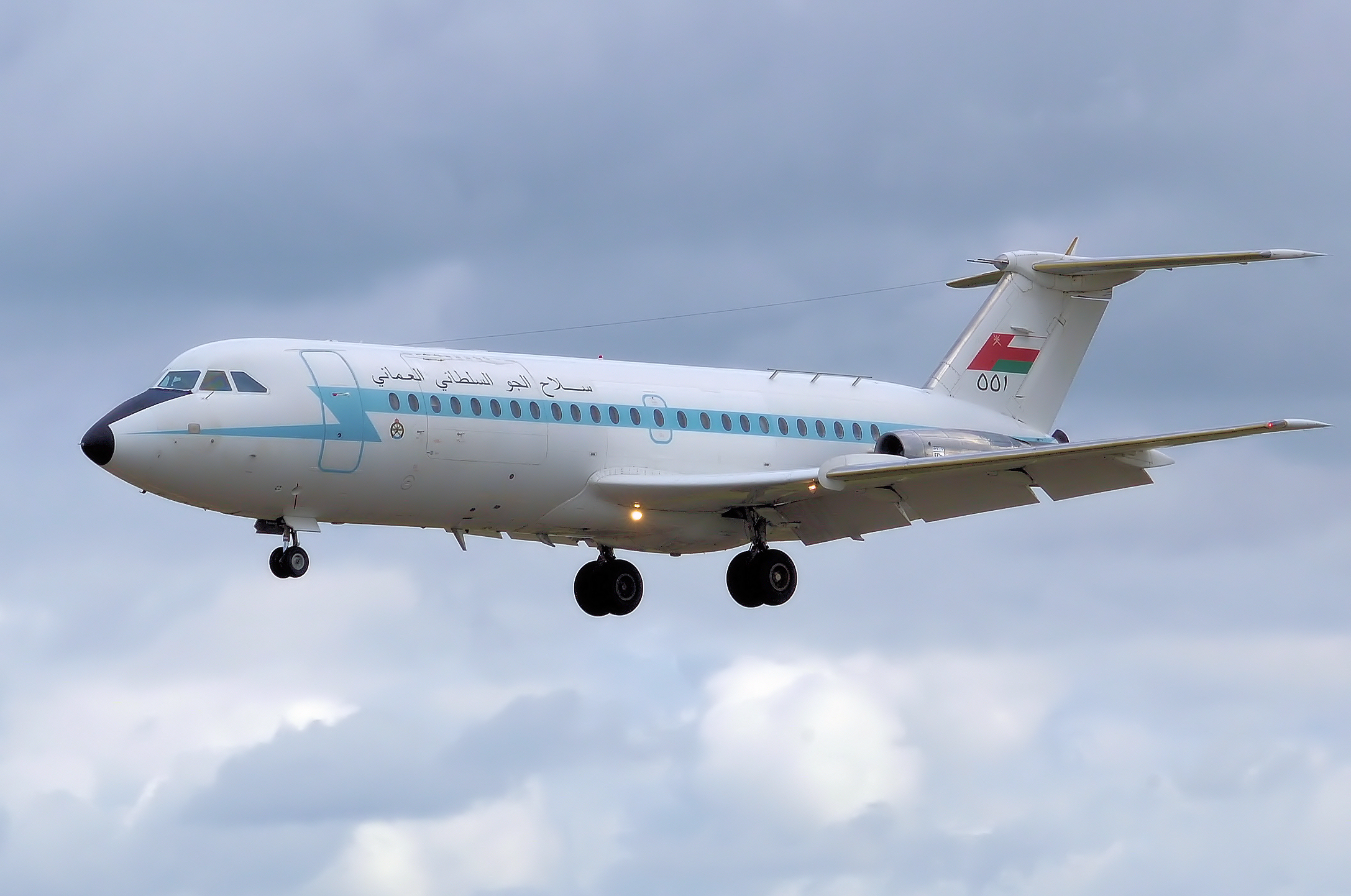
Royal Air Force of Oman One-Eleven Model 485GD lands at RIAT 2008

Australia

- Royal Australian Air Force - Two aircraft from 1967 to 1990.
  - No. 34 Squadron RAAF

Brazil

- Brazilian Air Force - Two aircraft, with the Brazilian Air Force designation VC-92, operated in VIP role from 1968 to 1974.

Oman

- Royal Air Force of Oman

Philippines

- Philippine Air Force (1974-1984)
  - 702 Squadron

United Kingdom

- Royal Air Force
  - Empire Test Pilots' School
  - Royal Aircraft Establishment

=== Government ===
Mexico

- Mexican Government

Philippines

- Philippine Government

Romania

- Romanian Government

United Arab Emirates

- Government of the United Arab Emirates

== Corporate operators ==
The One-Eleven was also operated by corporate operators, particularly in the United States and the Middle East. An example was Tenneco, a US-based company.
