= Braniff (1991–1992) =

Airline based in Dallas, Texas, US

Braniff International Airlines
| IATA | ICAO | Call sign |
|---|---|---|
| BE | BNF | BRANIFF |
- Founded: July 1, 1991; 34 years ago
- Ceased operations: July 2, 1992; 33 years ago
- Hubs: Dallas Fort Worth International Airport
- Fleet size: 13
- Destinations: 16
- Parent company: BNAir, Inc.
- Headquarters: Dallas, Texas, U.S.
- Key people: Jeffrey Chodorow; Arthur Cohen; Scot Spencer

Braniff International Airlines, Inc. was a low-fare airline formed in 1991 from the assets of two earlier airlines that used the Braniff name. It was headquartered in the Dallas, Texas, area and owned by BNAir, Inc., a subsidiary of BIA-COR Holdings Inc., a Philadelphia investment group, formed by Paine Weber Group, and subsequent airline holding company. The airline is popularly identified as Braniff III to differentiate it from its predecessors.

The airline started flights on July 1, 1991 and filed for bankruptcy less than two months later, but was able to secure sufficient funding to continue operating until July 2, 1992, nearly a year after its formation, when it shut down permanently amid an investigation into misconduct by its corporate officers.

== History ==
=== Formation from Braniff Inc. assets ===
In 1990, Jeffrey Chodorow, Arthur Cohen, and Scot Spencer formed BNAir Inc., a vehicle specifically used to purchase the assets of Braniff Inc. from three bankruptcy auctions. With these assets, the group formed Braniff International Airlines, Inc. which itself was formed from the assets of Braniff International Airways.

The new airline did not possess a United States Department of Transportation (USDOT) air operator's certificate and was scrutinized intensely by the USDOT, which made it clear in January 1990 that they did not believe that Braniff's management team, headed by Scot Spencer, was capable of conducting airline operations, based on Spencer's conduct while employed with Braniff Inc. and his criminal history. Spencer had helped orchestrate the 1988 sale of Braniff Inc. to BIA-COR but was subsequently ousted from a consultancy at Braniff Inc. due to persistent conflicts: he was accused of meddling in Braniff management decisions despite lacking formal authority to do so, of antagonizing Braniff's tour wholesaler, and of arranging aircraft leases that were unfavorable to the airline. Braniff Inc. employees reportedly held him in "total contempt." Spencer also resigned from a consultancy for BIA-COR Holdings Inc., reportedly due to concerns about his repeated arrests for writing bad checks and an arrest warrant for having failed to return a rental car in 1988. In May 1990, Spencer was arrested under the rental car warrant while attending a Braniff Inc. equipment liquidation sale, but he was released after posting a $1,000 bond; Spencer denied that the arrest had taken place and attributed the charges to a "misunderstanding."

In September 1990, Braniff International Airlines, Inc. initiated the acquisition of the assets of bankrupt Austin, Texas air charter company Emerald Air, including its air operator's certificate, four McDonnell Douglas DC-9-10, a maintenance hangar at Houston Intercontinental Airport, and its inventory of spare aircraft parts. Braniff merged with Emerald and sought to fly under that carrier's operating certificate, but the USDOT still refused to permit Braniff to begin flights unless the principals of the new airline signed sworn affidavits stating that Spencer would not be involved in any capacity at the carrier. Spencer, Chodorow, and Cohen submitted affidavits in May 1991 stating that Spencer would have no connection nor hold any position with Braniff nor Emerald in any capacity, directly or indirectly. Spencer personally promised not to make any decisions for the airline or direct any of its employees, including consulting or advising. This satisfied the USDOT and the airline was granted permission to start flights.

=== Operations begin ===
On 1 July 1991, Braniff International commenced scheduled airline operations. At this time, the Braniff fleet consisted of eight leased aircraft, including five Boeing 727s and three DC-9s. On 16 July 1991, Braniff abruptly ended service to Los Angeles International Airport (LAX), citing an unexplained failure to secure permanent passenger handling facilities there: the airline did not have access to a gate or a ticket counter, causing arriving passengers to have trouble finding and boarding their flights. Braniff CEO Gregory Dix attributed the problems to a lack of cooperation by LAX officials—an allegation denied by the Los Angeles director of airport operations.

On 7 August 1991, Braniff International filed for Chapter 11 bankruptcy a mere 37 days after starting service, attributing the move to the loss of a charter contract with an unnamed Canadian tour company and the cancellation of the LAX service. On 12 September 1991, Braniff withdrew from Dallas/Fort Worth International Airport (DFW), citing the LAX dispute and problems with an aircraft lessor. Dix resigned the next day and was replaced by Jeffrey Chodorow.

Although still operating under bankruptcy protection, Chodorow announced on 4 December 1991 that the airline had secured sufficient funding to return to DFW, with an ambitious flight schedule to start on 15 January 1992.

=== Operations end ===
On Thursday, 2 July 1992, Braniff abruptly ceased operations two days before the busy Fourth of July holiday weekend, citing declining revenues caused by an ongoing fare war with other airlines. The airline immediately went into Chapter 7 liquidation. Braniff became the fourth airline in 18 months to cease operations and joined Eastern Airlines, Pan American World Airways, and Midway Airlines in bankruptcy. Thousands of Braniff customers were left stranded and limited help was offered by other airlines. Braniff encouraged passengers with confirmed tickets to contact their credit card companies for refunds. An announcement was made the following Tuesday, 7 July 1992, that the beleaguered carrier might refund tickets that were paid for with cash or checks.

Continental Airlines and United Airlines waived their standard 14-day advance purchase requirement for Braniff ticket holders. America West offered to fly Braniff's customers on a standby basis for US$75. American Airlines and Delta Air Lines did not offer assistance and announced that they would not take Braniff tickets. Braniff management cited intense competition and fare wars initiated by Northwest Airlines and American as key reasons for the unannounced shutdown. Buying tickets on Braniff required calling the airline or visiting a ticket counter as the carrier was not part of a large airline reservation system. Because of this tickets could not be purchased at travel agencies. Three other airlines were reorganizing under bankruptcy protection when Braniff ceased operations and included America West, Continental and Trans World Airlines. A nationwide recession exacerbated Braniff's as well as other carrier's financial problems.

=== Principals indicted for fraud ===
In early 1992, the Federal Aviation Administration (FAA) and USDOT were informed that Spencer was secretly being paid by Braniff, and that the airline's corporate officers were engaging in a money laundering scheme designed to conceal this from the airline's creditors, the bankruptcy court, and the USDOT, which had secured the earlier affidavits promising Spencer's non-involvement in the company's corporate affairs. Chodorow submitted another affidavit claiming that the pledges made in the May 1991 affidavits had not been violated. Investigators eventually determined that Spencer had been "heavily involved" in the operations of the airline, and had been paid $351,411 in secret kickbacks from commissions paid to an advertising agency, whose owner was granted immunity in return for his testimony against Spencer.

On 19 July 1994, Jeffrey Chodorow and Scot Spencer were indicted for bankruptcy fraud, fraudulently concealing the bankrupt airline's property from creditors, defrauding the USDOT during the airline's certification, and obstructing a pending proceeding of the agency. In a plea bargain, the U.S. government dropped the bankruptcy fraud charges against Chodorow, in return for his guilty plea to the USDOT charges. Chodorow was sentenced to four months in prison and four years' supervised release and was ordered to pay a $40,000 fine; additionally, he agreed to pay the airline's bankruptcy trustees $1.25 million in restitution over five years. Spencer eventually conceded that he had “acted openly and flagrantly on behalf of Braniff” in violation of the terms of the 1991 affidavits. He was convicted of bankruptcy fraud and conspiracy to commit bankruptcy fraud and was sentenced on 23 May 1996 to a 51-month prison term followed by three years of supervised release. Spencer also agreed to pay $115,000 in restitution to the bankruptcy trustees.

== Destinations ==
The following destination information is from the Braniff International Airlines, Inc., 1 June 1992 through 24 June 1992 system timetable:

- Atlanta (ATL)
- Boston (BOS)
- Columbus, OH (CMH)
- Chicago/Midway Airport (MDW)
- Dallas/Ft. Worth (DFW)
- Fort Lauderdale (FLL)
- Islip/Long Island MacArthur Airport (ISP)
- Miami (MIA)
- Minneapolis/St. Paul (MSP)
- Newark International Airport (EWR)
- New York JFK International Airport (JFK)
- Orlando (MCO)
- St. Thomas, Virgin Islands (STT)
- San Juan, Puerto Rico (SJU)
- Tampa (TPA)
- West Palm Beach (PBI)

== Fleet ==
When flight operations began on 1 July 1991, the Braniff International fleet consisted of the following aircraft:

- 10 Boeing 727-200
- 3 McDonnell Douglas DC-9-10

== See also ==
- List of defunct airlines of the United States
- Braniff International Airways
- Braniff (1983–1990)
