= Jeffrey Chodorow =

American lawyer

- Born: March 2, 1950 (age 76); The Bronx, New York, U.S.
- Occupations: Restaurateur, financier, lawyer

Jeffrey R. Chodorow (born March 2, 1950) is an American restaurateur, lawyer and financier.

== Early life and education ==
Jeffrey Chodorow was born in the Bronx. His father died the year he was born, and he and his mother moved to Miami, Florida in 1950 to live with Chodorow's mother's sister. His mother and aunt were both manicurists in a Cuban barbershop. He grew up in Miami Beach. Chodorow grew up poor in a wealthy Miami area.

Chodorow graduated magna cum laude from the Wharton School of the University of Pennsylvania in 1972 with a degree in economics. He graduated from the University of Pennsylvania Law School in 1975 as a juris doctor. He was a lawyer in Pennsylvania and Florida.

== Career ==
In the 1970s, Chodorow developed shopping centers in Philadelphia, Pennsylvania. In 1987, he opened a Bojangles restaurant in Charlotte, North Carolina.

In June 1988, BIA-COR Holdings, headed by Chodorow, purchased Braniff Inc., the 1984 successor to Braniff International Airways, owned by Hyatt Corporation. Braniff Inc. filed for chapter 11 bankruptcy protection in September 1989 and ceased scheduled operations in November. The carrier operated a limited air charter operation during December and ceased all operations at the end of the month. BIA-COR purchased the assets of Braniff Inc. at auction.

In 1991, BIA-COR resurrected the defunct airline, naming it Braniff International Airlines, Inc. after the original Braniff International Airways. However, the reborn airline was scrutinized intensely by the United States Department of Transportation (USDOT), which did not believe that its management team was qualified, mostly due to leader Scot Spencer's conduct during a consultancy with Braniff Inc. and his criminal history. Spencer had resigned from the consultancy, reportedly over concerns about his repeated arrests for writing bad checks and an arrest warrant for having failed to return a rental car in 1988. Seeking another way to begin flights, Braniff initiated the acquisition of the assets of bankrupt Austin, Texas, air charter company Emerald Air, including its air operator's certificate, but the USDOT still refused to certify Braniff unless the principals submitted sworn affidavits stating that Spencer would not be involved in any capacity. Chodorow and others did so, which satisfied the USDOT, and the airline was granted permission to operate.

Braniff International Airlines began flights on July 1, 1991, but filed for chapter 11 bankruptcy 37 days later. Chief executive officer Gregory Dix resigned in early September and was replaced by Chodorow. The bankrupt airline was able to secure sufficient financing to continue flying, only to shut down permanently on July 2, 1992.

By this time, the Federal Aviation Administration (FAA) and USDOT were investigating Chodorow and Spencer over an alleged money laundering scheme designed to conceal Spencer's continued management of the airline. Investigators determined that Spencer had been "heavily involved" in airline operations and had been paid $351,411 in secret kickbacks from commissions paid to an advertising agency. On July 19, 1994, Chodorow and Spencer were indicted for bankruptcy fraud, fraudulently concealing the bankrupt airline's property from creditors, defrauding the USDOT during the airline's certification, and obstructing a pending proceeding of the agency. In a plea bargain, the U.S. government dropped the bankruptcy fraud charges against Chodorow in return for his guilty plea to the USDOT charges. On May 23, 1996, Chodorow was sentenced to four months in prison and four years supervised release and was ordered to pay a $40,000 fine; he had earlier agreed to pay the airline's bankruptcy trustees $1.25 million in restitution over five years.

Chodorow was involved with the program The Restaurant, a reality TV show that aired on NBC in 2003, with a second season broadcasting in 2004. The show was produced by Mark Burnett and starred celebrity chef Rocco DiSpirito. The show portrayed the opening and running of a Manhattan restaurant and ongoing conflicts between DiSpirito and Chodorow, usually revolving around the lack of the restaurant's profitability. The show was canceled, Chodorow, the restaurant's financier, successfully sued DiSpirito to shut the restaurant down and DiSpirito was banned from entering the premises.

Chodorow opened the Asia de Cuba restaurant at the Schrager Morgans Hotel. He also owns China Grill Management, a collection of restaurants, several which are also in Schrager hotels.

In a full-page ad taken out in the February 21, 2007 dining section of The New York Times, Chodorow declared figurative war on critic Frank Bruni for giving him a poor review. The ad said the review was a personal attack and that he would follow up Bruni's reviews with visits to the restaurant, with his own review to follow on his blog.

On February 15, 2011, Sam Sifton of The New York Times reviewed Chodorow's newest restaurant Bar Basque, giving high marks to the food and trashing the decor and ambiance.
