= Airways International Cymru =

Airline based in Wales

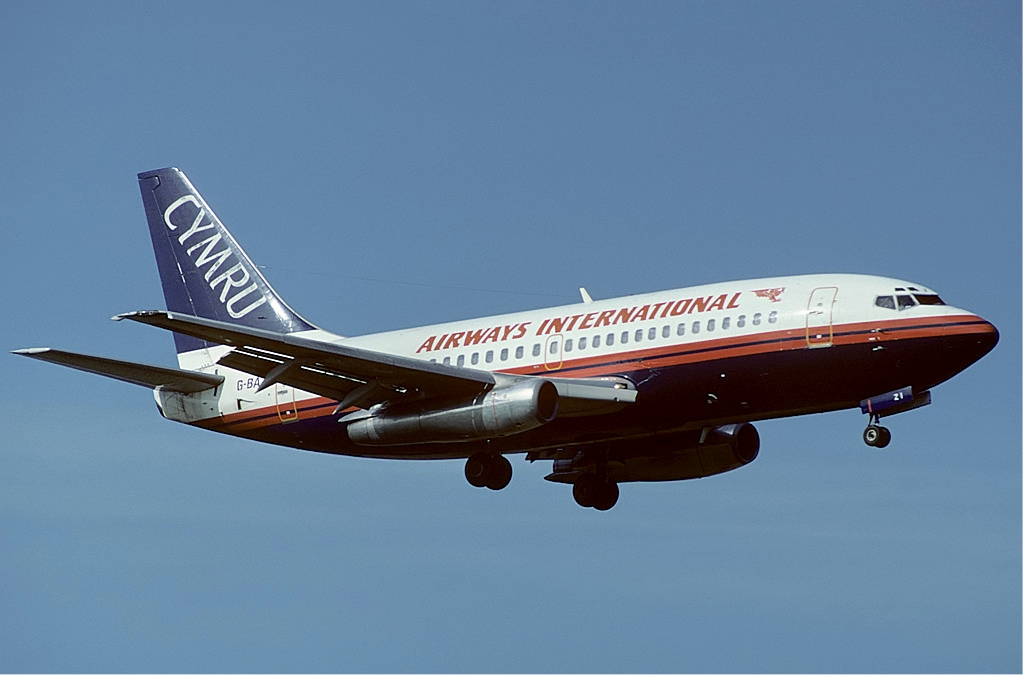
- Boeing 737-200
IATA	ICAO	Call sign
AK	CYM	WELSHAIR
- Founded: 1983
- Commenced operations: April 1984
- Ceased operations: January 1988
- Operating bases: Cardiff
- Fleet size: 7
- Destinations: 23
- Parent company: Red Dragon Travel
- Headquarters: Cardiff, Wales

Airways International Cymru was an airline based in Cardiff, Wales formed by Red Dragon Travel, at the time a leading Welsh travel agency and tour operator. It commenced operations in early 1984, and ceased all operations in early 1988 after financial difficulties arising from the lease of an aircraft to an American airline.

== History ==
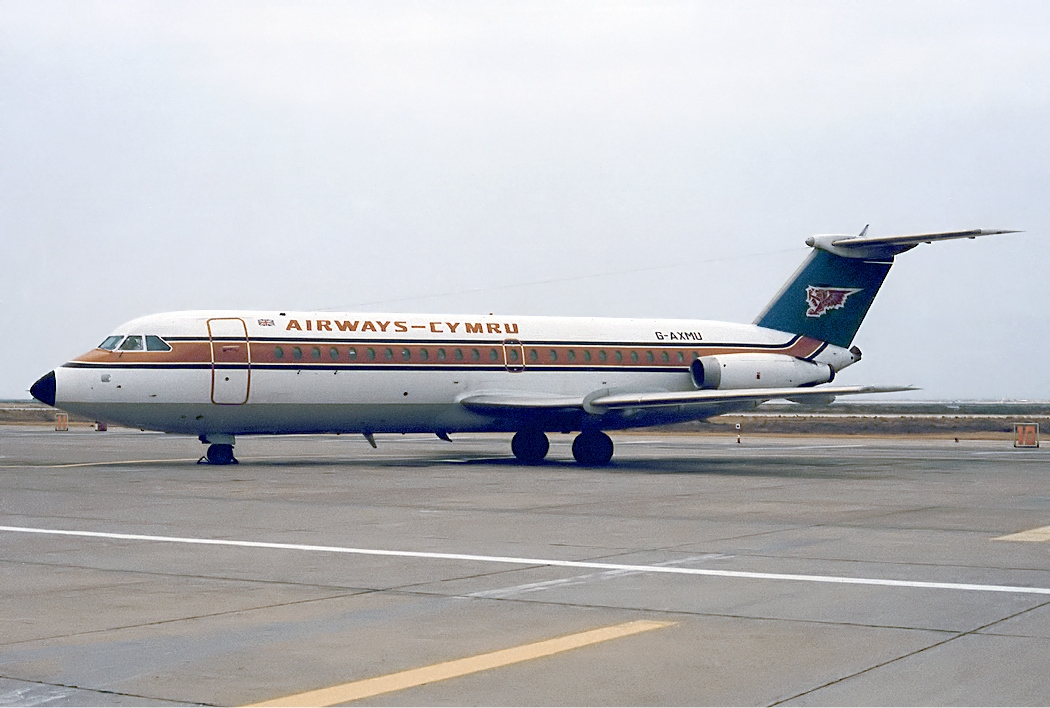
BAC1-11 at Faro Airport

The airline was founded by Tony Clemo, Brian Proctor, and David Whiteman, and was based in Cardiff, Wales. Their first flight was on 13 April 1984 to Malaga. The company started operations with a single British Aircraft Corporation BAC One-Eleven (BAC 1-11-300) G-YMRU purchased from Quebecair of Canada. For the first summer season of operations it also leased a BAC 1-11-400 G-AXMU from British airline British Island Airways. Later in 1984 it introduced a further BAC 1-11-300 G-WLAD purchased from Quebecair as a replacement for the British Island Airways aircraft.

In 1985 it introduced an ex Britannia Airways Boeing 737-200 G-BAZI leased from GPA.

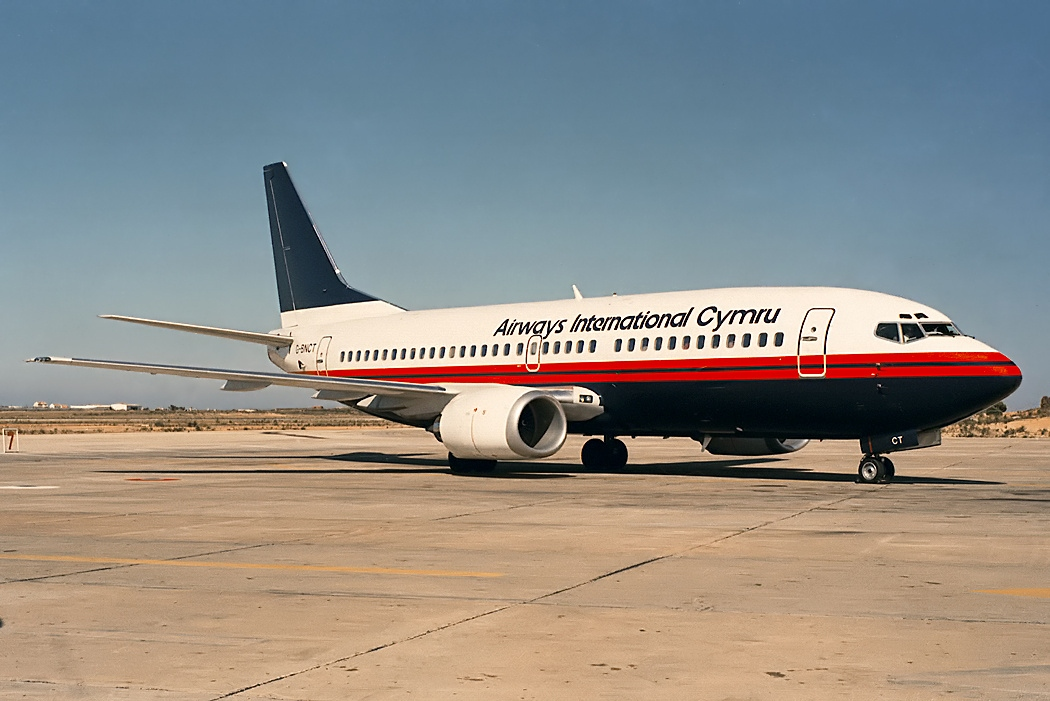
Boeing 737-300 in 1987.

In 1986 it received its first Boeing 737-300 G-PROC, and this was used to expand destinations to popular holiday spots throughout Europe. The company had earned half a million pounds in profit by their second year in business. It was during 1986 that the chairman, Clemo began having difficulties with the other cofounders. He claimed that Proctor had used overseas investment accounts to fund the airline's foundation, and had lied to him about owning them. After several disputed over this issue, Clemo left the board in November 1986, but remained as a 25% shareholder. He attempted to sue the company in 1987 over the use of overseas investment to found the airline, but was unsuccessful.

In 1987 the company received a new Boeing 737-300 G-BNCT. Additional contracts saw the lease of a further Boeing 737-300 G-PROK for the summer of 1987. The airline was awarded Thompson Holiday's Certificate of Excellence for their in flight service during the summer 1987 tourist season. The airline intended to expand into the travel agency business during 1987, and purchased the travel firm Tour Reps. The company was renamed to Airways Holidays, and they began sending promotional material out to travel agencies in December.

Airways International Cymru attempted to block Inter European Airways licence application in May 1987, claiming that South Wales didn't have enough business to support two separate airlines. The judge ruled against them and Inter European Airways opened the same month.

Throughout the airline's history, the operational fleet was reduced during the winter months by leasing out of aircraft to other operators. These included Air New Zealand, Aer Lingus, British Midland Airways and Manx Airlines. The airline also loaned out a Piper Navajo to St John Ambulance Wales that was used to transport blood, medicines, and transplant organs.

=== Lease contract disputes ===
In 1987, a Boeing 737-300 was leased to an American airline, SunCoast Airlines for $67,000 a week. The lease was for a six month period. Disagreements around the contract became a major issue for both airlines, after SunCoast Airlines claimed the plane was supposed to arrive in November, but was instead delivered in December without the paperwork needed to register with the Federal Aviation Administration (FAA). SunCoast's chairman alleged that Airways International Cymru repeatedly told them that they had filed the paperwork with the FAA, only for SunCoast to discover that it had never been filed. SunCoast said the contract caused them millions of dollars in losses.

Airways International Cymru claimed that SunCoast was late paying a $55,000 insurance deposit, causing the delay in the plane's delivery. They also believed that SunCoast was responsible for FAA registration.

In January 1988, SunCoast filed for Chapter 11 bankruptcy. This caused the plane to be grounded, and meant Airways International Cymru couldn't reclaim the plane without going through court proceedings. Following the plane's grounding SunCoast sued Airways International Cymru for $301,725 in damages.

On 4 January 1988, Airways International Cymru attempted to repossess the plane by driving it off SunCoast property. SunCoast claims Airways International Cymru staff entered the airport's security area, before gaining access to the grounded plane. The aircraft began taxiing down the airfield, meeting the directors of Airways International Cymru at the other end of the runway. Police intervened, causing staff to return the plane to SunCoast's ramp. SunCoast declined to press charges related to the incident. Airways International Cymru claimed they weren't aware that taking the aircraft was a crime, as they weren't familiar with US laws. The whole incident took an hour, and SunCoast believed that had the staff not been disrupted, they would have attempted to fly the aircraft back to Wales. However Airways International Cymru hadn't filed any flight plans.

SunCoast was court ordered to return the plane, or resume payments.

During this time, Airways International Cymru was in debt with the leaseholders of their other planes. This caused G-CYMRU to be grounded in Luton Airport. Their other planes had also been grounded, and the airline said they were attempting to either lease four new planes, or recover their existing ones. Paramount Airways Limited took over Airways International Cymru's flights, using their own planes but landing at Cardiff Airport, so travel was not disrupted for customers.

The company stopped flying on 19 January and went into receivership in February, and 150 people lost their jobs.

== Destinations ==
Airways International Cymru served 20 destinations across Europe (during operations).

- Austria
  - Salzburg – Salzburg Airport
- France
  - Paris – Orly Airport
- Germany
  - Düsseldorf – Düsseldorf Airport
  - Hanover – Hanover Airport
- Netherlands
  - Rotterdam – Rotterdam Airport
- Italy
  - Milan – Milan Malpensa Airport
  - Rome
- Portugal
  - Faro – Faro Airport
- Spain
  - Girona – Girona-Costa Brava Airport
  - Gran Canaria – Gran Canaria Airport
  - Palma de Mallorca – Palma de Mallorca Airport
  - Tenerife – Tenerife South Airport
- Switzerland
  - Basel – EuroAirport Basel-Mulhouse-Freiburg
  - Geneva – Geneva Cointrin Airport
- United Kingdom
  - Aberdeen - Aberdeen Airport
  - Birmingham – Birmingham Airport
  - Bristol – Bristol Airport
  - Cardiff – Cardiff Airport, base
  - East Midlands – East Midlands Airport
  - Edinburgh - Edinburgh Airport
  - Exeter – Exeter Airport
  - Glasgow - Glasgow Airport
  - London – Gatwick Airport
  - Southend-on-Sea – Southend Airport

== See also ==
- List of defunct airlines of the United Kingdom
