= Midway Airlines (1976–1991) =

Airline of the United States (1976–1991)

IATA	ICAO	Call sign
ML	MDW	MIDWAY
- Founded: October 13, 1976
- Commenced operations: November 1, 1979
- Ceased operations: November 13, 1991
- Hubs: Chicago–Midway; Philadelphia
- Frequent-flyer program: FlyersFirst
- Headquarters: Chicago, Illinois
- Key people: David R. Hinson (CEO)
- Founders: Kenneth T. Carlson; Irving T. Tague; William B. Owens

Midway Airlines was an airline in the United States based in Chicago, Illinois. It was incorporated on October 13, 1976, by Kenneth T. Carlson, Irving T. Tague and William B. Owens, filing with the Civil Aeronautics Board (CAB) for an airline operating certificate. Although it received its operating certificate from the CAB prior to the passage of the Airline Deregulation Act in 1978, it was viewed as the first post-deregulation start-up. The airline commenced operations on November 1, 1979.

The airline was notable for breathing new life into Chicago Midway Airport, which was almost deserted when Midway started operations. The carrier was also notable for pursuing at least three distinct business models during its existence, starting as a discount carrier, then transitioning to an all business-class airline before evolving into a more conventional hub carrier.

Midway was never highly or consistently profitable, but unlike many bigger and/or more prominent airlines (e.g. Braniff, People Express, Western Airlines and Piedmont Airlines) which disappeared through bankruptcy or mergers, it survived the 1980s. Unfortunately, the carrier collapsed soon after attempting to grow substantially by purchasing the Philadelphia hub of bankrupt Eastern Air Lines, filing Chapter 11 bankruptcy in March 1991. A deal was struck to sell the company to Northwest Airlines, which backed out at the last minute, leading to Midway's ultimate shutdown in November 1991.

A group of investors, including Carlson, bought the airline's name (for $20,000) and started another Midway Airlines, which flew from 1993 to 2003.

== History ==
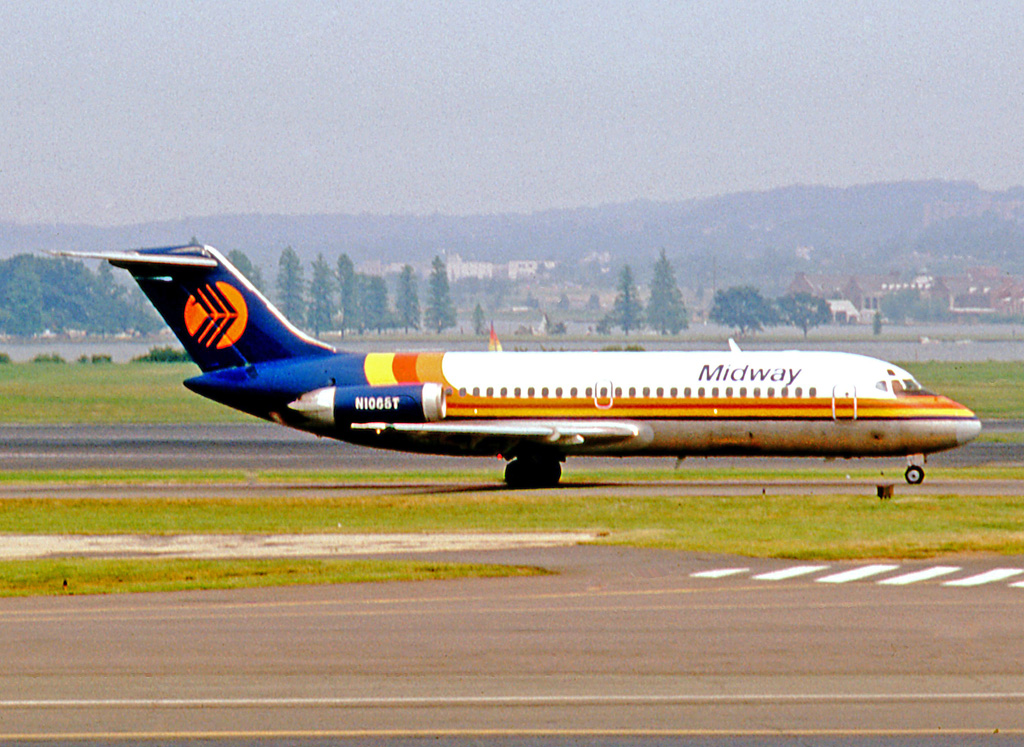
DC-9-15 in the original livery

=== June 1976: Representative Fary and Lamar Muse ===
In June 1976, Lamar Muse, founding president of Southwest Airlines, testified to Congress. Representative John G. Fary, whose district contained Midway Airport, asked if Muse had any ideas how to revive the airport, then “virtually a ghost town”. Muse said, in part, “…you could do exactly the same thing at Midway that Southwest has done at Love Field in Dallas…” Muse said he discussed this idea in the offices of airline consultants Simat, Helliesen & Eichner (SH&E), where partner John Eichner was a friend of Muse. Two other SH&E consultants took the idea to former Hughes Airwest executive Irving Tague and incorporated Midway Airlines (October 13, 1976) to be first in line with the CAB with this idea. Founder Kenneth Carlson was in fact an SH&E vice president immediately prior to starting Midway Airlines. In response, Muse created a subsidiary, Midway (Southwest) Airway Co., which also applied to the CAB. Muse wanted to connect Midway Airport to 15 cities about 200–500 miles from Chicago, while Midway Airlines took a smaller list of six cities to the CAB.

Midway Airport was a flashpoint for critics of airline regulation because the CAB-regulated industry failed to resuscitate the airport, a priority for the City of Chicago and the Illinois congressional delegation. Muse said in July 1977 Congressional airline deregulation hearings (when total airline service at Midway was two Delta flights/day) that, based on its experience in Texas, Southwest would, within a year, carry five million passengers per year through Midway with 92 737 departures/weekday (79 per day on weekends). But Southwest's board of directors was not supportive and Midway became a focus of Muse's feud with Southwest founder Rollin King, which led to Muse's resignation from Southwest in March 1978. This helped clear the way for Midway Airlines. Muse accurately predicted Midway's future importance to Southwest: as of March 5, 2024, Southwest scheduled up to 249 departures per day at Midway. Midway Airport reached Muse's predicted five million annual passengers/year in 1987.

=== 1976 – November 1979: extended gestation ===
Midway Airlines' progress from concept to reality reflected the progress of US airline deregulation, for which the inflection point was the high-profile 1975 Senate hearings on the CAB by Senator Ted Kennedy. Prior to these, certification of significant new airline was unthinkable, it hadn't happened in decades. After the hearings, there was a sense of possibility, which is why, in 1976, the idea of Midway Airlines was plausible. In 1977, President Jimmy Carter appointed economist Alfred Kahn to run the CAB with a mandate for reform, changing the nature and tempo of CAB decisions. The Carter administration and Congress were in favor of opening up Midway Airport to low-cost air travel. The CAB announced in August 1977 that it would decide the Midway airport proceeding by August 1978, incredibly fast by prior CAB standards.

The August 1978 CAB ruling (against a backdrop of the Airline Deregulation Act going through Congress) was good news/bad news for Midway Airlines; it got what it wanted but so did everyone. Midway argued to the CAB that it deserved (as the self-proclaimed innovator) Midway Airport to itself, at least for a time, to become established. But the CAB noted Southwest might be the innovator (see prior section) and projections showed Southwest to be the low-cost applicant. Nonetheless, Midway, Southwest and local service airline North Central each got all six routes and Northwest and Delta got the select Midway routes they asked for. In addition, Midway and the Southwest Midway subsidiary were both given economic certification as well. Further, the CAB opened another proceeding for another 24 Midway Airport routes. Given what looked like substantial future service at Midway Airport, there were serious doubt Midway Airlines would attract sufficient investment.

However, only Midway Airlines made subsequent moves toward Midway Airport, because as of January 1979, deregulation opened up the entire United States to airline competition. While Southwest continued to participate in Midway CAB cases, it took no practical steps towards service: Southwest would not enter Midway until 1985. Even with the way relatively clear, Midway Airlines found it hard to raise money, Chicago investors were generally uninterested. On August 2, 1979, Midway announced it had raised $5.7mm from 16 private investors, allowing the airline to head towards a November 1, 1979 launch. In September 1979, the CAB gave 15 airlines the right to fly those other 24 routes from Midway. One was Federal Express, having obtained Boeing 737-200QC aircraft with which it wanted to fly packages at night and passengers during the day. This was FedEx's “Project Torso”, in which FedEx founder Fred Smith briefly considered the idea of passenger service. At the time, FedEx had a highly profitable monopoly on overnight delivery growing at 40% per year. Ultimately, none of the 15, other than Midway, used this broad new authority.

Midway Airlines Financial Results, 1980 thru 1990
(USD mm)	1980	1981	1982	1983	1984	1985	1986	1987	1988	1989	1990
Op revenue	25.0	73.9	94.7	103.3	148.0	193.4	261.4	340.7	388.0	463.0	614.8
Op profit (loss)		8.8	4.5	(12.3)	(13.0)	0.9	11.1	25.0	13.5	(13.5)	(84.5)
Net profit (loss)	(5.0)	7.6	0.3	(15.0)	(22.0)	(3.6)	9.0	19.8	6.5	(21.7)	(139.2)
Op margin		11.9%	4.7%	−11.9%	−8.7%	0.4%	4.2%	7.3%	3.5%	−2.9%	−13.7%
Net margin	−20.2%	10.2%	0.4%	−14.5%	−14.8%	−1.9%	3.5%	5.8%	1.7%	−4.7%	−22.6%

=== November 1979 – July 1982: original no-frills business model ===
Midway started on November 1, 1979, on three routes: Detroit, Cleveland and Kansas City. Midway's original business model remained inspired by Southwest, but instead of Southwest's 118-seat 737s, Midway started with three 83-seat DC-9-10s. Midway's fares were below those of conventional competitors at O’Hare, and no onboard catering was offered. In 1980, it expanded to five DC-9-10s. The airline ran unconventional offers such as penny sales, offering the return trip at a penny with the outbound at the usual fare to fill up off-peak days. At times this caused chaos as customers rushed to the airport to buy such tickets. Still, the strategy worked; Midway was solidly profitable in 1981 (see nearby table), in only its second full year of operation. The 1981 operating margin was the highest full-year operating margin Midway would ever attain.

Early Midway was marked by significant management turnover. Some founders (like Carlson) were gone by 1980 and in early 1982, Irving Tague took a leave of absence for “personal reasons,” with David Hinson becoming acting chair. Gordon Linkon, formerly of Frontier Airlines, was made President in 1980, embracing the low-cost ethic. Midway went public in December 1980, 850,000 shares at $13.50. But the board was dissatisfied by the airline's discount image and some of those promotions. Chicago was particularly badly affected by the extended disruption caused by the August 1981 air traffic controllers strike. United Airlines grounded 50 aircraft, and Midway found itself unable to fully employ eight DC-9-30s it acquired from Ansett Australia. A new Boston route failed in the face of severe competition. Consequently, results for the first quarter of 1982 were poor, as with the rest of the industry. In a long-planned move, directors fired Linkon in July 1982, shortly after Midway achieved a profitable second quarter, one in which most of the industry made a loss.

=== July 1982 – Spring 1985: Metrolink and Midway Express ===
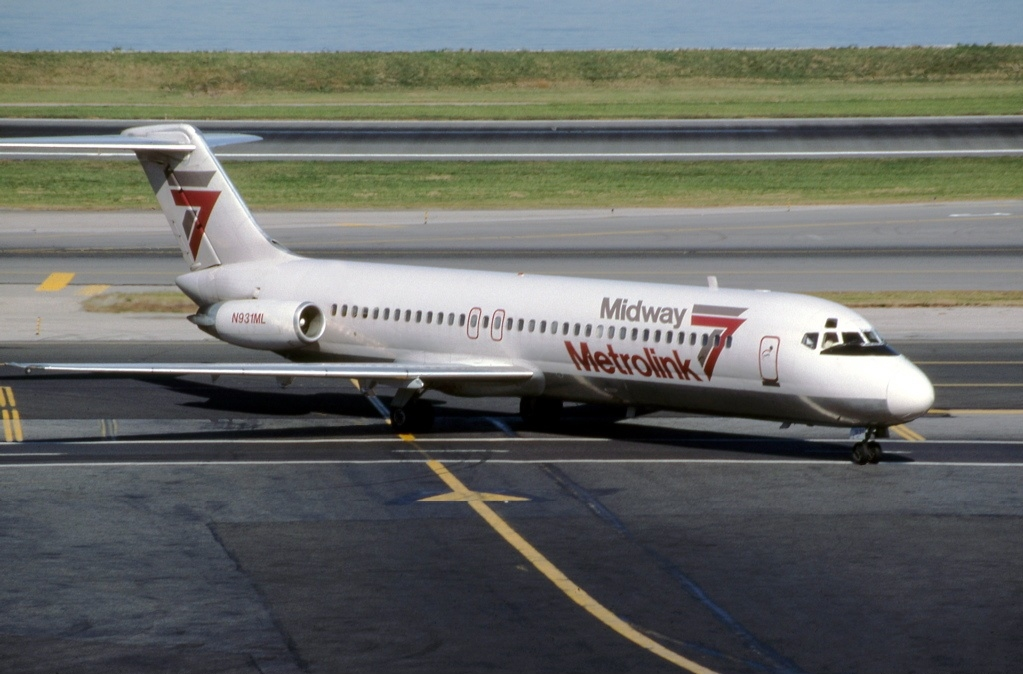
Metrolink DC-9-31 New York LaGuardia October 1984

New Midway Chair/CEO Arthur Bass was part of the founding management, and a former president, of Federal Express. Bass hired Neal Meehan, founding CEO of New York Air, as president. They aimed to make Midway Airport the favored airport of the Chicago business traveler, similar to New York LaGuardia or Dallas Love Field. At that time, Midway Airport had no jetways and suffered from a lack of maintenance on the part of the city. Bass and Meehan instituted Midway Metrolink branded all-business class service, with four-abreast seating, a “business center” at Midway airport, jetways and other amenities. Florida service, which Linkon initiated, was dropped.

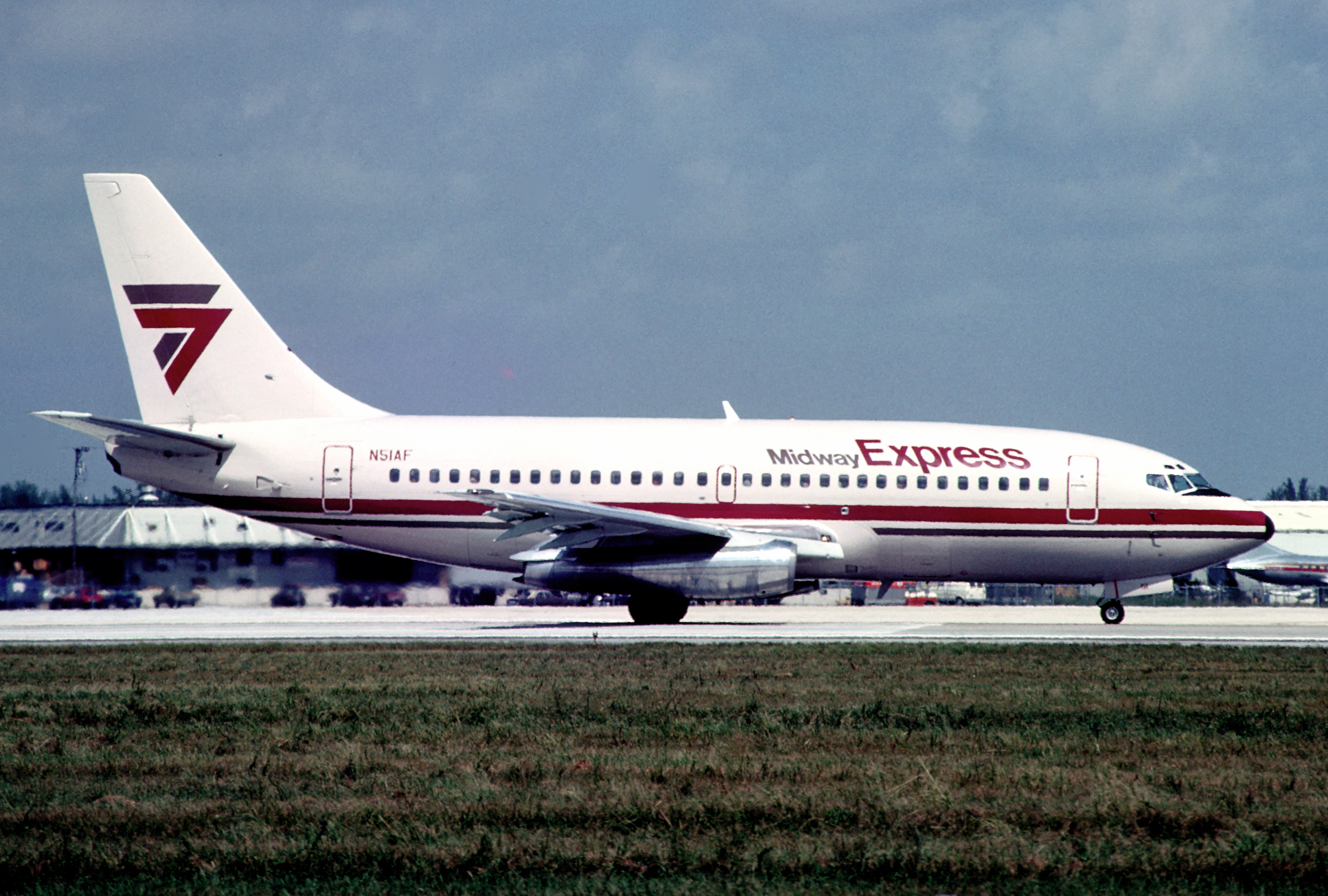
Midway Express 737-200 at Miami, October 1984

The Metrolink operation proved to be a failure. 1983 and 1984 financial results were poor, with losses greatly exceeding the cumulative profits of 1981 and 1982. In 1984, reacting to a proposal from Air Florida executives, Midway acquired the remains of that bankrupt carrier in stages. The two primary motivations for the acquisition were winter demand to offset the seasonality of the Metrolink system, and Air Florida's slots at airports like LaGuardia and Washington National. The deal nominally cost Midway $53 million, most of that ($35 million) for three Air Florida 737-200 aircraft. In fact, Midway never paid for the airplanes, passing them to a lessor to purchase and leasing them back. Midway provided working capital to get the remains of Air Florida back in the air in October 1984, which flew under contract to Midway (with Midway marketing and selling tickets) as Midway Express until August 1985, when the Air Florida purchase closed and Midway Express shifted to full Midway Airlines branding.

Florida service was much more successful. In Midway's 1985 annual report, the airline said Midway Express made a profit of $1.4mm for Midway pre-merger. Money-losing Metrolink service made even less sense alongside profitable all-economy class Florida service. 1984 results also included a $1.5mm writeoff for an expensive abortive attempt to establish a helicopter service between Midway, O’Hare and Meigs Field, to be called Chicago Airlink. In January 1985, Bass resigned, followed by Meehan in February, with David Hinson, a Midway founder and founding board member, taking over. The airline announced cutbacks and layoffs (Midway Express was unaffected) and discontinued Metrolink. In May, Hinson warded off an attempted proxy fight by other (departed) founders, including Carlson, wanting to return the airline to its original business model. At the time of Bass's departure, Hinson defended Metrolink, but one of Midway's responses against dissident shareholders was to note that the Bass team was gone.

=== Mid-1985 – June 1989: profitability as a conventional airline ===
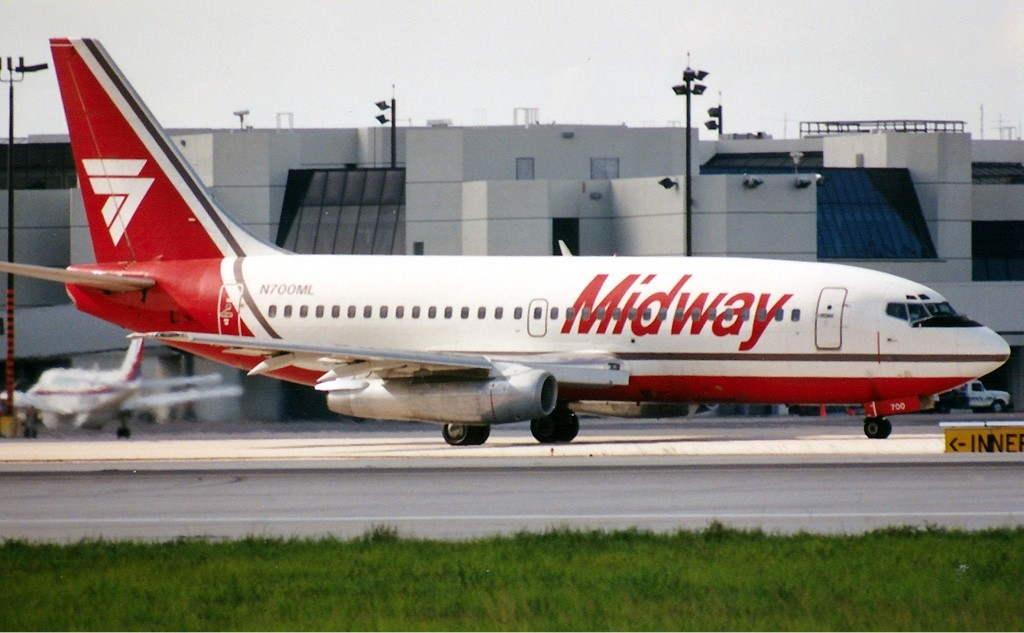
Midway Airlines Boeing 737-200

Hinson wanted Midway to be “more like other airlines,” and Midway became a conventional hub airline, the differentiator being Midway Airport. The DC-9s were converted to two-class seating and Midway built out its network to both business and leisure destinations (cities like Las Vegas and Phoenix) from coast to coast. Midway also acquired McDonnell Douglas MD-87s (a smaller, high-performance version of the MD-80) to allow the airline to reach to the west coast, at the time a non-trivial feat from Midway Airport's short runways. Midway acquired its own regional airline subsidiary, Midway Commuter, to fly from Midway to smaller cities around Chicago. 75% of Midway Commuter passengers connected to mainline flights at Midway airport. Midway had its own maintenance facility in Miami (an Air Florida legacy) and built a simulator facility. The strategy produced profits, but margins never challenged those achieved in 1981. However, during this period much larger airlines like Eastern, Pan Am, America West Airlines, Continental, People Express, etc., all saw heavy losses, and other high-profile names like Pacific Southwest Airlines and Western Airlines merged out of existence. Midway stood out just by surviving.

On a June 1988 weekday, Midway scheduled 116 nonstop flights into Midway Airport from 25 cities, along with 75 Midway Connection nonstops from 17 others. The airline flew Chicago Midway (MDW) – Miami (MIA) – Saint Croix (STX) – St. Thomas (STT) round trip as well as Chicago Midway (MDW) – Fort Lauderdale (FLL) – Nassau (NAS) round trip; aside from those, all Chicago flights were nonstop to and from Midway Airport. Midway Airlines′ peak year was 1989, when it flew 10.1 billion revenue passenger-kilometers, compared to 0.6 billion in 1981.

=== June 1989 – November 1991: untimely overextension leads to demise ===
In March 1989 Eastern Air Lines faced a debilitating strike, tipping it into Chapter 11 bankruptcy. As part of Eastern's attempts to raise cash, it sold its Philadelphia gates (and other assets, such as routes to Toronto and Montreal) and 16 DC-9 aircraft to Midway for $210 million in June of that year. Further investment included hiring, refurbishing the aircraft and the former Eastern space in Philadelphia, and heavy marketing to introduce east coast residents to Midway. Hinson's rationale was that Midway was reaching the limits of growth in Chicago, and this was its best opportunity to develop a second hub; operations began on November 15, 1989. The Philadelphia hub was intended to help drive Midway annual revenue to $2 billion within two years. Also in 1989, Midway ordered 29 McDonnell Douglas MD-82s for a nominal $900 million, as well as 33 Dornier 328 turboprops for Midway Connection for a nominal $244 million. It also reintroduced first class on all routes.

Philadelphia had dominant incumbent hub operator, the much larger USAir; at the end of 1989, Midway had 61 aircraft vs 441 for USAir. Fuel prices were up significantly in early 1990 over 1989, while Florida fares dropped significantly. The US entered a recession in July 1990. Iraq invaded Kuwait on August 2, pitching the US into the Gulf War, inducing an oil price shock and an immediate decline in air travel. On October 19, 1990, less than a year after starting the hub, Midway announced it was leaving Philadelphia. A silver lining was that USAir paid Midway $68 million for the former Eastern gates and Canadian routes. Midway's 1990 losses vastly exceeded the sum total of every profitable year Midway ever had, but in fact the previous record loss in 1989 was also due to the Philadelphia operation: Midway had made a small profit in the first three quarters of 1989 before incurring a substantial fourth-quarter loss.

Midway filed for Chapter 11 in March 1991, Hinson describing it as a “minor setback”. In October the bankruptcy court approved a $175 million takeover offer by Northwest Airlines, including assuming remaining aircraft and employees. The court rejected a smaller, $110 million bid by Southwest, which did not offer to take aircraft or employees. Midway lost $36 million since filing Chapter 11, against projected income of $6.5 million, and was down to $4 million in cash. Northwest ran newspaper ads saying customers could book Midway with confidence, but a month after agreeing to the deal, it pulled out, accusing Midway of showing inaccurate revenue figures for 1990 and ostensibly claiming concern about environmental liability at Midway Airport. Northwest had huge debts of its own, having been taken private in a leveraged buyout in 1989. Some believed Northwest saw the Midway deal as risking a simultaneous deal to get funding from the state of Minnesota. Regardless of the reason, Midway ceased flying November 13, 1991.

== Legacy ==
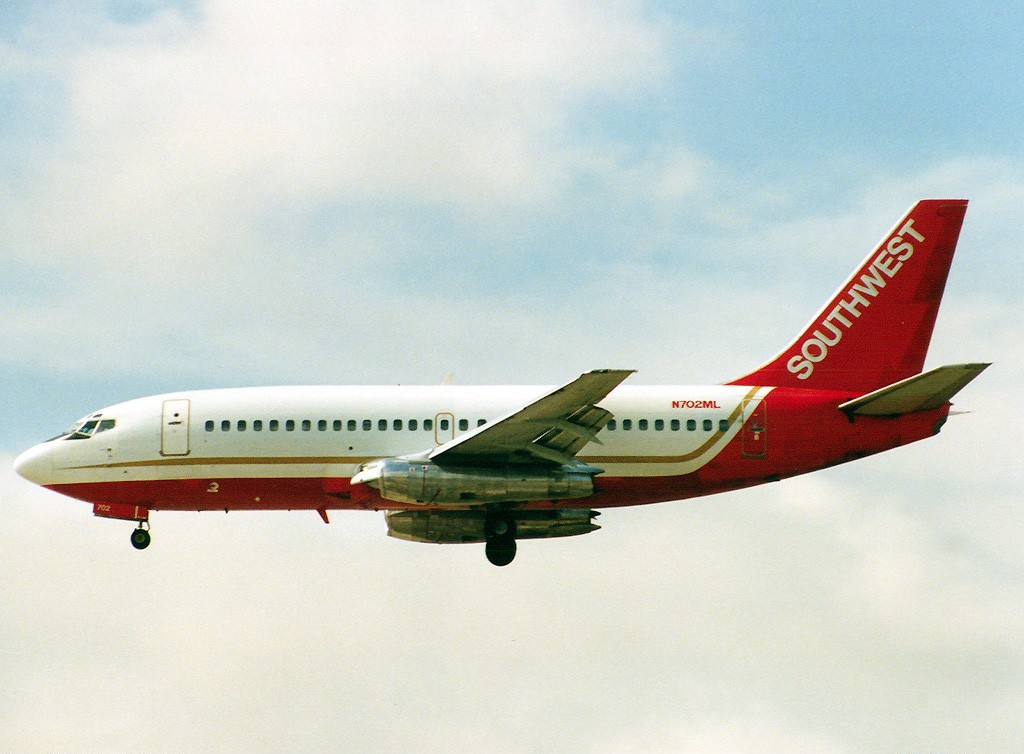
As the hybrid livery attests, Southwest picked up some ex-Midway aircraft

Having let Midway collapse, Northwest faced significant political anger in Chicago. In contrast, Southwest achieved local goodwill by restoring some service and hiring a number of former Midway employees. Midway Airlines had long proved there was a market at Midway Airport; Southwest wanted to add more Midway service but was constrained by a need to address other opportunities. In the early 1990s, USAir and American Airlines cut back most of their California networks, inherited from Pacific Southwest Airlines and AirCal respectively, and Southwest grew its planned 1991 fleet expansion plan from 11 to 18 aircraft in response (to a total of 124). 1991 also marked the bankruptcy of America West Airlines and its subsequent reduction in capacity in Phoenix, where Southwest and America West were fierce rivals, opening up yet more opportunity. Nonetheless, that moment marked the beginning of Southwest's dominance at Midway Airport. As of March 2024, Southwest's Midway market share was over 85%.

In 1987, David Hinson said that the key to Midway's survival was staying small and keeping out of the way of the big carriers. About the airline business he said, “if you are careful and prudent, you can survive and do relatively well.” As the Philadelphia strategy turned sour, David Hinson repeatedly defended Midway as being the victim of circumstance. The circumstances facing the US airline business in the early 1990s were indeed poor, as reflected in deep industry losses during this period. The 1989 decision to bulk up Midway and attack the much larger USAir directly contradicted Hinson's earlier remarks, and largely contributed to the airline's demise.

After Midway Airlines, David Hinson went on to work for McDonnell Douglas and served as the head of the Federal Aviation Administration under President Bill Clinton.

Gordon Linkon, the president who achieved Midway's highest annual operating margin in 1981, went on to found Florida Express.

A group of investors bought the Midway Airlines name and started a new airline using the name in 1993. The new Midway Airlines went bankrupt and ceased operations in 2003.

== Destinations ==
Canada

- Montreal (Montréal-Dorval International Airport)
- Toronto (Toronto Pearson International Airport)

Caribbean

- Nassau (Lynden Pindling International Airport)
- St. Croix (Henry E. Rohlsen Airport)
- St. Thomas (Cyril E. King Airport)

United States

- Albany (Albany International Airport)
- Atlanta (Hartsfield–Jackson Atlanta International Airport)
- Boston (Logan International Airport)
- Chicago (Chicago Midway International Airport) – Hub
- Cincinnati/Northern Kentucky (Cincinnati/Northern Kentucky International Airport)
- Cleveland (Cleveland Burke Lakefront Airport)
- Cleveland (Cleveland Hopkins International Airport)
- Columbus (Port Columbus International Airport)
- Dallas/Fort Worth (Dallas/Fort Worth International Airport)
- Denver (Stapleton International Airport)
- Des Moines (Des Moines International Airport)
- Detroit (Detroit Metropolitan Wayne County Airport)
- Fort Lauderdale/Hollywood (Fort Lauderdale – Hollywood International Airport)
- Fort Myers (Southwest Florida International Airport)
- Hartford (Bradley International Airport)
- Indianapolis (Indianapolis International Airport)
- Jacksonville (Jacksonville International Airport)
- Kansas City (Kansas City International Airport)
- Las Vegas (McCarran International Airport)
- Lincoln (Lincoln Airport (Nebraska)
- Los Angeles (Los Angeles International Airport)
- Louisville (Louisville International Airport)
- Memphis (Memphis International Airport)
- Miami (Miami International Airport)
- Milwaukee (Milwaukee Mitchell International Airport)
- Minneapolis/St. Paul (Minneapolis-Saint Paul International Airport)
- New Orleans (Louis Armstrong New Orleans International Airport)
- New York City (LaGuardia Airport)
- Omaha (Eppley Airfield)
- Orange County (John Wayne Airport)
- Orlando (Orlando International Airport)
- Philadelphia (Philadelphia International Airport)
- Phoenix (Phoenix Sky Harbor International Airport)
- Pittsburgh (Pittsburgh International Airport)
- Providence (T. F. Green Airport)
- Sarasota/Bradenton (Sarasota-Bradenton International Airport)
- St. Louis (Lambert-St. Louis International Airport)
- St. Petersburg/Clearwater (St. Petersburg-Clearwater International Airport)
- Tampa (Tampa International Airport)
- Washington, D.C. (Washington National Airport)
- West Lafayette, Indiana (Purdue University Airport)
- West Palm Beach (Palm Beach International Airport)

== Fleet ==
Midway Airlines historical fleet
Aircraft	Total	Introduced	Retired	Remark
Boeing 737-200	14	1985	1991	
McDonnell Douglas DC-9-14	1	1979	1991	
McDonnell Douglas DC-9-15	8	1979	1991	
McDonnell Douglas DC-9-31	38	1981	1991	
McDonnell Douglas DC-9-32	17	1984	1991	
McDonnell Douglas MD-81	2	1983	1985	N10028, N10029
McDonnell Douglas MD-82	4	1990	1991	N809ML, N810ML, N811ML, N812ML
McDonnell Douglas MD-83	3	1990	1991	N905ML, N906ML, N907ML
McDonnell Douglas MD-87	8	1989	1991	
McDonnell Douglas MD-88	2	1990	1991	N903ML, N904ML

== Midway Commuter ==
In 1987 Midway Airlines purchased commuter air carrier Fischer Brothers Aviation based in Galion, Ohio, and moved the entire operation to Springfield, Illinois. Fischer Brothers Aviation had previously operated Allegheny Commuter service for Allegheny Airlines and successor USAir and then began operating Northwest Airlink service on behalf of Northwest Airlines. The initial move consisted of the Fischer Brothers management team (including Vice President of Operations Armando Cardenas, Chief Pilot Mark Zweidinger, Vice President of Customer Service Mark Fisher, Director of Maintenance Craig Anderson and Personnel Manager Cynthia Baldwin) and was led by Midway Airlines executive Richard Pfennig. Offers of employment were extended to the pilots and maintenance team that wanted to relocate. Gordon Jones, Vice President of Maintenance and Jerry Turpstra, Chief Inspector joined the management group in June 1987. Mr. Pfennig took control of the operation and was able to quickly get the company through certification flights. In May 1987 the commuter started scheduled passenger flights. The initial operation consisted of 21 employees, the original seven Dornier 228 turboprop aircraft and eventually ended with 125 employees, 28 Dornier aircraft and 13 Embraer EMB-120 Brasilia turboprop aircraft. Midway Connection operated to cities in the Midwest states, including Wisconsin (Milwaukee, Madison, Green Bay, Oshkosh), Michigan (Traverse City, Grand Rapids, Muskegeon, Lansing, Kalamazoo), Indiana (South Bend, Ft. Wayne, Indianapolis, West Lafayette), Illinois (Bloomington, Champaign, Moline-Quad Cities, Peoria and their home base Springfield, Illinois), and Ohio (Toledo). This Midway Connection service was a wholly owned subsidiary of Midway Airlines, and although it was an independent operation, it was completely operated as a "feeder" for the "mainline" operation via a code sharing agreement. Dispatch and maintenance for the airline was conducted in Springfield, Illinois, while reservations were supported through Midway Airlines in Chicago utilizing the SABRE reservations system.

== Iowa Airways ==
Iowa Airways also operated Midway Connection code share service and in 1989 was flying nonstop between Midway Airport and Benton Harbor, Flint, and Kalamazoo in Michigan, Dubuque in Iowa and Elkhart in Indiana with Embraer EMB-110 Bandeirante turboprops.

== Accidents and incidents ==
Midway Airlines had no aircraft accidents, However, a plane that was once owned by Midway Airlines would later crash in 2005 as Bellview Airlines Flight 210

Midway Connection had only 3 minor incidents and 2 large bird strike incidents. During initial FAA flight proving runs, a cabin door on the Dornier 228 aircraft opened in flight and struck the tail of the aircraft. The aircraft sustained minor damage and returned to Springfield, Illinois. The door was found in a field later that month.

During a passenger flight, a repair of the previous tail damage came loose inflight and departed the aircraft. The damage was found during inspection by the first officer for the next flight. During engine start up procedures, a parking brake was left engaged on a Dornier 228 aircraft. The FAA determined that braking pressure had bled out from one of the main landing gear brakes. The over-riding parking brake valve prohibited the pilot from being able to actuate the pilot brakes causing the aircraft to yaw and strike one of the other nearby parked aircraft.

Midway Connection had two bird strike incidents involving geese. The first incident involved a goose striking the inner wing between the engine and the fuselage. During the incident the bird was also struck by the propeller and a portion of the carcass was thrown through the passenger window striking a passenger. The second involved a goose striking one of the landing gear sponsons causing substantial damage to the fairing and structure.

== Frequent flyer program ==
Midway operated a frequent flyer program called FlyersFirst. Upon cessation of service, the program ended and mileage credits were not transferred to any other program.

== See also ==
- List of defunct airlines of the United States
