= Tikal Jets Airlines =

Guatemalan airline

| IATA | ICAO | Call sign |
|---|---|---|
| WU | TKC | Tikal |
- Founded: 1992
- Ceased operations: August 31, 2006
- Hubs: La Aurora Int'l Airport
- Focus cities: Mundo Maya Int'l Airport
- Fleet size: 3
- Destinations: 7
- Parent company: Tikal Jets S.A.
- Headquarters: Guatemala City, Guatemala
- Website: www.tikaljets.com

Tikal Jets Airlines was an airline based in Guatemala, which was operational between 1992 and 2006.

== History ==
Tikal Jets Airlines started operations in 1992. In November 1998 it changed ownership to become the Guatemalan National Airline. At that time Tikal Jets had been very successful with constant growth, becoming one of the leading businesses in Guatemala. It had been able to acquire modern and larger airplanes such as McDonnell Douglas DC-9 jets. Tikal Jets Airlines can be considered Central America's first low-cost carrier. It officially ceased operations on August 31, 2006.

In a letter, the President of Tikal Jets Airlines stated:

"Dear Friends:

With much regret and sadness, we inform you that from August 31, 2006, Tikal Jets Airlines, will be canceling all its air operations, as the Guatemalan airline. This decision was made, because we did not find all the necessary conditions to be developed as an Airline. Tikal Jets Airlines has rented its 3 DC9 airplanes to a South American airline, for a period of three years. We want to assure and guarantee you that all your passengers and reservations will be protected with another airlines in Guatemala that also has the operation Guatemala – Flores – Guatemala.

TIKAL JETS AIRLINES, really wants to thank you for the confidence you had about us, during all this years we worked together."

== Previous destinations ==
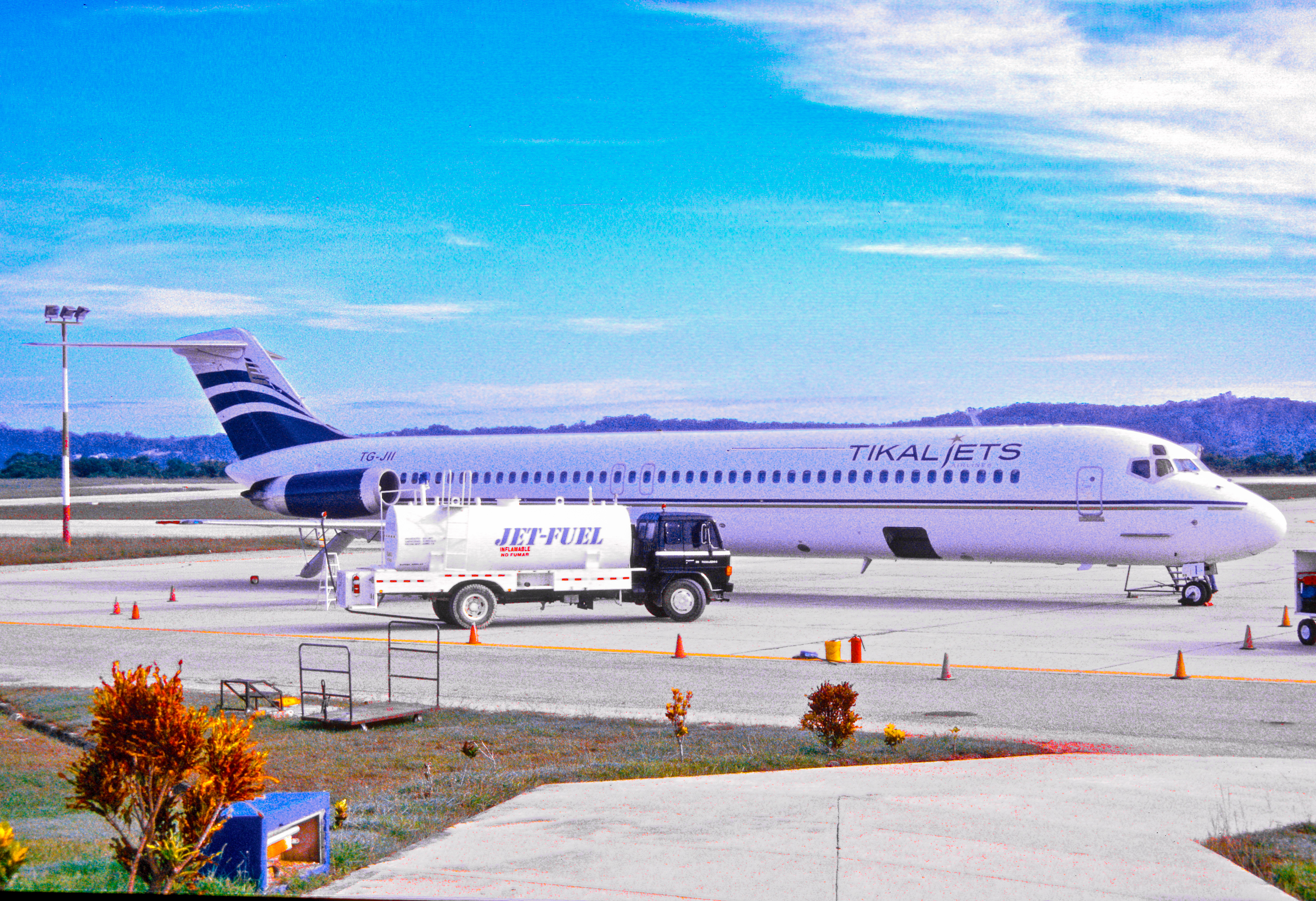
Tikal Jets Airline DC-9-51 (TG-JII)

Guatemala

- Flores (Mundo Maya International Airport)
- Guatemala City (La Aurora International Airport)

Mexico

- Cancún (Cancún International Airport)
- Mexico City (Mexico City International Airport)

Cuba

- Havana (José Martí International Airport)

Nicaragua

- Managua (Augusto C. Sandino International Airport)

Honduras

- San Pedro Sula (Ramon Villeda Morales International Airport)

== Fleet ==

As of August 2006 the Tikal Jets Airlines fleet included:

Jet aircraft

- 2 British Aircraft Corporation BAC One-Eleven
- 2 McDonnell Douglas DC-9-51
- 1 McDonnell Douglas DC-9-32

Turboprop aircraft

- 3 Let L-410 UVP
- 1 Short 330
