= Emerald Air (United States) =

Airline of the United States (1978–1991)

IATA	ICAO	Call sign
OD	—	—
- Commenced operations: 1978; 48 years ago
- Ceased operations: 1991; 35 years ago
- Hubs: Robert Mueller Municipal Airport
- Fleet size: 5 Douglas DC-9; Fairchild Hiller FH-227 Fairchild F-27
- Destinations: Columbus, Ohio; Houston, Texas; see Independent operations below
- Headquarters: Austin, Texas, United States

Emerald Air was an airline headquartered in Austin, Texas, United States. Founded by William Ford and Richard Martel, it was formerly known as Emerald Valley Airlines which in 1981 was flying wholly within the state of Texas with scheduled passenger service to Austin, Houston, McAllen and San Antonio. Emerald Airlines' brief history is marked by arrangements to feed connecting flights into both passenger airlines (such as Continental Airlines and Pan Am) and cargo airlines (such as Purolator Courier) much larger route systems. The airline also independently operated scheduled passenger flights within the state of Texas during the mid 1980s with Douglas DC-9-10 jet and Fairchild Hiller FH-227 turboprop aircraft and briefly served Oklahoma City, Oklahoma and later Wichita, Kansas and Omaha, Nebraska as well.

== Operations for Purolator Courier ==
Emerald began operating scheduled cargo flights, which fed Purolator Courier's Columbus, Ohio hub, in October 1978.

== Operations for Pan American World Airways (Pan Am) ==
In June 1981, the airline began scheduled Douglas DC-9-10 jet service as well as Fairchild Hiller FH-227 turboprop service to feed Pan American World Airways (Pan Am) flights at Houston Intercontinental Airport (IAH) via a code sharing agreement. Emerald was promoted in print advertising by the carriers as 'Emerald the Pan Am Express.' and operated flights on behalf of Pan Am between Houston and Austin, Corpus Christi, McAllen and San Antonio in Texas.

== Operations for Continental Airlines ==
For a brief time in the mid 1980s, Emerald Air operated a connecting jet shuttle service on behalf of Continental Airlines between Houston Intercontinental Airport (IAH) and Houston Hobby Airport (HOU), which was called the 'Houston Proud Express.' Unlike the Pan Am operations in which Pan Am markings and aircraft livery were not used, Emerald painted its aircraft to mimic those of Continental Airlines' then present orange colors and scheme. This "cross-town" service in Houston was operated with Douglas DC-9-10 jet aircraft via a code sharing agreement.

== Independent operations ==
Emerald Air also independently operated scheduled passenger flights primarily within the state of Texas and also briefly to Kansas, Nebraska and Oklahoma during the early and mid 1980s. According to an Emerald Air route map dated July 15, 1982 as well as the airline's system timetables dated March 15, 1984 and September 15, 1984, the following cities were served:

- Austin, TX (AUS)
- Corpus Christi, TX (CRP)
- Dallas/Fort Worth, TX (DFW)
- Houston, TX – Hobby Airport (HOU) and Intercontinental Airport (IAH)
- McAllen, TX (MFE)
- Oklahoma City, OK (OKC)
- Omaha, NE (OMA)
- San Antonio, TX (SAT)
- Wichita, KS (ICT)

According to its March 15, 1984 timetable, Emerald Air was flying nonstop service on the following routes: Austin-Houston, Corpus Christi-Dallas/Ft. Worth, Corpus Christi-Houston, Corpus Christi-McAllen, Dallas/Ft. Worth-McAllen, Houston-McAllen, Houston-San Antonio and McAllen-San Antonio. These flights were operated with Douglas DC-9-10 jet and Fairchild Hiller FH-227 turboprop aircraft. Emerald was an intrastate airline in Texas at this time as it was no longer serving Oklahoma City.

In September 1984, Emerald Air then extended its scheduled passenger service north from Dallas/Ft. Worth with a DC-9 jet flight nonstop to Wichita, KS (ICT) with continuing same plane service to Omaha, NE (OMA).

According to the October 1, 1989 edition of the Official Airline Guide (OAG), Emerald Air was operating nonstop DC-9 jet service between Newport News (PHF) and Orlando (MCO) twice a week.

== Bankruptcy and acquisition by BIA-COR Holdings Inc. ==
By 1985, Emerald ceased operations primarily in Texas and filed for Chapter 11 bankruptcy. In 1991, BIA-COR Holdings Inc., acquired Emerald Air's FAA and DOT operating certificate, along with Emerald's three Douglas DC-9-14 aircraft; and renamed the carrier Braniff International Airlines, Inc., before promptly going out of business. Parts of Emerald thus became the third and final resurrection of the Braniff name.

== Fleet ==
Emerald Air operated a small fleet of the following jet and turboprop aircraft types:

- British Aircraft Corporation BAC One-Eleven
- Douglas DC-9-14 / Douglas DC-9-15
- Fairchild Hiller FH-227
- Fairchild F-27

== See also ==
- List of defunct airlines of the United States
