= Braniff (1983–1990) =

American airline (1984–1989)

Braniff, Inc.
IATA	ICAO	Call sign
BN	BNF	BRANIFF
- Founded: December 15, 1983; 42 years ago
- Commenced operations: March 1, 1984; 42 years ago
- Ceased operations: November 6, 1989; 36 years ago
- Hubs: Dallas/Fort Worth International Airport; Kansas City International Airport
- Secondary hubs: Orlando International Airport
- Frequent-flyer program: Metroplex Club, Get It All
- Subsidiaries: Braniff Express
- Fleet size: 57 (as of April 15, 1989)
- Destinations: 40 (as of September 1, 1989)
- Parent company: Dalfort Corporation (until 1988), then BIA-COR Holdings, Inc.
- Headquarters: Dallas, Texas, U.S. then Orlando, Florida, U.S.
- Key people: Jay Pritzker (first CEO); William Slattery (President); William G. McGee (final CEO)

Braniff Inc. was an American airline that operated flights from 1984 until 1989 and was partially formed from the assets of the original Braniff International Airways. The domestic air carrier was originally headquartered at Dallas Love Field in Dallas, Texas, and later Orlando, Florida. The airline is popularly referred to as "Braniff II".

== History ==
=== Hyatt Corporation and Dalfort ===
In 1984, the Hyatt Corporation reorganized Braniff, Inc.'s successor Braniff International Corporation the holding company of Braniff Airways, Inc., and the airline flew once again using the Braniff name. Jay Pritzker, of Hyatt Hotels, masterminded the reorganization of the original Braniff International Airways (BIA) and successfully brought the airline out of bankruptcy on December 15, 1983. The new entity was commenced with a total capitalization of US$100 million (70 million from Hyatt and 30 million in Airways' assets) and virtually no debt. Braniff Airways, Inc., incorporated in Nevada, in November 1983, was then changed to "Dalfort Corporation" and a "new" Braniff airline subsidiary, named Braniff, Inc., was formed. Hyatt Corporation owned 80 percent of the newly formed Dalfort Corporation, and Braniff, Inc., was created as a wholly owned subsidiary of Dalfort. Ron Ridgeway was named president.

In June 1982, a trust was created to protect the interests of Braniff Airways and Braniff International Corporation senior creditors. James W. Toren of the Wilmington Trust Company, were both assigned as trustees of the newly formed BRNF Liquidating Trust. The BRNF Trust took control of certain Airways aircraft that had been used as collateral against Airways' and Corporation's debt. BRNF Trust leased 30 Boeing 727-200 series trijet aircraft to the new Braniff, Inc., in December 1983. These aircraft were used to launch the new Braniff on March 31, 1984.

=== New Braniff prepares for launch ===
On Thursday, March 1, 1984, Braniff, the successor to Braniff International Airways, and Braniff International Corporation, inaugurated service from its Dallas/Ft. Worth Airport hub to eighteen major US cities. It was the largest single-day successful airline startup in US history.

Braniff International Chairman Howard Putnam had demonstrated his sentiment towards the Braniff brand in June 1982 when he declared "Braniff will not fly again. Go find another job!"

The Braniff Family took Mr. Putnam's advice and embarked on a plan to create a new Braniff. They started their own airline literally from the ground up. Braniff International Airways ceased air carrier operations on May 12–13, 1982, and 22 months later a new reborn Braniff, Inc., was launched.

It was a long and hard-fought battle to put Braniff back into the air. The management at Braniff Airways was not interested in launching a new Braniff but preferred to retire the Braniff name and find a merger partner or a buyer for Airways' assets. Initially, in October 1982, a planned merger between Airways and Pacific Southwest Airlines (PSA) was proposed. PSA wanted to begin a low-cost, no-frills carrier in Texas with DFW as its base, and the assets of Airways looked to be a promising way to achieve this goal.

The new PSA Braniff would be operated as a separate entity and would become known as Pacific Southwest Airlines (PSA). The new entity would use some former Braniff employees and operate a select number of Airways' Boeing 727-200 jetliners. The plan met with resistance from Airways' labor groups but most importantly from the Federal Aviation Administration which was not pleased with the acquisition of Braniff Airways' landing slots at various proposed airports of service. The deal quickly fell through and Airways' began searching for another merger partner.

However, retired Braniff Airways pilots Captain Jack Morton and Captain Glenn Shoop proposed launching a new Braniff that would operate on its own under the famed and well-known Braniff moniker. The two pilots created a business plan that said the new carrier could operate Boeing 727-200s at 5 cents per available seat mile. Initial offering of the prospectus drew little interest, but Captain Shoop contacted Dallas businessman Bruce Leadbetter, who contacted Hyatt Hotels Chairman Jay Pritzker. Mr. Pritzker was interested in the Morton/Shoop Braniff proposal and agreed to discuss a possible deal.

Once convinced, Pritzker submitted a letter of intent, in April 1983, to Judge John Flower's bankruptcy court in Ft Worth, Texas, that was administering the Airways' and Braniff International Corporation's proceedings. Airways' management was not interested in the plan but was eventually cajoled into agreeing that it was the best course of action for Airways' employees, and creditors. Airways' board of directors approved the Hyatt plan on May 12, 1983, exactly one year after the cessation of operations of Airways. Creditors and labor groups accepted and approved the new plan by September 1983.

=== Braniff, Inc. aircraft color schemes ===
In October 1983, once the Hyatt Corporation plan to resurrect Braniff had been approved by Judge Flower's court and Braniff's labor groups and creditors, it was decided that a new look would be created for the exterior of Braniff's 30 leased Boeing 727-200s. Bob Perlman, Boeing Corporation's director of communications and designer, was tasked with creating a new look for the March 1, 1984, relaunch of the venerable Texas-based carrier.

A modernized version of the 1959 red,-white-and-blue El Dorado scheme was decided upon that included a white upper fuselage, dark-blue lower fuselage and a platinum pewter silver cheat line to separate the two main colors. Large, bold, stylized Braniff lettering in red was used on the forward fuselage but below the window line on the white painted fuselage area. The same lettering was uniquely angled up the vertical tail surfaces that followed the pewter and blue up the rear portion of the rudder surface.

The color scheme was a dramatic departure from the previous airline's solid colors of Alexander Girard and Harper and George. Braniff would retain the new scheme until the late 1980s, when a variety of modifications would be seen, including the placement of the Perlman design on a bare fuselage. A majority of the hybrid Perlamn schemes were the result of the leased aircraft types arriving in the fleet.

A red and light blue with a white dual check scheme was temporarily applied to some aircraft but was quickly decided against. In 1988, the company decided to reintroduce the Harper and George/Cars and Concepts/Halston Ultra Color scheme. A slightly modified Alexander Girard Sky Font was used in place of the Cars and Concepts Braniff Script. For Braniff's new Airbus A320-231 aircraft a unique Braniff Billboard scheme was applied that featured a white upper fuselage, light-blue lower fuselage, and massive red, purple, or gray Braniff lettering down the entire length of the aircraft body. The lettering was a modified Girard Sky Font.

=== Inauguration of service on March 1, 1984 ===
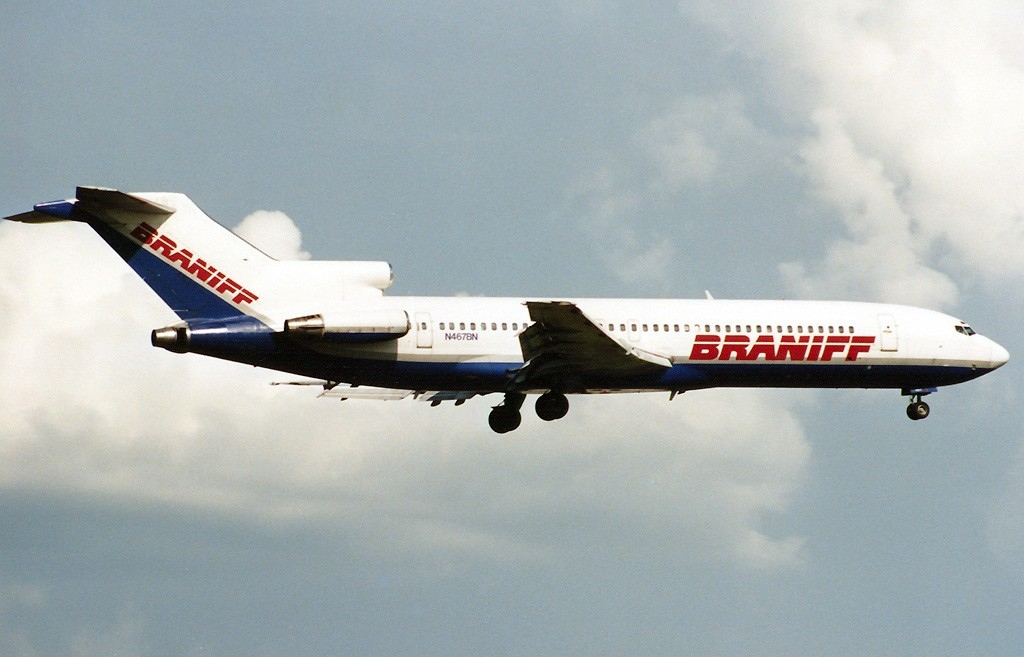
A Boeing 727-200 operated by the airline, approaching Orlando International Airport in 1989

After a special ribbon-cutting ceremony at The Braniff Terminal 2W Gate 13A at DFW, the first flight of the new Braniff, Inc., Flight 200 departed for New Orleans, Louisiana, at 6:50 am using a Boeing 727-200 (registered as N446BN). The next departure was Flight 131 with a Boeing 727-200 (N409BN) heading to San Antonio International Airport. Flight 720 was next out for Newark using Boeing 727-200 (N459BN) and finally Flight 151 departed for Houston with a Boeing 727-200 (N453BN).

The successor to Braniff Airways, Inc., and Braniff International Corporation inaugurated services on March 1, 1984, from its Dallas/Ft Worth Airport hub to eighteen major US cities. Oklahoma City, Braniff's former headquarters and first city that a Braniff scheduled flight departed from in 1928, held a special ceremony to celebrate the launching of the new Braniff.

At DFW on the morning of March 1, 1984, Braniff Flight 200 departed from The Braniff Terminal 2W Gate 13A, on time at 650AM, for New Orleans, Louisiana, officially marking the beginning of service for the new Braniff. The first flight included breakfast for everyone on board the flight. Invited guests for the inaugural ceremonies included Braniff executives, retired and former Airways' employees, civic leaders and members of the press who gathered at the former Hawaii Green Surfer Room and later Concorde International Room adjacent to Gate 13 to take part in the inaugural ceremonies.

A ribbon-cutting ceremony was held at the entrance to Gate 13A with Braniff and Hyatt Chair Jay A. Prizker and Braniff President William D. Slattery jointly cutting the ceremonial ribbon. The Braniff Crew on the first flight featured Captain Jack Murdock as Pilot In Command. Captain Murdock along with Captain Shoop and Captain Morton were highly instrumental in making the first flight of Braniff, Inc. possible. John Beckman served as Co-Pilot, Richard Rudman Flight Engineer rounded out the rest of the experienced cockpit crew with Mary Morris, Jean Kouns, Cynthia Zell, and Mary Furlich efficiently tending to the main cabin.

==== Inaugural celebration at Oklahoma City ====
Descendants of the original founding Braniff family members were on hand at a special celebration in Oklahoma City, home of Braniff's first flight in June 1928. The Braniff descendants at Braniff Gate 22 at Will Rogers World Airport were Braniff co-founder Paul Revere Braniff's son John Paul Braniff, Sr., and John Paul's son Michael S. Braniff. The two Braniff's were the guests of honor aboard the inaugural flight of Braniff, out of Oklahoma City heading to DFW Airport.

Flight 103 was one of 72 new Braniff flights that were launched on March 1, making the launch of the new Braniff the single largest scheduled airline startup in aviation history. Flight 102 from Dallas/Ft Worth to Oklahoma City had arrived earlier in the morning in order to be in position for the OKC to DFW inaugural flight.

Braniff Captain T. E. Watkins commanded the Boeing 727-200s from OKC to DFW. Upon arrival at DFW Airport the Braniff's were greeted by Braniff, Inc.'s, new President William D. Slattery.

Mr. Braniff, Sr., gave several speeches to Braniff employees during his tour of the new Braniff DFW facilities in Terminal 2W. He noted that, "this is a very touching scene, a very touching time." Mr. Braniff's son Michael, Spartan School of Aeronautics Aircraft Maintenance Technician Program graduate 1982, Tulsa and a student at University of Central Oklahoma, said that he would definitely get an A in history this semester. Braniff, Sr., was highly impressed with the special Braniff Champagne bottles, specially made for the inaugural day celebration, that bore his surname.

=== Destinations served effective on March 1, 1984 ===
The Braniff timetable dated March 1, 1984 listed the following 20 destinations served by the newly relaunched airline with the following message accompanying the route map: "THE NEW BRANIFF – We're building the new Braniff around you."

- Austin, TX (AUS)
- Chicago (ORD)
- Dallas/Fort Worth, Texas (DFW) – Hub
- Denver (DEN)
- Detroit (DTW)
- Houston (IAH)
- Kansas City, Missouri (MCI) (formerly KCI)
- Las Vegas (LAS)
- Los Angeles (LAX)
- Miami (MIA)
- Newark, New Jersey – Newark Airport (EWR)
- New Orleans (MSY)
- New York City – LaGuardia Airport (LGA)
- Oklahoma City, Oklahoma (OKC)
- Philadelphia (PHL)
- San Antonio, Texas (SAT)
- San Francisco (SFO)
- St. Louis (STL)
- Tulsa, Oklahoma (TUL)
- Washington, D.C. – Dulles Airport (IAD)
- Washington, D.C. – National Airport (DCA, now Reagan Airport)

All flights were being operated with Boeing 727-200 jetliners at this time.

=== Braniff Business Cabin ===
In a move to cater specifically to the business traveler, Braniff created the Braniff Business Cabin concept that called for a movable partition to be installed in the aircraft to divide up the two sections that would be installed on its aircraft. Business Cabin was placed in the front portion of the aircraft where all full Coach paying passenger will be seated. Braniff noted that it was not uncommon for a full Coach fare passenger to be seated next to a leisure passenger who might have paid 50 percent less or more for his fare. The leisure traveler was able to take advantage of 7 day advance fares or stay over a Saturday night which lowered their fare considerably. Braniff's Business Cabin eliminated this disenfranchisement of the full Coach fare paying passenger. Business Cabin service reflected the higher Coach fare that was paid by business travelers. With the movable partition, which was the first use of a movable bulkhead in the airline industry, allowed Braniff to adjust the sections of the aircraft to passenger loads and fare types.

Braniff Business Cabin service was in the manner of First Class and offered improved service levels in all customer service areas including improved inflight meal service. The business traveler became the focus of Braniff not only during flight but also at the airport. Braniff provided quick and efficient check in and strove for on time departures. New large and roomy overhead luggage storage was installed on all Braniff aircraft. The new compartments were large enough to lay hanging bags completely flat. Other Braniff Business Cabin inflight amenities included a choice of meal entrees and a complimentary newspaper.

=== Frequent flyer program ===
During the first year of operation Braniff's frequent flyer program was called Metroplex Club along with a frequent flyer incentive program called Mileage Plus in conjunction with United Airlines. Travelers could earn points for travel on Braniff that could be used for free travel at a future time. Braniff joined with United Airlines so that Braniff passengers flying on United could also earn frequent flyer miles.

Mileage Plus also gave passengers access to Lufthansa, Scandinavian Airlines, and Air New Zealand and the wealth of international destinations that these carriers served such as Hawaii, London, Tokyo, and Hong Kong. Braniff travelers could also access cruise travel on Royal Viking to the Caribbean.

In January 1988, Braniff changed the name of its frequent flyer program to Get It All. The new program was aimed at the higher yield business travel market and featured an 18-month rolling award program. Travelers could only use their awards within 18 months of it being earned. A sizable increase in available awards along with free travel and vacation packages were key features of the enhanced Braniff Get It All frequent flyer program.

=== Administrative offices at Love Field ===
Braniff Inc. moved its administrative offices into the former Dallas Love Field headquarters of Braniff International Airways located at 7701 Lemmon Avenue in the city of Dallas although the airline actually served the area via the Dallas/Fort Worth International Airport (DFW).

=== Low fares and single-class service ===
Braniff's initial plan to emphasize top line service to business travelers was not successful as it lost a large amount of money during its first six months of operation. In September 1984, a strategic change was made to Braniff's business model that included a single class of service and low fares. Braniff's slogan "Best Low Fare in the Air" reflected its vision of offering low-cost, unrestricted fares on every flight, every day. All seats on the planes were leather and only one class of service was offered: there was no business or first class section. By 1988, Braniff had chosen Kansas City International Airport as its main hub and was operating over 70 flights per day out of Kansas City.

Actor Wilford Brimley became something of a spokesperson for the airline with his "Dance With the One that Brung Ya" commercials. According to the airline's September 1, 1989 system timetable, Braniff was serving 40 airports in the U.S. and the Bahamas with mainline jet service. Nassau was the airline's only international destination at this time. Additional destinations were served from Kansas City by regional air carriers Air Midwest and Midcontinent Airlines which utilized turboprop and prop aircraft to provide connecting feeder service via respective code sharing agreements. These carriers operated as Braniff Express and their aircraft were painted in a special color scheme.

=== Acquisition campaign ===
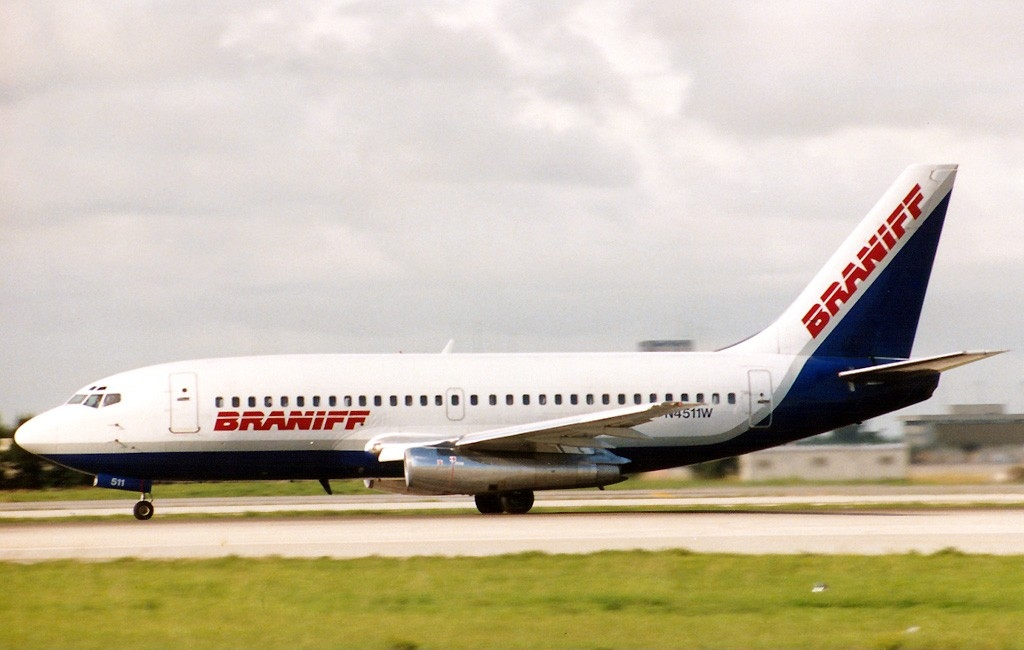
A Braniff Boeing 737-200 at Miami International Airport in 1989

In October 1987, Braniff leased ten Boeing 737-200s from Polaris Aircraft Leasing to supplement its Boeing 727s and indicated it was interested in the struggling Orlando-based airline Florida Express. Braniff soon announced that it was making an offer to acquire Florida Express outright. On April 19, 1988, Florida Express became a wholly owned subsidiary of Braniff after the deal was approved by a majority of Florida Express stockholders. Braniff assumed operation of its routes and its British Aircraft Corporation BAC One-Eleven twinjet aircraft, some of which were the same aircraft that BIA—the first U.S. operator of the type—had disposed of in the 1960s. The former Florida Express hub at Orlando International Airport, with over 30 flights per day, became a secondary hub for Braniff with the BAC One-Eleven aircraft being operated as Braniff Express service.

In late 1987, Braniff attempted to acquire Pan Am, holding months of negotiations; however, Braniff failed to negotiate $200 million in labor concessions from Pan Am's principal unions, which had been demanded as a precondition by the Pan Am corporate board. The buyout offer was terminated in late December by mutual consent.

Braniff sustained a net loss of $12.2 million for fiscal year 1987 compared to a $9 million loss the previous year. CEO Patrick Foley attributed this to intense competition and to costs incurred from the aggressive expansion campaign.

=== Braniff ownership change ===
In June 1988, Braniff was purchased from Dalfort Corporation via a stock purchase agreement by BIA-COR Holdings, Inc., with Braniff becoming a subsidiary of BIA-COR Holdings, and BIA Acquisitions, Inc., a wholly owned subsidiary of BIA-COR. BIA-COR purchased a sufficient amount of Braniff stock to gain voting control over the airline and a merger agreement was executed. The merger of BIA Acquisitions and Braniff was completed on October 24, 1988, with all assets of BIA being transferred to Braniff. BIA-COR Holdings, formed by the Paine Webber which provided a bridge loan for the Braniff acquisition, was headed by financier Jeffrey Chodorow, chairman and chief executive officer of Coregroup, a Philadelphia investor company. New York City real estate developer Arthur G. Cohen was also a major principal of BIA-COR Holdings, Inc.

A new senior management team, from Piedmont Airlines, was installed that included William G. McGee as chairman, president, and chief executive officer, W. Howard MacKinnon, executive vice president and chief financial officer, and Richard L. James, executive vice president – planning. At the time of the BIA-COR acquisition of Braniff, it was the 13th largest airline in the United States in terms of revenue passenger miles flown system-wide. As of April 15, 1989, the carrier served 39 destinations in the United States as well as Nassau, Bahamas. Braniff operated 24 Boeing 727-200s, 15 Boeing 737-200s and 18 BAC One-Elevens. Twenty Boeing 727s were leased from the BRNF Liquidating Trust as a result of the original December 15, 1983, lease agreement and the remaining four were leased from outside lessors. Ten Boeing 737s were leased from Polaris and the remaining four were subleased from American Airlines via Core Holdings, a wholly owned subsidiary of BIA-COR Holdings. All eighteen BAC One-Eleven twinjets were leased from outside leasing entities.

=== New aircraft orders ===
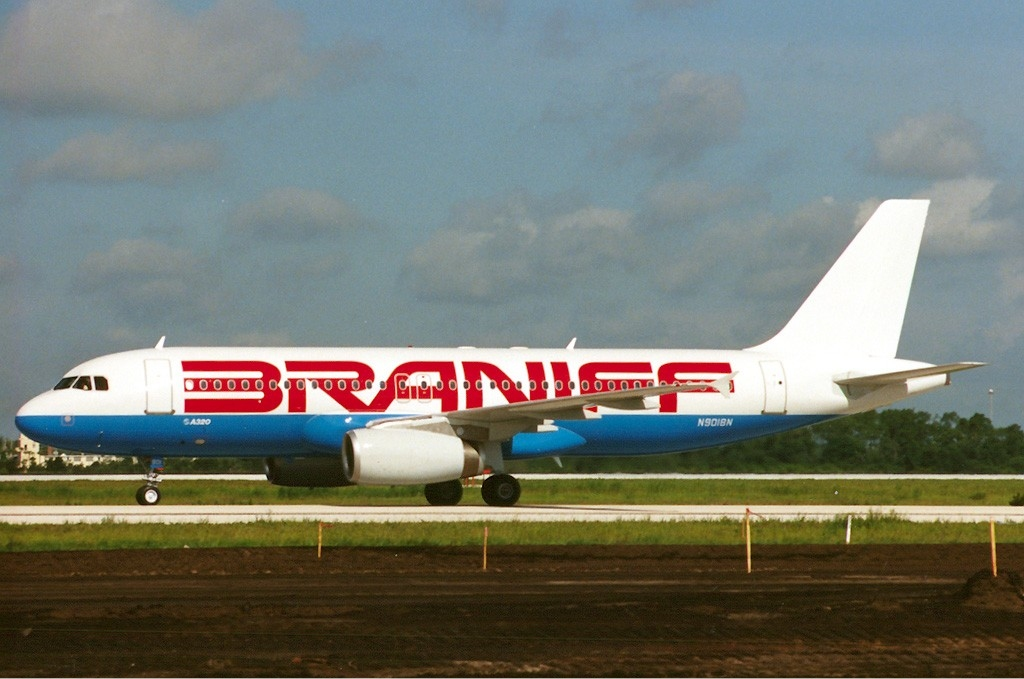
A Braniff Airbus A320-200 taxiing at Orlando International Airport in 1989

In 1988, the airline's debts were beginning to increase. Braniff ordered new Fokker 100s; however, these aircraft could not be delivered in a timely fashion due to an order backlog from fellow U.S. carriers and 100 operators American Airlines and US Airways. Then, 50 Airbus A320s orders were taken over from Pan Am. In 1989, the first two A320s were introduced in order to increase Braniff's presence in the Florida market. The new Airbus aircraft proved to be very expensive to operate. The second incarnation of Braniff also operated Boeing 727-200s and Boeing 737-200s during its existence.

=== Braniff Express ===
Beginning in late 1986 Braniff began code-sharing relationships with several commuter airlines to help feed its hub cities at Dallas/Fort Worth and Kansas City, as well as at Phoenix. These carriers then began operating as Braniff Express. At DFW, agreements were made with Rio Airways and with Altus Airlines. At Phoenix an agreement was set up with Havasu Airlines to serve Bullhead City and Lake Havasu City, AZ. At Braniff's largest hub of Kansas City, three carriers were used for Braniff Express feeder operations; Air Midwest, Midcontinent Airlines, and Capitol Air Service. Service was provided to many cities throughout Kansas and the Midwestern United States. Air Midwest also had an extensive operation at Wichita operating as Braniff Express. All Braniff Express operations had ended by late 1989.

=== Headquarters moves to Orlando ===
In 1989, Braniff moved its headquarters from Dallas, Texas, to Orlando, Florida. This was only the third headquarters location since Braniff's original founding in 1928. The carrier was originally based in Oklahoma City and moved its headquarters to Dallas Love Field in 1942, and to DFW Airport, Texas, in 1978. Braniff moved its headquarters back to Dallas Love Field in December 1983, and remained there until the move to Orlando, Florida. The airline had begun moving its hub operation from DFW Airport to Kansas City and Orlando as a result of the merger with Florida Express. Eastern Airlines had abandoned its large hub at Kansas City International Airport and Braniff was positioned to step in and take over two of the three circular terminals at the midwest airport.

=== Bankruptcy and cessation of operations ===
In September 1989, the airline filed for Chapter 11 bankruptcy protection, immediately laid off 2,700 of its 4,700 employees, and slashed its flight schedule from 256 flights to 40 destinations to 46 flights to 11 destinations. On 6 November 1989 the airline suspended all scheduled flights, announcing that it was out of cash, most remaining employees would soon be laid off, and it would operate only air charters. The airline had cut fares to attract travelers after slashing its flight schedule in September, and industry observers speculated that this move had not restored profits. Braniff continued operating a limited Boeing 727 charter operation but finally ceased operations at the end of December 1989. A buyer was sought, but never found, and the company agreed to liquidate all assets in three separate auctions.

Braniff, Inc's., parent company BIA-Cor Holdings purchased the assets of the carrier for pennies on the dollar. These assets were used to start the third reincarnation of Braniff in 1991, called Braniff International Airlines. America West Airlines subsequently acquired the Airbus A320-200s that were originally delivered to Braniff. Braniff, Inc. existed until 1998, when Joe Mitchell, Keith Rosenberg, and four other employees closed the airline's files.

=== Destinations in 1989 ===
The following destination information is taken from the Braniff September 1, 1989 system timetable shortly before the airline ceased all operations:

- Albuquerque, New Mexico (ABQ)
- Atlanta (ATL)
- Boston (BOS)
- Chicago (ORD)
- Cleveland (CLE)
- Columbus, Ohio (CMH)
- Dallas/Ft. Worth, Texas (DFW)
- Denver (DEN)
- Detroit (DTW)
- Ft. Lauderdale, Florida (FLL)
- Ft. Myers, Florida (RSW)
- Houston (IAH)
- Indianapolis (IND)
- Kansas City, Missouri (MCI) – Primary Hub
- Las Vegas (LAS)
- Los Angeles (LAX)
- Miami (MIA)
- Milwaukee (MKE)
- Minneapolis/St. Paul, Minnesota (MSP)
- Nassau, Bahamas (NAS) – only international destination.
- Newark, New Jersey (EWR)
- New York City – LaGuardia Airport (LGA)
- Oklahoma City, Oklahoma (OKC)
- Omaha, Nebraska (OMA)
- Ontario, California (ONT)
- Orlando, Florida (MCO) – Secondary Hub
- Philadelphia (PHL)
- Phoenix (PHX)
- St. Louis (STL)
- San Antonio, TX (SAT)
- San Diego (SAN)
- San Francisco (SFO)
- Seattle (SEA)
- Tampa, Florida/St. Petersburg, Florida (TPA)
- Tucson, Arizona (TUS)
- Tulsa, Oklahoma (TUL)
- Washington, D.C. – Reagan Airport (DCA)
- Washington, D.C. – Dulles International Airport (IAD)
- West Palm Beach, Florida (PBI)
- Wichita, KS (ICT)

== Fleet ==
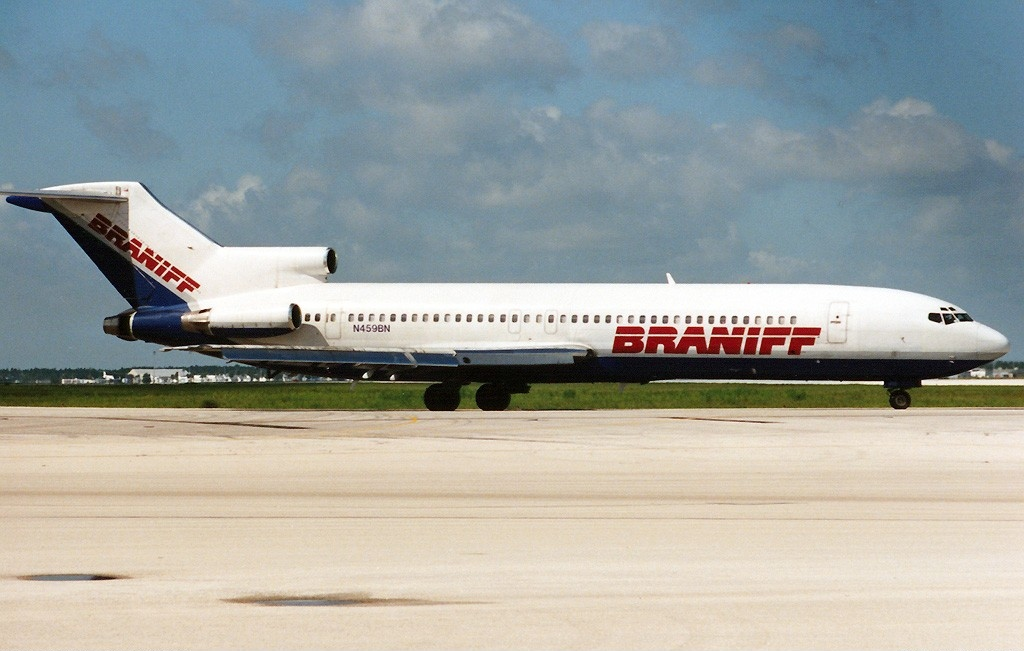
A Braniff Boeing 727-200 at Orlando International Airport in 1989

The Braniff Inc. fleet consisted of the following aircraft:

Braniff Inc. fleet
Aircraft	Total	Introduced	Retired	Notes
Airbus A320-200	6	1989	1989	Transferred to America West Airlines
Boeing 727-200	34	1984	1990	
BAC One-Eleven Series 200	15	1988	1989	Several of these aircraft were previously operated by the original Braniff International Airways
BAC One-Eleven Series 400	3	1988	1989	
Boeing 737-200	23	1987	1990	

== In popular culture ==
- Braniff Productions, Trey Parker and Matt Stone's production company that produced South Park, was named after this particular airline. The company used a five-second segment from a mid-1980s commercial as their production logo at the end of each episode from 1997 to 2006. The final episode that used the logo was the Season Ten episode "Smug Alert!". The company was renamed to Parker-Stone Productions (later South Park Studios) in 2007.

== See also ==
- List of defunct airlines of the United States
- Braniff International Airways
- Braniff (1991–1992)
- Pritzker family
