= Florida Express =

Florida low-cost carrier (1984-1988)

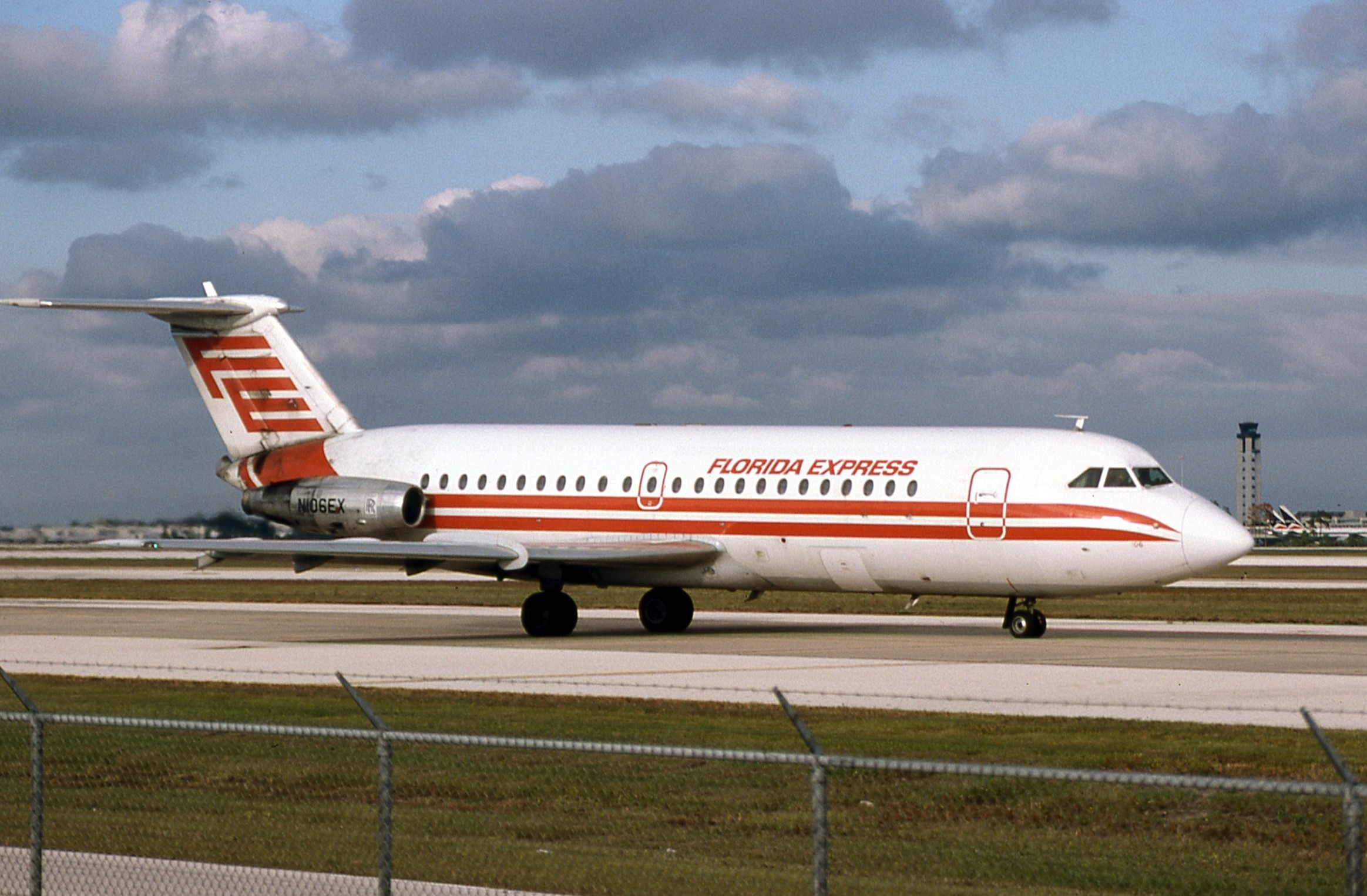
- Florida Express BAC 1-11
IATA	ICAO	Call sign
ZO	FLX	FLEXAIR
- Founded: 24 January 1983
- Commenced operations: 26 January 1984
- Ceased operations: 1988
- Operating bases: Orlando, Florida
- Fleet size: 19
- Destinations: 14
- Headquarters: Orlando, Florida; United States
- Founder: Gordon Linkon (CEO)
- Employees: 385 (1985)

Florida Express was an airline headquartered in Orlando, Florida, United States. Orlando International Airport (MCO) served as the airline's hub with a point-to-point linear route system in the eastern U.S. and Florida. Established in 1984, the air carrier operated a small fleet consisting exclusively of British Aircraft Corporation BAC One-Eleven twin jet aircraft and employed approximately 385 employees in 1985. It was incorporated in Delaware on January 24, 1983 and received its economic certificate from the Civil Aeronautics Board exactly a year later on January 24, 1984. First flight was January 26, 1984 and it was co-founded and led by Gordon Linkon, a former Midway Airlines president and Frontier Airlines executive. The airline completed an initial public offering on October 16, 1985, raising $13mm. The airline's toll-free phone number was 1-800-FAST-JET.

On October 28, 1987, the second incarnation of Braniff announced its acquisition of Florida Express in a deal worth $20mm (over $50mm in 2024 dollars). After government approvals, the deal closed on April 19, 1988. However, before the deal closed, from January 15, 1988 onward, Florida Express flew for Braniff under the name Braniff Express.

== Fleet ==
1987-88 World Airline Fleets (copyright 1987) lists the Florida Express fleet as follows:

- 6 BAC 1-11-201AC
- 9 BAC 1-11-203AE
- 3 BAC 1-11-401AK
- 1 BAC 1-11-414AE

The 203AE series aircraft were originally delivered to Braniff International Airways, the US trunk carrier that ceased operation in 1982, a separate but related carrier from the Braniff that bought Florida Express.

== Destinations ==
As of January 1984:

- Florida
  - Fort Lauderdale (FLL)
  - Miami (MIA)
  - Orlando (MCO - Hub)
  - Tampa (TPA)
- Indiana
  - Indianapolis (IND)
- Kentucky
  - Louisville (SDF)
- Tennessee
  - Nashville (BNA)
- Virginia
  - Norfolk (ORF)
  - Richmond (RIC)

As of April 1986:

- Alabama
  - Birmingham (BHM)
- Florida
  - Fort Lauderdale (FLL)
  - Miami (MIA)
  - Orlando (MCO - Hub)
  - St. Petersburg/Clearwater/Tampa (PIE)
  - West Palm Beach (PBI)
- Indiana
  - Indianapolis (IND)
- Kentucky
  - Cincinnati, Ohio (CVG)
  - Louisville (SDF)
- Louisiana
  - New Orleans (MSY)
- Ohio (for Cincinnati, see Kentucky)
  - Columbus (CMH)
- Pennsylvania
  - Harrisburg (MDT)
- Tennessee
  - Knoxville (TYS)
  - Nashville (BNA)

== See also ==
- List of defunct airlines of the United States
