= SunCoast Airlines =

IATA	ICAO	Call sign
—	SNT	SUNCOAST
- Commenced operations: January 17, 1986; 39 years ago
- Ceased operations: January 5, 1988; 37 years ago
- Operating bases: Fort Lauderdale-Hollywood Airport
- Fleet size: 3 Boeing 727

SunCoast Airlines was a United States charter airline based in Fort Lauderdale-Hollywood Airport, Florida. It flew a fleet of Boeing 727-100s. The airline filed for bankruptcy on January 5, 1988. In January 1988, SunCoast filed for Chapter 11 bankruptcy.
