= Delta Air =

Delta Air may refer to:

- Delta Air (Germany), German regional airline (1977–1992)
- Delta Air Lines, a major American airline
