= Thomas Winkelmann =

German aviation executive (born 1959)

Thomas Winkelmann (born 20 December 1959) is a German businessman and was the Chief Executive Officer (CEO) of the former German airline Air Berlin until it ceased operations in October 2017.

== Early life ==
He was born in Hagen in North Rhine-Westphalia (Nordrhein-Westfalen). He studied Linguistics and Classics at the Free University of Berlin (Freie Universität Berlin) and the University of Münster (Westfälische Wilhelms-Universität). In 2004 he completed the AMP at Harvard Business School.

== Career ==
He joined Lufthansa in 1998. He was the head of the company for Latin America and the Caribbean, based in Miami. He became Vice-President of Lufthansa for North and South America, based in New York in September 2000.

=== Germanwings ===
He became Chief Executive (Geschäftsführer) of Germanwings in September 2006, when it was owned by Eurowings, which was then headquartered in Dortmund. Germanwings was effectively bought by Lufthansa at the end of 2009.

He is also on the Board of Directors of JetBlue, an American low-cost airline.

=== Air Berlin ===
On 18 December 2016, it was announced that Winkelmann succeeded Stefan Pichler as CEO of Air Berlin in February 2017.

In October 2017, Air Berlin confirms that it will cease all of its own operations by 27 October 2017. The last flight of Air Berlin was operated by Airbus A320 D-ABNW in the same day. It departed from Munich at 21:36 and landed at Berlin Tegel at 22:45 at night.

== Personal life ==
He lives in Berlin, with his wife and children. He watches Borussia Dortmund.

Business positions
Preceded by Stefan Pichler	Chief executive officer of Air Berlin; February 2017 – October 2017	Succeeded by Office abolished
