= Air Berlin =

Airline of Germany (1978–2017)

Air Berlin Incorporated Air Berlin PLC & Co. Luftverkehrs KG

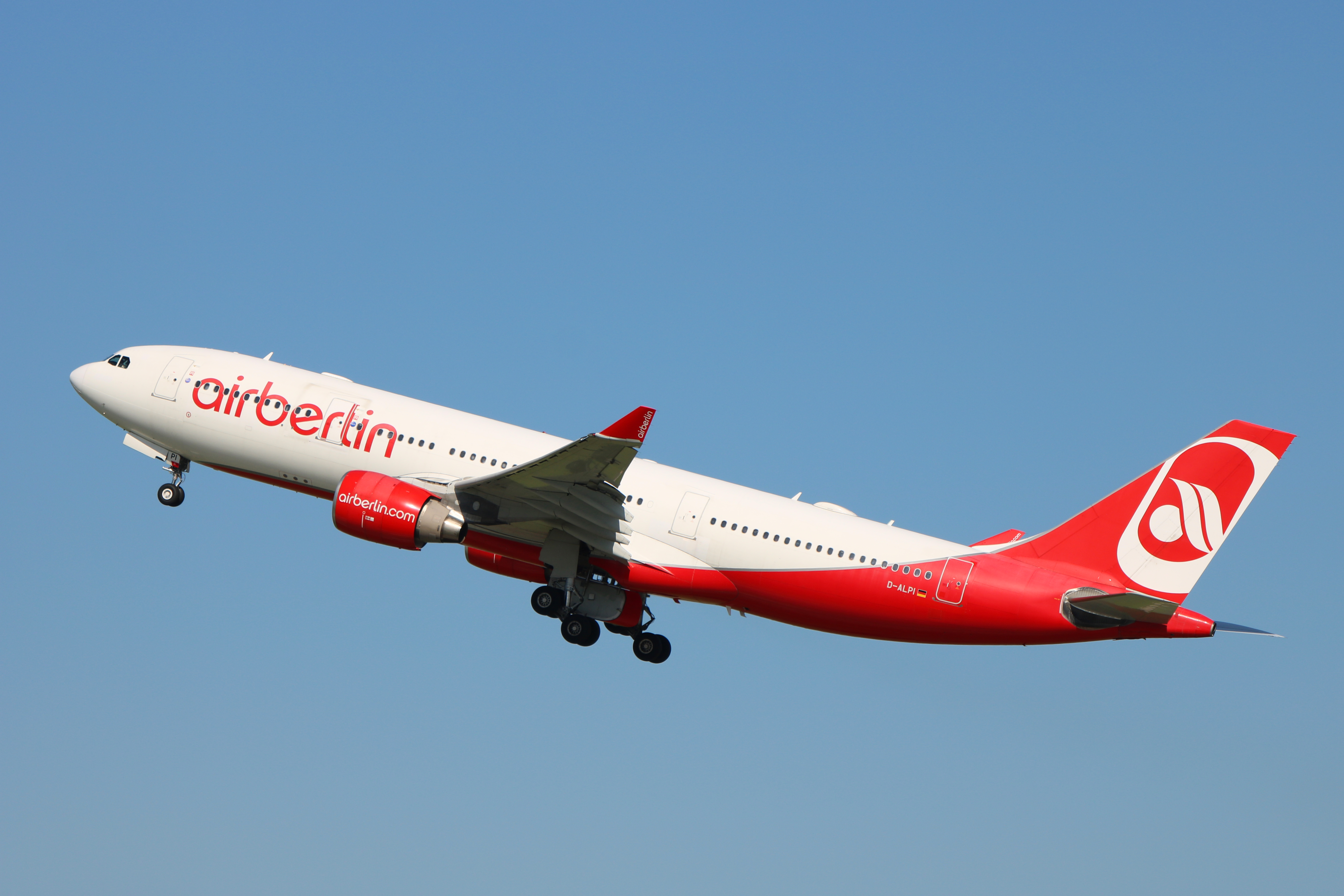
- Airbus A330-200
IATA	ICAO	Call sign
AB	BER	AIR BERLIN
- Founded: 11 July 1978 (as Air Berlin USA)
- Commenced operations: 28 April 1979
- Ceased operations: 27 October 2017
- Hubs: Berlin–Tegel
- Secondary hubs: Düsseldorf; Munich; Nuremberg
- Focus cities: Palma de Mallorca
- Frequent-flyer program: topbonus
- Alliance: Oneworld (2012–2017)
- Subsidiaries: Air Berlin Aviation; Air Berlin Turkey (2011–2013); Belair (2001–2017); DBA (2006–2008); Niki (2003–2017)
- Parent company: Air Berlin plc & Co. Luftverkehrs KG
- Traded as: FWB: AB1
- Headquarters: Charlottenburg-Wilmersdorf, Berlin, Germany
- Key people: Thomas Winkelmann (CEO)

Air Berlin, branded as airberlin or airberlin.com was a major German airline. At its peak, it was Germany's second-largest airline, after Lufthansa, and Europe's tenth-largest airline in terms of passengers carried. It was headquartered in Berlin and had hubs at Berlin Tegel Airport and Düsseldorf Airport. At the time of its insolvency, it was a member of the Oneworld airline alliance, having joined in 2012.

The airline was originally founded by American interests in 1978 to provide airline service to West Berlin, a territory that could not legally be served by West German airlines such as Lufthansa due to political restrictions on East German airspace. In 1991, shortly after German reunification, Air Berlin became a German-owned company and shifted its core business to compete more directly with Lufthansa, eventually becoming one of Germany's biggest airlines. After years of losses, Air Berlin filed for insolvency in August 2017 and ceased operations two months later.

== History ==
=== 1978–1990: American charter airline in West Berlin ===
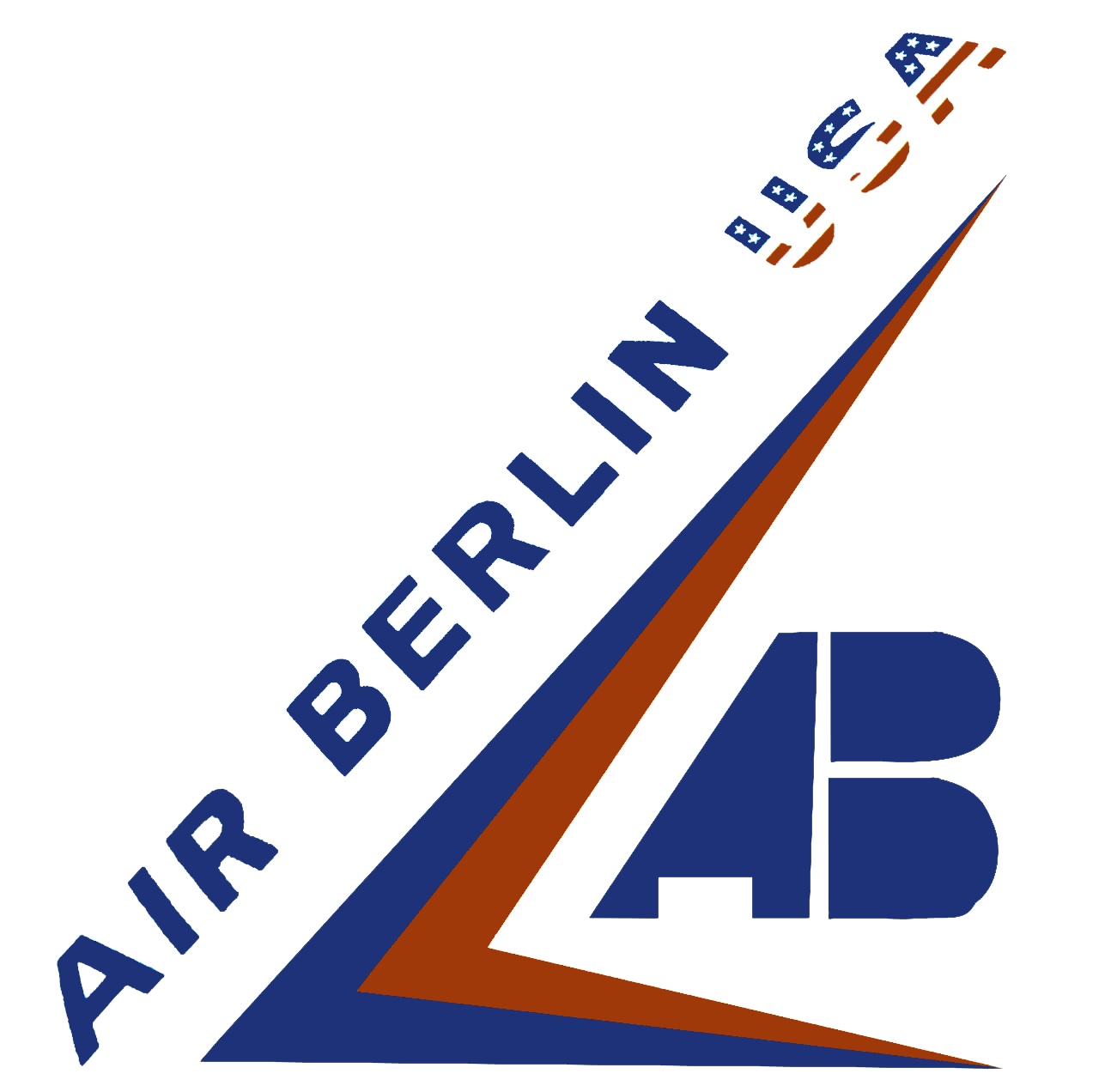
The original Air Berlin USA logo

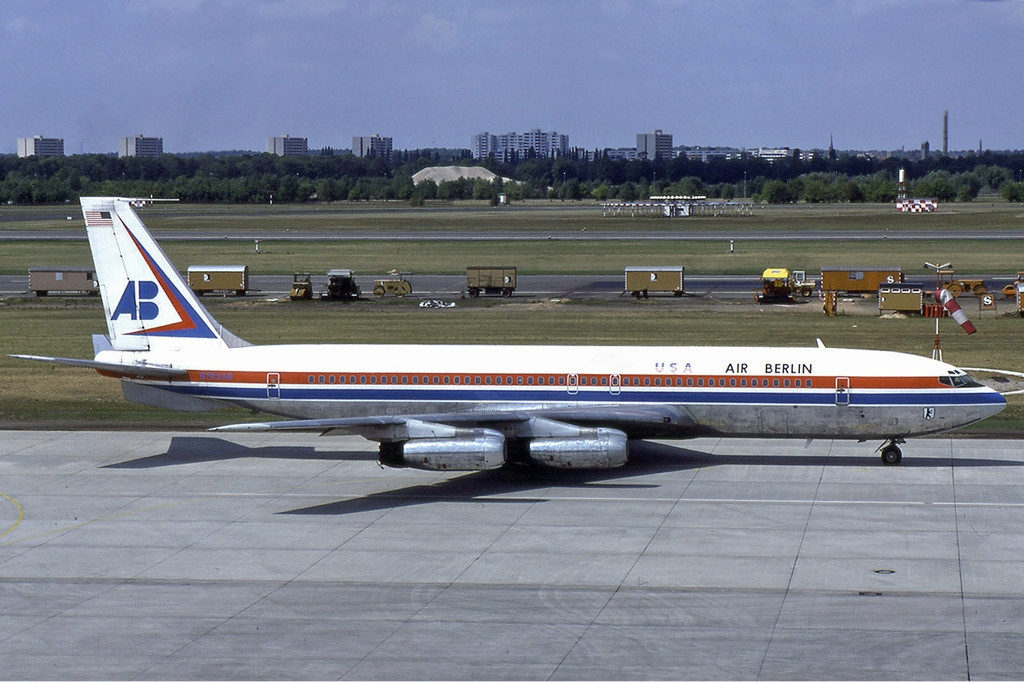
Air Berlin's aircraft livery has changed several times. The original Air Berlin USA livery (pictured) was used on the airline's Boeing 707s and Boeing 737-200s...

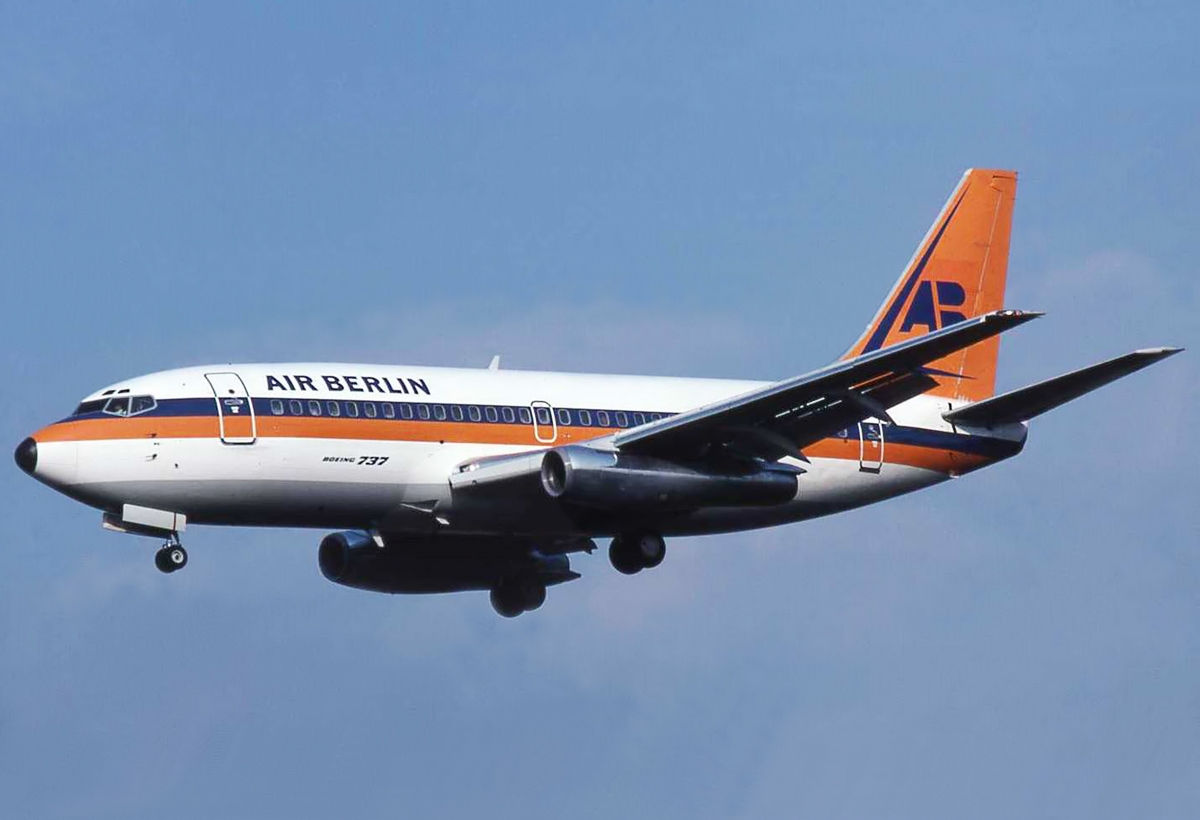
... which was replaced with this Hapag-Lloyd Flug-hybrid livery during the early 1980s, when Air Berlin operated a single Boeing 737-200.

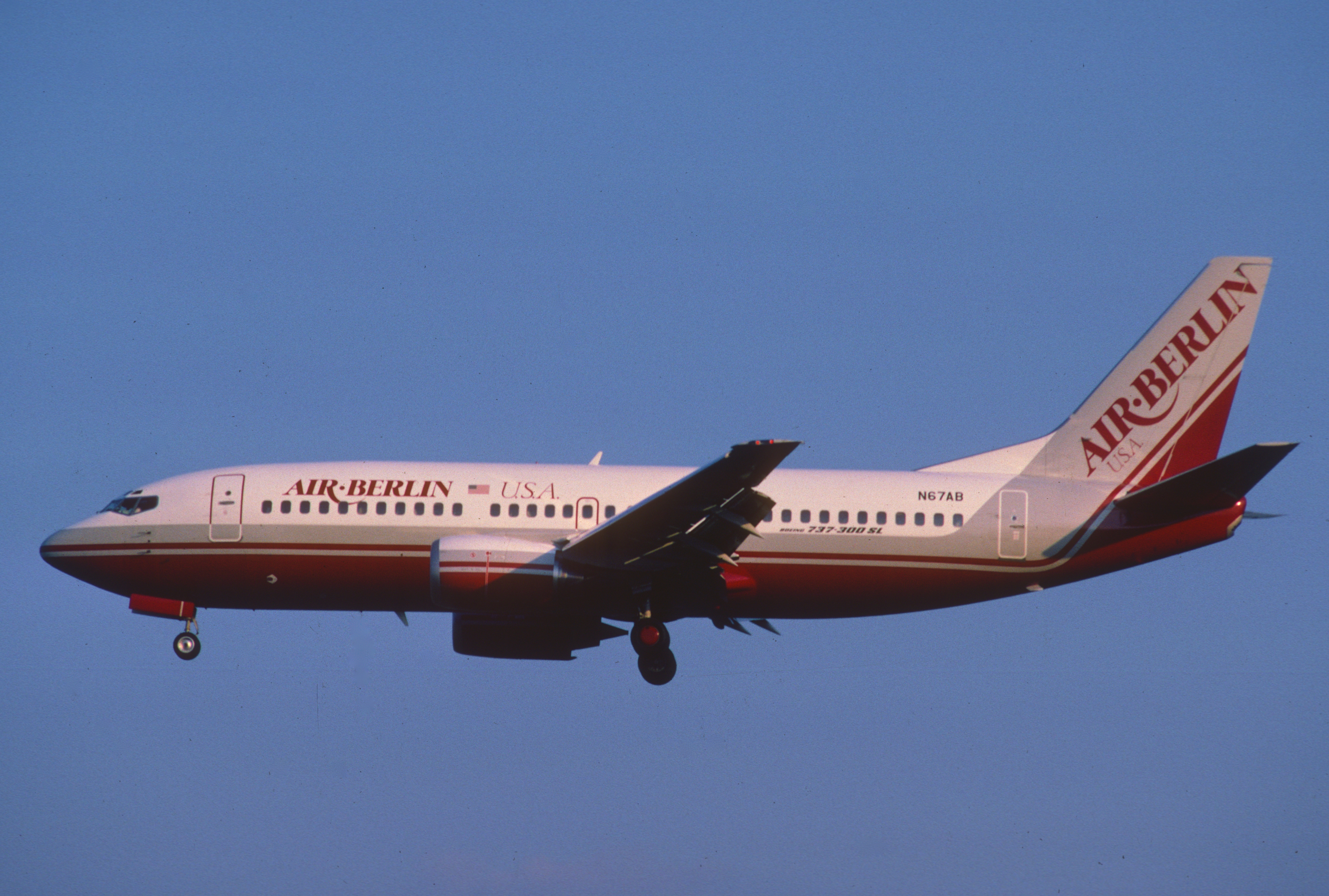
A ruby-colored livery was introduced when the Boeing 737-300 (pictured) was put in service in 1986,...

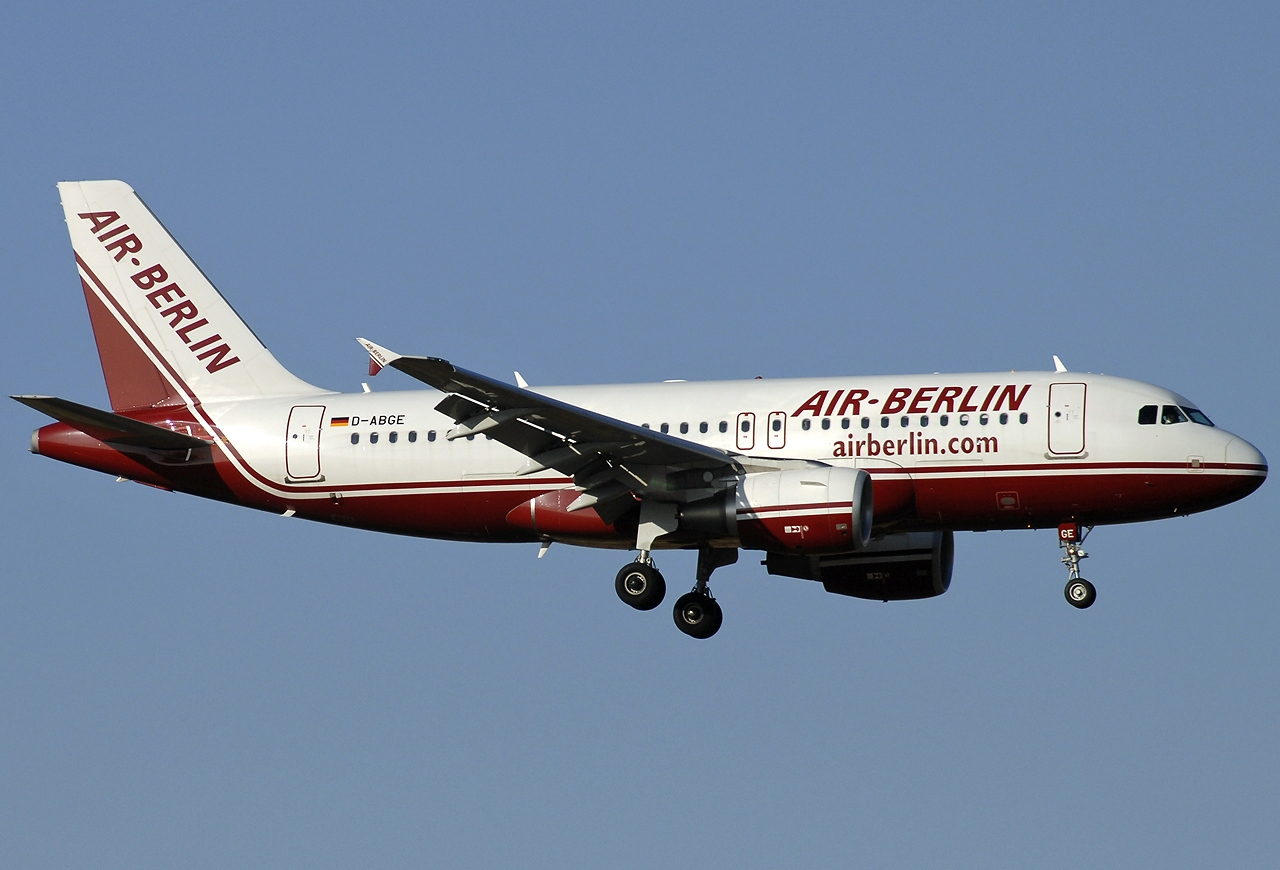
... and remained largely unchanged for more than two decades (the later version is shown here on an Airbus A319-100 in 2008).

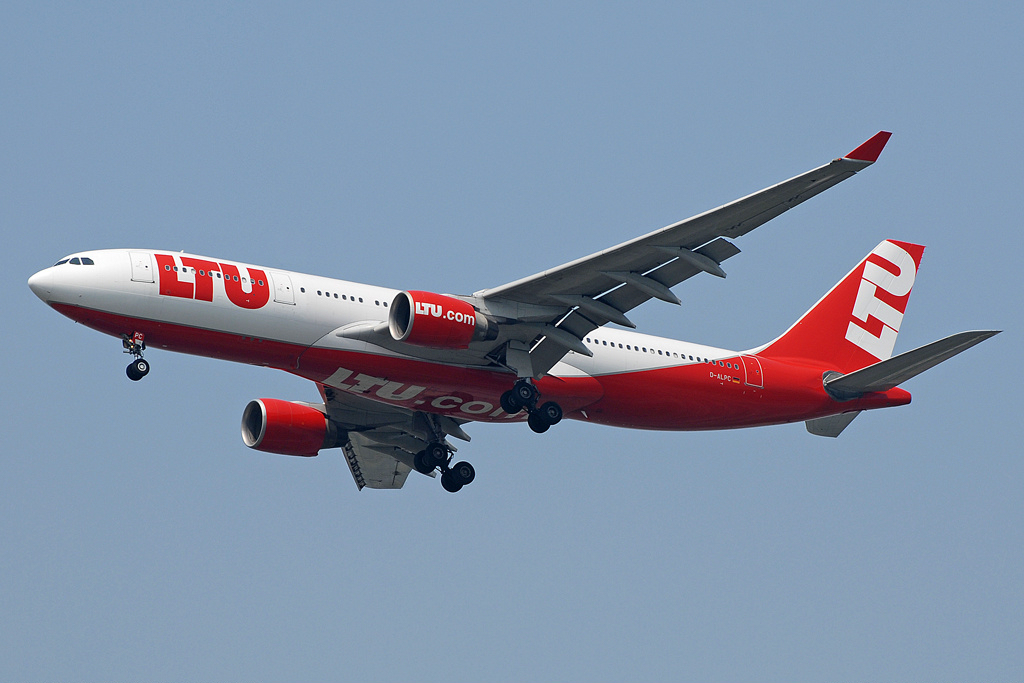
After the merger with LTU in 2007, the new basic LTU scheme was adopted,...

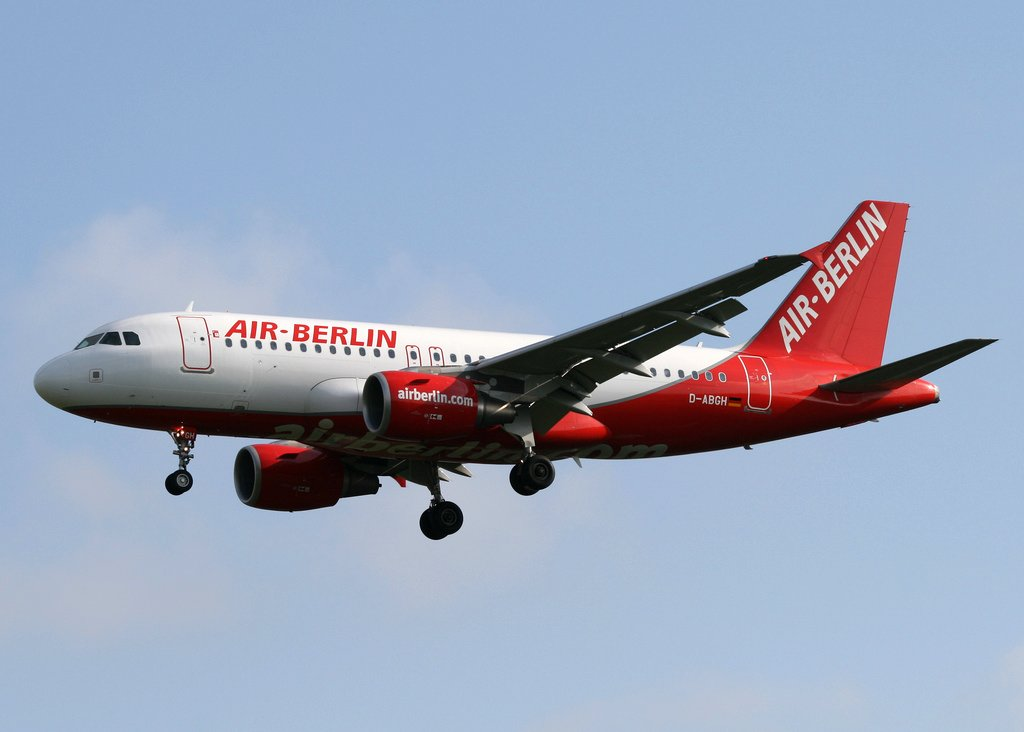
... and was used in an interim scheme until the introduction of the new logo,...

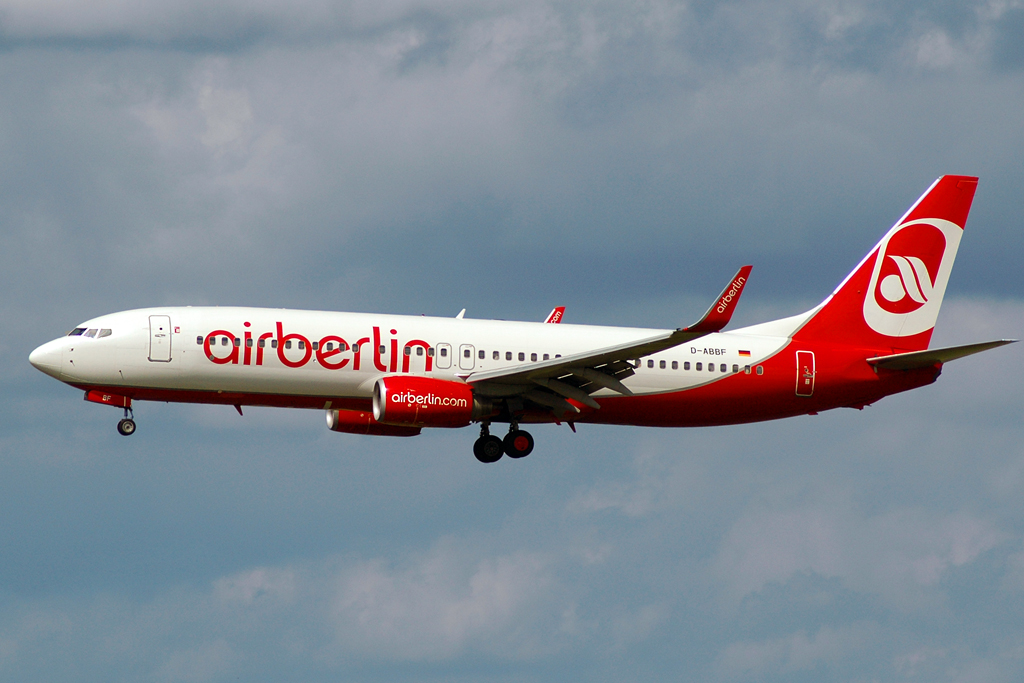
... to become this bright red color scheme as featured on this Boeing 737-800, which was the airline's last livery.

Originally registered as Air Berlin USA, the company was founded in 1978 as a wholly owned subsidiary of Lelco, an American agricultural enterprise headquartered in Oregon, to operate charter flights on behalf of German tour operators from Berlin Tegel Airport, mostly to Mediterranean holiday resorts.

The co-founders of Air Berlin USA were:

- Kim Lundgren, a former Berlin-based flight engineer of Pan American World Airways;
- John MacDonald, a former station manager of United States supplemental air carrier Saturn Airways at Berlin Tempelhof Airport in the 1960s and subsequent general manager Europe and vice president at the Berlin Tegel Airport base of the former United States supplemental carrier and charter airline Modern Air from 1968 until 1974;
- Mort Beyer, Modern Air's executive vice president from 1967 until 1971 as well as the airline's president and vice president of the National Air Carrier Association (Note: the United States supplemental carrier industry association) in 1971 and founder of United States aviation consultancy Avmark.

Lelco was the agriculture business of Kim Lundgren's family in the United States.

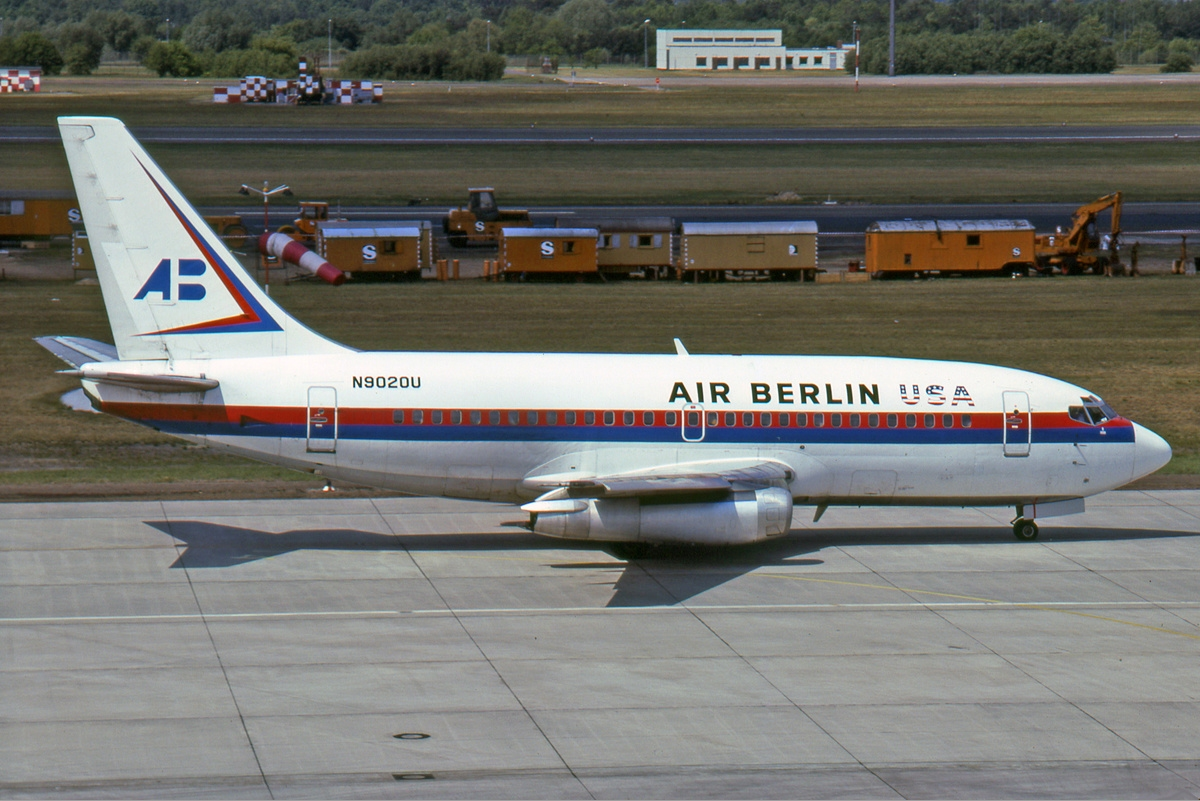
Boeing 737-200

As a United States airline, Air Berlin was able to access the West Berlin airline market. During the Cold War, Berlin's special political status meant that the air corridors into and out of Tegel Airport could only be used by airlines registered in France, the United Kingdom or the United States. The airline's headquarters were initially at Tegel Airport. Leonard Lundgren was the first chairman.

After the company was issued an airline licence and acquired two Boeing 707 jet airliners previously owned by Trans World Airlines, Air Berlin USA commenced revenue services on 28 April 1979 with a flight from Berlin-Tegel to Palma de Mallorca. Plans were made to start long-haul flights on West Berlin-Brussels-Florida routes, in cooperation with Air Florida (an agreement to that effect had been signed in February 1979).

In 1980, two Boeing 737-200s were leased from Air Florida. In 1981, Air Berlin USA continued its weekly scheduled Boeing 707 service on the Berlin Tegel Airport - Brussels - Orlando route; however, by 1982, the 707s had been phased out, and during most of the 1980s, Air Berlin USA operated only a single 737-200 or (from 1986) a 737-300. In 1990 and 1991, two Boeing 737-400s were also placed into service.

=== 1990–2000: New investors and expansion ===
German reunification led to significant changes to the European aviation market, and in particular in Berlin: German airlines now gained access to the city. In 1991, Air Berlin (which had 90 employees at the time) was restructured as Air Berlin GmbH & Co. Luftverkehrs KG, a German-registered company, with several German investors joining Kim Lundgren, the original founder, thereby bringing the ownership in line with German foreign-control requirements. Joachim Hunold (de), a former sales and marketing director with LTU International, now led the company.

Following an order for ten Boeing 737-800s, Air Berlin grew and by 1999, the fleet grew to twelve aircraft. In 2001, Air Berlin and Hapag-Lloyd Flug became the first airlines in the world to have their Boeing 737-800s fitted with blended winglets, wingtip devices that are intended to improve fuel efficiency.

Air Berlin introduced scheduled flights (which could be booked directly with the airline rather than via a tour operator) in 1997, initially linking a number of secondary German airports to Mallorca. By 2002, 35 percent of Air Berlin's tickets were sold directly. In the same year, the airline expanded beyond holiday destinations as low-fare flights marketed as "City Shuttle" to London, Barcelona, Milan and Vienna started. Besides Berlin-Tegel, these routes were opened at six German airports (Dortmund, Düsseldorf, Hamburg, Münster/Osnabrück, Nuremberg, and Paderborn/Lippstadt) that until then had not been served by one of the rising European low-cost carriers. In what later became a hallmark for Air Berlin as a "semi-low cost carrier", the airline offered complimentary meals and seat reservations, in contrast to its competitors Buzz, Hapag-Lloyd Express, Ryanair and Virgin Express.

=== 2000–2006: Becoming Germany's second-largest airline ===
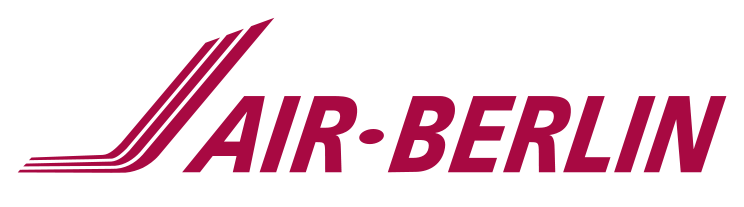
The Air Berlin logo used from 1986 until 2008.

In November 2001, the delivery flight of a Boeing 737-800 fitted with winglets set a record: the aircraft with the registration code D-ABBC flew 8,345 kilometres non-stop from Seattle (Boeing Field), USA to Berlin (TXL), Germany in 9 hours, 10 minutes.

In January 2004, Air Berlin announced it would cooperate with Niki, a Vienna-based airline. As part of the deal, Air Berlin took a 24% stake in Niki.

In 2005, the Group reorganised its corporate structure. It established Air Berlin plc (registered in England) into which it reversed Air Berlin GmbH & Co. Luftverkehrs KG and subsidiaries. It was suggested that the reason for the group to establish a UK-based PLC instead of a German-based AG was to avoid the need to have a supervisory board and employee representation as required by the German law of Mitbestimmung or co-determination.

In 2006, Air Berlin went public on the Frankfurt Stock Exchange. Originally scheduled for 5 May 2006, the IPO was postponed to 11 May 2006. The company said the delay was due to rises in fuel costs and other market pressures limiting investor demand. It reduced the initial share-price range from 15.0 to 17.5 euros to 11.5–14.5 euros. The stock opened at €12.0, selling a total of 42.5 million shares. Of these, 19.6 million were new shares increasing capital in the company, and the remainder to repay loans extended by the original shareholders and invested in the company earlier in 2006. After the IPO, the company claimed to have over 400 million euros in cash to fund further expansion, including aircraft purchases.

In August 2006, Air Berlin acquired German domestic airline dba. Flight operations at dba were continued as a fully owned subsidiary of Air Berlin until 14 November 2008, when the dba brand was discontinued due to staff strikes (dba staff were subsequently offered positions with Air Berlin).

On 28 November 2006, Air Berlin ordered 60 Boeing 737-800 aircraft, and 15 smaller Boeing 737-700 aircraft. The value of the 75 aircraft was 5.1 billion US dollars (based on list prices at the time.) Delivery of the aircraft started in 2007. All of these aircraft were equipped with blended winglets, to improve fuel efficiency.

=== 2007–2012: Takeovers, expansion and new alliances ===
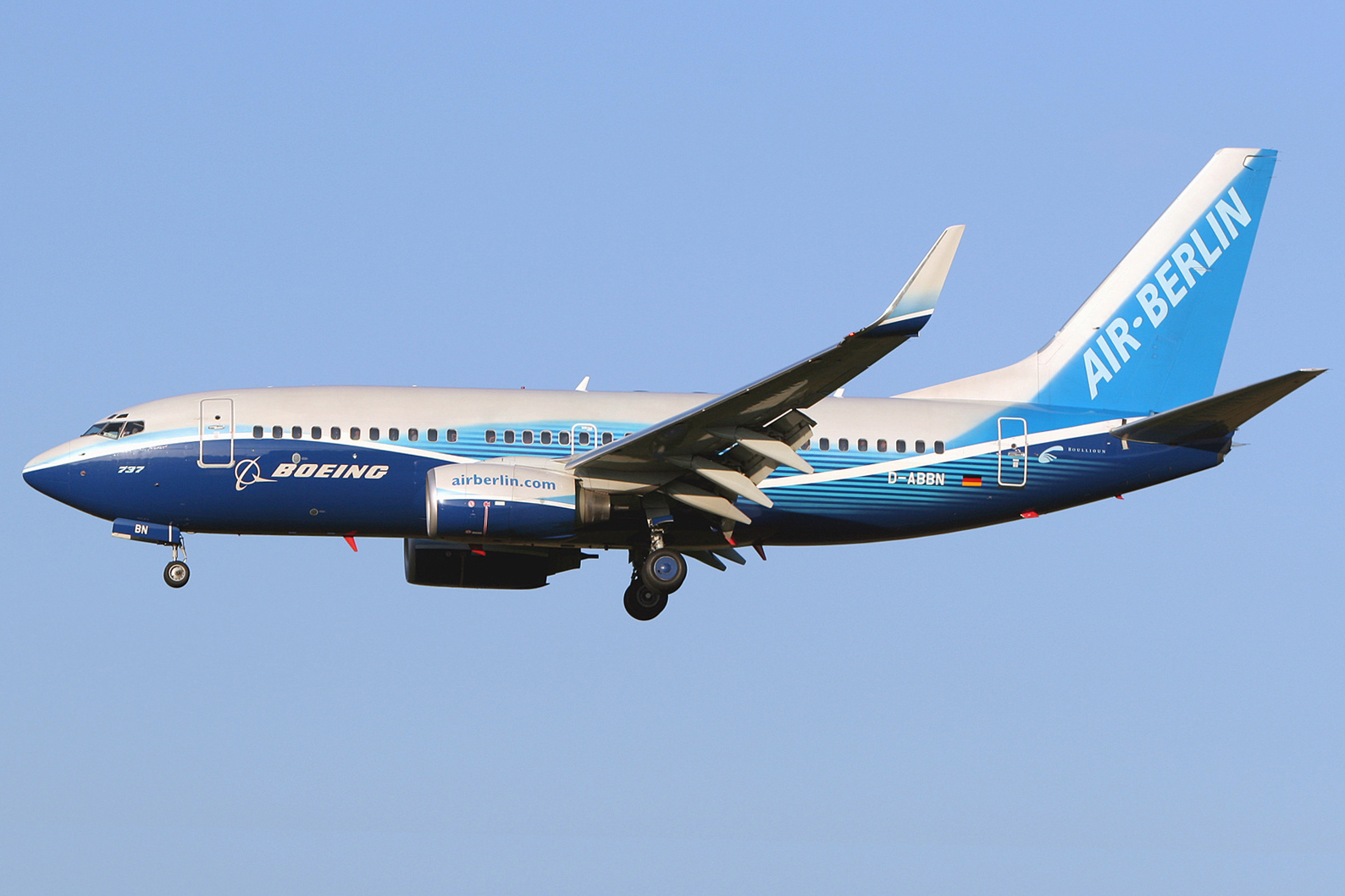
In 2005, one of Air Berlin's Boeing 737-700s featured a special livery promoting Boeing's Dreamliner program.

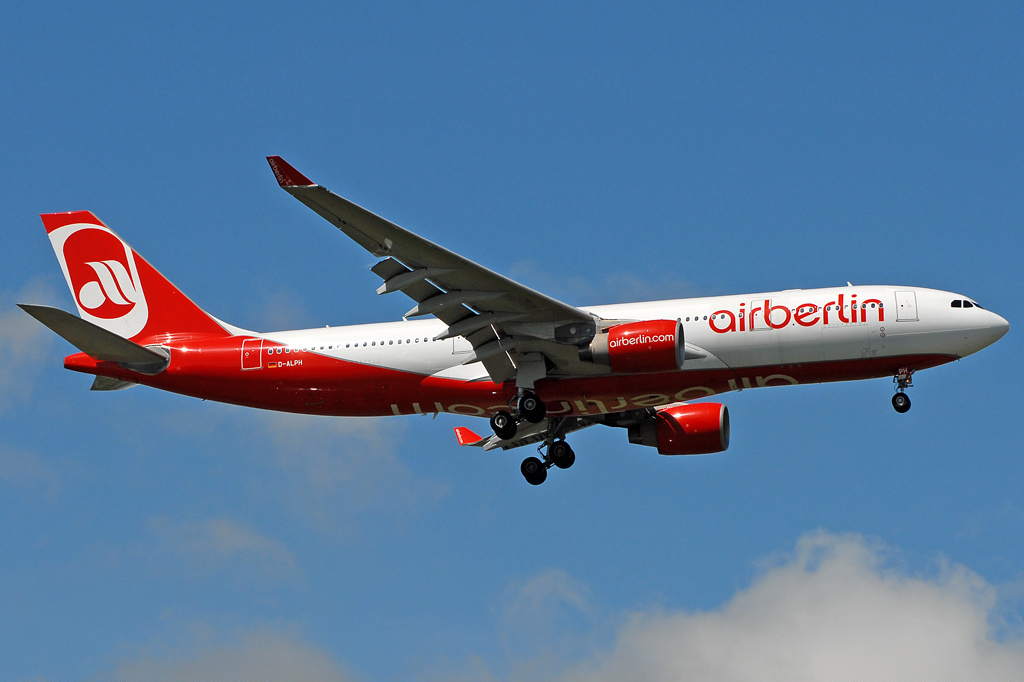
Following the takeover of LTU in 2007, the Airbus A330-200 (pictured) became part of Air Berlin's fleet.

In March 2007, Air Berlin took over German leisure airline LTU, gaining access to the long-haul market and becoming the fourth-largest airline group in Europe in terms of passenger traffic. This deal led to the introduction of Airbus A321 and Airbus A330 aircraft into Air Berlin's fleet. On 1 May 2009, the LTU brand was discontinued.

On 7 July 2007, Air Berlin announced an order for 25 Boeing 787-8 Dreamliner long-haul aircraft, with further options and purchase rights. Three additional aircraft of this type were to be leased from International Lease Finance Corporation.

On 21 August 2007, Air Berlin acquired a 49 percent shareholding in Swiss charter airline Belair, the remainder being owned by tour operator Hotelplan. Following the deal, Belair's long-haul business was terminated, and the fleet was replaced by Airbus A320 family aircraft operating scheduled flights on behalf of Air Berlin as well as charter flights for Hotelplan. On 20 September 2007, Air Berlin announced it intended to buy its competitor Condor in a deal that envisaged Condor's owner, Thomas Cook Group, taking a 30% stake in Air Berlin. However, the rapidly increasing price of jet fuel and other considerations led to the abandonment of the deal in July 2008.

In January 2008 Air Berlin introduced a new logo and corporate design. The logo is a white oval shape on a red background (suggesting an aircraft window) where the letter "a" is a white circle and two white stylised wings. The text "Air Berlin" was in lower case and written as one word. Sometimes the slogan "Your Airline" was featured as part of the logo. In June 2008, CEO Joachim Hunold offended Catalan language speakers, when he claimed in an article included in Air Berlin's in-flight magazine that the government of the Balearic Islands was trying to impose the use of Catalan on Air Berlin flights from and to Mallorca. He claimed that Air Berlin was an international airline and was not obliged to use Catalan. Hunold went on to criticise the language policy in Catalonia and the Balearic Islands, claiming that at the time many children could not speak any Spanish. The Balearic Islands' president, Francesc Antich, explained that his government had simply sent a letter to encourage airlines operating in the Balearic Islands to include Catalan among the languages used for onboard announcements.

On 18 June of the same year, Air Berlin announced that it would reduce its long-haul services by 13 percent and its domestic services by 10 percent to increase profitability. In September 2008, Air Berlin confirmed merger talks with competitor TUIfly, but added it was speaking with all parties. Air Berlin had, until 2007, been flying many code-share TUI flights. At the end of March 2009, Air Berlin PLC and TUI Travel PLC signed a deal by which their German flight businesses were to operate a long-term strategic alliance. Originally, each company was to take a 19.9% stake in the other and the German cartel authorities were petitioned for approval. After the Bundeskartellamt expressed concerns, the cross-ownership plan was not implemented. Instead, TUI Travel PLC purchased a 9.9% stake in Air Berlin PLC using a capital increase at a subsidiary to do so.

At the end of March 2009, a strategic partnership agreement with TUI Travel was signed, with Air Berlin and its competitor TUIfly purchasing 19.9 percent of the other's shares. Following the deal, Air Berlin took over all German domestic TUIfly routes, as well as those to Italy, Croatia and Austria. Also, all of Tuifly's Boeing 737-700 aircraft were added to Air Berlin's fleet. TUIfly was to abandon all scheduled flights and rely exclusively on the charter business.

In March 2009, ESAS Holding A.S., a Turkish company, bought approximately 15 per cent of the voting shares in Air Berlin. Also in 2009, Air Berlin added Hartmut Mehdorn to the board of directors after his retirement at Deutsche Bahn.

Air Berlin Group
Company	Interest
airberlin technik GmbH	100 %
airberlin Holidays GmbH	49 %
Belair	100 %
Niki	100 %

In April 2010 Air Berlin expanded its codeshare arrangements with Russia's S7 Airlines. Air Berlin and S7 Airlines had cooperated since October 2008. New services included codeshare flights via Moscow to Irkutsk, Perm and Rostov.

In July 2010, Air Berlin announced an increase in its shareholding in the Austrian airline Niki. Air Berlin indirectly acquired 25.9% of the shares in Niki from Privatstiftung Lauda (private Lauda foundation) and in doing so increased its shareholding in Niki from 24% to 49.9%. In connection with the increase of its shareholding, Air Berlin was to grant the private Lauda foundation a 40.5 million-euro loan. The private foundation had the options to repay the loan in three years with cash or through the transfer of the remaining 50.1% of Niki's shares.

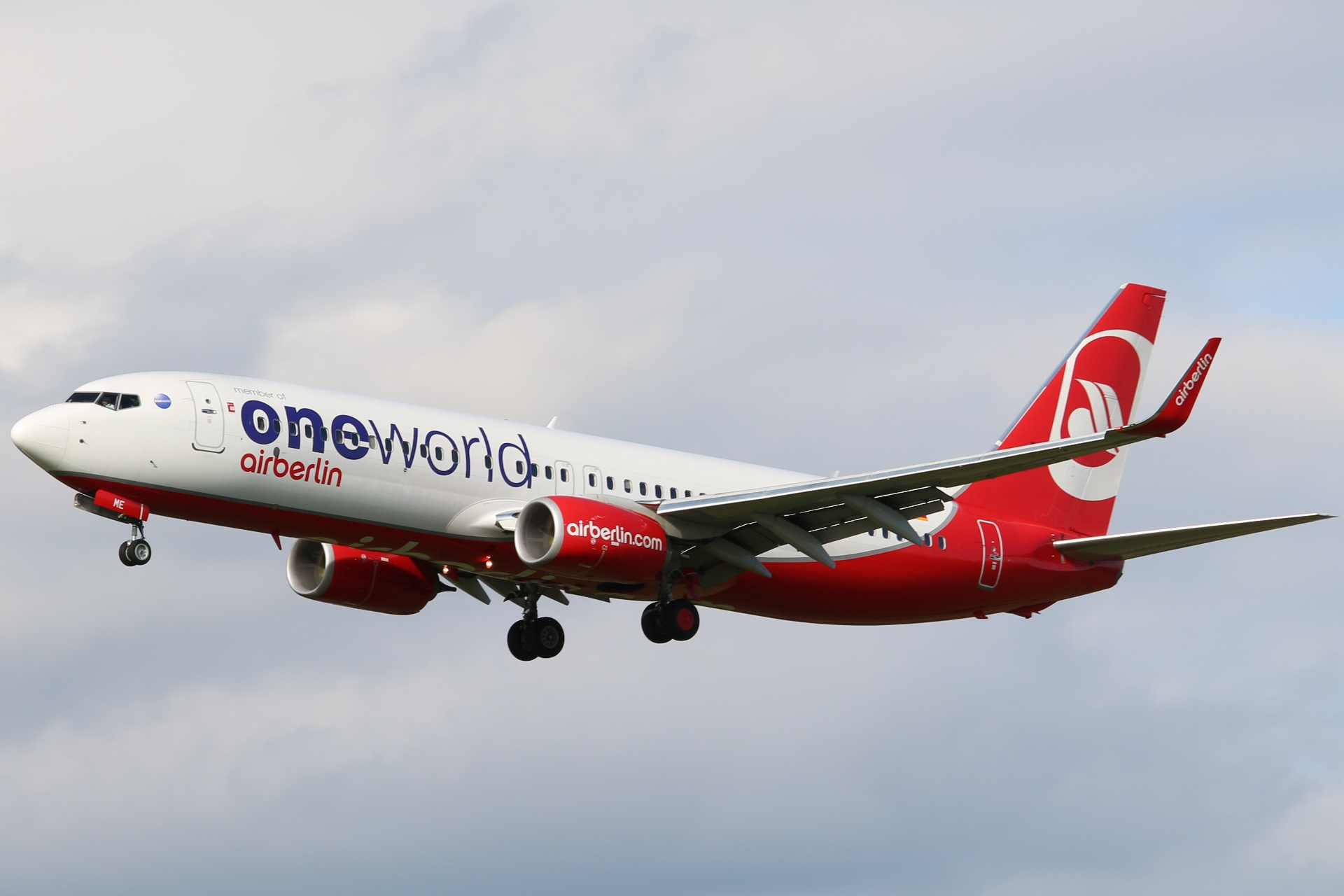
After becoming a member of Oneworld, several Air Berlin aircraft displayed the alliance's logo, as seen on this Boeing 737-800.

In July 2010, it was also announced that Air Berlin would join Oneworld, the global airline alliance. In preparation for joining the alliance, Air Berlin made codeshare agreements with Finnair and American Airlines starting with the 2010/2011 winter schedule.

An Airbus A330 with a special livery promoting Berlin Brandenburg Airport.

Air Berlin planned to operate an airline hub at Berlin Brandenburg Airport together with its Oneworld partners from the originally planned opening in 2012. The delayed opening of the new airport made it difficult to operate a hub, as the infrastructure at Tegel was not designed for a hub.

Air Berlin founded Follow Me Entertainment GmbH in September 2010 as a joint venture with kick-media ag. This joint-venture company markets image and sound media, books, games as well as events, concerts, tournaments and sponsoring.

On 1 April 2011 Air Berlin completed the integration of LTU. All Air Berlin Group technical services were consolidated in a new company called airberlin technik GmbH. It also added new routes, more frequent flights and additional long-haul flights from Düsseldorf. On 15 June 2011, Air Berlin and British Airways reached a codeshare agreement covering some flights within Europe, starting from 5 July 2011. The agreement applied to flights to over forty European destinations served by the two airlines. CEO Joachim Hunold resigned from his position on 1 September 2011 and was succeeded by the former CEO of Deutsche Bahn AG, Hartmut Mehdorn, who led the company on an interim basis until January 2013.

In November 2011 Air Berlin and Pegasus Airlines (Turkey's largest private airline) launched Air Berlin Turkey, aiming at the charter market between Germany and Turkey. Pegasus Airlines is 16.5% owned by ESAS Holding AS. In the third quarter of 2011, the turnover of the company amounted to 1.4 billion euros, an increase of 11%. However, operating profit decreased by almost 50% to around 97 million euros. As a result, a new bond to raise additional capital was issued. In November 2011 Air Berlin took over the remaining 50.1% stake in NIKI as repayment of a loan and became its sole owner. The brand name was retained and Niki Lauda was given a position on the board of Air Berlin.

Air Berlin announced on 19 December 2011 that Etihad Airways had increased its share of Air Berlin from 2.99% to 29.1%, for a sum of 73 million euros, making Etihad the company's largest shareholder. The deal supplied more cash to Air Berlin, and provided Etihad access to Air Berlin's European network.

=== 2012–2015: Restructuring amid continuing losses ===
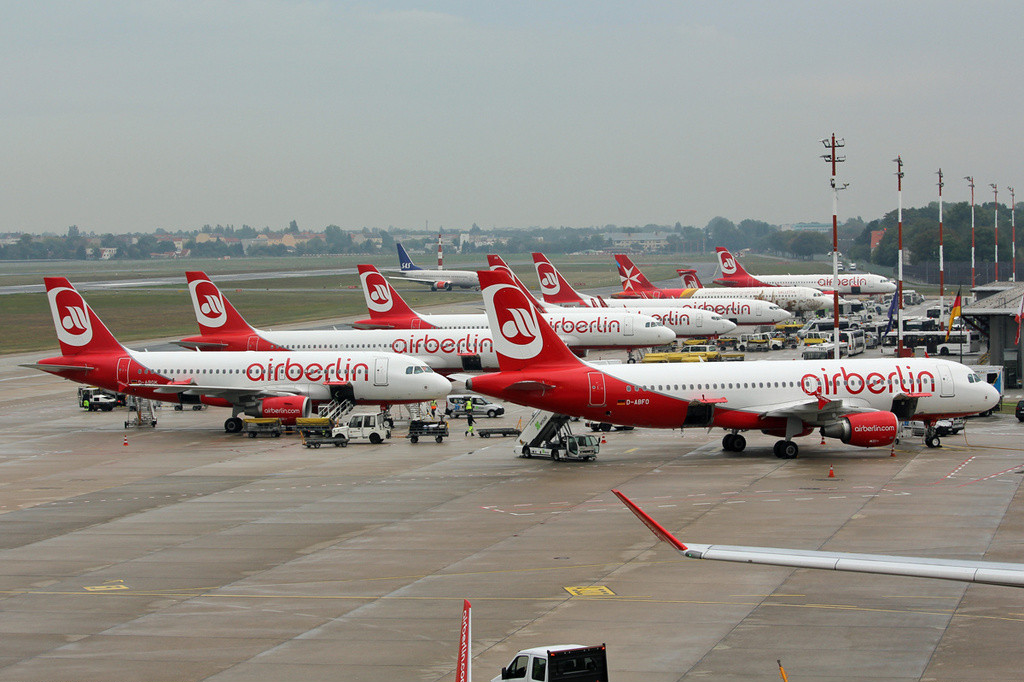
Air Berlin aircraft at Terminal C of Berlin Tegel Airport in September 2014

The cooperation of the frequent-flyer programs topbonus and Etihad Guest was announced in March 2012. In June 2012, the collaboration concluded with the bonus programs airberlin business points and Etihad Airways Business Connect for SMBs.

On 20 March 2012, the entry into Oneworld was officially completed. The Oneworld network offered over 800 destinations in 150 countries. At the same time, the airline introduced the Platinum status for its frequent-flyer program topbonus. In May 2012 Air Berlin presented its new fare structure "Your Fare" including "Just Fly", "Fly Classic" and "FlyFlex" for flights from 1 July 2012. On 11 May 2012 Air Berlin opened its triweekly non-stop flight from Berlin to Los Angeles in the summer schedule, a destination which until then had only been served from Düsseldorf. On 18 December 2012 Air Berlin announced that topbonus, its frequent flyer program, would be sold to Etihad Airways; only a 30-percent minority share would be retained. Air Berlin also announced the expansion of the existing codeshare agreement with Etihad Airways on 20 December 2012.

In January 2013, the first Airbus A330-200 was introduced with a new business class which enabled a fully flat position for the first time. On 7 January 2013 Air Berlin appointed Austrian Wolfgang Prock-Schauer, former Chief Strategy and Planning Officer, as the company's CEO, replacing Hartmut Mehdorn.

Air Berlin started flights between Berlin and Chicago on 23 March 2013. It cancelled the seasonal non-stop flights to Las Vegas, San Francisco and Vancouver. In March 2013 Air Berlin announced the closure of its seasonal hub for leisure destinations at Nuremberg Airport. Only ten year-round direct routes remained.

On 24 September 2014, Air Berlin cancelled the remaining 15 orders for their Boeing 787s as well as 18 remaining orders for Boeing 737-800s as part of their restructuring programme. In October 2014, the Luftfahrt-Bundesamt denied Air Berlin authorization to operate 34 routes as a codeshare with co-owner Etihad from the 2014/2015 winter schedule as they would contravene the bilateral traffic rights between Germany and the UAE. Also in October 2014, Air Berlin announced the termination of flights to Palma de Mallorca from both Bremen Airport and Dortmund Airport, therefore withdrawing entirely from these two German airports.

Air Berlin announced a net loss for 2014 of €376m (€316m loss in 2013). The airline's revenues in 2014 stagnated at €4.16 billion.

In September 2015, Air Berlin phased out the last Boeing 737-700s owned by the company. The remaining aircraft of this type would operate on a wet lease basis from TUIfly until 2019. All Boeing 737-800s were to be phased out by 2016 as Air Berlin plans to focus their short- and medium-haul fleet on the Airbus A320 family to cut costs. In November 2015, Air Berlin announced the closure of its Palma de Mallorca Airport hub by ceasing all of the hub's seven Spanish domestic routes by 3 April 2016. Some days earlier, the airline announced plans to add flights from Düsseldorf to Boston, Dallas/Fort Worth, San Francisco and Havana by spring 2016. However, the planned route to Dallas/Fort Worth was cancelled a few weeks later due to low demand. On 30 December 2015, the administrative court in Braunschweig ruled in favour of the German civil aviation authority (the Luftfahrt-Bundesamt) and against Air Berlin regarding some of their codeshare operations with Etihad Airways. The shared sale and advertising of 31 out of 83 routes which were marketed by both were declared illegal and ordered stopped by 15 January 2016 as they were not covered by the bilateral air-traffic agreement between Germany and the UAE. The Luftfahrt-Bundesamt had allowed these flights until a definite legal ruling was made.

=== 2016–2017: Restructuring efforts ===
In April 2016, Air Berlin announced a record loss of €446 million for 2015; the airline's revenues had decreased to €4.08 billion. Amongst the reasons considered for Air Berlin's poor performance were: crippling debt of over €800m; unclear and rapid strategy changes on routes and advertising; several CEOs over recent years; a five-year-plus delay to the new hub Berlin Brandenburg Airport; failed negotiations to profit from lower fuel prices and the overall harsh competition in the airline industry. In July 2016, Air Berlin confirmed that it no longer owned any of the aircraft it operates, having sold and leased back the last of the aircraft it had previously owned. A few weeks later it was reported that Air Berlin and Etihad Airways were in talks with Lufthansa regarding the latter's acquisition of some of Air Berlin's routes outside of the Berlin and Düsseldorf hubs as well as some staff and aircraft leases. Also in July 2016, Air Berlin announced the increase of flights to the United States from 55 to 78 nonstops per week for 2017. Besides some frequency increases, Los Angeles and San Francisco were to be served from Berlin as well as by the then existing Düsseldorf routes. And a new Düsseldorf-Orlando route was announced. A few days later, the airline announced the introduction of a business class on its short- and medium-haul flights.

In December 2016, Air Berlin announced Stefan Pichler's departure after serving two years as CEO and replacement by former head of Germanwings, Thomas Winkelmann on 1 February.

==== The "new Air Berlin" project ====
On 28 September 2016, Air Berlin announced The new airberlin, a restructuring project including the reduction of its destinations from around 140 to 70, the focus on the Berlin and Düsseldorf hubs and on the smaller bases in Stuttgart and Munich, the closure of six other bases, the targeting of business travellers, focus on domestic German flights and on flights to Italy, Scandinavia and eastern Europe, the expansion of its long-haul network, and the loss of up to 1,200 jobs.

Air Berlin, including its subsidiaries Belair and Niki, planned to cut 40 of its fleet of 118 narrowbody jets, leaving Air Berlin with its own fleet of 75 aircraft. The new fleet would be 17 Airbus A330-200 for long-haul operations and 40 Airbus A320 family aircraft and 18 Bombardier Q400 aircraft for European routes. A separate, tourist-destination-oriented unit with 35 aircraft was to be formed, perhaps operating with a partner (TUIfly was the assumed partner as they already operate several aircraft for Air Berlin) – or sold altogether. Plans to wet lease the remaining aircraft were realised with the December 2016 announcement that 38 Airbus A319/A320 aircraft would be wet leased to Lufthansa Group's Eurowings (33 aircraft) and Austrian Airlines (five), effective February 2017 for a period of six years.

In October 2016, Air Berlin announced plans to close four of its seven airberlin Technik maintenance facilities and lay off 500 of their staff. On 5 December 2016, Air Berlin announced plans to sell its entire 49-percent stake in its Austrian subsidiary Niki to its own minority owner, Etihad Airways. It was also announced that Niki will take over several routes to southern European, north African and Turkish leisure destinations from Air Berlin as part of the new joint-venture. Also in December 2016, Air Berlin announced the transfer of its entire fleet of 21 A321-200s to Niki and Niki's transfer of all its 5 A319-100s and 13 A320-200s to Air Berlin. Air Berlin would discontinue its wet lease with TUIfly.

In January 2017, Air Berlin announced that for summer 2017, most leisure routes were to be either transferred to Niki or cancelled altogether and that some domestic and European city routes were to be dropped, leaving little more than the Berlin-Tegel and Düsseldorf hub operations. On 28 April 2017, a loss of € −781.9 million was announced for 2016, from a revenue of €3.79 billion. Also in late April 2017, Air Berlin confirmed the creation of Air Berlin Aeronautics GmbH, a new subsidiary which was to have its own operational licence (AOC) to take over the wet lease operations handled by Air Berlin on behalf of Eurowings and Austrian Airlines. Therefore, the "actual" Air Berlin would focus on operations under its own brand name. In May 2017, Air Berlin announced it would buy Luftfahrtgesellschaft Walter entirely, in which it had a controlling stake since 2009.

==== Bankruptcy ====
After Etihad stopped financial support, Air Berlin entered insolvency procedures on 15 August 2017. On 9 October 2017, Air Berlin told its staff that it would cease all remaining operations under its own AB flight numbers due to its negative financial outlook and bankruptcy proceedings. On 12 October 2017, Lufthansa Group agreed to buy 81 aircraft and employ 3,000 Air Berlin employees for €210 million, taking over the subsidiaries Niki and Luftfahrtgesellschaft Walter with a total of 1700 employees. On 24 October 2017, the Berliner Zeitfracht Group confirmed it would take over the Leisure Cargo Düsseldorf company and its 60 employees. The creditors' committee approved a corresponding submission. Leisure Cargo conveys freight space on passenger flights. On 27 October 2017, it was announced that a 'consortium' of maintenance, repair, and operations provider Nayak Aircraft Services GmbH & Co. KG and Berliner Zeitfracht Group would purchase airberlin Technik, keeping over 300 employees.

The final long-haul flight, from Miami to Düsseldorf, was operated on 15 October 2017. On 27 October 2017, Air Berlin's final flight was operated by Airbus A320 D-ABNW. It departed from Munich at 21:36 and landed at Berlin Tegel at 22:45. On 28 October 2017, it was announced that EasyJet would absorb 1,000 employees and lease 25 Airbus A320 aircraft for flights from Berlin Tegel for €40 million.

Just over six years after filing for bankruptcy and ceasing all flight operations, Air Berlin's trademark rights were sold to Marcos Rossello, the founder and CEO of Sundair.

== Corporate affairs ==
=== Head office ===
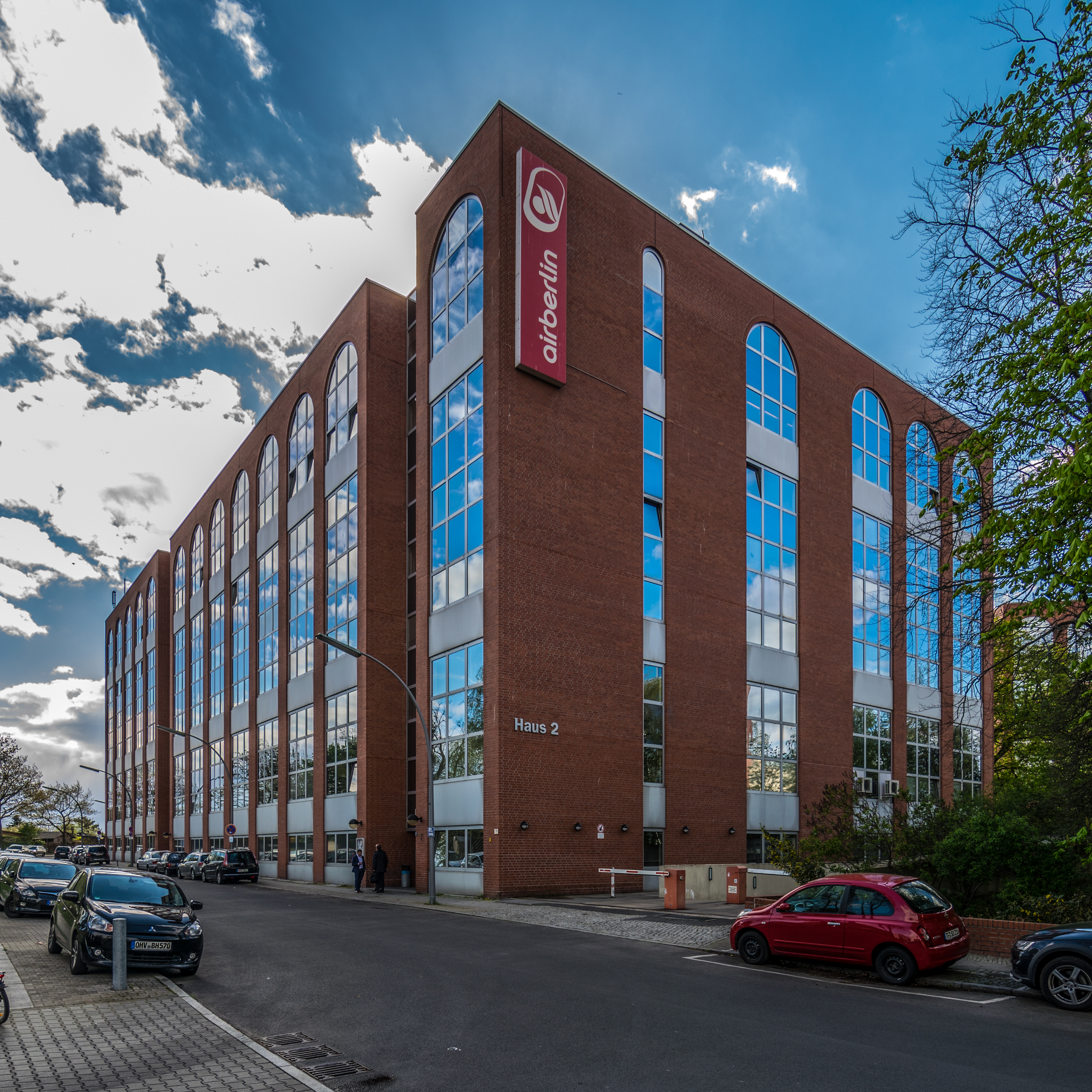
Air Berlin's former headquarters at the Airport Bureau Center in Charlottenburg-Wilmersdorf, Berlin.

The airline was headquartered at the Airport Bureau Center in Charlottenburg-Wilmersdorf, Berlin.

=== Flight school ===
Air Berlin trained its own pilots since 2007 in a joint venture with the TFC Käufer flight school. Commercial pilot training lasted around 24 months. The Air Berlin flight school was the first flight school in Germany to be awarded a training licence by the German Department of Aviation for the new Multi-Crew Pilot Licence concept in February 2009.

=== Technical services ===
Air Berlin had its own maintenance and overhaul branch, airberlin technik with facilities in Berlin, Düsseldorf, Munich, Stuttgart, Frankfurt, Hamburg, and Nuremberg, which employed 1300 staff as of October 2016. The technical branch was a certified EASA Part-145 maintenance organization with approximately 1200 employees providing services to both Air Berlin group aircraft and customers throughout Europe. airberlin technik was recognized and approved by various National Airworthiness Authorities such as USA FAA-145, Canadian CAA-145, Aruba EASA-145, Federal Aviation Authority of Russia, GCAA, United Arab Emirates. In October 2016, Air Berlin announced it would close the technical bases in Stuttgart, Frankfurt, Hamburg and Nuremberg while laying off 500 staff due to restructuring measures.

=== Ownership ===
Air Berlin PLC shares were publicly traded on Xetra and on the Frankfurt Stock Exchange in the regulated market. Trading in the regulated unofficial market occurred at the exchanges in Berlin, Düsseldorf, Hamburg, Munich and Stuttgart. Since December 2011, Etihad Airways was the largest shareholder in Air Berlin. As of December 2015, the major shareholders (over 5%) were:

Name	Interest
Etihad Airways PJSC	29.21%
ESAS Holding AS (owners of Pegasus Airlines)	12.02%
Other shareholders	58.77%
Total	100.00 %

=== Business trends ===
Air Berlin was loss-making for several years. The key figures for the whole Air Berlin Group (including Niki) for the full years of operation leading up to its closure were (as at year ending 31 December):

	2006	2007	2008	2009	2010	2011	2012	2013	2014	2015	2016
Turnover (€m)	1,575	2,537	3,401	3,240	3,850	4,227	4,312	4,147	4,160	4,081	3,785
Net profit (€m)	40.1	21.0	−75.0	−9.5	−106.3	−420.4	6.8	−315.5	−376.7	−446.6	−781.9
Number of employees	4,108	8,360	8,311	8,278	8,900	9,113	9,284	8,905	8,440	8,869	8,481
Number of passengers (m)	19.7	27.9	28.6	27.9	34.9	35.3	33.3	31.5	31.7	30.2	28.9
Passenger load factor (%)	75.3	77.3	78.4	77.5	76.8	84.5	83.6	84.9	83.5	84.2	84.3
Number of aircraft (at year end)	117	124	125	152	169	170	155	140	149	153	144
Notes/sources											

== Destinations ==
Prior to its shutdown, Air Berlin flew to scheduled year-round and seasonal destinations in Europe. Intercontinental services were provided to cities in North and Central America, North Africa and the Caribbean.

=== Codeshare agreements ===
Air Berlin maintained codeshare agreements with the following airlines:

- Air Serbia
- Air Seychelles
- airBaltic
- Alitalia
- American Airlines
- Austrian Airlines
- Bangkok Airways
- British Airways
- Bulgaria Air
- Czech Airlines
- Darwin Airline
- Etihad Airways
- Eurowings
- Finnair
- Flybe
- Hainan Airlines
- Iberia
- Japan Airlines
- Jet Airways
- Lufthansa
- Meridiana
- Niki
- Pegasus Airlines
- Royal Jordanian
- S7 Airlines
- SriLankan Airlines
- Swiss International Air Lines
- Virgin Australia

== Fleet ==
=== Fleet at closure ===
Aircraft type	In service	Passengers			Remarks
Aircraft type	In service	C	Y	Total	Remarks
Airbus A319-100	11	4	146	150	Leased to Eurowings
Airbus A320-200	64	—	165	165	21 leased to Eurowings
Airbus A320-200	64	4	176	180	21 leased to Eurowings
Airbus A330-200	17	19	271	290	
Bombardier Dash 8 Q400	20	3	70	73	Operated by LGW
Total	112				

== Gallery ==
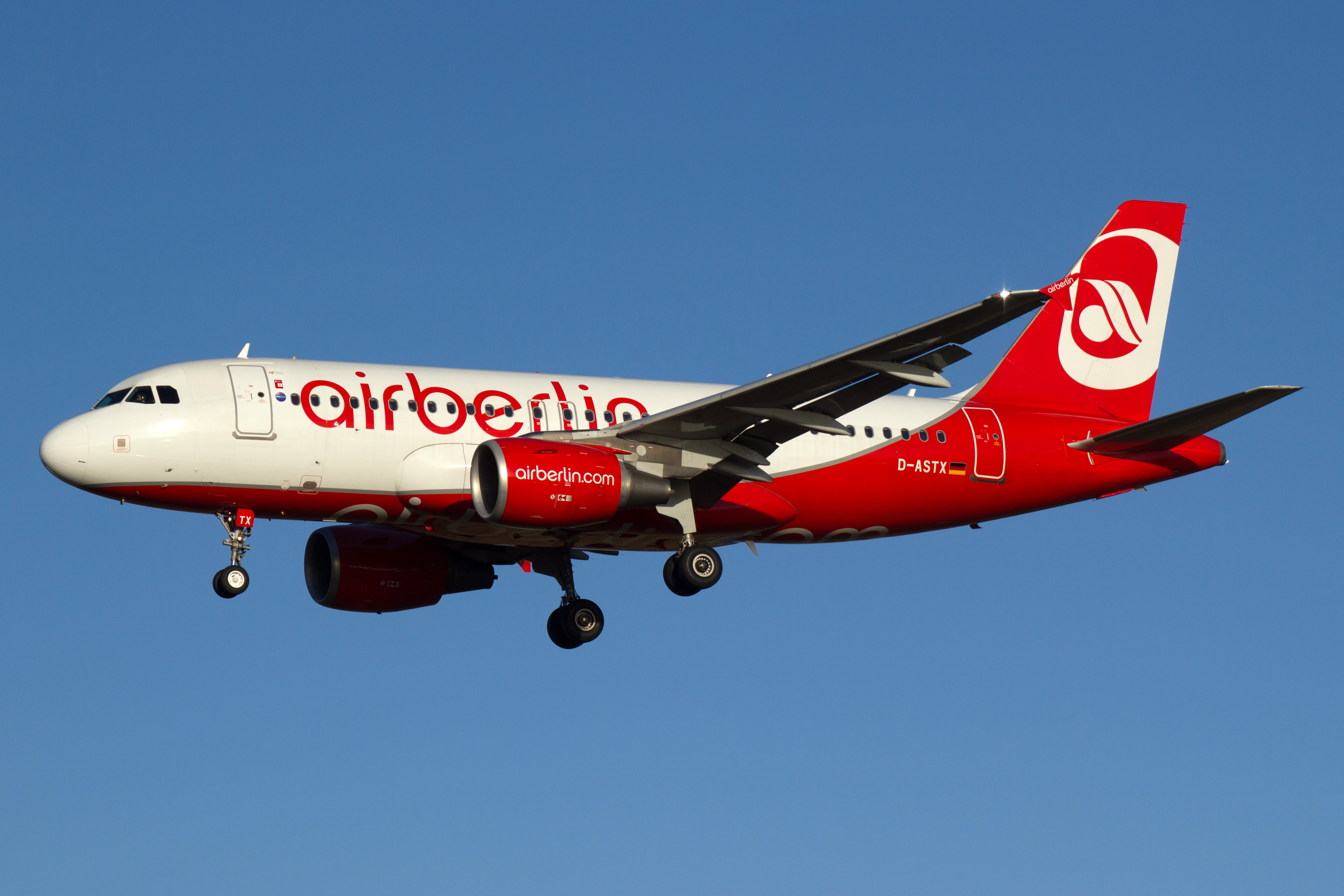
Airbus A319-100

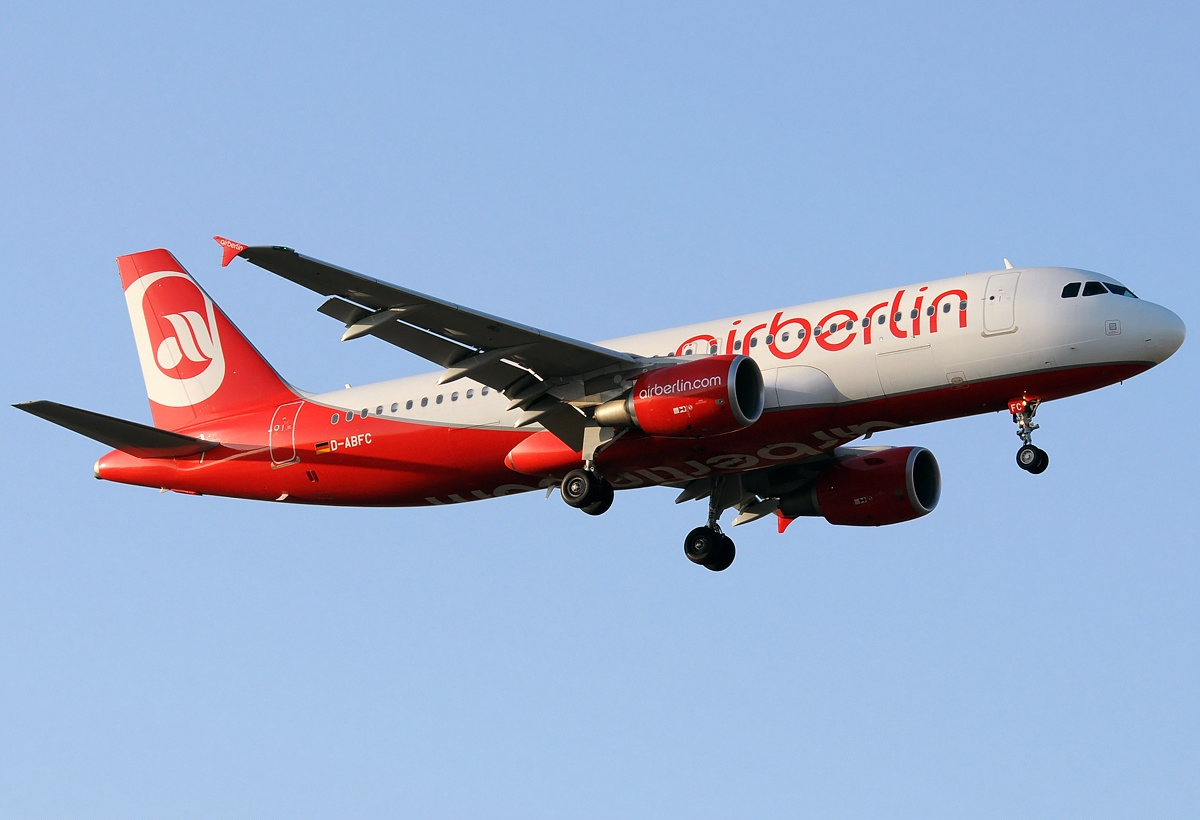
Airbus A320-200

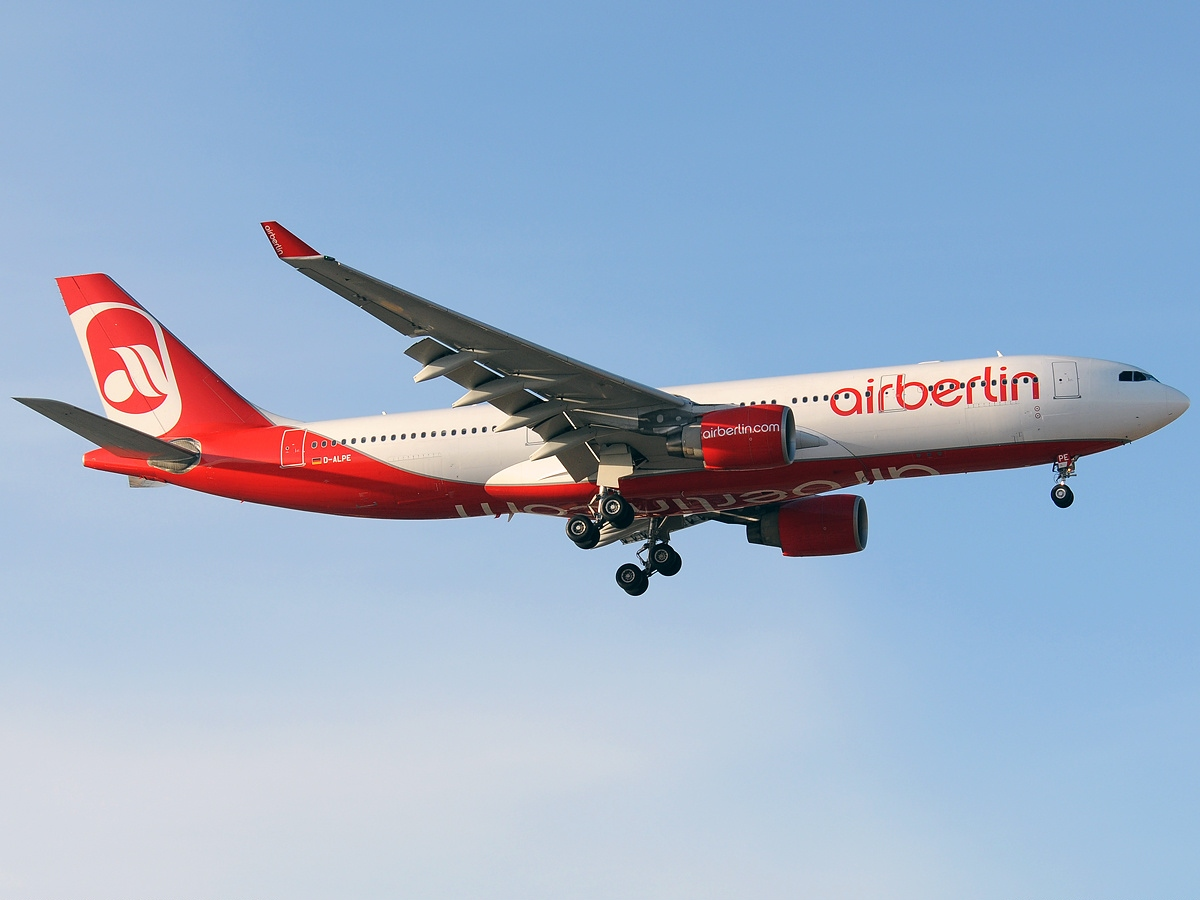
Airbus A330-200

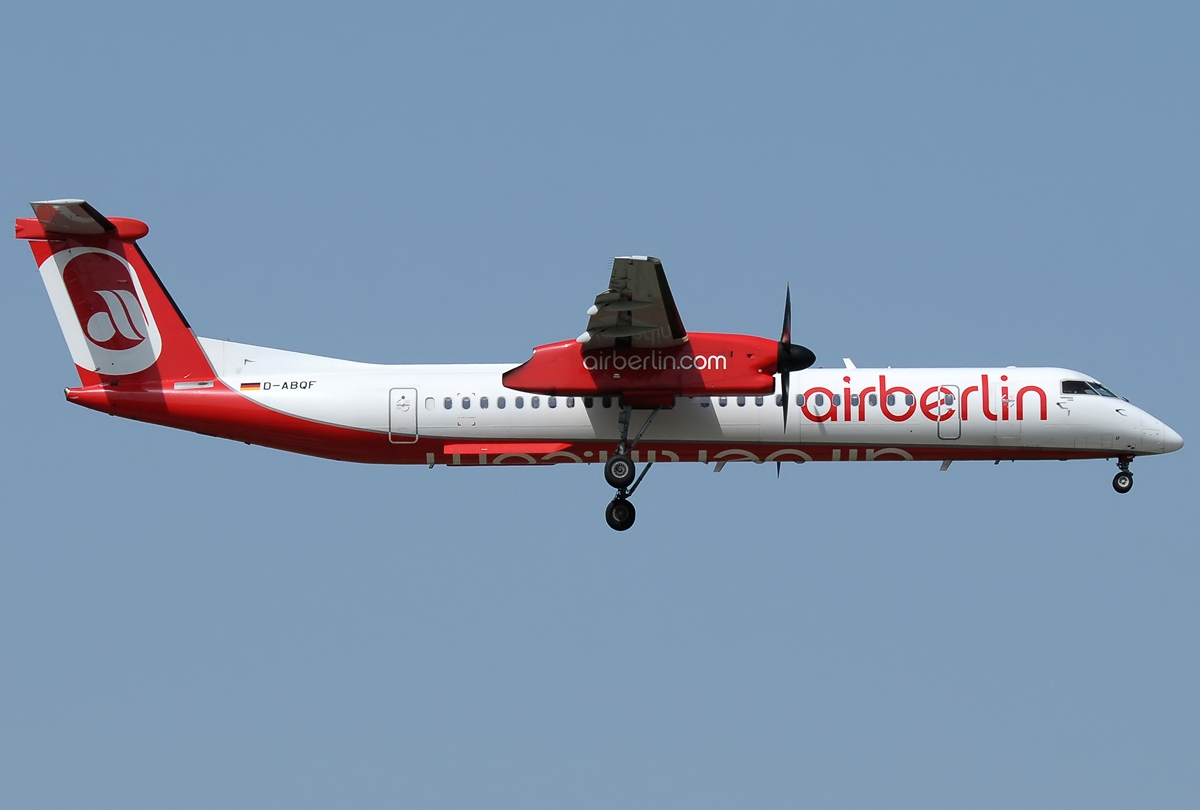
Bombardier Dash 8 Q400

=== Historic fleet ===
During its 40 years of operation, Air Berlin operated the following aircraft types:

Aircraft type	Total	Introduced	Retired	Remarks
Airbus A319-100	21	2006	2017	Operated for Eurowings.
Airbus A320-200	117	2005	2017	10 acquired from LTU. 17 operated for Eurowings. 4 operated for Austrian Airlines. 27 purchased by Lufthansa. 25 transferred to easyJet.
Airbus A321-200	23	2008	2017	4 acquired from LTU.
Airbus A330-200	17	2008	2017	8 acquired from LTU. 6 leased by Malaysia Airlines. 10 sold to other airlines. 1 stored in LDE.
Airbus A330-300	3	2008	2013	Acquired from LTU.
British Aerospace BAe 146-200	3	2003	2004	
Boeing 707-123	1	1980	1980	Operated by Air Berlin USA.
Boeing 707-321	1	1981	1981	Operated by Air Berlin USA.
Boeing 707-331	3	1979	1981	Operated by Air Berlin USA.
Boeing 737-200	5	1980	1986	Operated by Air Berlin USA.
Boeing 737-300	1	1986	1990	Operated by Air Berlin USA.
Boeing 737-300	10	2007	2010	Operated by Germania.
Boeing 737-400	13	1990	2007	
Boeing 737-700	32	2003	2017	Operated by TUI fly Deutschland.
Boeing 737-800	100	1998	2017	Last remaining active fleet was operated by TUI fly Deutschland.
Bombardier Dash 8 Q400	20	2008	2017	Operated by LGW.
Embraer 190	3	2013	2013	Transferred from Niki and subsequently returned, then operated by LGW.
Fokker 100	18	2004	2010	
Total	391			

== Services ==
=== Aircraft cabins ===
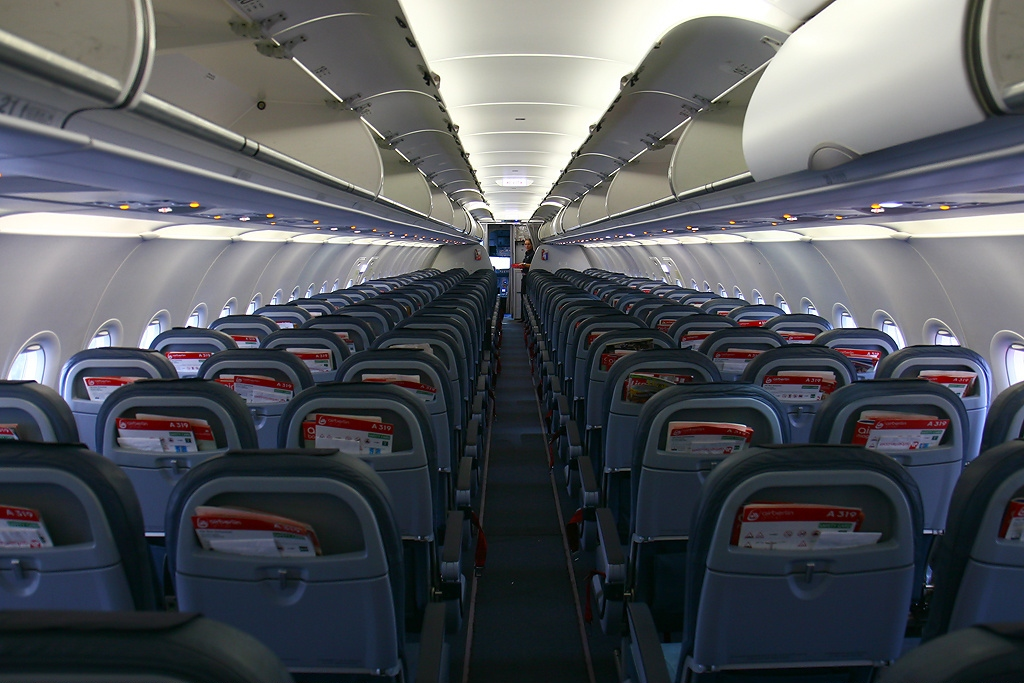
Air Berlin Airbus A319-100 cabin

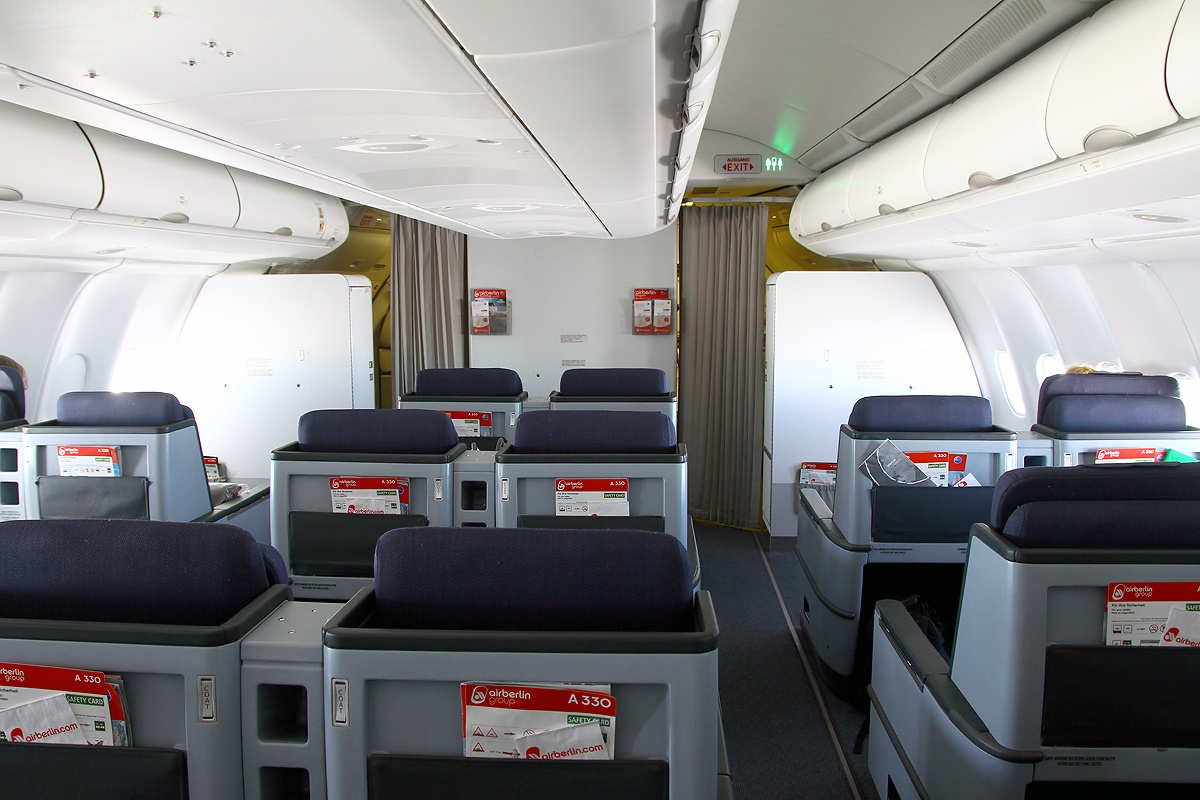
Former Air Berlin long-haul business class cabin

==== Long-haul flights ====
Air Berlin long-haul aircraft featured business and economy class sections. At the beginning of 2012, Air Berlin started the renewal of its long-haul cabin, equipping both economy class and business class with new seats and a new in-flight entertainment system. Fully automatic seats that could tilt up to 170 degrees were provided in business class, along with an anti-thrombosis edition and an adjustable headrest, and more legroom and a narrower seat back in economy class. All seats have an 8.9-inch monitor with a touch screen and offer movies, series, music, audiobooks and games. In January 2013 the airline again presented a new business class which replaced the one introduced a year earlier. The new business class had single seats, offering travellers even more privacy. The new seats had a full-flat function, a massage function, and featured a 15-inch monitor.

==== Short- and medium-haul flights ====
Business class was not offered on its short- and medium-haul flights until Air Berlin announced its introduction in August 2016. All short- and medium-haul aircraft began to feature business class in row 1 with expanded services including an empty middle seat.

=== Passenger services ===
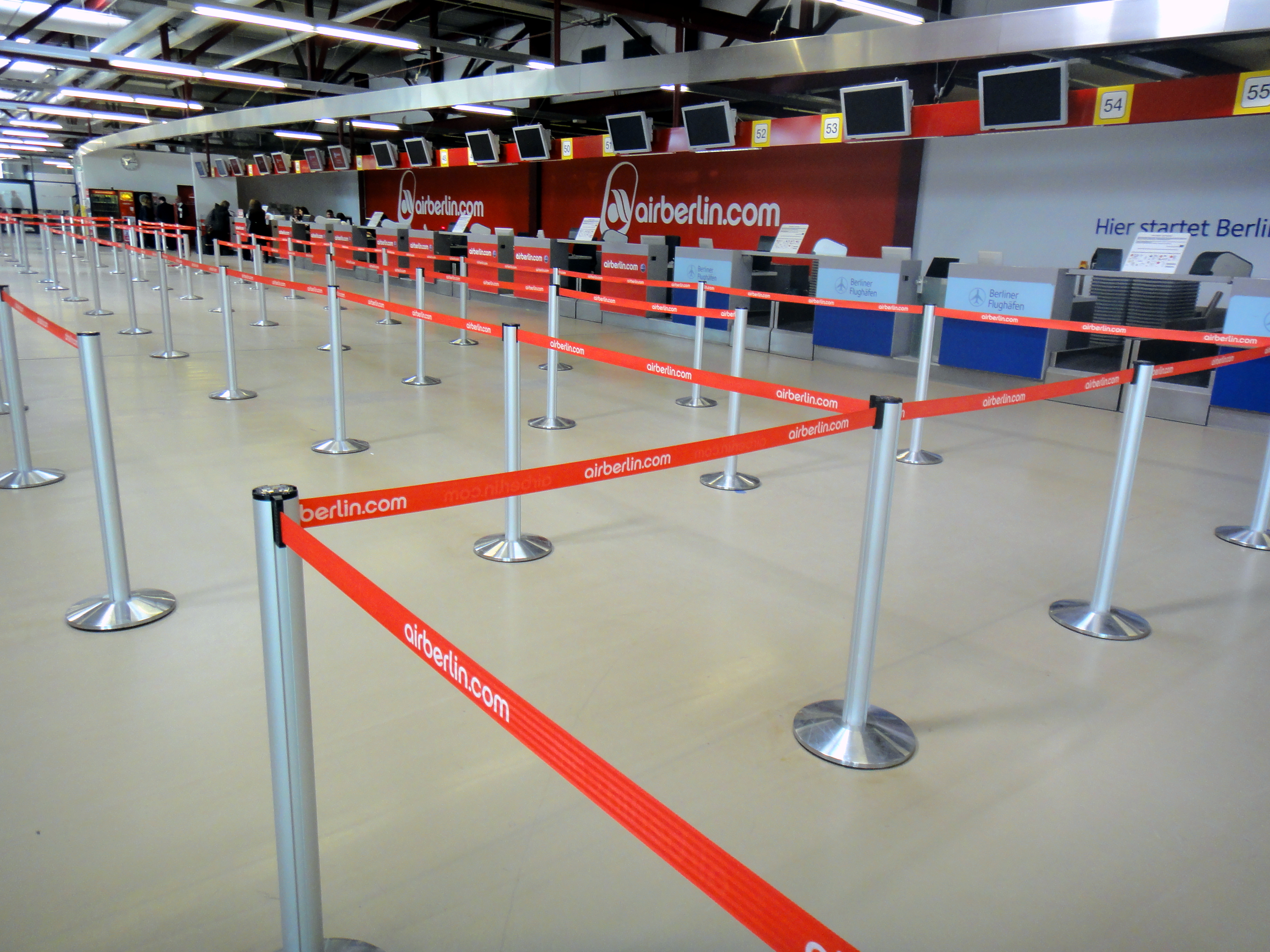
Air Berlin check-in counters

In contrast to European pure low-cost carriers, Air Berlin offered free in-flight snacks and drinks until September 2016. Newspapers and magazines were available on domestic German flights. Full hot meals were complimentary on long-haul flights. On all Air Berlin routes with a flight time of 60 minutes or longer, gourmet meals were offered, which were, according to the airline, created by chefs at Sansibar, a famous restaurant on the island of Sylt. The airline also offered in-flight entertainment, assigned seating and guaranteed flight connections. Air Berlin's basic fares were nonrefundable and not changeable, so unused flights were a complete loss for the purchaser.

=== Frequent flyer program ===
Air Berlin's frequent flyer program was called topbonus. Points, known as miles, could be collected on flights operated by Air Berlin, Niki, Oneworld airline partners, and selected other airlines. Accrued miles could be redeemed for award flights, or for an upgrade to business class. In addition to the entry-level "topbonus Card Classic" there were cards with Silver, Gold, and Platinum status, corresponding to Oneworld Ruby, Sapphire, and Emerald statuses. A Service Card and a Credit Card, for which a charge was made, were also available. Etihad Airways purchased a 70% stake in topbonus for €184 million in 2012. Following the insolvency of Air Berlin, topbonus also filed for insolvency on 25 August 2017.

== See also ==
- List of airlines of Germany
- List of companies of Germany
- Transport in Germany

== Notes ==
Notes

== Citations ==
=== Bibliography ===
- Berlin Airport Company – Monthly Timetable Booklet for Berlin Tempelhof and Berlin Tegel Airports, several issues (German language edition only), 1968–1992. West Berlin, Germany: Berlin Airport Company.
- "Flight International". Flight International - Marketing Stories. Sutton, UK: Reed Business Information. ISSN 0015-3710. (various backdated issues relating to Air Berlin, 1979–2007)
- "Airways — A Global Review of Commercial Flight (The Two Faces of Air Berlin), pp. 30–35". Airways: A Global Review of Commercial Flight. 17, 9. Sandpoint, ID, US: Airways International Inc. November 2010. ISSN 1074-4320.
