= IZair =

Airline of Turkey (2005–2018)

İzmir Airlines
| IATA | ICAO | Call sign |
|---|---|---|
| — | IZM | IZMIR |
- Founded: 2005; 21 years ago
- Commenced operations: 14 June 2006; 20 years ago
- Ceased operations: 30 December 2018; 7 years ago (re-integrated into Pegasus Airlines)
- Operating bases: Antalya; Izmir
- Parent company: Air Berlin (2011–2013); Pegasus Airlines
- Headquarters: İzmir, Turkey
- Key people: Ali Sabancı (President)
- Website: www.izair.com.tr

IZair (İzmir Hava Yolları) was an airline headquartered on the grounds of Adnan Menderes Airport in İzmir, Turkey.

== History ==
The airline was established in 2005 as İzmir Hava Yolları by a group of businessmen from İzmir. It started operations on 14 June 2006.

Starting in 2012, all IZair flights were marketed under the Air Berlin Turkey brand, a cooperation between Air Berlin and Pegasus Airlines. The cooperation was discontinued in 2013, with the brand itself being abandoned.

On 29 February 2012 the last remaining Airbus A319-100 was returned to the lessor.

In November 2018, it was announced that IZair would be dissolved and merged into Pegasus Airlines by the end of 2018.

== Fleet ==
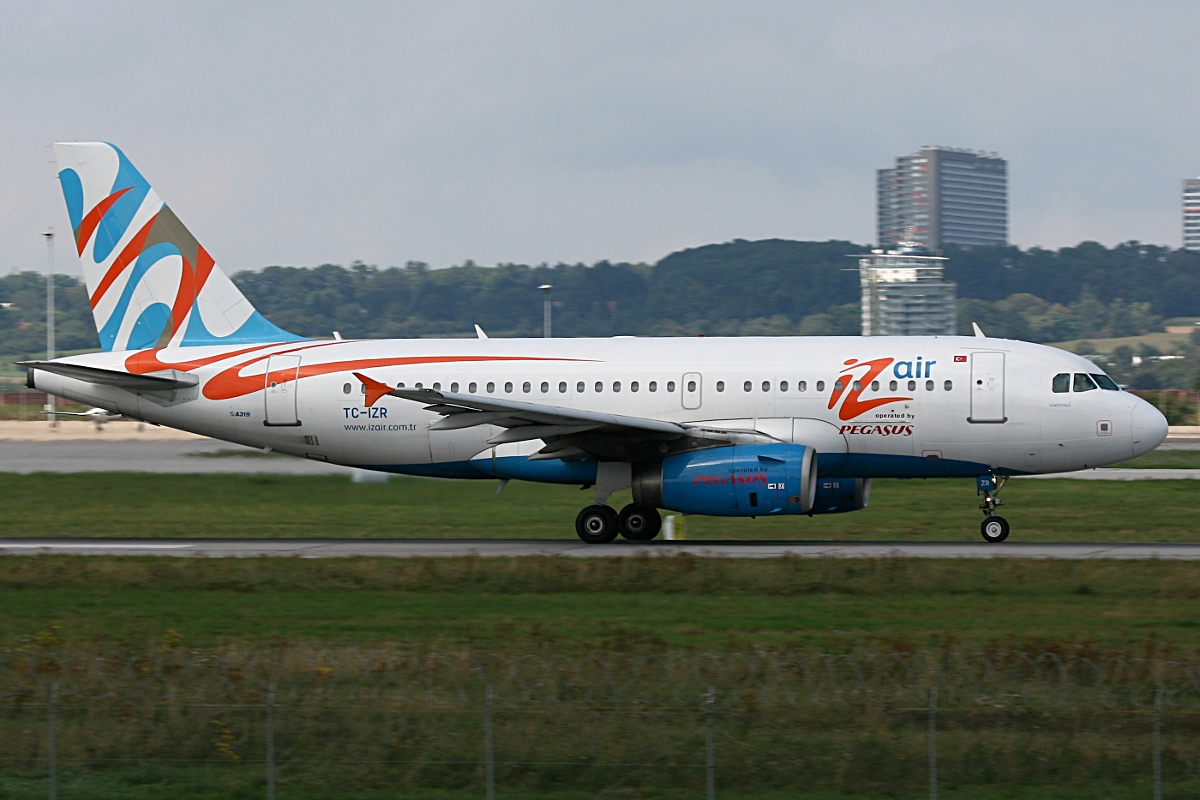
An IZair Airbus A319 at Stuttgart Airport, Germany (2009). This aircraft was involved in the 2010 incident at Frankfurt.

The IZair fleet consisted of the following aircraft, all of which were operated for Pegasus Airlines (as of February 2020):

| Aircraft | Total | Passengers | Notes |
|---|---|---|---|
| Boeing 737-800 | 2 | 189 | |
| Total | 2 | | |

== Incidents and accidents ==
- On 10 March 2010, Pegasus Airlines Flight 361, an Airbus A319-100 operated by IZair on a ferry flight made an emergency landing at Frankfurt Airport in Germany after a malfunction in the nose gear. The flight landed safely but blew both front nose gear tires. The airport closed runway 07R/25L for 3 hours to allow recovery. Traffic got back to normal about 7 hours later.
