= DBA (airline) =

Low-cost airline of Germany (1992–2008)

Delta Air Regionalflugverkehr GmbH & Co. Deutsche BA Luftfahrtgesellschaft mbH DBA Luftfahrtgesellschaft mbH
| IATA | ICAO | Call sign |
|---|---|---|
| DI (1978–2008) | DEL (1978–1992); BAG (1992–2008) | BODENSEE (1978–1992); SPEEDWAY (1992–2008) |
- Founded: 1978 (as Delta Air); March 1992 (as Deutsche BA)
- Commenced operations: 1 April 1992 (as Deutsche BA); 13 March 2002 (as DBA)
- Ceased operations: 1 April 1992 (as Delta Air); 13 March 2002 (as Deutsche BA); 14 November 2008 (as DBA; merged into Air Berlin)
- Operating bases: Berlin–Tegel; Friedrichshafen; Munich
- Frequent-flyer program: Executive Club; topbonus
- Alliance: Oneworld (affiliate; 1999–2002)
- Parent company: British Airways (1992–2003); Air Berlin (2006–2008)
- Headquarters: Friedrichshafen, Baden-Württemberg; Hallbergmoos, Bavaria

DBA (founded as Delta Air and later Deutsche BA) was a German low-cost airline headquartered on the grounds of Munich Airport in a building within the municipality of Hallbergmoos, Bavaria, Germany. It operated scheduled domestic and international services and also operated charter flights for tour operators in Europe and North Africa.

It was acquired by Air Berlin in August 2006 when operating as dba, but continued to operate independently, marketed as Air Berlin (powered by dba) until being dissolved by its parent company Air Berlin on 30 November 2008.

== History ==
=== Foundation by British Airways ===
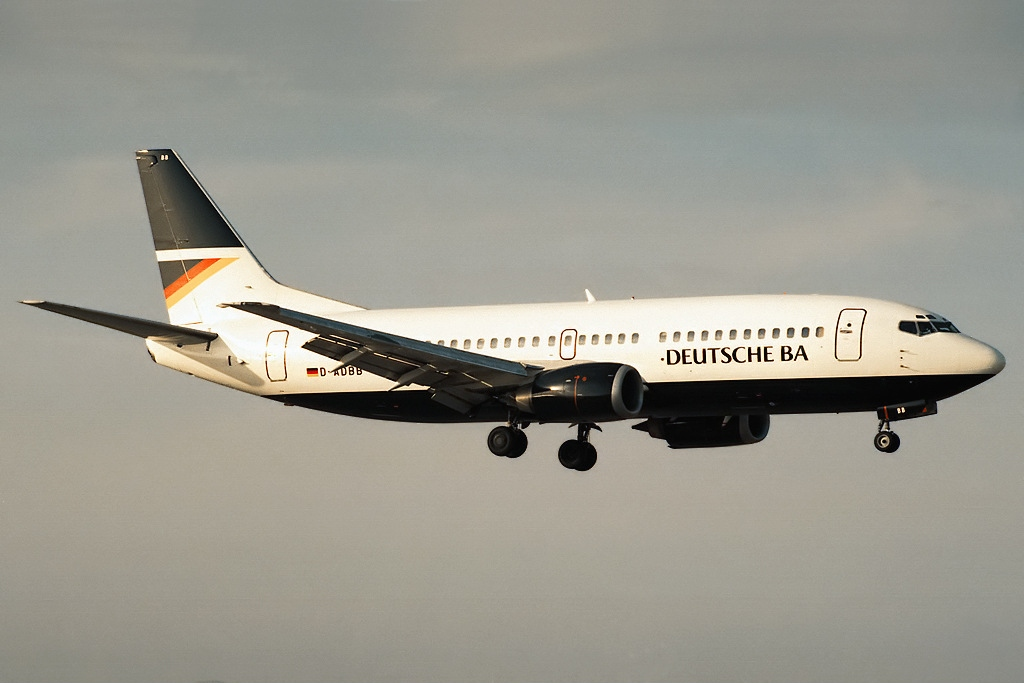
Deutsche BA Boeing 737-300

Deutsche BA was established in 1992, when British Airways (BA) acquired a 49% stake in the Friedrichshafen-based regional airline Delta Air. BA acquired the remaining shares in 1997.

When Carl Michel became CEO, the fleet was streamlined to consist entirely of 18 Boeing 737-300 aircraft, dropping secondary routes including those services operated with Saab 2000 as well as other turboprop aircraft types and focusing on internal German routes, feeder services to London–Gatwick and links to other oneworld partners, notably Iberia and Finnair.

Rod Eddington replaced Bob Ayling as British Airways Chief Executive in May 2000, starting major reviews of the airline's operations. First indications of a BA review of its German arm came in 2001 at which time Deutsche BA had amassed losses of over £15m. On 3 May 2002 EasyJet announced that it intended to pursue a purchase of former BA subsidiary Go. EasyJet followed with an announcement on 8 May 2002 that it had signed an exclusive agreement with British Airways giving it the option to purchase Deutsche BA. EasyJet had until 31 March 2003, or with an extension until 3 July 2003, to purchase the airline. During this time Deutsche BA would remain fully under BA control. However, EasyJet had several commitments: send three managers to the German operation, contribute £3m for capital expenditure and pay BA £366,000 per month until it exercised its option. In March 2003 EasyJet announced it had abandoned its plans to acquire Deutsche BA, citing the economic climate and employment laws in Germany.

=== First sale and planned mergers ===
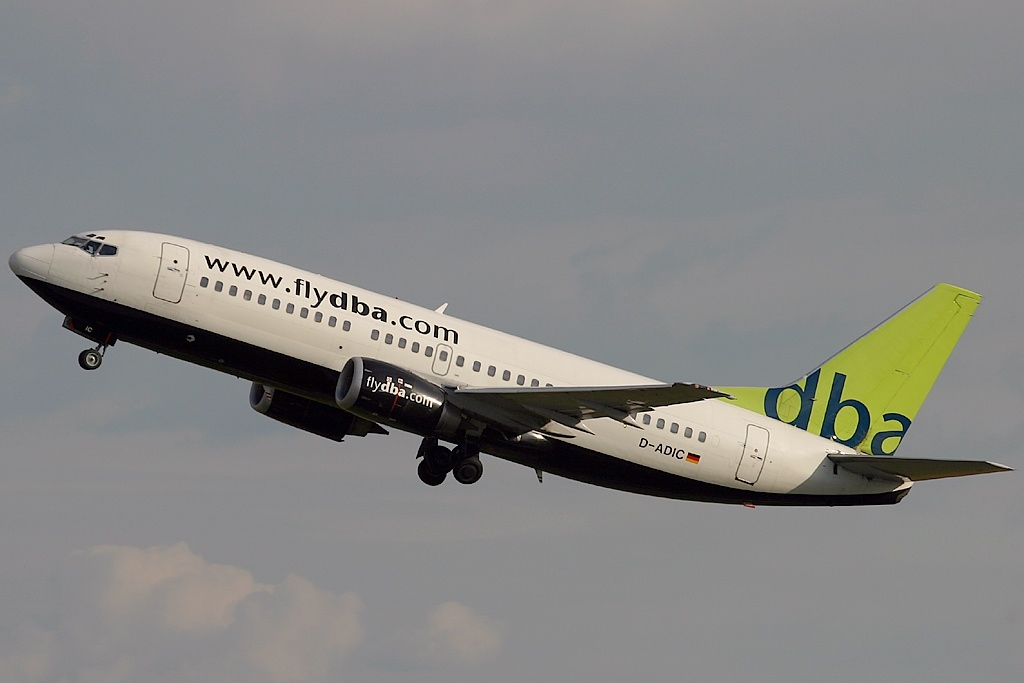
DBA Boeing 737-300

In June 2003, BA announced plans to sell Deutsche BA to Intro Verwaltungsgesellschaft for a token sum of 1 Euro. In addition BA would invest £25m into the airline and guarantee its fleet of 16 Boeing 737s for a year. In return BA would receive 25% of any profits or proceeds from a sale until June 2006. It was rebranded as dba.

In March 2005 dba announced its intention to acquire rival airline Germania Express (gexx) which would create Germany's third largest airline after Lufthansa and Air Berlin. The gexx brand was phased out on the former airline's services, along with its Fokker 100 aircraft which dba has assumed the lease of. dba submitted a binding bid for ailing Greek national airline Olympic Airlines in April 2005, but later withdrew that bid.

In the fiscal year ending 31 March 2005, dba announced its first profit since creation in 1992, of 'between €1m and €2m on sales of around €265m. 3 million passengers flew on dba aircraft in the year ending March 2005. The airline was owned by Intro Verwaltungsgesellschaft (80%) and Martin Gauss and Peter Wojahn (20%), and had 660 employees (at January 2005).

On 17 February 2006, dba announced the purchase of 60% of LTU. Hans-Rudolf Wöhrl, the majority owner of dba, planned to link the operations of LTU and dba, with dba flying inside Germany and LTU serving international destinations. It would allow LTU to increase its longhaul services by providing feeder services to Munich and Düsseldorf. LTU managing director Jürgen Marbach took a 24% stake in the carrier.

=== Sale to Air Berlin ===
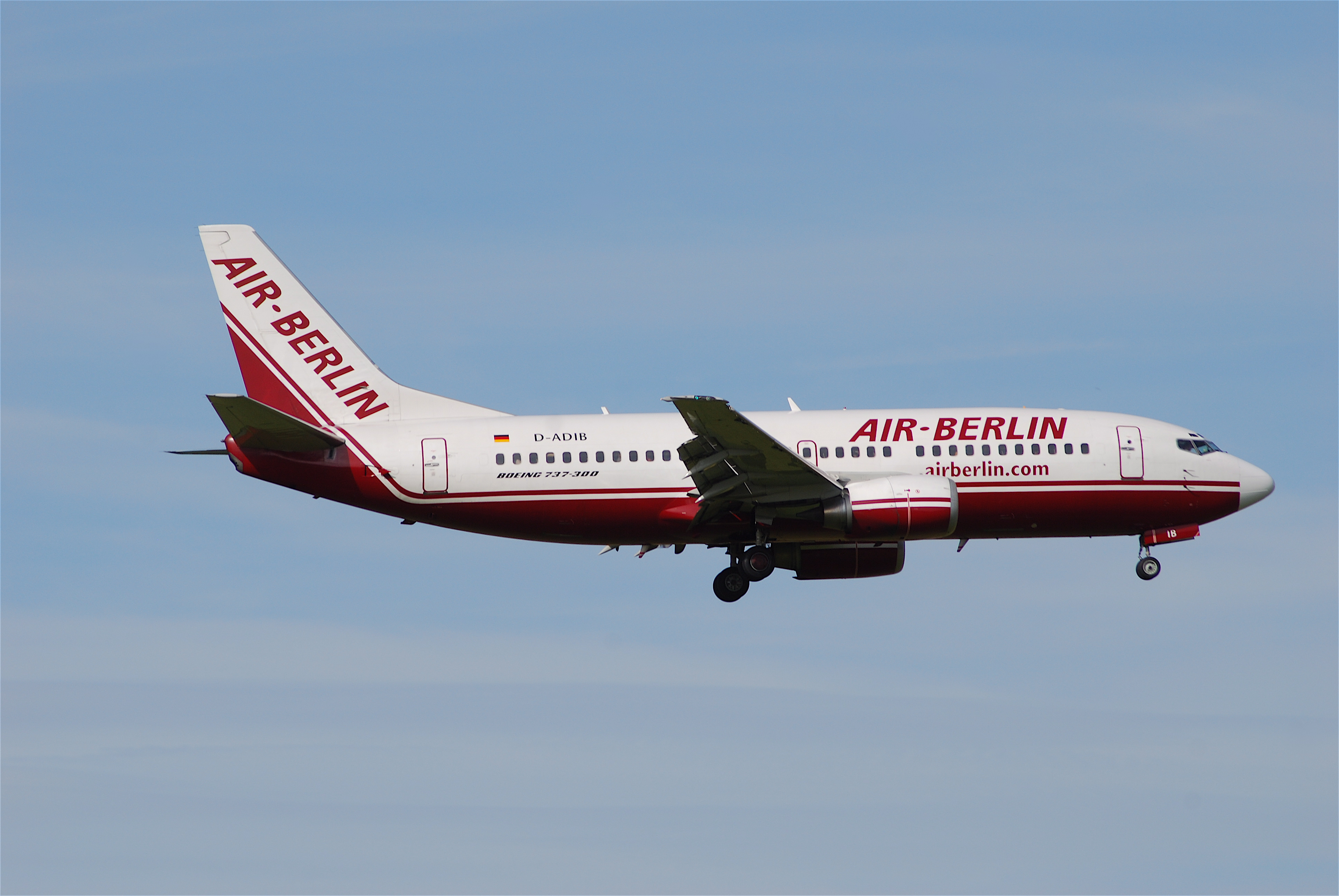
A DBA Boeing 737-300 operated for Air Berlin in 2007.

In February 2006 Lutz Helmig acquired a 25.1% stake in the airline through the Aton company. On August 17, 2006, it was announced that Air Berlin had acquired 100% of the shares in dba. The two airlines would operate under their current identities, with dba continuing to operate as an independent company under the Air Berlin umbrella, but in future would be marketed as Air Berlin ("powered by dba"). It had 700 employees (at March 2007).

On 6 September 2006, the German Federal Cartel Office cleared the acquisition of 100% of the shares of dba by Air Berlin without restrictions to allow finalisation of the takeover. The winter 2006 flight schedules were harmonised and a joint schedule will be in place for the summer 2007 season.

On 30 November 2008 the parent company Air Berlin dissolved the company dba and fully integrated its planes into the Air Berlin fleet.

== Fleet ==
When branded as Deutsche BA, the airline operated the following aircraft types in a livery similar to British Airways:

- Boeing 737-300
- Boeing 737-400
- Dornier 228
- Fokker 100
- Saab 2000
- Saab 340A
