= Stefan Pichler =

German airline executive (born 1957)

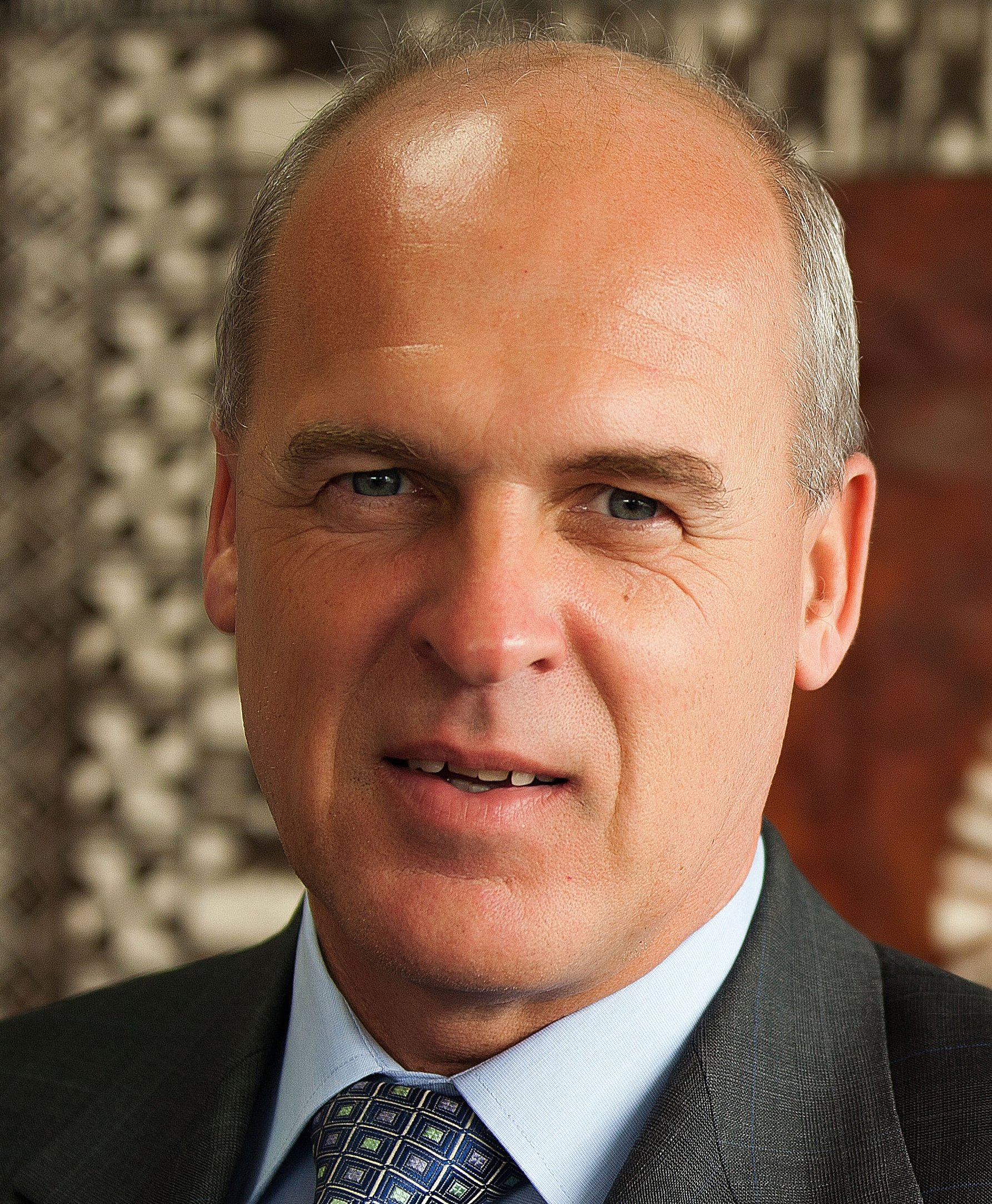
- Born: November 7, 1957 (age 69); Munich, Germany
- Citizenship: Germany
- Education: University of Augsburg
- Occupation: Airline Executive
- Known for: Served as CEO of various airline companies

Stefan Pichler (born November 7, 1957) is a global airline and tourism Chief Executive. Most recently he was President and CEO of Royal Jordanian. Previously, Pichler was the Managing Director and CEO of Air Berlin, served as Managing Director and CEO of Fiji Airways, as the CEO of Jazeera Airways, Chairman and CEO of Thomas Cook AG and Chairman of the Bundesverband der Deutschen Tourismuswirtschaft, as well as Chairman of Fiji Tourism. Additionally, he has held Senior and Executive Board roles as a CCO at Virgin Australia and at Lufthansa.

In November 2014, Air Berlin appointed Pichler as CEO effective February 2015. After signing the restructuring deals with Lufthansa and Etihad, Pichler left to lead Royal Jordanian Airlines. Pichler then developed a turnaround plan for Royal Jordanian which helped to return to profitability by the end of FY 2017. Royal Jordanian also posted a sharp increase in the operating results and net income in 2018 and 2019. Pichler announced his retirement effective 30 September 2020.

== Early life and education ==
Pichler was born and raised in Munich, Germany. He received a master's degree in economics and law from the University of Augsburg and a post graduate degree from INSEAD.

== Career ==
In 1983, Pichler began his career as Head of Sport Promotions for Nike in Beaverton, Oregon. Pichler became the Marketing and Sales Director of France for Lufthansa in 1989. In 1991, Lufthansa appointed Pichler Managing Director for Lufthansa France, based in Paris. He was promoted to Head of Worldwide Sales for Lufthansa in 1996 and appointment as a member of Lufthansa's Executive Board the following year. In January 2000, Pichler was appointed CEO of Thomas Cook AG, a national tour operator. He helped develop the company to the world's second largest leisure group.

Focus ranked Pichler number one on its list of the "Top 30 Tourism Managers" in 2003 for the third consecutive year. The following year he was appointed Chief Commercial Officer and Chairman of Virgin Australia. In 2009, Pichler joined Jazeera Airways as CEO. In 2011, the airline's operating profit margin was the second highest in the global airline industry (25.6%) and in 2012, the margin was 30.2%. He received the "Personal Achievement of the Year Award" at the Aviation Business Awards for making the airline profitable in 2012. In September 2013, Pichler was appointed Managing Director and CEO of Fiji Airways. He was promoted to Chairman of Tourism Fiji in August 2014.

Additionally, Pichler served as a member of the Board of Tourism Australia and held roles at the World Travel and Tourism Council (WTTC) and the Tourism Working Group of the World Economic Forum. He has also held non-executive director of major German corporations including Deutsche Bank and Steigenberger Hotels.

In November 2014, Air Berlin appointed Pichler CEO effective February 2015. With the support of Etihad Airways, Pichler developed a strategic restructuring plan which resulted in dividing the company into 3 separate business units: the first unit was to provide 40 aircraft to Lufthansa Group per wet lease agreement. the second unit, the touristic business including the Austrian daughter company Niki, was sold to Etihad Airways who invested this stake into a joint venture with TUI Group. And the third unit, New Airberlin, was redesigned to become a network carrier serving the hubs in Duesseldorf and Berlin. All those deals were concluded in December 2016 were designed to enable a new start for airberlin which had lost over 3 billion Euros in the last 10 years.

Also in December 2016, he announced his resignation as CEO of Air Berlin effective January 31, 2017 and left to lead Royal Jordanian into a turnaround.

== Personal life ==
Pichler is a former internationally ranked marathon runner and ran for the German national team.
