= Lufthansa =

German airline group

Lufthansa German Airlines

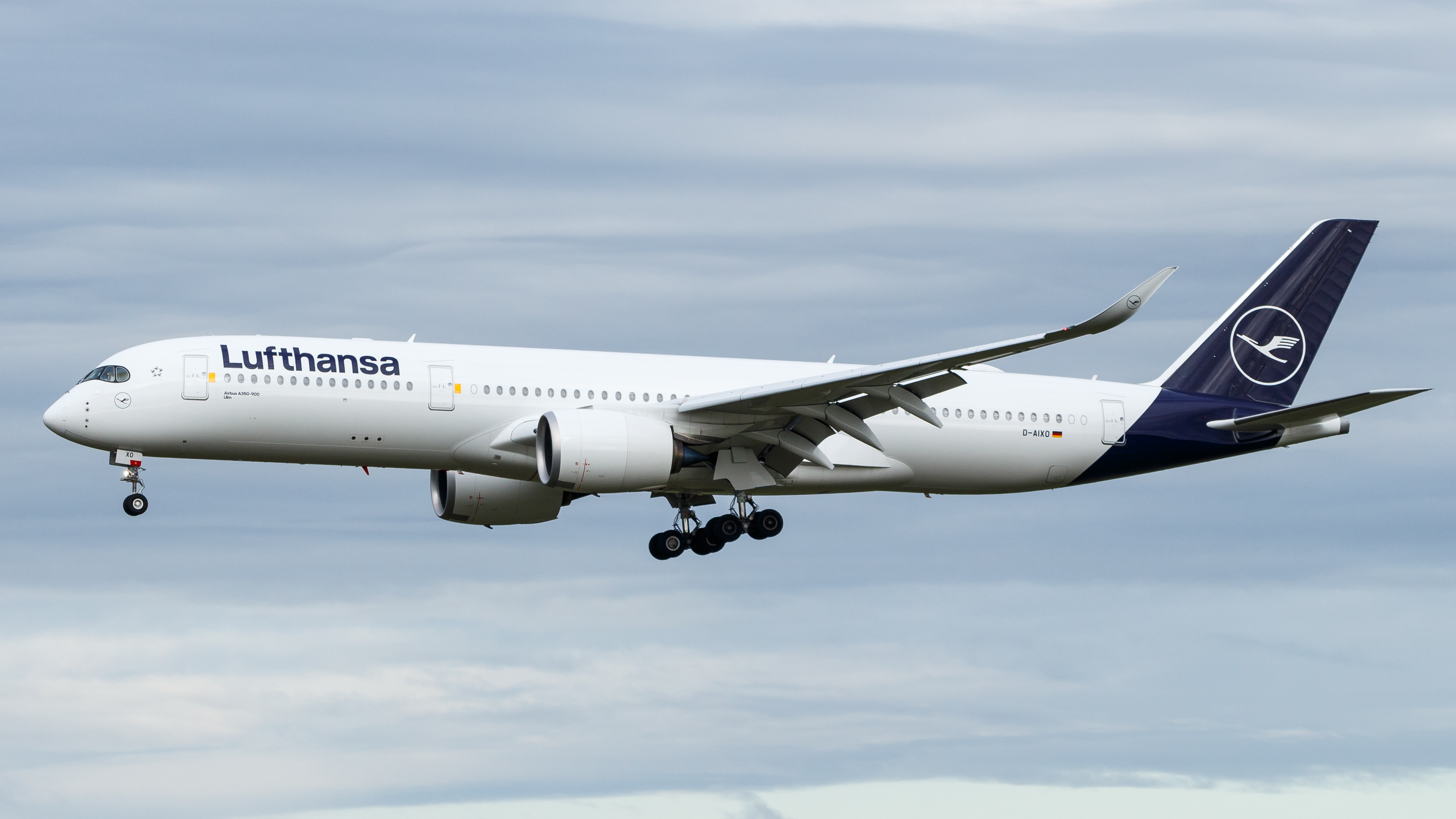
- A Lufthansa Airbus A350-900
| IATA | ICAO | Call sign |
|---|---|---|
| LH | DLH | LUFTHANSA |
- Founded: 1953; 73 years ago 6 January 1926; 100 years ago (as Deutsche Luft Hansa)
- Commenced operations: 1955; 71 years ago 6 April 1926; 100 years ago (as Deutsche Luft Hansa)
- Hubs: Frankfurt; Munich
- Frequent-flyer program: Miles & More
- Alliance: Star Alliance
- Fleet size: 274
- Destinations: 229
- Parent company: Lufthansa Group
- Headquarters: Cologne, North Rhine-Westphalia, Germany
- Key people: Jens Ritter (CEO); Heiko Reitz (CCO); Jörg Beißel (CFO); Karl Brandes (COO); Astrid Neben (CHRO)
- Revenue: ▲€35.44B (2023)
- Operating income: ▲€2.68B (2023)
- Net income: ▲€1.67B (2023)
- Total assets: ▲€45.32B (2023)
- Total equity: ▲€9.70B (2023)
- Employees: ▲96,677 (2023)
- Website: lufthansa.com

Deutsche Lufthansa AG (German: [ˌdɔʏtʃə ˈlʊfthanzaː ʔaːˈɡeː]), trading as Lufthansa Group, is a German aviation holding company. Its principal airline, Lufthansa German Airlines (branded as Lufthansa) is the flag carrier of Germany. (Note: Sources:) Lufthansa Group is the second-largest airline group in Europe by passengers carried, as well as largest in Europe and fourth largest in the world by revenue. Lufthansa Airlines is also one of the five founding members of Star Alliance, the world's largest airline alliance, established in 1997.

Lufthansa Group owns several other airlines, including Austrian Airlines, Brussels Airlines, Discover Airlines, Eurowings, ITA Airways, and Swiss International Air Lines. The group also owns several aviation-related companies, including Global Load Control, Lufthansa Consulting, Lufthansa Flight Training, Lufthansa Systems and Lufthansa Technik.

The modern Deutsche Lufthansa AG was founded as Aktiengesellschaft für Luftverkehrsbedarf (Luftag) on 6 January 1953 by staff of the former Deutsche Luft Hansa, Germany's national airline founded in 1926. While Deutsche Luft Hansa played a significant role in the development of commercial aviation in Germany, it was liquidated in 1951 due to its association with the Nazi regime during World War II. Luftag adopted the branding of the former flag carrier by acquiring the Luft Hansa name and logo in 1954.

The corporate headquarters of Deutsche Lufthansa AG are in Cologne, Lufthansa's main operations base, the Lufthansa Aviation Center, is located at Frankfurt Airport, the airline's primary hub. The airline also maintains a secondary hub at Munich Airport, along with its Flight Operations Centre.

== History ==
=== 1950s: Post-war (re-)formation ===
Revenue passenger-kilometers, scheduled flights only, in millions
| Year | Traffic |
|---|---|
| 1955 | 78 |
| 1960 | 1,284 |
| 1965 | 3,785 |
| 1969 | 6,922 |
| 1971 | 8,610 |
| 1975 | 13,634 |
| 1980 | 21,056 |
| 1989 | 36,133 |
| 1995 | 61,602 |
| 2000 | 94,170 |

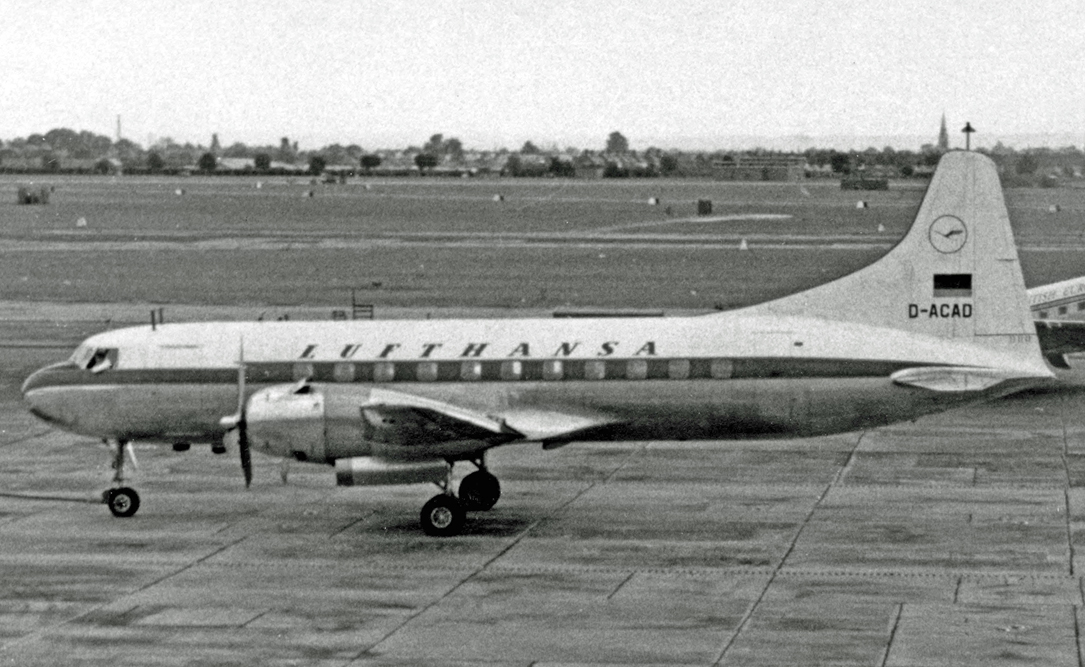
Lufthansa's first aircraft, a Convair 340 (type pictured), was delivered in August 1954.

Lufthansa traces its history to 1926 when Deutsche Luft Hansa was formed in Berlin by the merger of Deutscher Aero Lloyd, the world's sixth-oldest airline, and Junkers Luftverkehr. Deutsche Luft Hansa was Germany's flag carrier until the outbreak of war when it came under the command of the Luftwaffe. During the war, the airline was focused mainly on aircraft maintenance and repair in which forced labour was employed on the site of Berlin Tempelhof Airport. Following the surrender of Germany and the ensuing Allied occupation of Germany, all aircraft in the country were seized and Deutsche Luft Hansa was dissolved. The remaining assets were liquidated on 1 January 1951.

In an effort to create a new national airline, a company called Aktiengesellschaft für Luftverkehrsbedarf (Luftag) was founded in the city of Cologne in West Germany on 6 January 1953, with many of its staff having worked for the pre-war Deutsche Luft Hansa.

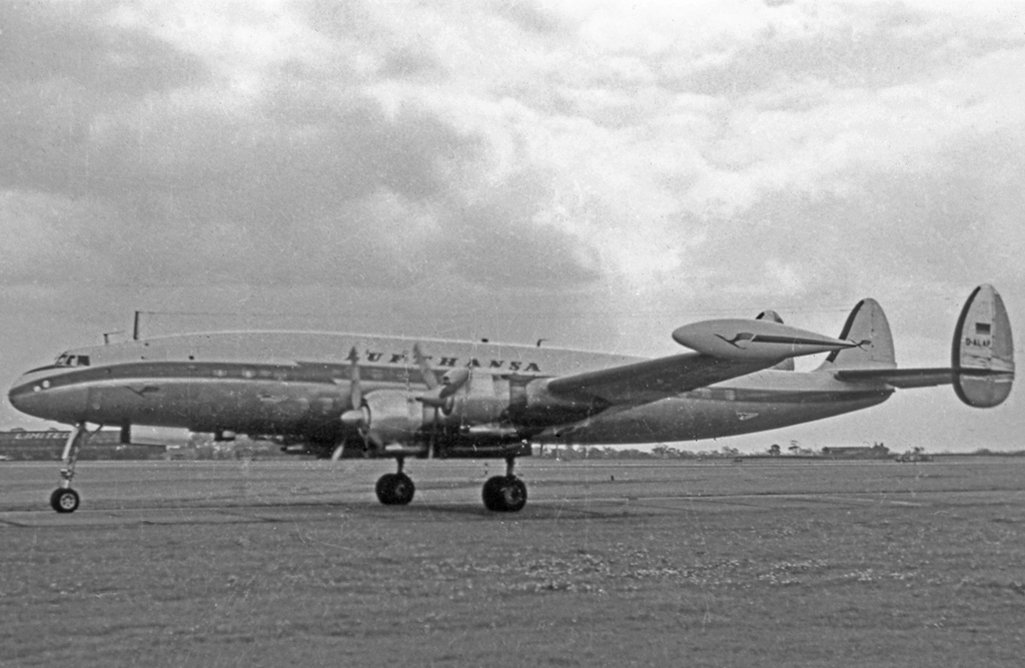
Lufthansa Lockheed L-1049 Super Constellation operating a transatlantic scheduled service from Hamburg to Montreal and Chicago in 1956

West Germany had not yet been granted full sovereignty over its airspace, so it was not known when the new airline could become operational. Nevertheless, in 1953, Luftag placed orders for four Convair CV-340 and four Lockheed L-1049 Super Constellations aircraft and set up a maintenance base at Hamburg Airport. On 6 August 1954, Luftag acquired the name and logo of the liquidated Deutsche Lufthansa for DM 30,000 (equivalent to €41,000 today), thus continuing the tradition of a German flag carrier with that name.

On 1 April 1955, Lufthansa won approval to commence operation of scheduled domestic flights. The airline's initial network linked Hamburg, Düsseldorf, Frankfurt, Cologne, and Munich. International flights started on 15 May 1955, to London, Paris, and Madrid, followed by Super Constellation flights to New York City from 1 June of that year, and across the South Atlantic from August 1956.

However, the political realities of the time presented challenges for the airline. The United States, Soviet Union, Britain and France did not allow Lufthansa to fly to any part of the divided Berlin during the division of Germany. The airline had hoped this would only be a temporary matter and planned to move its headquarters and primary hub back to the German capital once the political situation changed, plans that ultimately never came to fruition, even after the lifting of these restrictions owing to German reunification in 1990 and the opening of the new Berlin-Brandenburg Airport in 2020. Instead, Lufthansa turned Frankfurt Airport into its primary hub in 1958.

The airline also embarked on a marketing campaign to encourage travelers to consider visiting West Germany as it rebuilt in the wake of World War II and to use its hub to connect to other locations across Europe. By 1963, the airline, initially limited in its public relations efforts, had become a major purveyor of West Germany's image abroad.

During this time, East Germany attempted to establish its own "Lufthansa" airline in 1955, but legal challenges from the West German carrier led to its abandonment. East Germany subsequently launched Interflug as its national carrier in 1963.

=== 1960s: Introduction of jetliners ===
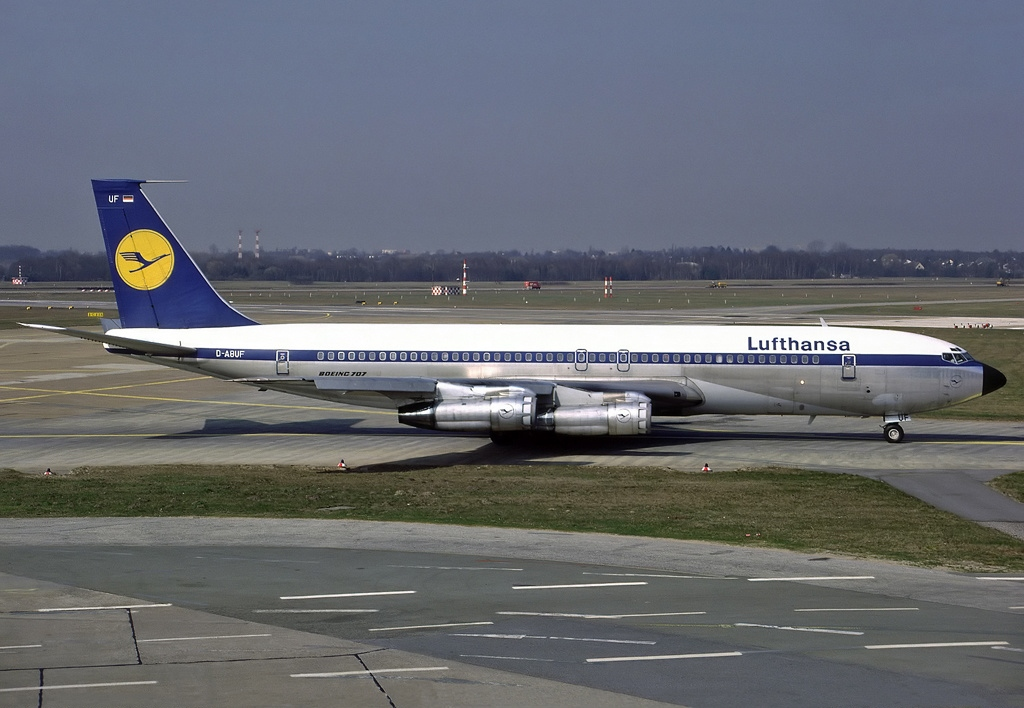
A Boeing 707 at Hamburg Airport in 1984, shortly before the type was retired

Lufthansa embraced the jet age in 1958 by ordering four Boeing 707 aircraft. This marked a significant leap forward, allowing them to launch jet flights between Frankfurt and New York City in March 1960. To further bolster their jet fleet, Boeing 720B aircraft (a 707 derivative for shorter flights from shorter runways) were later acquired.

Lufthansa's network continued to expand throughout the early 1960s. In February 1961, their Far East routes extended beyond Bangkok to include Hong Kong and Tokyo. Africa saw additions in 1962 with Lagos, Nigeria, and Johannesburg, South Africa joining the network.

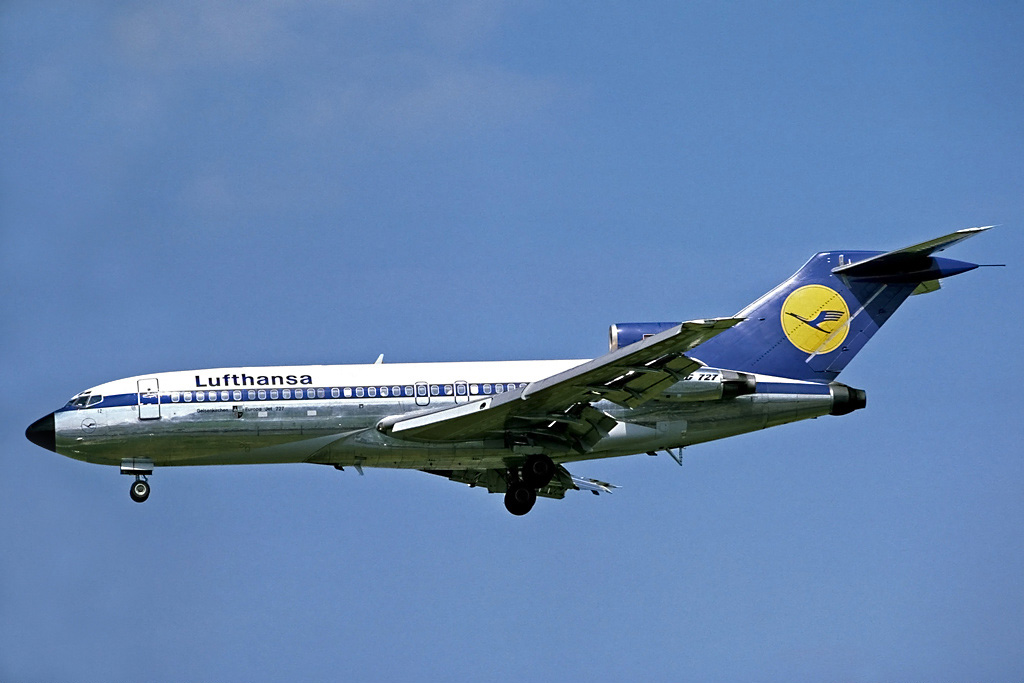
Lufthansa Boeing 727-100, 1978

Innovation continued with the introduction of the Boeing 727 in 1964. This enabled Lufthansa to launch a pioneering Polar route from Frankfurt to Tokyo via Anchorage in May of that year. Further expansion plans were solidified in February 1965 with the order of twenty-one Boeing 737 aircraft, entering service in 1968.

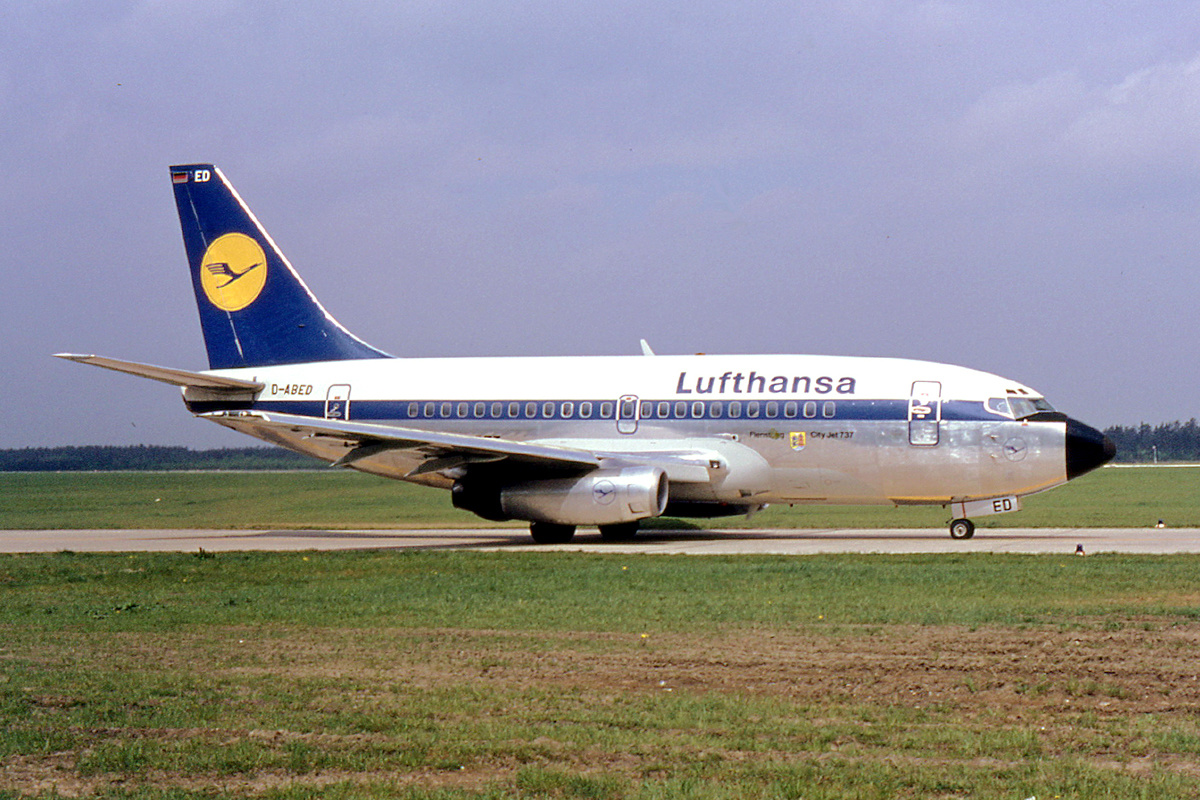
Lufthansa was the launch customer of the Boeing 737. The image shows an original 737-100 at Hannover Airport in 1968.

Lufthansa's role in Boeing's history is noteworthy. They hold the distinction of being the first customers for the Boeing 737 and one of only four buyers of the initial 737-100 model (alongside NASA, Malaysia-Singapore Airlines, and Avianca). While NASA technically had the first built 737 airframe, it was ultimately delivered last and originally intended for Lufthansa, making them the first foreign launch customer for a Boeing airliner.

=== 1970s–1980s: The wide-body era ===
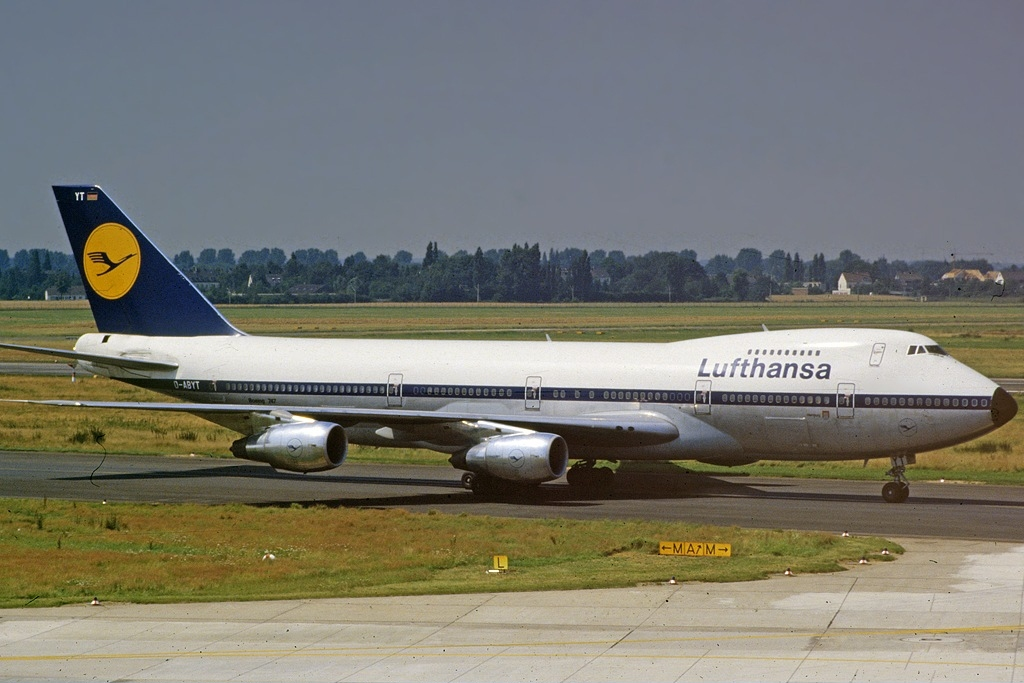
Lufthansa became the first European airline to introduce the Boeing 747 on regular passenger services in 1970. Seen here is a 747-200 at Düsseldorf Airport in 1985.

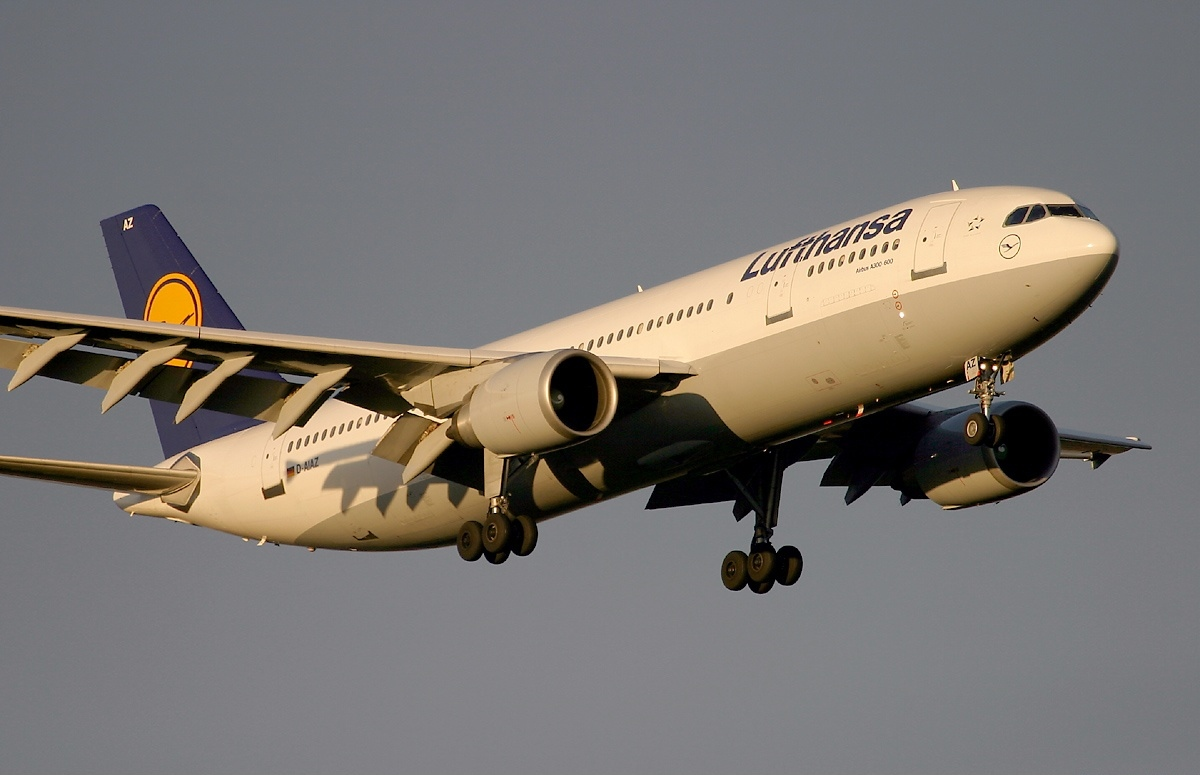
Lufthansa operated the high-capacity Airbus A300-600 on domestic and European routes until 2009

The wide-body era for Lufthansa started with a Boeing 747 flight on 26 April 1970. It was followed by the introduction of the DC-10-30 on 14 January 1974, and the first Airbus A300 in 1976. In 1979, Lufthansa and Swissair became launch customers for the Airbus A310 with an order for 25 aircraft.

The company's fleet modernisation programme for the 1990s began on 29 June 1985, with an order for fifteen Airbus A320s and seven Airbus A300-600s. Ten Boeing 737-300s were ordered a few days later. All were delivered between 1987 and 1992. Lufthansa also bought Airbus A321, Airbus A340, and Boeing 747-400 aircraft.

In 1987, Lufthansa, together with Air France, Iberia, and Scandinavian Airlines, founded Amadeus, an IT company (also known as a GDS) that would enable travel agencies to sell the founders and other airlines' products from a single system.

=== 1990s–2000s: Further expansion ===
Following German reunification on 3 October 1990, Lufthansa swiftly reintegrated Berlin into its network, marking the city's return as a key destination within 25 days.

The mid-1990s saw a period of strategic restructuring for Lufthansa. This involved the establishment of independent operating companies within Lufthansa Group, specializing in areas like maintenance (Lufthansa Technik), cargo (Lufthansa Cargo), and information technology (Lufthansa Systems). Over time, the group further expanded through the addition of LSG Sky Chefs (catering), Condor (leisure travel), and Lufthansa CityLine (regional operations).

Lufthansa joined Air Canada, Scandinavian Airlines, Thai Airways International, and United Airlines to form Star Alliance on 14 May 1997, the world's first multilateral airline alliance.

Lufthansa actively addressed its historical legacy during this period. In 1999, the airline participated in a German initiative aimed at resolving wartime misdeeds, acknowledging the use of forced labor by its predecessor, Deutsche Luft Hansa. As part of the initiative, Lufthansa also reportedly paid tens of millions of German marks. Additionally, a historical study was commissioned to shed light on this aspect of the company's past. However, Lufthansa was criticised for not publishing the resulting study for more than a decade.

The early 2000s witnessed Lufthansa demonstrate remarkable resilience in the face of industry challenges. Despite significant industry losses following the 11 September attacks, the airline maintained profitability and strategically avoided workforce reductions. Lufthansa became the launch customer for the Connexion by Boeing in-flight internet connectivity in 2004.

Lufthansa further solidified its position as a major European airline group through strategic acquisitions. The acquisitions of Swiss International Air Lines in 2005, Brussels Airlines (staged between 2009 and 2017), and Austrian Airlines in 2009 expanded the group's reach and network capabilities.

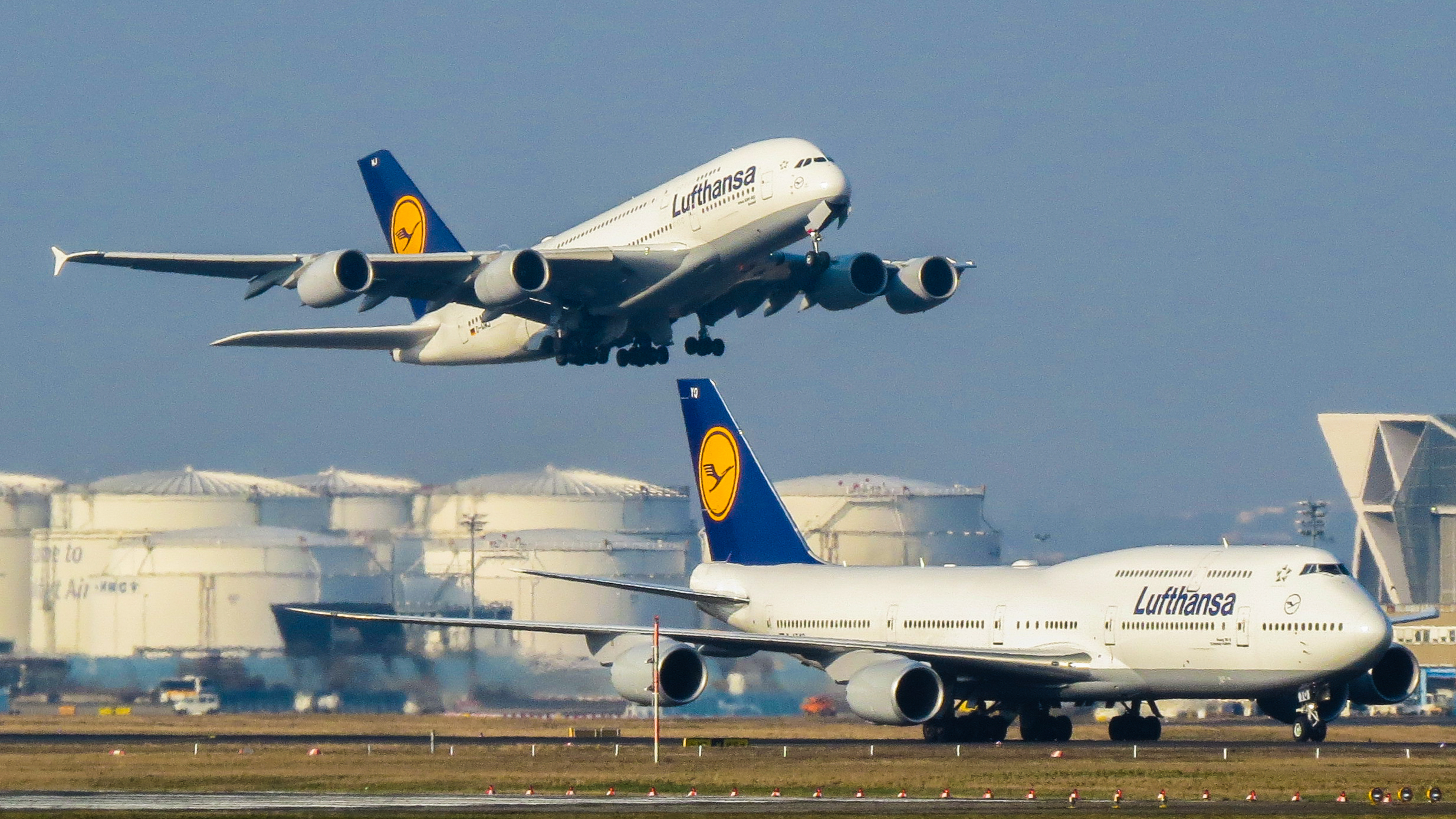
A Boeing 747-8I and Airbus A380-800 of Lufthansa at Frankfurt Airport. The A380 and 747-8, together with the Airbus A350, formed the backbone for Lufthansa's long-haul routes in the 2010s.

At the end of the 2000s, Lufthansa made a large commitment to very large aircraft, introducing the first of 14 Airbus A380 in 2010 and becoming the launch customer for the Boeing 747-8I in 2012, eventually purchasing 19 of the type.

=== 2010s: Losses and strikes ===
In 2011 Lufthansa planned significant growth at Berlin Brandenburg Airport for the originally planned opening in 2012 with many new connections from Berlin.

After a loss of 298 million euros in the first quarter of 2010 and another 13 million loss in the year 2011 due to the economic recession and restructuring costs, Deutsche Lufthansa AG cut 3,500 administrative positions or around 20 percent of the clerical total of 16,800 in 2012. Lufthansa announced a restructuring program called SCORE to improve its operating profit. As a part of the restructuring plan, the company started to transfer all short-haul flights outside its hubs in Frankfurt, Munich, and Düsseldorf to the company's re-branded low-cost carrier Germanwings.

In September 2013, Lufthansa Group announced its biggest order, for 59 wide-body aircraft valued at more than 14 billion euros at list prices. Earlier in the same year, Lufthansa placed an order for 100 next-generation narrow-body aircraft.

The group has had a long-standing dispute with the Vereinigung Cockpit union, which has advocated for a system in which pilots can retire at the age of 55, and 60% of their pay be retained. Lufthansa pilots were joined by pilots from the group's budget carrier Germanwings to stage a nationwide strike in support of their demands in April 2014 which lasted three days. The pilots staged a six-hour strike at the end of the summer holidays in September 2014, which caused the cancellation of 200 Lufthansa flights and 100 Germanwings flights.

During the course of the 2014 FIFA World Cup, part of the fleet was branded "Fanhansa".

In November 2014, Lufthansa signed an outsourcing deal worth $1.25 billion with IBM that will see the US company take over the airline's IT infrastructure services division and staff.

Carsten Spohr, Lufthansa's CEO, called the March 2015 Germanwings Flight 9525 crash, "the darkest day for Lufthansa in its 60-year history", when co-pilot Andreas Lubitz intentionally flew an aircraft into a mountain, killing himself, 144 passengers and 5 crew members. Nonetheless, damage control by Spohr and his team was poor according to several sources. It was revealed that Lubitz suffered from a severe case of depression and mental disorders and had intentionally crashed Germanwings Flight 9525 into the French Alps, killing all 150 aboard whereas Spohr had misleadingly said the co-pilot "was 100% airworthy without any restrictions, without any conditions".

In June 2015, Lufthansa announced plans to close its small long-haul base at Düsseldorf Airport for economic reasons by October 2015. At the time, the base consisted of two Airbus A340-300s rotating between Newark and Chicago. As a result, service to Chicago from Düsseldorf was first made seasonal, suspended for the winter 2015 season, and then canceled altogether. Service to Newark, however, was initially maintained. From the winter 2015 schedule through the end of the winter 2016 schedule, Düsseldorf was served by aircraft which also flew the Munich-Newark route. The Düsseldorf-Newark route ended on 30 November 2018, which was operated with an Airbus A330-300 aircraft. Their base was officially closed in March 2019.

On 22 March 2016, Lufthansa ended Boeing 737-500 operations. The airline's last Boeing 737 (a 737-300) was retired on 29 October 2016, after a flight from Milan to Frankfurt. Lufthansa operated the 737 in several variants for almost 50 years, the first aircraft having been delivered on 27 December 1967.

On 1 September 2015, Lufthansa implemented a 16 euro surcharge on Global Distribution System bookings. The surcharge is payable unless tickets are purchased from the airline's website, or its airport service centres and ticket counters. Amadeus said the new model would make "comparison and transparency more difficult because travellers will now be forced to go to multiple channels to search for the best fares." For the period between 1–14 September, the airline experienced a 16.1% drop in revenue, indicating to some that the new fee backfired, although the airline maintains that the decrease was due to the pilot strike, and "other seasonal effects".

In October 2017, Lufthansa took over 81 aircraft from the insolvent Air Berlin. The total purchase price for the shares acquired by Lufthansa from the insolvency estate of Air Berlin amounted to around 210 million euros.

On 4 December 2017, Lufthansa became the first European airline to receive the Skytrax 5-star certification. As stated by Skytrax, a key factor in the positive rating was the announcement of a new Business Class cabin and seating that was expected to be introduced in 2020. While this makes Lufthansa the 10th airline to be holding this award, in reality the 5th star was given to a product that was supposed to be introduced two years after the evaluation. In celebration, Lufthansa painted an Airbus A320 and a Boeing 747-8 in the "5 Starhansa" livery.

In March 2018, Lufthansa and other airlines like British Airways and American Airlines accepted a request from Beijing to list Taiwan as part of China.

In March 2019, Lufthansa ordered 20 Boeing 787-9 and an additional 20 Airbus A350-900 for its own and the group's fleet replacement and expansion. Also, the airline announced it would sell six A380 aircraft back to Airbus, beginning in 2022.

Pro-migration activists from Germany have criticised Lufthansa for performing deportation flights on behalf of the German government. In 2019, 4,573 people were deported on their planes, while their subsidiary Eurowings performed 1,312 deportations. This totals more than 25% of deportations in Germany in 2019. At least two deportees perished during transport.

=== 2020s: COVID-19 pandemic and recovery ===
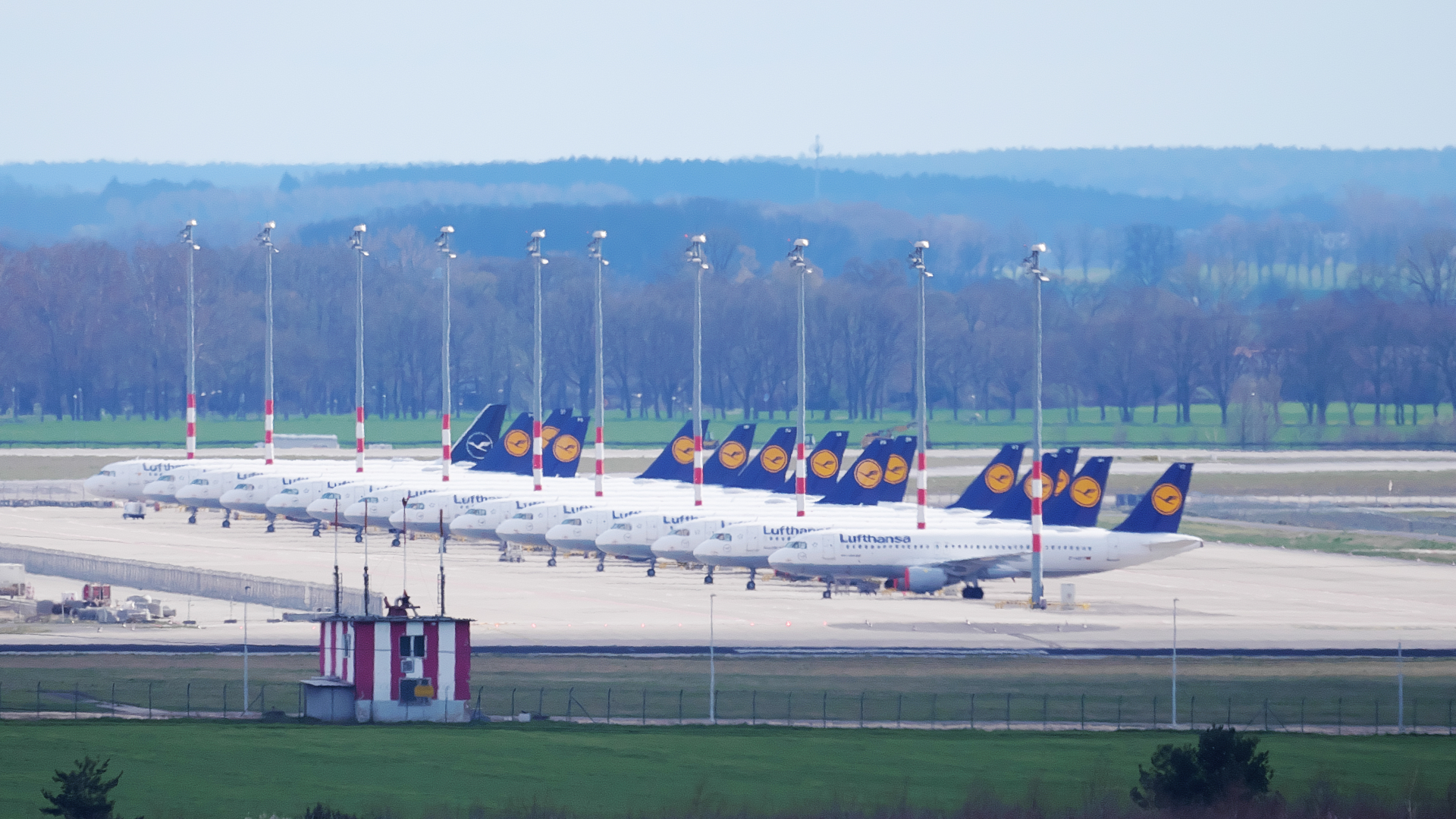
15 aircraft of Lufthansa, parked at Berlin Brandenburg Airport on 21 March 2020 due to the cancellation of 95 percent of all flights of the airline on 19 March 2020

On 19 March 2020, Lufthansa cancelled 95 percent of all flights due to a travel ban because of the COVID-19 pandemic.

On 14 May, Lufthansa Group announced that it planned to operate 1,800 weekly flights by the end of June. The company's recovery plans involved high-density cargo to replace paying customers. All Lufthansa Group required all passengers to wear a mask while aboard.

On 25 June, Deutsche Lufthansa AG shareholders accepted a €9,000,000,000 bailout, consisting of capital measures and the participation of the Economic Stabilisation Fund (WSF) of the Federal Ministry for Economic Affairs and Energy. The measures, which passed after initial opposition by principal shareholder Heinz Hermann Thiele, gave the government a 20% stake in the airline.

In January 2021, Lufthansa CEO Spohr announced that the entire currently stored Airbus A340-600 fleet will be retired with immediate effect and not return to service anymore. This decision was later overturned, with several A340-600 aircraft returning to service in 2021 after several months in storage. In June 2021, Lufthansa said it wants to repay state aid it received during the pandemic before Germany's federal election in September 2021 if possible. Also in June 2021, Lufthansa said it would change its communications to adopt a more gender-neutral and inclusive language. It will remove greetings such as "Ladies and Gentlemen".

In January 2022, Lufthansa admitted it had operated over 18,000 empty flights to keep airport slots during the pandemic.

In March 2022, Lufthansa originally confirmed that its entire Airbus A380 fleet would be retired, having been in storage since early 2020. This decision was reversed in June 2022, with plans to now return up to five aircraft from storage by 2023 to be based at Munich Airport. There is also an option to return all eight remaining A380 aircraft to service by 2024, as six of the formerly 14 have already been sold.

In May 2022, Skytrax demoted Lufthansa from its aforementioned 5-star rating which it held since 2017 as the first European carrier to do so, to an overall 4-star rating.

In 2023, the airline was affected by an IT glitch, leaving thousands of passengers stranded around the world. According to the German air traffic control agency, the airline's flights were redirected from Frankfurt to other airports due to an IT glitch. The issue was reportedly caused after construction work cut through fiber optic cables in the city.

In May 2023, Lufthansa Group announced an agreement with the Italian Ministry of Economy and Finance (MEF) to acquire a 41 per cent stake in ITA Airways. Part of the agreement allows Lufthansa to acquire the remaining shares at a later date. In May 2024, Lufthansa rolled out a new safety video in line with the Allegris launch.

In 2025, some of Lufthansa's Boeing 747 would be refitted with its Business Class seats, being split into half, of which the first half included new luxurious seats, while the other half would still have the original first class seats. In September Lufthansa announced plans to cut 4000 of its 10,000 administrative jobs despite 1.4 billion Euro revenue in 2024.

On 23 April 2026, Lufthansa announced it would withdraw 27 aircraft from its CityLine fleet. This decision was made to help the company save money because of high fuel costs and labour issues.

In May 2026, Lufthansa announced it was exercising its option to buy another 49% of ITA and expected the transaction to be complete in early 2027, taking its ownership stake to 90%. Lufthansa holds an option to buy the last 10% in 2028.

On 14 October 2026, the Government of Portugal announced it had accepted a bid by Lufthansa to buy a 44.9% stake in TAP Air Portugal for €1.2 billion.

== Corporate affairs ==
Deutsche Lufthansa AG
- Trade name: Lufthansa Group
- Type: Public
- Traded as: FWB: LHA
- Industry: freight air transport passenger air transport
- Predecessor: Deutscher Aero-Lloyd; Luftverkehrs-AG Niedersachsen; Luftverkehrsgesellschaft Ruhrgebiet; Junkers
- Founded: 6 January 1953; 73 years ago
- Key people: Carsten Spohr (CEO); Michael Niggemann; Till Streichert (CFO); Grazia Vittadini; Dieter Vranckx
- Revenue: 37,581,000,000 euro (2024)
- Operating income: 1,542,000,000 euro (2024)
- Net income: 1,380,000,000 euro (2024)
- Total assets: 47,052,000,000 euro (2024)
- Number of employees: 100,290 (2024)
- Subsidiaries: Airlines: Air Dolomiti; Austrian Airlines; Brussels Airlines; Discover Airlines; Eurowings/Eurowings Europe; ITA Airways (41%); Lufthansa; Lufthansa Cargo; Lufthansa City Airlines; Sun Express (50%); Swiss International Air Lines; Non-airlines: Global Load Control; Lufthansa Consulting; Lufthansa Aviation Training; Lufthansa Industry Solutions; Lufthansa Systems; Lufthansa Group Digital Hangar; Lufthansa Technik
- Website: lufthansagroup.com

Lufthansa Group consists of the three segments Passenger Airlines, Logistics, and MRO, as well as Additional Businesses and Group Functions.

=== Passenger airlines ===
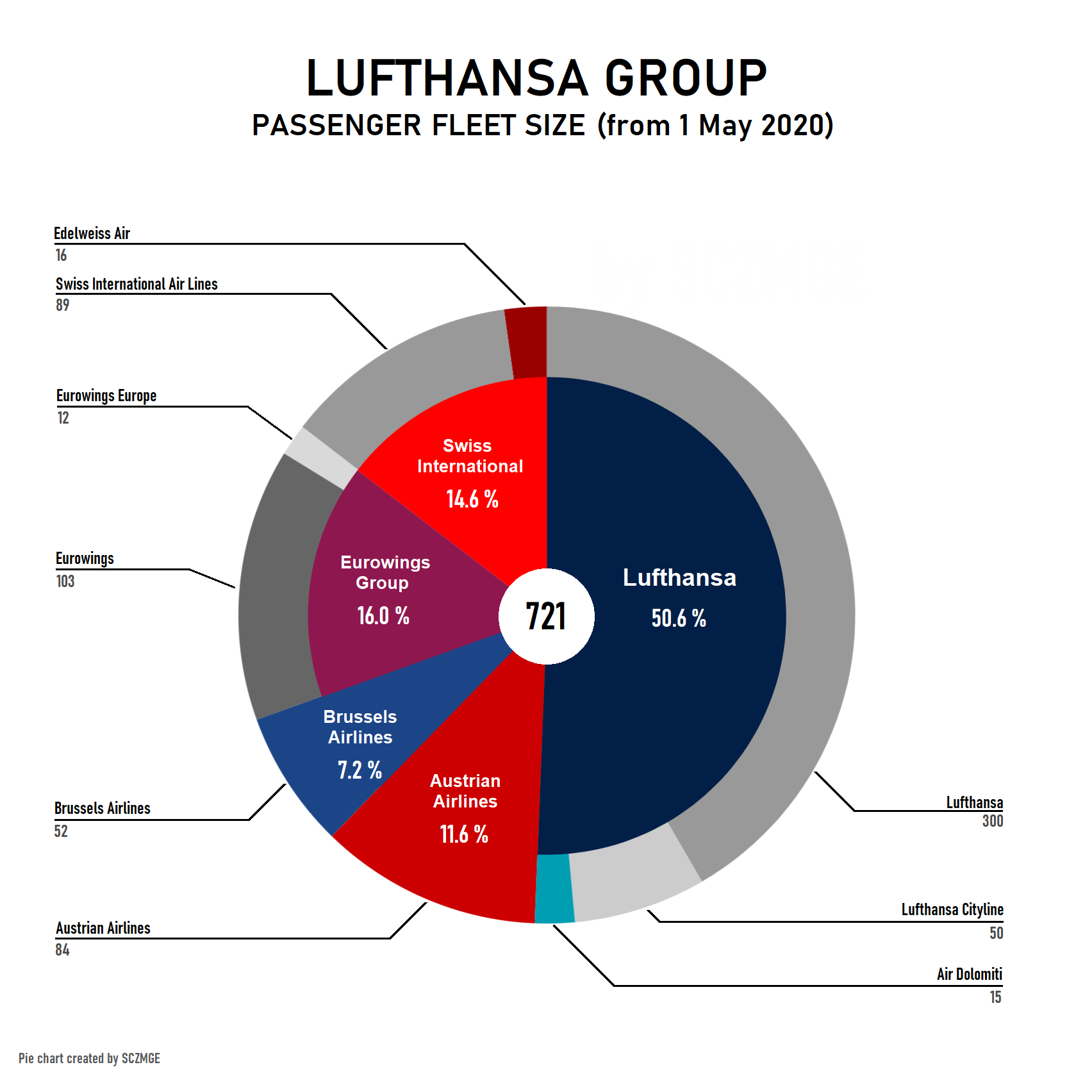
Lufthansa Group passenger fleet size, including subsidiaries and excluding cargo (wholly owned)

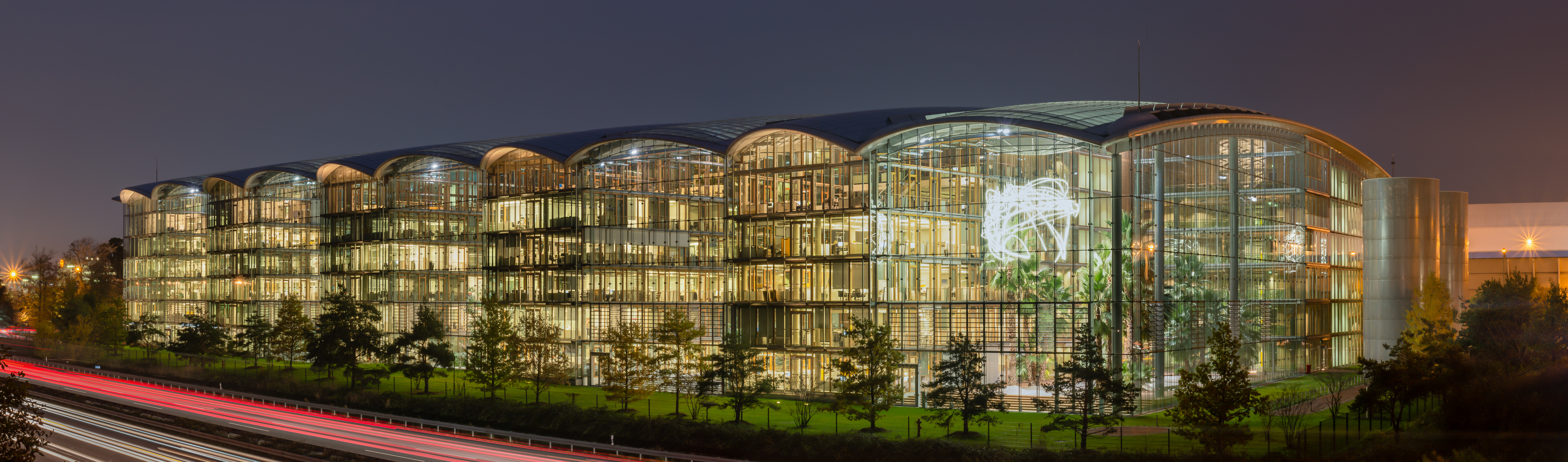
The Lufthansa Aviation Center at Frankfurt Airport by architect Christoph Ingenhoven

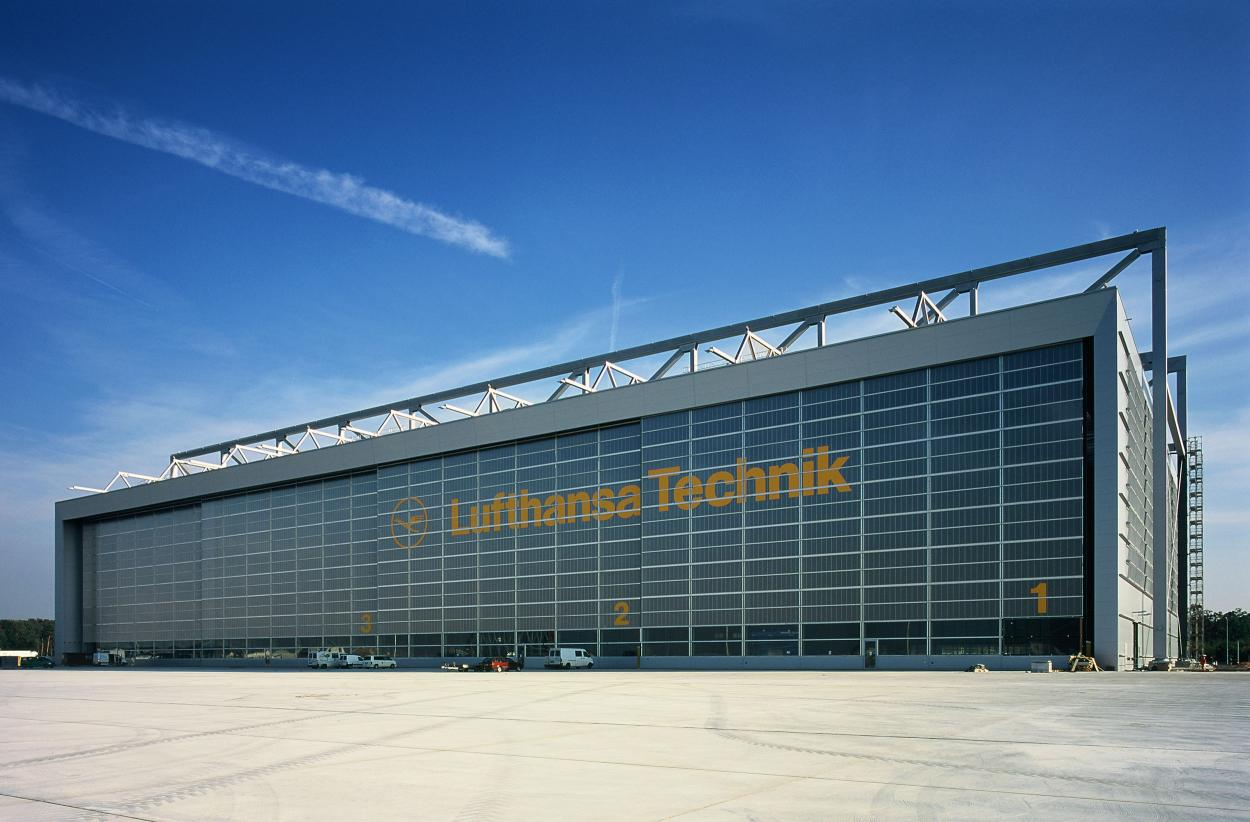
The hangar of Lufthansa Technik at Frankfurt Airport

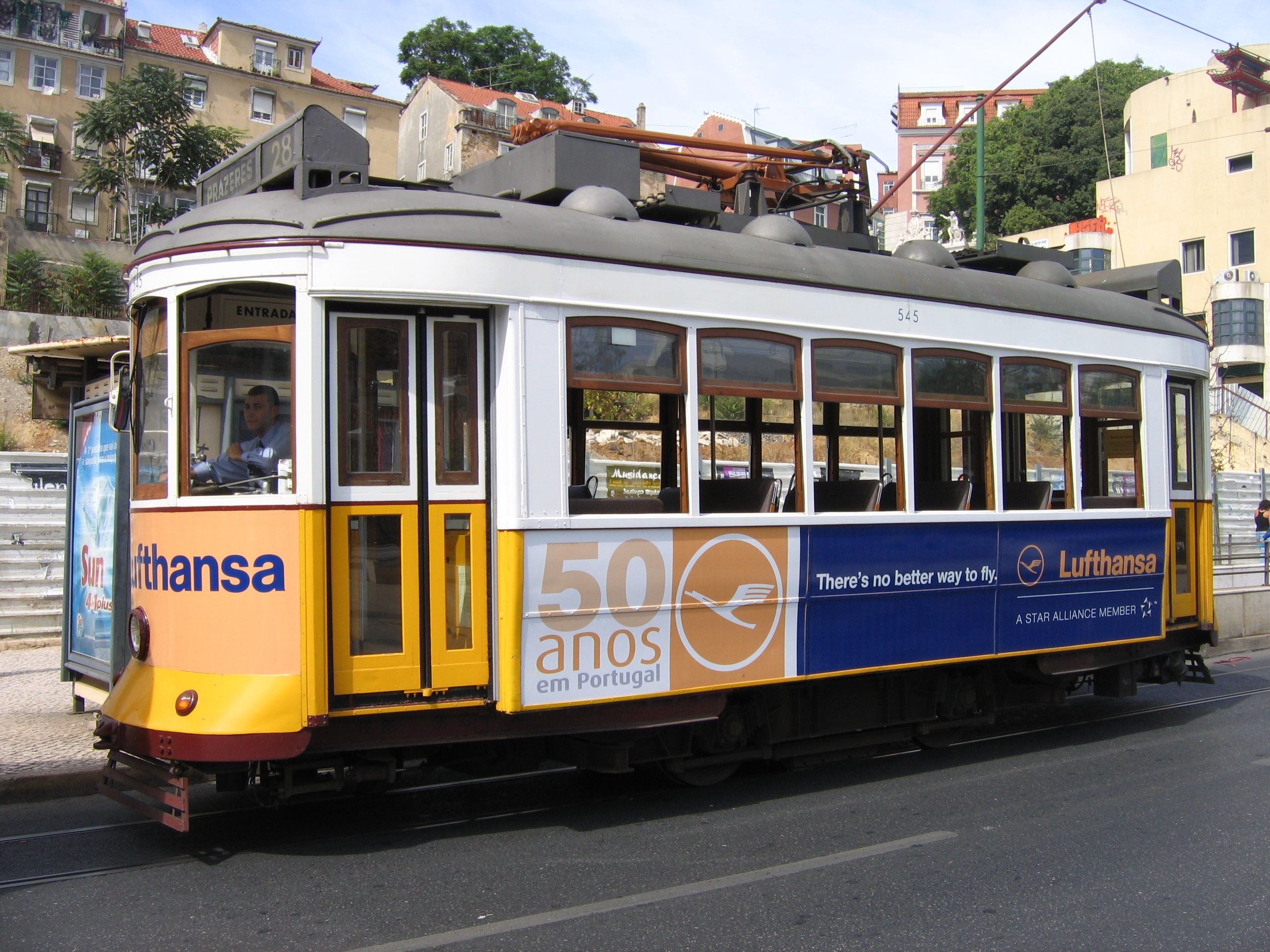
A Lufthansa advertisement in Lisbon

In addition to its namesake carrier, Lufthansa Group has several airline subsidiaries, including:

==== Network airlines ====
- Lufthansa — the flag carrier of Germany based in Frankfurt and Munich.
- Austrian Airlines – the flag carrier of Austria based at Vienna International Airport
- Brussels Airlines – the flag carrier of Belgium based at Brussels Airport
- Swiss International Air Lines – the flag carrier of Switzerland based at Zurich Airport
- ITA Airways – the flag carrier of Italy based at Rome Fiumicino Airport. Successor of Alitalia, owned by Italian government (59%) and Lufthansa Group (41%), with increase to 90% stake pending.

==== Feeder airlines ====
- Lufthansa City Airlines – Regional airline based in Munich started operations branded as Lufthansa City in June 2024.
- Air Dolomiti – Italian regional airline headquartered in Villafranca di Verona and based in Munich and Frankfurt.

==== Low-cost airlines ====
- Eurowings – German low-cost point to point airline headquartered in Düsseldorf.
- Eurowings Europe Ltd. – Maltese-registered low-cost airline, subsidiary of Eurowings Group, formerly Eurowings Europe GmbH (2016–2023), an Austrian-registered low-cost airline.

==== Leisure airlines ====
- Discover Airlines — German medium- and long-haul leisure airline, doing business as EW Discover GmbH, originally known as Eurowings Discover.
- Edelweiss Air – Swiss leisure airline, subsidiary of Swiss International Air Lines.
- SunExpress – Turkish leisure airline, jointly owned by Lufthansa Group (50%) and Turkish Airlines (50%)

==== Former ====
- British Midland International (wholly owned 2009–2011, stake owned since 1999) – United Kingdom airline subsidiary sold to International Airlines Group (IAG) and merged into British Airways in 2012.
- Condor Flugdienst (1959–2004, stakes owned from 1955 until 2009) – former leisure subsidiary, shares gradually acquired by Thomas Cook AG, later owned by Thomas Cook Group
- Luftfahrtgesellschaft Walter (2017–2019)– Regional airline acquired from Air Berlin, sold to Zeitfracht in 2019
- Lufthansa CityLine – (1958–2026) German regional airline headquartered in Munich, shut down by Lufthansa in 2026.
- Lufthansa Italia (2008–2011) – Italian airline subsidiary
- SunExpress Deutschland (2011–2020) – German subsidiary of SunExpress
- Team Lufthansa (1996–2004) – An alliance of regional airlines from four countries (Germany, Denmark, Austria, and France), which flew niche routes on behalf of Lufthansa. It was replaced by Lufthansa Regional in 2004

Some Lufthansa Group members are also members of the Star Alliance. Lufthansa Group is the second-largest airline group in Europe by passengers, carrying 93 million in 2022.

==== Investment history ====
Lufthansa bought a 19% stake in JetBlue in December 2007 and entered a code-sharing agreement with the airline. It was the first major investment by a European carrier in an American carrier since the EU–U.S. Open Skies Agreement came into effect in 2008. Lufthansa sold its stake in JetBlue in March 2015.

On 28 October 2008, Lufthansa exercised its option to purchase a further 60% share in BMI (in addition to the 20% Lufthansa already owned), this resulted in a dispute with the former owner Sir Michael Bishop. Both parties reached an agreement at the end of June 2009, and the acquisition took place with effect from 1 July 2009. Lufthansa acquired the remaining 20% from Scandinavian Airlines on 1 November 2009, taking complete control of BMI.

On 25 May 2023, Lufthansa announced it would pay €325 million to acquire 41% of ITA Airways. Lufthansa also has an option to buy the rest of ITA at a later date, with the purchase price depending on ITA's business performance.

In January 2025, Lufthansa took a 10% stake in the Latvian flag carrier AirBaltic.

On 20 November 2025, Lufthansa Group announced its intention to bid in the privatization of Portugal’s national carrier — TAP Air Portugal, with an initial intention to acquire a minority stake.

==== Joint ventures ====
Lufthasa Group has four strategically and commercially important joint ventures:

- The Atlantic Joint Venture of Air Canada, United Airlines, Austrian Airlines, Lufthansa, SWISS, Brussels Airlines and Eurowings.
- The Europe Japan Joint Venture of All Nippon Airways, Austrian Airlines, Lufthansa, SWISS and ITA Airways.
- The Europe Singapore Joint Venture of Austrian Airlines, Brussels Airlines, Lufthansa, SWISS and Singapore Airlines.
- The Europe China Joint Venture of Air China, Shenzhen Airlines, Austrian Airlines, Lufthansa, and SWISS.

=== Logistics ===
Lufthansa Group's Logistics business segment includes Lufthansa Cargo, as well as the airfreight container management specialist Jettainer group, the time:matters group, which specialises in particularly urgent shipments, the subsidiary Heyworld, which specialises in tailored solutions for the e-commerce sector, and CB Customs Broker, the customs and customs clearance specialist. This business segment also encompasses Lufthansa Group’s 50% stake in the cargo airline AeroLogic. Lufthansa Cargo also has equity investments in various handling companies and smaller companies involved in various aspects of the sector’s digitalisation.

=== MRO ===
Lufthansa Group's MRO segment consists of Lufthansa Technik, the world’s leading manufacturer-independent provider of maintenance, repair and overhaul services (MRO) for civilian commercial aircraft.

In 2008, Lufthansa Technik restored a Junkers Ju 52/3m built in 1936 to airworthiness; this aircraft was in use on the 10-hour Berlin to Rome route, across the Alps, in the 1930s. Lufthansa is now restoring a Lockheed Super Constellation, using parts from three such aircraft bought at auctions. Lufthansa's Super Constellations and L1649 "Starliners" served routes such as Hamburg–Madrid–Dakar–Caracas–Santiago. Lufthansa Technik recruits retired employees and volunteers for skilled labour.

=== Additional businesses and group functions ===
The Additional Businesses and Group Functions segment include Lufthansa Group's service companies, including Lufthansa Aviation Training and Lufthansa Systems, as well as the Group Functions for Lufthansa Group.

Until April 2009, Lufthansa inventory and departure control systems, based on Unisys, were managed by LH Systems. Lufthansa reservations systems were outsourced to Amadeus in the early 1990s. Following a decision to outsource all components of the Passenger Service System, the functions were outsourced to the Altéa platform managed by Amadeus.

Since 2007 Lufthansa Systems, the IT services provider branch of the group relies on solutions by Actian, such as Ingres database and the OpenROAD platform, to power its Lido/FlightPlanning solution, which is used by around 300 commercial airlines across the world for flight planning.

Lufthansa Cargo, the cargo airline subsidiary of Lufthansa, uses Zeenea Data Discovery Platform as their data catalog solution. Zeenea is a French metadata management startup founded in Paris in 2017. On 8 August 2024, HCLSoftware announced intent to acquire Zeenea for 24 million euros, which is expected to continue operating as an independent unit under Actian, their data & analytics division.

=== Ownership ===
Lufthansa was a state-owned enterprise until 1994. Deutsche Lufthansa AG shares have been publicly traded on all German stock exchanges since 1966. In addition to floor trading, it is also traded electronically using the Xetra system. It is a DAX index share and is listed in the Frankfurt Stock Exchange's Prime Standard. At the end of 2019, the shareholders' register showed that German investors held 67.3% of the shares (previous year: 72.1%). The second-largest group, with 10.4%, was shareholders from Luxembourg. Investors from the US accounted for 8.1%, followed by Ireland and the United Kingdom, each with 3.6%. This ensures compliance with the provisions of the German Aviation Compliance Documentation Act (LuftNaSiG). As of the reporting date, 58% of the shares were held by institutional investors (previous year: 53%), and 42% were held by private individuals (previous year: 47%). Lansdowne Partners International Ltd. and BlackRock, Inc. were the largest shareholders in Lufthansa Group at year-end, with 4.9% and 3.1% respectively. All the transactions requiring disclosure and published during the financial year 2019, as well as the quarterly updates on the shareholder structure, are available online. During the 2020 COVID crisis Heinz Hermann Thiele increased his stake to more than 12%; he died a few months later. The free float for Lufthansa shares was 67% in 2020, as per the definition of the Deutsche Börse.

=== Business trends ===
The key trends for Lufthansa Group are (as of the end of the calendar year):

| Year | Revenue (in billion €) | Net income (in billion €) | Employees | Passengers (in millions) | Passenger load factor (%) | Cargo load factor (%) | Aircraft | Ref |
|---|---|---|---|---|---|---|---|---|
| 2009 | 22.2 | (0.04) | 117,000 | 77.3 | 77.9 | 60.6 | 722 | |
| 2010 | 27.3 | 1.1 | 117,000 | 91.2 | 79.3 | 68.0 | 710 | |
| 2011 | 28.7 | (0.01) | 116,000 | 100 | 77.6 | 66.8 | 636 | |
| 2012 | 30.1 | 0.99 | 117,000 | 103 | 78.8 | 66.9 | 627 | |
| 2013 | 30.0 | 0.31 | 118,000 | 104 | 79.8 | 69.1 | 622 | |
| 2014 | 30.0 | 0.05 | 118,000 | 106 | 80.1 | 69.9 | 615 | |
| 2015 | 32.0 | 1.6 | 120,000 | 107 | 80.4 | 66.3 | 602 | |
| 2016 | 31.6 | 1.7 | 124,000 | 109 | 79.1 | 66.6 | 617 | |
| 2017 | 35.5 | 2.3 | 129,000 | 130 | 80.9 | 69.3 | 728 | |
| 2018 | 35.5 | 2.1 | 135,000 | 141 | 81.5 | 66.6 | 763 | |
| 2019 | 36.4 | 1.2 | 138,000 | 145 | 82.6 | 61.4 | 763 | |
| 2020 | 13.5 | (6.7) | 110,000 | 36.4 | 63.2 | 69.6 | 757 | (Note: 2020: Activities and income in fiscal 2020 were severely reduced by the impact of the coronavirus pandemic) |
| 2021 | 16.8 | (2.1) | 105,000 | 46.9 | 61.6 | 71.4 | 713 | |
| 2022 | 32.7 | 0.79 | 109,000 | 101 | 79.8 | 60.3 | 710 | |
| 2023 | 35.4 | 1.6 | 96,600 | 122 | 82.9 | 56.4 | 721 | |
| 2024 | 37.5 | 1.3 | 101,000 | 131 | 83.1 | 58.2 | 735 | |
| 2025 | 39.5 | 1.3 | 103,000 | 135 | 83.2 | 58.3 | 737 | |

The key trends for Lufthansa Airlines are (as of the end of the calendar year):

| Year | Revenue (in billion €) | Net income (in billion €) | Employees | Passengers (in millions) | Passenger load factor (%) | Aircraft | Ref |
|---|---|---|---|---|---|---|---|
| 2016 | 15.4 | 1.6 | 34,126 | 62.4 | 79.1 | 350 | |
| 2017 | 16.4 | 2.1 | 33,779 | 65.8 | 81.6 | 357 | |
| 2018 | 15.8 | 1.7 | 34,754 | 69.8 | 81.3 | 351 | |
| 2019 | 16.6 | 1.1 | 39,582 | 72.4 | 82.5 | 364 | |
| 2020 | 4.1 | (4.7) | 37,741 | 17.9 | 62.1 | 421 | (Note: 2020: Activities and income in fiscal 2020 were severely reduced by the impact of the coronavirus pandemic) |
| 2021 | 5.0 | (2.5) | 35,738 | 23.5 | 60.3 | 389 | |
| 2022 | 13.1 | (0.43) | 34,408 | 51.7 | 79.9 | 386 | |
| 2023 | 16.1 | 0.86 | 36,707 | 60.2 | 82.4 | 381 | |
| 2024 | 16.5 | (0.11) | 39,323 | 64.4 | 82.8 | 387 | |
| 2025 | 17.1 | 0.17 | 39,858 | 65.7 | 83.4 | 387 | |

=== Headquarters ===
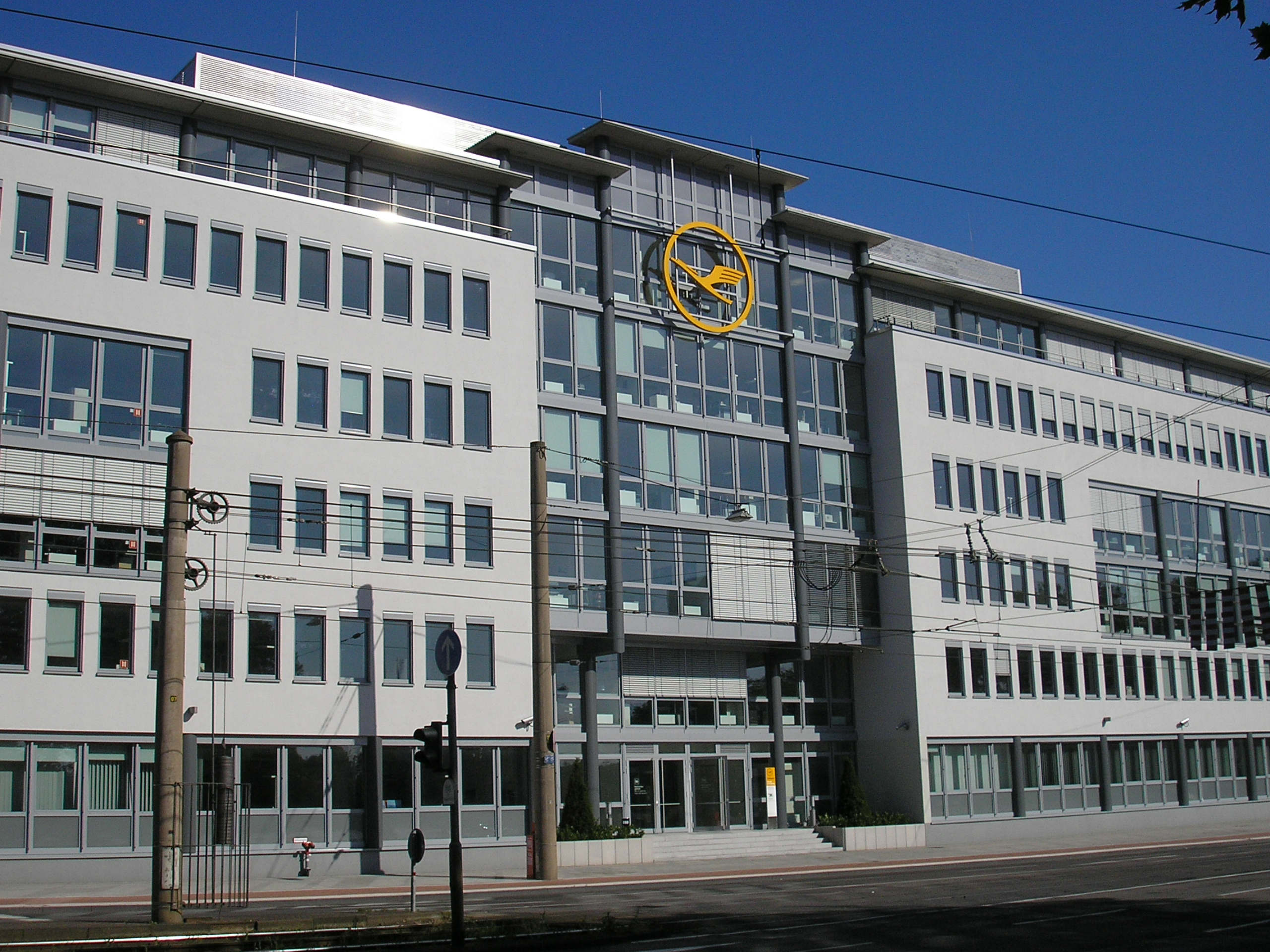
Lufthansa's former headquarters in Deutz, Cologne

Lufthansa's corporate headquarters are in Cologne. In 1971, Lawrence Fellows of The New York Times described the then-new headquarters building that Lufthansa occupied in Cologne as "gleaming". In 1986, left-wing terrorists bombed the building. No one was injured. In 2006, builders laid the first stone of the new Lufthansa headquarters in Deutz, Cologne. By the end of 2007, Lufthansa planned to move 800 employees, including the company's finance department, to the new building. However, in early 2013, Lufthansa revealed plans to relocate its head office from Cologne to Frankfurt by 2017.

Several Lufthansa departments are not at the headquarters; instead, they are in the Lufthansa Aviation Center at Frankfurt Airport. These departments include Corporate Communications and Investor Relations. The Aviation Center with a transparent facade and several indoor gardens was designed by Christoph Ingenhoven.

=== Employment relations ===
Relations between Lufthansa and their pilots had been very tense in circa 2015, with many strikes occurring, causing many flights to be cancelled, as well as major losses to the company. A major dispute between Lufthansa and the pilot's union has been settled after nearly five years and overall 14 strikes in December 2017. Without taking into account the €9 billion bailout from the German government, Lufthansa cut 31,000 jobs in the COVID-19 years. During the 2022 collective bargaining, Verdi said that Lufthansa's wage offer meant real wage losses for employees and called on around 20,000 ground workers in Germany to go on warning strikes.

=== Branding ===
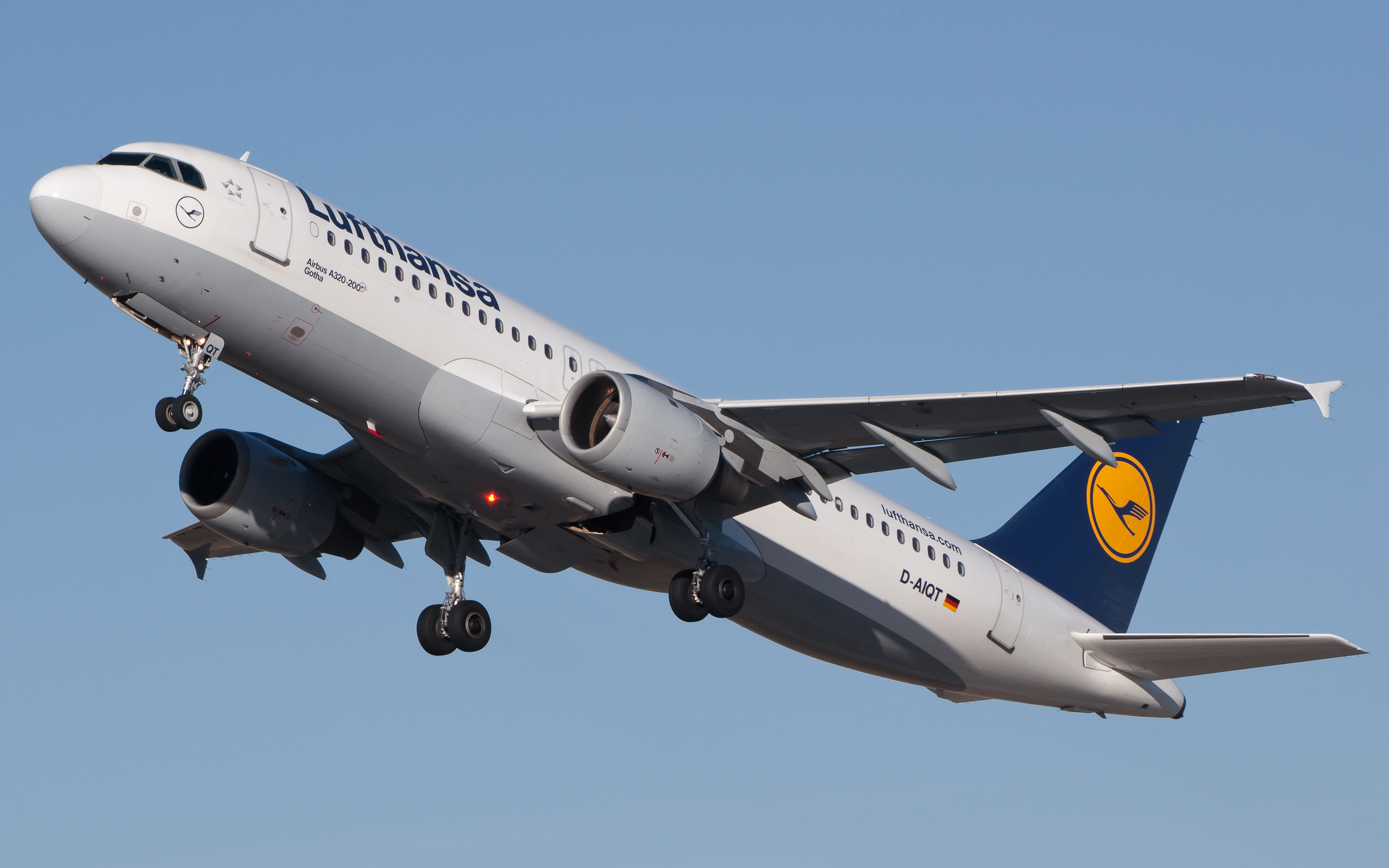
A Lufthansa Airbus A320-200 in the old livery used since 1988

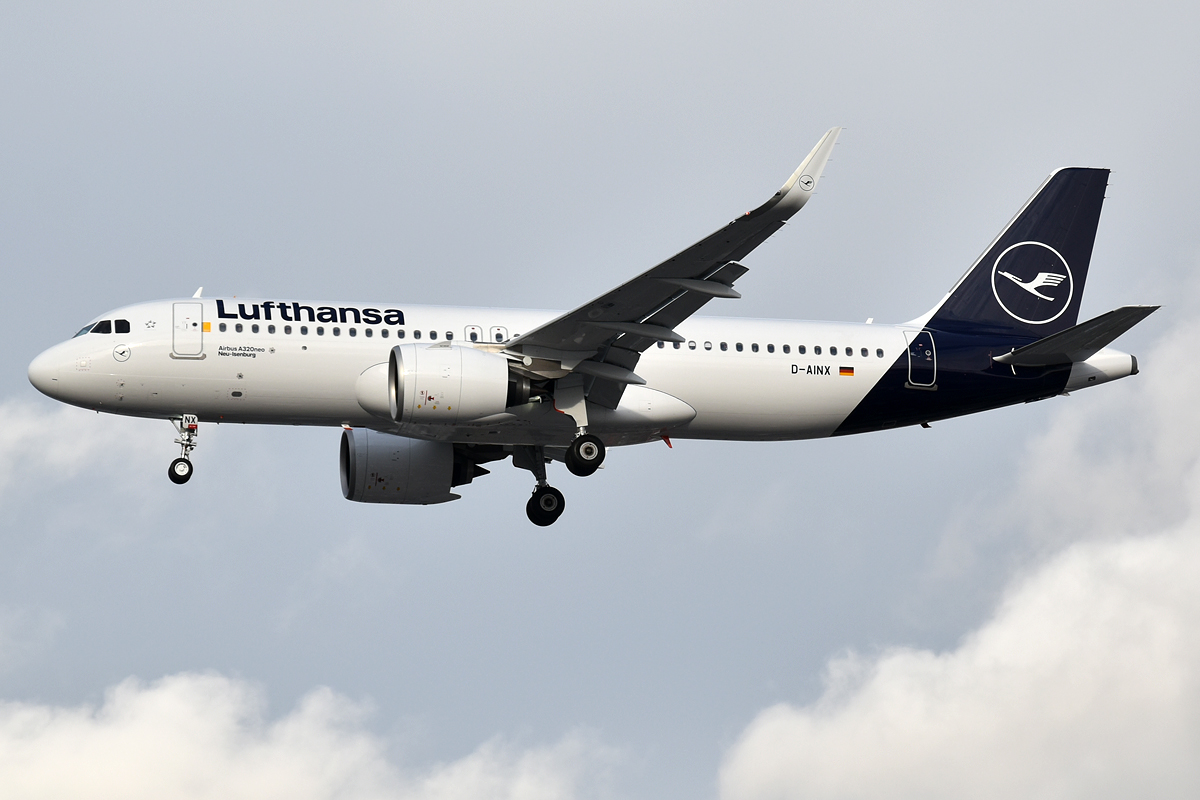
A Lufthansa Airbus A320neo in the livery adapted since 2018

The Lufthansa logo, an encircled stylised crane in flight, was first created in 1918 by Otto Firle. It was part of the livery of the first German airline, Deutsche Luft-Reederei (abbreviated DLR), which began air service on 5 February 1919. In 1926, Deutsche Luft Hansa adopted this symbol, and in 1954, Lufthansa expressed continuity by adopting it and later in 1963 – a variant thereof as redesigned by Robert Lisovskyi.

The original creator of the name Lufthansa is believed to be F.A. Fischer von Puturzyn. In 1925, he published a book entitled "Luft-Hansa" which examined the options open to aviation policymakers at the time. Luft Hansa was the name given to the new airline, which resulted from the merger of Junkers' airline (Luftverkehr AG) and Deutscher Aero Lloyd.

After World War II, the company kept blue and yellow as its main colours and the crane logo. Since the beginning of the 1960s, Helvetica was used for the company name in the livery. The 1970s retro livery featured the top half of the fuselage painted in all-white on top and the lower fuselage (bottom half, including the engines) was gray/silver aluminium, below a blue cheatline window band and a black painted nose. The crane logo was painted blue on the engines, on the bottom half of the fuselage just below the cockpit windows, and a yellow circle inside a blue band on the tail.

German designer Otl Aicher created a comprehensive corporate design for the airline in 1967. The crane logo was now always displayed in a circle which, on the livery, was yellow on an otherwise blue tailfin. Helvetica was used as the main typeface for both the livery and publications. The blue band and general paint scheme of the aircraft were retained from the previous livery.

Aicher's concept was retained in the 1988 design. The window band was removed, and the fuselage was painted in grey.

In 2018, Lufthansa changed their livery. The encircled crane was retained, and the background changed from yellow to dark blue. The vertical stabilizer and the rear fuselage were painted in dark blue, and the tail cone remained white. The main fuselage was painted in all white, and the brand name "Lufthansa" was painted above the windows, also in dark blue.

The company slogan is 'Say yes to the world.'

== Destinations ==
This list details Lufthansa's 2026 destinations, including those operated by its feeder subsidiary, Lufthansa City Airlines.

| Country | City | Airport | Notes |
|---|---|---|---|
| Albania | Tirana | Tirana International Airport Nënë Tereza | |
| Algeria | Algiers | Houari Boumediene Airport | |
| Angola | Luanda | Dr. António Agostinho Neto International Airport | |
| Argentina | Buenos Aires | Ministro Pistarini International Airport | |
| Armenia | Yerevan | Zvartnots International Airport | |
| Austria | Graz | Graz Airport | |
| Austria | Salzburg | Salzburg Airport | |
| Austria | Vienna | Vienna International Airport | |
| Azerbaijan | Baku | Heydar Aliyev International Airport | |
| Belgium | Brussels | Brussels Airport | |
| Bosnia & Herzegovina | Sarajevo | Sarajevo International Airport | |
| Brazil | Rio de Janeiro | Galeão International Airport | |
| Brazil | São Paulo | Guarulhos International Airport | |
| Bulgaria | Sofia | Sofia Airport | |
| Canada | Vancouver | Vancouver International Airport | |
| Canada | Toronto | Pearson International Airport | |
| Canada | Montreal | Montréal–Trudeau International Airport | |
| China | Beijing | Beijing Capital International Airport | |
| China | Shanghai | Pudong International Airport | |
| Colombia | Bogotá | El Dorado International Airport | |
| Costa Rica | San José | Juan Santamaría International Airport | |
| Croatia | Dubrovnik | Dubrovnik Airport | Seasonal |
| Croatia | Pula | Pula Airport | Seasonal |
| Croatia | Rijeka | Rijeka Airport | Seasonal |
| Croatia | Split | Split Airport | |
| Croatia | Zadar | Zadar Airport | Seasonal |
| Croatia | Zagreb | Zagreb Airport | |
| Czech Republic | Prague | Václav Havel Airport Prague | |
| Denmark | Billund | Billund Airport | |
| Denmark | Copenhagen | Copenhagen Airport | |
| Egypt | Cairo | Cairo International Airport | |
| Estonia | Tallinn | Tallinn Airport | |
| Finland | Helsinki | Helsinki Airport | |
| Finland | Ivalo | Ivalo Airport | Seasonal |
| Finland | Kittilä | Kittilä Airport | Seasonal |
| Finland | Kuusamo | Kuusamo Airport | Seasonal |
| Finland | Rovaniemi | Rovaniemi Airport | Seasonal |
| France | Bordeaux | Bordeaux–Mérignac Airport | |
| France | Lyon | Lyon–Saint-Exupéry Airport | |
| France | Marseille | Marseille Provence Airport | |
| France | Nantes | Nantes Atlantique Airport | |
| France | Nice | Nice Côte d'Azur Airport | |
| France | Paris | Charles de Gaulle Airport | |
| France | Strasbourg | Strasbourg Airport | |
| France | Toulouse | Toulouse–Blagnac Airport | |
| Georgia | Tbilisi | Tbilisi International Airport | |
| Germany | Stuttgart | Stuttgart Airport | |
| Germany | Munich | Munich Airport | Hub |
| Germany | Nuremberg | Nuremberg Airport | |
| Germany | Berlin | Berlin Brandenburg Airport | |
| Germany | Bremen | Bremen Airport | |
| Germany | Hamburg | Hamburg Airport | |
| Germany | Frankfurt | Frankfurt Airport | Hub |
| Germany | Hanover | Hannover Airport | |
| Germany | Heringsdorf | Heringsdorf Airport | Seasonal |
| Germany | Cologne / Bonn | Cologne Bonn Airport | |
| Germany | Düsseldorf | Düsseldorf Airport | |
| Germany | Münster | Münster Osnabrück Airport | |
| Germany | Dresden | Dresden Airport | |
| Germany | Leipzig | Leipzig/Halle Airport | |
| Germany | Westerland | Sylt Airport | Seasonal |
| Greece | Athens | Athens International Airport | |
| Greece | Heraklion | Heraklion International Airport | Seasonal |
| Greece | Mykonos | Mykonos Airport | |
| Greece | Thessaloniki | Thessaloniki Airport | Seasonal |
| Hong Kong | Hong Kong | Hong Kong International Airport | |
| Hungary | Budapest | Liszt Ferenc International Airport | |
| Hungary | Debrecen | Debrecen International Airport | |
| Iceland | Reykjavík | Keflavík International Airport | |
| India | Bengaluru | Kempegowda International Airport | |
| India | Chennai | Chennai International Airport | |
| India | Hyderabad | Rajiv Gandhi International Airport | |
| India | Mumbai | Shivaji Maharaj International Airport | |
| India | New Delhi | Indira Gandhi International Airport | |
| Iran | Tehran | Imam Khomeini International Airport | |
| Ireland | Cork | Cork Airport | Seasonal |
| Ireland | Dublin | Dublin Airport | |
| Israel | Tel Aviv | Ben Gurion International Airport | |
| Italy | Ancona | Marche Airport | |
| Italy | Bari | Bari Karol Wojtyła Airport | |
| Italy | Bologna | Bologna Guglielmo Marconi Airport | |
| Italy | Brindisi | Brindisi Airport | |
| Italy | Cagliari | Cagliari Elmas Airport | Seasonal |
| Italy | Catania | Catania–Fontanarossa Airport | |
| Italy | Genoa | Genoa Cristoforo Colombo Airport | |
| Italy | Milan | Milan Linate Airport | |
| Italy | Milan | Milan Malpensa Airport | |
| Italy | Lamezia Terme | Lamezia Terme International Airport | Seasonal |
| Italy | Naples | Naples International Airport | |
| Italy | Olbia | Olbia Costa Smeralda Airport | |
| Italy | Palermo | Falcone Borsellino Airport | |
| Italy | Rome | Leonardo da Vinci–Fiumicino Airport | |
| Italy | Turin | Turin Airport | |
| Italy | Venice | Venice Marco Polo Airport | |
| Japan | Tokyo | Tokyo Haneda Airport | |
| Japan | Tokyo | Tokyo Narita Airport | |
| Japan | Osaka | Kansai International Airport | |
| Jordan | Amman | Queen Alia International Airport | |
| Kazakhstan | Almaty | Almaty International Airport | Seasonal |
| Kazakhstan | Astana | Nursultan Nazarbayev International Airport | Seasonal |
| Latvia | Riga | Riga International Airport | |
| Lebanon | Beirut | Rafic Hariri International Airport | |
| Lithuania | Vilnius | Vilnius Airport | |
| Luxembourg | Luxembourg | Luxembourg Airport | |
| Malta | Luqa | Malta International Airport | |
| Mexico | Mexico City | Mexico City International Airport | |
| Moldova | Chișinău | Chișinău International Airport | |
| Montenegro | Tivat | Tivat Airport | |
| Morocco | Casablanca | Mohammed V International Airport | |
| Netherlands | Amsterdam | Amsterdam Airport Schiphol | |
| Nigeria | Abuja | Nnamdi Azikiwe International Airport | |
| Nigeria | Lagos | Murtala Muhammed International Airport | |
| Nigeria | Port Harcourt | Port Harcourt International Airport | |
| Norway | Bergen | Bergen Airport | |
| Norway | Oslo | Oslo Gardermoen Airport | |
| Norway | Stavanger | Stavanger Airport | |
| Norway | Tromsø | Tromsø Airport | |
| Poland | Bydgoszcz | Bydgoszcz Ignacy Jan Paderewski Airport | |
| Poland | Gdańsk | Gdańsk Lech Wałęsa Airport | |
| Poland | Kraków | John Paul II International Airport | |
| Poland | Poznań | Poznań–Ławica Airport | |
| Poland | Warsaw | Warsaw Chopin Airport | |
| Poland | Wrocław | Copernicus Airport Wrocław | |
| Portugal | Faro | Faro Airport | |
| Portugal | Lisbon | Humberto Delgado Airport | |
| Portugal | Ponta Delgada | João Paulo II Airport | |
| Portugal | Porto | Francisco Sá Carneiro Airport | |
| Romania | Bucharest | Henri Coandă International Airport | |
| Romania | Cluj-Napoca | Cluj International Airport | |
| Romania | Timișoara | Traian Vuia International Airport | |
| Saudi Arabia | Dammam | King Fahd International Airport | |
| Saudi Arabia | Riyadh | King Khalid International Airport | |
| Serbia | Belgrade | Belgrade Nikola Tesla Airport | |
| Singapore | Singapore | Changi Airport | |
| Slovenia | Ljubljana | Ljubljana Jože Pučnik Airport | |
| South Africa | Cape Town | Cape Town International Airport | |
| South Africa | Johannesburg | O. R. Tambo International Airport | |
| South Korea | Seoul | Incheon International Airport | |
| Spain | Alicante | Alicante–Elche Miguel Hernández Airport | |
| Spain | Barcelona | Josep Tarradellas Barcelona–El Prat Airport | |
| Spain | Bilbao | Bilbao Airport | |
| Spain | Ibiza | Ibiza Airport | |
| Spain | Madrid | Madrid–Barajas Airport | |
| Spain | Málaga | Málaga Airport | |
| Spain | Palma de Mallorca | Palma de Mallorca Airport | |
| Spain | Seville | Seville Airport | |
| Spain | Valencia | Valencia Airport | |
| Sweden | Gothenburg | Göteborg Landvetter Airport | |
| Sweden | Stockholm | Stockholm Arlanda Airport | |
| Switzerland | Geneva | Geneva Airport | |
| Switzerland | Zurich | Zurich Airport | |
| Thailand | Bangkok | Suvarnabhumi Airport | |
| Tunisia | Tunis | Tunis–Carthage International Airport | |
| Turkey | Istanbul | Istanbul Airport | |
| Turkey | İzmir | Adnan Menderes Airport | |
| United Arab Emirates | Dubai | Dubai International Airport | |
| United Kingdom | Birmingham | Birmingham Airport | |
| United Kingdom | London | Heathrow Airport | |
| United Kingdom | Manchester | Manchester Airport | |
| United Kingdom | Newcastle upon Tyne | Newcastle International Airport | |
| United Kingdom | Edinburgh | Edinburgh Airport | |
| United Kingdom | Glasgow | Glasgow Airport | |
| United States | Atlanta | Hartsfield–Jackson Atlanta International Airport | |
| United States | Austin | Austin–Bergstrom International Airport | |
| United States | Boston | Logan International Airport | |
| United States | Charlotte | Charlotte Douglas International Airport | |
| United States | Chicago | O'Hare International Airport | |
| United States | Dallas | Dallas/Fort Worth International Airport | |
| United States | Denver | Denver International Airport | |
| United States | Detroit | Detroit Metropolitan Airport | |
| United States | Fort Myers | Southwest Florida International Airport | |
| United States | Houston | George Bush Intercontinental Airport | |
| United States | Las Vegas | Harry Reid International Airport | |
| United States | Los Angeles | Los Angeles International Airport | |
| United States | San Diego | San Diego International Airport | |
| United States | San Francisco | San Francisco International Airport | |
| United States | Miami | Miami International Airport | |
| United States | New York City | John F. Kennedy International Airport | |
| United States | Newark | Newark Liberty International Airport | |
| United States | Orlando | Orlando International Airport | |
| United States | Philadelphia | Philadelphia International Airport | |
| United States | Raleigh / Durham | Raleigh–Durham International Airport | |
| United States | San Diego | San Diego International Airport | |
| United States | San Francisco | San Francisco International Airport | |
| United States | Seattle | Seattle–Tacoma International Airport | |
| United States | St. Louis | St. Louis Lambert International Airport | |
| United States | Washington, D.C. | Dulles International Airport | |
| Jersey | St Peter | Jersey Airport | |

=== Interline agreements ===
Lufthansa have interline agreements with the following airline partners:

- Air Astana
- Airlink
- Azul Brazilian Airlines
- Air Transat
- KTX (Railway)
- Kuwait Airways
- Scoot
- Uzbekistan Airways

=== Codeshare agreements ===
==== Sister airlines ====
Lufthansa have codeshare agreements with the following Lufthansa Group airlines:

- Air Dolomiti
- Austrian Airlines
- Brussels Airlines
- Discover Airlines
- Edelweiss Air
- Eurowings
- ITA Airways
- Lufthansa City Airlines
- SunExpress
- Swiss International Air Lines

==== Other airlines ====
Lufthansa have codeshare agreements with the following airline partners:

- Aegean Airlines
- Air Astana
- Air Canada
- Air China
- Air India
- Air New Zealand
- airBaltic
- Airlink
- All Nippon Airways
- Asiana Airlines
- Avianca
- Azerbaijan Airlines
- Bangkok Airways
- Cathay Pacific
- Copa Airlines
- Croatia Airlines
- DAT
- Deutsche Bahn (railway)
- EgyptAir
- Ethiopian Airlines
- Etihad Airways
- KM Malta Airlines
- LATAM Airlines
- LATAM Colombia
- LOT Polish Airlines
- Luxair
- Oman Air
- Shenzhen Airlines
- Singapore Airlines
- South African Airways
- TAP Air Portugal
- Thai Airways International
- Turkish Airlines
- United Airlines
- Widerøe

== Fleet ==
=== Aircraft naming conventions ===
In September 1960, a Lufthansa Boeing 707 (D-ABOC), which would serve the Frankfurt-New York intercontinental route, was christened Berlin after the divided city of Berlin by then-mayor Willy Brandt. Following Berlin, other Lufthansa 707 planes were named "Hamburg", "Frankfurt", "München", and "Bonn". With these names, the company established a tradition of naming the planes in its fleet after German cities and towns or federal states, with a rule of thumb that the aeroplane make, size, or route would correspond roughly to the relative size or importance of the city or town it was named after.

This tradition continued, with two notable exceptions, until 2010: The first was an Airbus A340-300 registered D-AIFC, named "Gander/Halifax", after two Canadian cities along the standard flight path from Europe to North America. It became the first Lufthansa aeroplane named after a non-German city. The name commemorates the hospitality of the communities of Gander and Halifax, which served as improvised safe havens for the passengers and crew of the multitude of international aircraft unable to return to their originating airports during Operation Yellow Ribbon after the September 11, 2001 attacks. The other aircraft not named after a German city was an Airbus A321-100 registered as D-AIRA, which was designated Finkenwerder in honor of the Airbus facility in the district of Hamburg-Finkenwerder, where about 40% of Airbus narrowbody models are manufactured.

In February 2010, Lufthansa announced that its first two Airbus A380s would be named Frankfurt am Main (D-AIMA) and München (D-AIMB) after Lufthansa's two hub airports. Subsequent A380 aircraft were named after other Lufthansa Group hub airports Zürich, Wien (Vienna) and Brüssel (Brussels) and the major German cities of Düsseldorf and Berlin. The remaining A380s were named after Star Alliance hub cities Tokyo, Beijing, Johannesburg, New York, San Francisco and Delhi. However, D-AIMN San Francisco was renamed Deutschland (Germany) in 2014.

As of 2014, there were several short- and long-haul aircraft in Lufthansa's fleet that do not bear any names. They either never received one or their former one has been given to a newer aircraft, which was the case for several Boeing 747-400s. For example, the former Bayern (Bavaria), a Boeing 747-400 still in active service, lost that name to a new Boeing 747-8I.

=== Airbus A380 ===
Lufthansa had initially ordered a total of fifteen Airbus A380-800, of which ten were delivered by June 2012. In September 2011, two more A380s were ordered; this order was confirmed on 14 March 2013. However, in September 2013 it was announced that the Lufthansa Supervisory Board had approved the purchase of only twelve of the first fifteen A380s. Thus, a total of fourteen A380s have been added to the fleet.

Lufthansa used initially its A380s from and to Frankfurt am Main (nine aircraft) and since March 2018 to and from Munich as well (five aircraft). From 6 to 12 December 2011, Lufthansa already used an A380 once a day on the route from Munich to New York-JFK. This happened mainly against the backdrop of Christmas shopping in New York City.

On 13 March 2019, Lufthansa announced that it will be removing six A380 aircraft from the fleet and replacing them with Boeing 787-9 and Airbus A350-900 aircraft. Those six aircraft were sold back to Airbus for €315 million, and all will have exited the fleet by November 2023. It was later disclosed that the sale price was reduced to €302 million because five of the six A380-800s sustained storm damage, which was not covered by insurance while stored.

On 8 March 2020, Lufthansa announced that it would be grounding all of its A380 aircraft due to the COVID-19 pandemic.

Lufthansa announced on 27 June 2022 that the remaining fleet of eight A380s will be reactivated and brought back into service for the 2023 summer season. The stronger than anticipated customer demand and quicker recovery of international travel from the pandemic is cited as one of two reasons. The other reason is the persistent delay of Boeing 777-9 delivery, which Lufthansa would not receive until 2025 or later. Lufthansa is still assessing how many and which A380 will be reactivated and which routes the A380 will serve again.

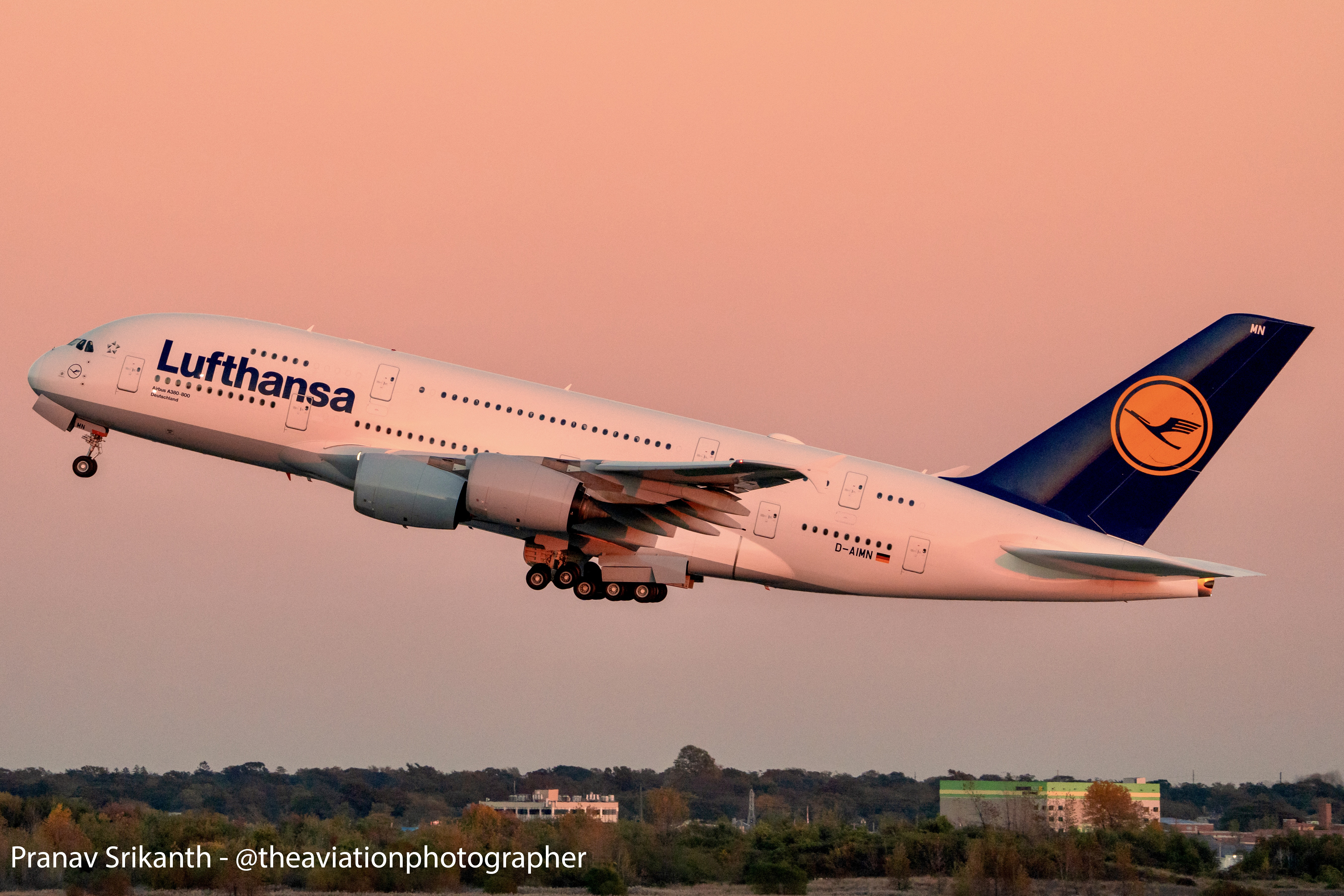
Lufthansa A380 Deutschland departing New York (2023)

On 2 December 2022, Lufthansa reactivated the first of two A380s to be entered into revenue service beginning in the summer of 2023. The first A380 to be reactivated was a nine-year-old D-AIMK, which left Teruel Airport for Frankfurt Airport after three years of storage. Since the A380 was inactive for a long time, the landing gear was not retracted during the flight, out of fear that it might not deploy again. The A380 flew at slower speeds and lower altitudes, lasting three hours. After the preparatory evaluation and minor repairs in Frankfurt, the A380 departed for Lufthansa Technik in Manila, Philippines for the extensive maintenance and replacement work.

Following their reactivation, Lufthansa announced the A380 was to begin revenue flights from Munich to Boston Logan on 1 June 2023 and New York-JFK on 4 July 2023, with routes to Los Angeles and Bangkok to follow in October.

The airline reactivated its eighth and last remaining A380 in September 2024.

== Services ==
=== Frequent-flyer programme ===
Lufthansa's frequent-flyer programme is called Miles & More, and is shared among several European airlines, including all of Lufthansa's subsidiary airlines (excluding the SunExpress joint ventures), Croatia Airlines, LOT Polish Airlines, and Luxair (previously part-owned by Lufthansa). Miles & More members may earn miles on Lufthansa flights and Star Alliance partner flights, as well as through Miles & More credit cards, and purchases made through the Lufthansa shops. Status within Miles & More is determined by points earned through flights within Star Alliance (Points) and Miles & More partner airlines (Qualifying Points, HON Circle Points) during one calendar year. Membership levels are: Miles & More member (no minimal threshold), Frequent Traveller (Star Alliance Silver, 650 Points, 325 Qualifying Points), Senator (Star Alliance Gold, 2000 Points, 1000 Qualifying Points), and HON Circle Member (Star Alliance Gold, 6000 HON Circle Points). All Miles & More status levels higher than Miles & More members offer lounge access and executive bonus miles, with the higher levels offering more exclusive benefits.

=== Cabins ===
==== First Class ====
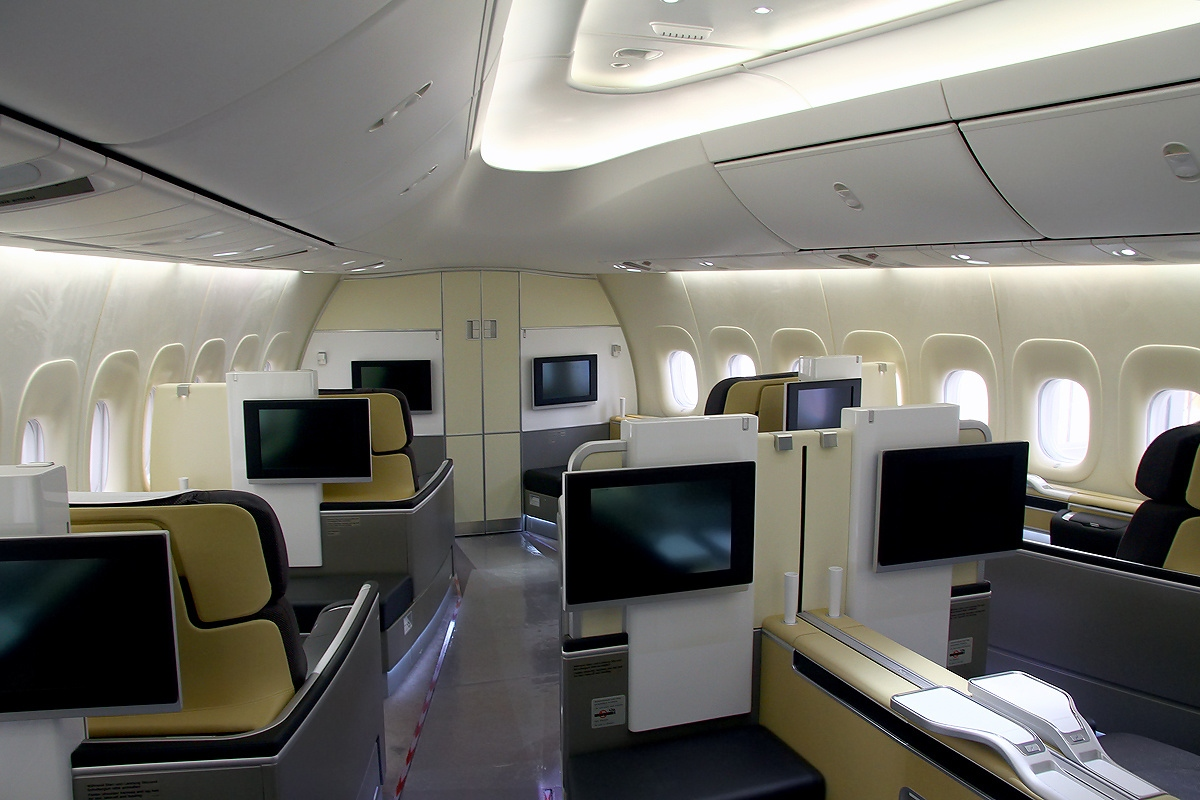
First Class of Lufthansa's Boeing 747-8Is in a 1-2-1 layout

First Class is offered on Airbus A340-600s, the front of the upper deck on Airbus A380s, and the nose of the main deck on Boeing 747-8s. Each seat converts to a 2 metres (6 ft 7 in) bed, and includes laptop power outlets, as well as entertainment facilities. Meals are available on demand. Lufthansa offers dedicated First Class check-in counters at most airports, and offers dedicated First Class lounges in Frankfurt and Munich, as well as a dedicated first-class terminal in Frankfurt. Arriving passengers have the option of using Lufthansa's First Class arrival facilities, as well as the new Welcome Lounge. Lufthansa introduced a new First Class product aboard the Airbus A380 and planned to gradually introduce it on all of its long-haul aircraft. However, with the new program SCORE, introduced to boost profits by 1.5 billion euros over the following years, Lufthansa halted route expansion and extensively decreased its First Class offerings on most routes. In October 2022, a new suite style First Class product was unveiled, and will be introduced on new A350 deliveries in 2023. In 2017 the airline announced that its first few Boeing 777-9s would not include First Class seats, however, First Class could be installed on later deliveries. As of June 2021, the only remaining First Class seats Lufthansa offered were on its Boeing 747-8Is, with 10 Airbus A350-900s with First Class seats to be delivered starting in July 2023.

==== Business Class ====
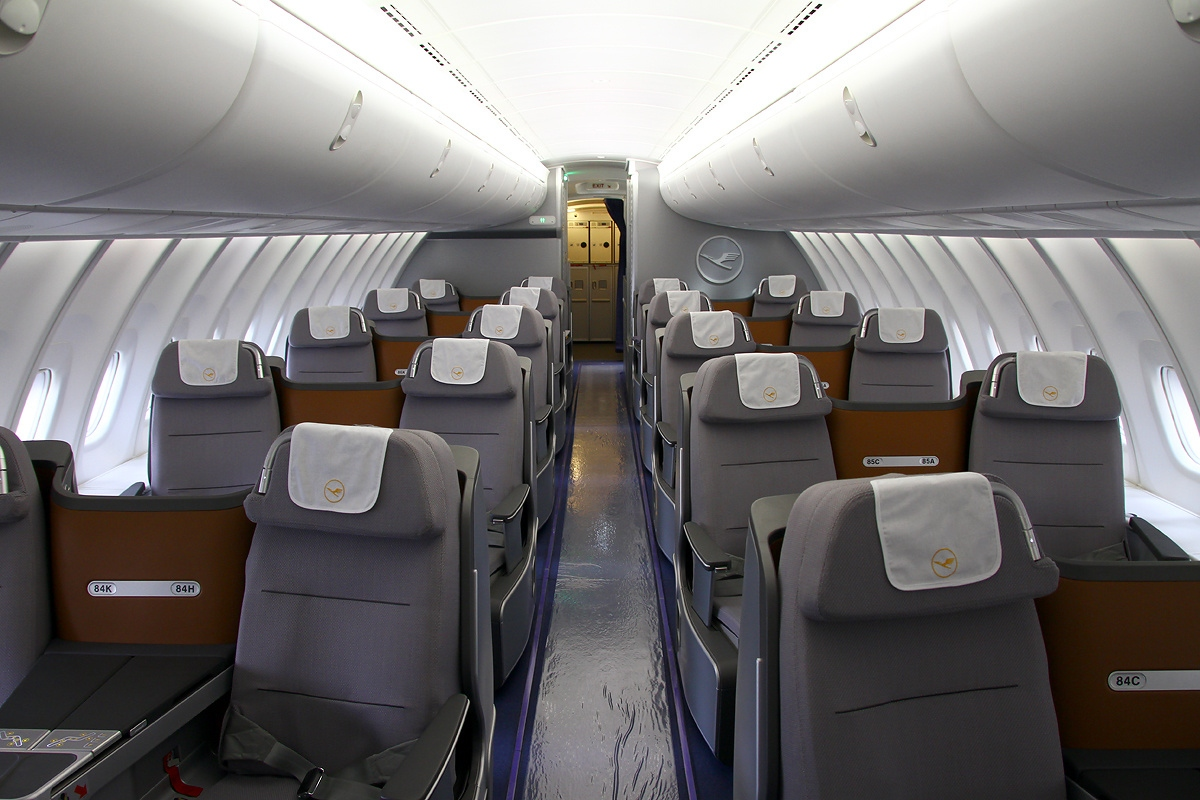
Business Class in a 2-2 layout on the upper deck of a Boeing 747-8I

Business Class is offered on all long-haul aircraft. Seats convert to 2 metres (6 ft 7 in) lie-flat beds and include laptop power outlets and entertainment facilities. Lufthansa offers dedicated Business Class check-in counters at all airports, as well as dedicated Business Class lounges at most airports, or contract lounges at other airports, as well as the Lufthansa Welcome Lounge upon arrival in Frankfurt. As of 2014, Business Class on all widebody aircraft features lie-flat seats. Lufthansa has released plans for a new business class set to be released in 2023 on the Boeing 787-9 and Airbus A350, and will retrofit the rest of the fleet in the coming years.

==== Premium Economy ====
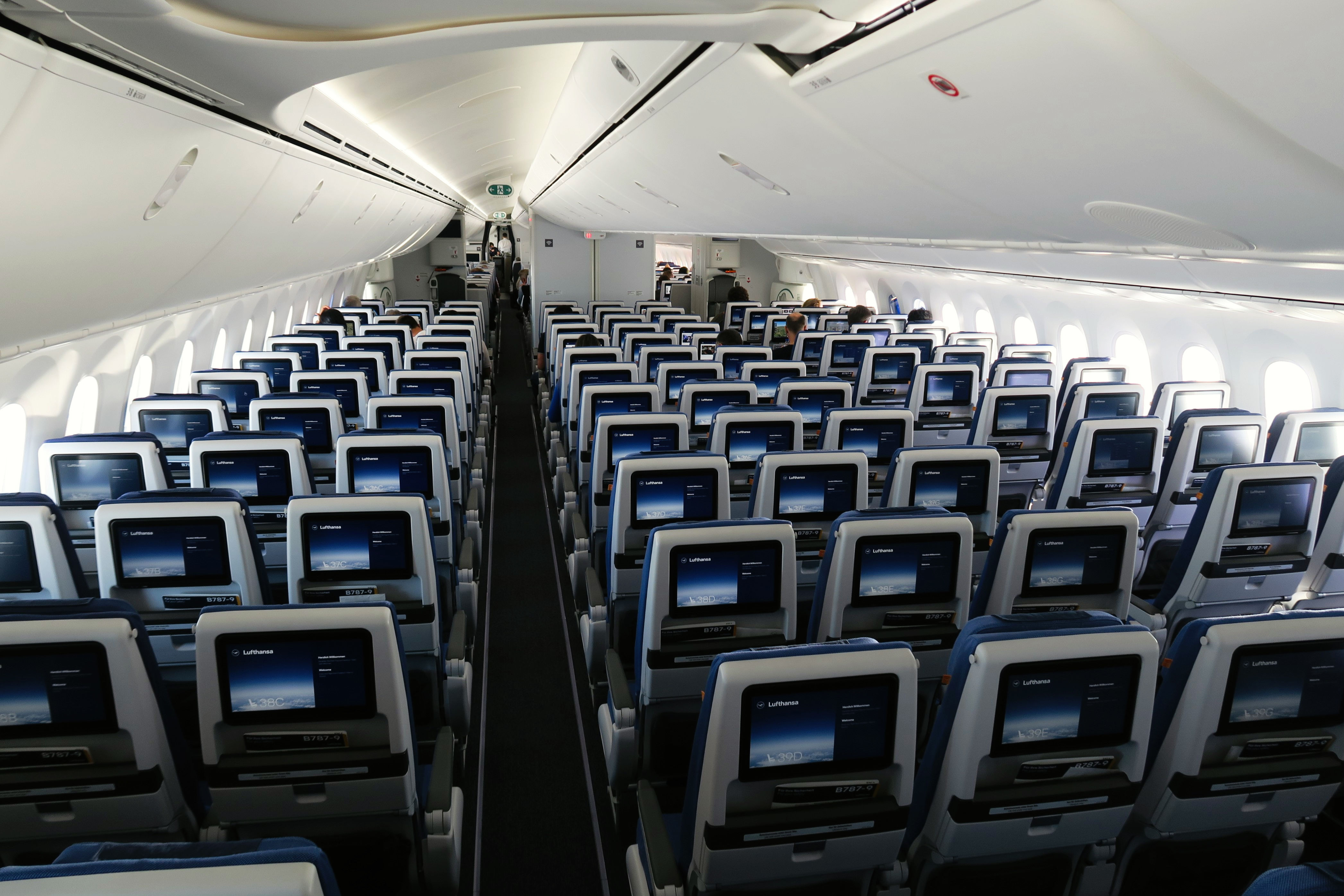
Economy Class aboard a Lufthansa Boeing 787-9

Introduced in 2014, Lufthansa's long-haul Premium Economy was rolled out on all long-haul aircraft, starting with some Boeing 747-8Is. Similar in design to Air Canada's Premium Economy or British Airways' World Traveller Plus cabins, Premium Economy features 38-inch (970 mm) pitch along with up to 3 inches (76 mm) more width than economy class, depending on the aircraft. The seats also feature a 11-or-12-inch (280 or 300 mm) personal seat-back entertainment screen and a larger armrest separating the seats. Along with the planned introduction of the Boeing 777-9X, the airline plans to add a new Premium Economy cabin with a "shell" design. These seats are also to be installed on SWISS' Boeing 777-300ERs and Airbus A340-300s from the first and second quarter of 2021, respectively.

=== Bus service ===
A bus service from Nuremberg Airport to Munich Airport was reinstated in 2021 to replace short-haul flights between the two cities. Lufthansa operated a check-in point in Nuremberg and a bus service from Nuremberg to Munich Airport in the late 1990s.

== Accidents and incidents ==
=== Fatal ===
- On 11 January 1959, Lufthansa Flight 502, a Lufthansa Lockheed Super Constellation (registered D-ALAK) crashed onto a beach shortly off Galeão Airport in Rio de Janeiro following a scheduled passenger flight from Hamburg, Germany. Of the 29 passengers and 10 crew members on board, only the co-pilot and two flight attendants survived. The investigation into the accident resulted in blaming the pilots for having executed a too low approach, which may have been caused by fatigue.
- On 4 December 1961, a Lufthansa Boeing 720 (registered D-ABOK) crashed of unknown causes near Mainz during a training flight from Frankfurt to Cologne, killing the three occupants. It was the first crash involving an aircraft of that type.
- On 15 July 1964, another Boeing 720 (registered D-ABOP) crashed during a training flight, with the three people, including Werner Baake, on board losing their lives (in what was only the second crash for this aircraft type). The accident occurred near Ansbach after the pilots had lost control of the aircraft when executing an aileron roll.
- On 28 January 1966 at 17:50 local time, Lufthansa Flight 005 from Frankfurt to Bremen, which was operated using a Convair CV-440 Metropolitan (registered D-ACAT), crashed 0.5 kilometres (0.31 mi) short of Bremen Airport, killing all 42 passengers and four crew members on board. The pilots had tried to execute a go-around when approaching the airport, during which the aircraft stalled and went out of control, possibly due to pilot error.
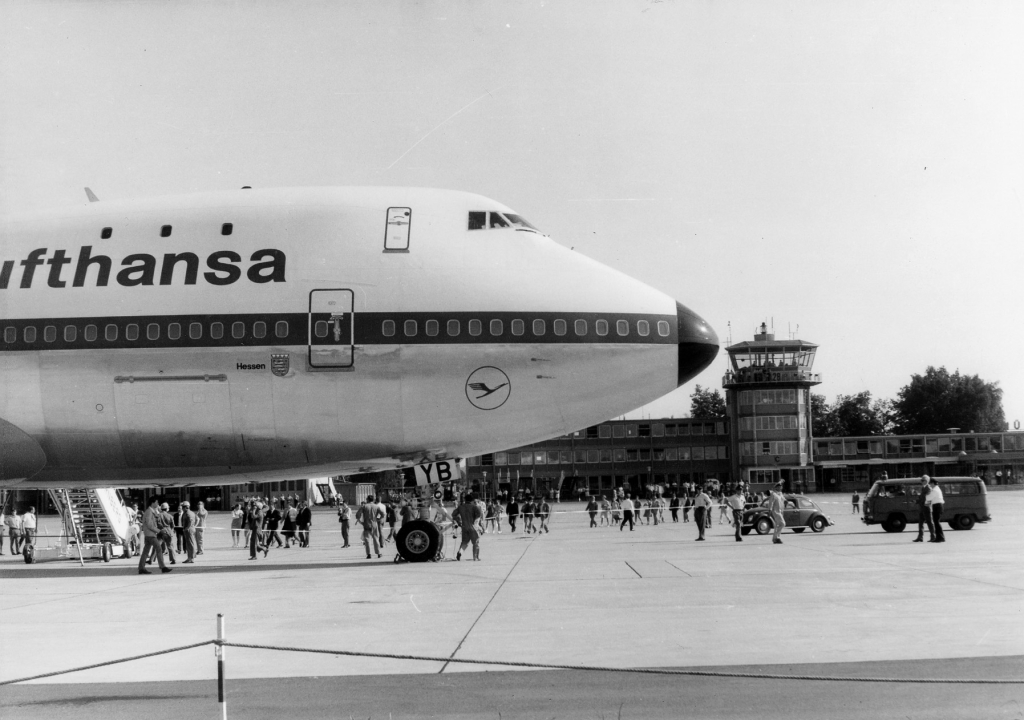
- D-ABYB, the aircraft that was destroyed in the Flight 540 accident. It is seen here during a promotional event at Nuremberg Airport in 1970.
  On 20 November 1974 at 07:54 local time, Lufthansa Flight 540, a Boeing 747-100 (registered D-ABYB), crashed shortly after take-off at Jomo Kenyatta International Airport in what was the first air accident involving a Boeing 747. A total of 55 out of the 140 passengers and four out of the 17 crew lost their lives, making it the worst accident in the history of the airline.
- On 26 July 1979 at 21:32 UTC, a cargo-configured Boeing 707 (registered D-ABUY) operating Lufthansa Flight 527 from Rio de Janeiro to Dakar and onwards to Germany crashed into a mountain 25 kilometres (16 mi) from Galeão Airport during initial climb, killing the three crew members on board. A flawed communication between the pilots and the air traffic controller had resulted in the aircraft flying on the wrong path.
- In January 1984, a woman was found dead in a suitcase which was lying on an LAX baggage carousel for a while. The suitcase had arrived on a Lufthansa flight. The woman was later discovered to have been an Iranian citizen who had recently married another Iranian with Green card status. She had been denied a US visa in West Germany and therefore decided to enter the US like this.
- On 14 September 1993, Lufthansa Flight 2904, an Airbus A320-200 (registered D-AIPN) flying from Frankfurt to Warsaw with 64 passengers and four crew members on board, overran the runway upon landing at Warsaw-Okecie Airport, and crashed into an earth embankment, resulting in the death of the co-pilot and one passenger.
- On 28 May 1999, German border police suffocated Aamir Ageeb to death, whom they were escorting aboard Lufthansa Flight 588 from Frankfurt to Cairo. During takeoff, the officers restrained and pinned down Ageeb, a Sudanese man deported from Germany after being rejected for asylum. The aircraft made an emergency landing in Munich. The incident led to the German interior ministry suspending its policy of forcible air deportation, and contributed to protests over Lufthansa's role in transporting deported asylum seekers.

=== Non-fatal ===
- On 20 December 1973 at 00:33 local time, a Lufthansa Boeing 707 (registered D-ABOT) with 98 passengers and 11 crew members on board collided with a middle marker shack upon approaching Palam Airport in Delhi following a scheduled passenger flight from Bangkok (as part of a multi-leg flight back to Germany). There were no injuries, but the aircraft was damaged beyond repair. Visibility was poor at the time of the accident.
- On 11 June 2018, one of the airline's Airbus A340-300s, registered as D-AIFA, was being towed to its departure gate at Frankfurt Airport when the towing vehicle caught fire. Despite the quick action of the airport fire brigade, the aircraft suffered substantial fire and smoke damage to the nose and flight deck. Six people were treated for smoke inhalation.

=== Hijackings and criminal events ===
- In 1972, there were four reported hijackings involving Lufthansa aircraft:
  - On 22 February, Flight 649, a Boeing 747-200 (registered D-ABYD) with 172 passengers and 15 crew members on board was hijacked en route from New Delhi to Athens (as part of a multi-leg flight from Tokyo to Frankfurt) by five Popular Front for the Liberation of Palestine terrorists who then pressed for a $5 million ransom from the German government. The aircraft landed at Aden International Airport, and the hostages were released on the following day once the demands of the perpetrators were accepted.
  - On 10 July, a similar hijacking attempt occurred on board a Lufthansa Boeing 737-100 during a flight from Cologne to Munich.
  - 11 October a Boeing 727 was hijacked on a flight from Lisbon to Frankfurt. Upon landing at Frankfurt Airport, the perpetrator tried to flee but was captured by police forces.
  - On 29 October, two men hijacked Flight 615 with 11 other passengers and seven crew members on board during a flight from Beirut to Ankara (and onwards to Germany), in order to liberate the three surviving members of the Black September group responsible for the Munich massacre. Whilst the hijacked Boeing 727 (registered D-ABIG) was forced to circle over Zagreb Airport in danger of eventual fuel starvation, the West German authorities decided to comply with the demands. The prisoners were handed over and the aircraft was allowed to be flown to Tripoli, where the hostages were released.
- On 17 December 1973, in the wake of the events surrounding Pan Am Flight 110, a parked Lufthansa Boeing 737-100 (registered D-ABEY) was hijacked at Leonardo da Vinci-Fiumicino Airport in Rome. Ten Italian hostages that had been taken by Palestinian terrorists at the airport were forced into the aircraft by five perpetrators, and the German crew (two pilots and two flight attendants) that was on board preparing the departure to Munich had to fly the aircraft instead first to Athens and then to several other airports until the ordeal ended at Kuwait International Airport the next day, where the hijackers surrendered.
- On 28 June 1977, a Lufthansa Boeing 727 was hijacked during a flight from Frankfurt to Istanbul and forced to divert to Munich.
- The hijacking of the Landshut occurred on 13 October 1977, at a time when West Germany had come under intense terroristic pressure known as German Autumn. The Boeing 737-200 (registered D-ABCE) was hijacked en route Flight 181 from Palma de Mallorca to Frankfurt by four terrorists of the Popular Front for the Liberation of Palestine, who thus wanted to force the German government to release several RAF terrorists. The crew had to divert the aircraft with 87 other passengers first to Rome, and then onwards to Larnaca, Bahrain, Dubai, Aden (where the captain was killed when he returned to the aircraft after negotiations with the local authorities), and finally to Mogadishu in an ordeal that took several days. At Mogadishu Airport, the German GSG 9 special forces stormed the aircraft in the early hours of 18 October local time, killing three terrorists and freeing all hostages.
- On 11 December 1978, Lufthansa was the victim of a major heist (robbery) at John F. Kennedy International Airport. The Lufthansa heist led to Lufthansa losing about US$5 million.
- On 12 September 1979, a hijacking attempt occurred on board a Lufthansa Boeing 727 on a flight from Frankfurt to Cologne, but the perpetrator quickly surrendered.
- Three hijackings occurred in due course in early 1985:
  - On 27 February, a Boeing 727 was hijacked en route a Lufthansa flight from Frankfurt to Damascus. Two perpetrators forced the pilots to divert the aircraft (with 35 other passengers on board) to Vienna International Airport, where they surrendered.
  - On 27 March, another 727 was hijacked, this time on a flight from Munich to Athens. A man demanded the pilots to divert to Libya. During a fuel stop at Istanbul, the aircraft was stormed and the perpetrator arrested.
  - Only two days later, a mentally ill person on board a Lufthansa Boeing 737-200 on a flight from Hamburg to London demanded to be taken to Hawaii instead.
- On 11 February 1993, Lufthansa Flight 592 from Frankfurt to Addis Ababa via Cairo with 94 passengers and 10 crew members was hijacked during the first leg by 20-year-old Nebiu Zewolde Demeke, who forced the pilots to divert the Airbus A310 (registered D-AIDM) to the United States, with the intent of securing the right of asylum there. Demeke, who had been on the flight to be deported back to his native Ethiopia, surrendered to authorities upon arrival at John F. Kennedy International Airport in New York City. No passengers or crew members were harmed during the 12-hour ordeal.

== Customer issues ==
=== Barring of visibly Jewish passengers ===
In May 2022, during a New York to Frankfurt flight, the captain alerted Lufthansa security that some passengers had failed to follow crew instructions requiring the wearing of masks and barring gatherings. The company then barred over a hundred visibly Jewish passengers from the flight from boarding a connecting flight to Budapest. The majority were rebooked on other flights the same day. In August 2022, as a result of the incident, Lufthansa adopted the IHRA Working Definition of Antisemitism and appointed a senior manager with responsibility for preventing antisemitism and other discrimination. In October 2024, Lufthansa paid a US Department of Transportation penalty of $4M in relation to the episode, less the $2M it had already paid to passengers in a legal settlement. Lufthansa said it made the payment to avoid litigation but denied discrimination, blaming the incident on "an unfortunate series of inaccurate communications".

== See also ==
- Air transport in Germany
- List of airlines of Germany

== Bibliography ==
- Wigton, D.C. (1963). From Jenny to jet. Los Angeles (CA.): Floyd Clymer Publications.
- Wachtel, J. (1980). The Lufthansa story. Köln.
- Davies, R.E.G. (1991). Lufthansa-An airline and its aircraft. Airlife & Orion Books.
- Hooks, M. (1999). Lufthansa. Strout (Gloucestershire): Tempus Publishing Ltd. "Images of Aviation" series.
- Neulen, Hans-Werner (June 2001). "Une grue dans la tempête, Lufthansa dans les années 1939/1945" [A Crane in the Storm, Lufthansa in the Years 1939/1945]. Avions: Toute l'Aéronautique et son histoire (in French) (99): 30–40. ISSN 1243-8650.
- Neulen, Hans-Werner (January 2002). "Une grue dans la tempête, Lufthansa dans les années 1939/1945". Avions: Toute l'Aéronautique et son histoire (in French) (106): 14–26. ISSN 1243-8650.
- Neulen, Hans-Werner (February 2002). "Une grue dans la tempête, la Lufthansa en guerre: 1941" [A Crane in the Storm, Lufthansa at war: 1941]. Avions: Toute l'Aéronautique et son histoire (in French) (107): 39–51. ISSN 1243-8650.
- Neulen, Hans-Werner (June 2003). "Une grue dans la tempête, la Lufthansa en guerre: VI: 1944, l'année des accidents et des pertes" [A Crane in the Storm, Lufthansa at war: VI: 1944, a Year of Accidents and Losses]. Avions: Toute l'aéronautique et son histoire (in French) (123): 34–49. ISSN 1243-8650.
- Neulen, Hans-Werner (August 2003). "Une grue dans la tempête, la Lufthansa en guerre: VII: 1945, jusqu'à la fin amère" [A Crane in the Storm, Lufthansa at war: VII: 1945, Until the Bitter End]. Avions: Toute l'aéronautique et son histoire (in French) (125): 34–44. ISSN 1243-8650.
