= Global Load Control =

Remote aviation services company

- Type: Subsidiary
- Industry: Aviation
- Founded: 2004; 22 years ago
- Headquarters: Cape Town, South Africa
- Area served: Worldwide
- Services: Load control for airlines
- Number of employees: 260
- Parent: Lufthansa Group
- Website: globalloadcontrol.com

Global Load Control (GLC) is a South African subsidiary of the German-based Lufthansa Group, and was established in Cape Town in 2004. The company provides remote weight and balance and load control services to its parent company Lufthansa, as well as other airlines.

GLC operates from its three centers in Cape Town, Brno and Istanbul. These three centers handle more than 140 Lufthansa stations and process some 1800 flights a day.

Global Load Control's operations center in Cape Town became Lufthansa's first load control center outside of Germany. Before this, Lufthansa maintained two centralized load control centers in Munich and Frankfurt.

== History ==
- 2004: Global Load Control founded by Lufthansa in Cape Town, South Africa
- 2007: Second operations center established in Brno, Czech Republic
- 2009: Third operations center established in Istanbul, Turkey

== Controversy ==
Lufthansa's decision to open a centralized load control center outside of Germany was unpopular with Lufthansa load controllers based in Frankfurt and Munich as they feared the loss of their jobs. Union involvement for a time prevented long haul flights departing from Germany to be processed by the new load control center in Cape Town.

Lufthansa's move to outsource its load controlling needs to its centers in Cape Town, Istanbul and Brno where motivated by more affordable operations costs. The cost of processing flights outside of Germany are around 30 percent cheaper. Another motivating factor that influenced Lufthansa to outsource its load controlling to Cape Town, Brno and Istanbul was due to the high number of German expatriates and local inhabitants with a good knowledge of German living in these cities.

In 2008 concerns were raised as to the quality of work the Global Load Control center in Cape Town was able to deliver, with one client airline calling for Lufthansa's load control operations for Frankfurt airport to be moved back to Frankfurt. In response to this criticism, Lufthansa has stated that a move towards remote centralized load controlling and from manual loadsheets to electronic loadsheets was in the airlines best interest, and that steps have been taken to address the concerns about quality.

Since then, Global Load Control has received its Dekra ISO 9001:2008 certification, and states on its corporate website that it is committed to ...producing a quality service by focusing on the principles of safety, punctuality and economy..., and that its quality management systems are continually reviewed and improved.
