= Aamir Ageeb =

Sudanese civilian killed resisting deportation

Amir Ageeb or Aamir Ageeb (c. 1968 or 1969 – 28 May 1999) was a Sudanese who was killed while resisting deportation from Germany, leading to a lawsuit against the involved officers.

At Frankfurt Airport, Ageeb physically resisted the three Bundesgrenzschutz officers who escorted him onto Lufthansa Flight 588 travelling to Sudan on 28 May 1999. They restrained him with several ropes, handcuffs and bands; put a helmet on his head; leaned on his chest; and pushed his head between his knees, apparently all in accordance with procedures in use at the time. Ageeb suffocated and was found to be dead shortly after the aircraft took off.

The three officers were charged with voluntary manslaughter (German: Körperverletzung mit Todesfolge, literally 'bodily harm with fatality') and found responsible for the death. Instead of the minimum sentence of one year, Judge Heinrik Gehrke imposed nine months probation, in order to avoid the officers losing their right to work in civil service. with a fine paid to the family of Aamir Ageeb of €2,000 each. Gehrke criticised the policies of the asylum policy, comparing treatment of asylum seekers to that of the inmates at Abu Ghraib prison.

As a result, deportation procedures for Bundesgrenzschutz officers were changed, different helmets used, and deportations became more frequently suspended, especially in cases of violent resistance.

The incident contributed to protests against Lufthansa's role in air deportations.
