= Lufthansa Consulting =

- Company type: Private Limited Company
- Founded: 1988
- Headquarters: Frankfurt am Main, Germany
- Number of employees: ca. 120
- Parent: Lufthansa Group
- Website: lhconsulting.com

Lufthansa Consulting is an international aviation and management consultancy serving airlines, airports, air service providers, and related infrastructure organizations. The company is an independent subsidiary of the Lufthansa Group and provides consulting services tailored to the aviation and broader air transportation sectors. Its service portfolio includes strategy development, operational optimization, financial restructuring, digital transformation, as well as improvements in maintenance, fleet management, and customer experience. Lufthansa Consulting maintains offices at Frankfurt Airport, Germany, and in São Paulo, Brazil.

According to the German business magazine brand eins, Lufthansa Consulting was ranked among Germany's top consulting firms for the tenth consecutive year in 2025.

== History ==
=== Foundation ===
Lufthansa Consulting originated in 1976 as the internal consulting department of Lufthansa providing strategic and operational advisory services within Lufthansa AG. In 1988, the unit was transformed into a separate legal entity (GmbH).

In the 1990s the company expanded its services to the external aviation industry. During this period Lufthansa Consulting developed dedicated services for aviation restructuring, privatization, and airport infrastructure development. Following this expansion, the company also undertook projects in the broader transportation sector, including work with railway companies.

=== Since 2000 ===
From 2000 Lufthansa Consulting further specialized in aviation management consulting, supporting several Lufthansa Group initiatives such as the A380 entry-into-service program and the FlyNet project, while expanding its international presence

In 2012, Andreas Jahnke was appointed Managing Director and initiated the reorganization into regional focus areas including services for the Lufthansa Group The company also broadened its activities to include inter-branch services for non-aviation industries such as transport and logistics companies, railways and bus line operators.

Lufthansa Consulting also engaged in technology projects with Unmanned Aerial Vehicles, notably collaborating with Phase One Industrial in 2017 to develop UAV-based aerial imaging solutions for industrial inspections.

=== Since 2020 ===
In 2020, Hannes Müller joined the Lufthansa Consulting Management Board as Managing Director. Under his leadership, Lufthansa Consulting has aimed at expanding its aviation-focused management consulting business both internally within the Lufthansa Group and externally in the global competitive market. The company explored opportunities related to the digitalization of customer interfaces, processes, and business models.

Lufthansa Consulting experienced significant growth. The company has attracted talented employees from leading universities, top consulting firms, and the aviation industry. By the end of 2025, Lufthansa Consulting employs over 120 staff members.

Lufthansa Consulting has collaborated with leading organizations in the aviation sector such as the German Aerospace Center (DLR) to develop practical applications from new technologies, and since 2023, it has worked with the Center for Aviation and Space Competence (CFAC) at the University of St. Gallen to promote knowledge exchange and joint research on airline strategies and business models. It is also part of the Inhouse Consulting Network (ICN).

=== Services ===
Lufthansa Consulting's project portfolio covers a wide range of consulting services including restructuring and efficiency programs, operational optimization, airline start-ups, post-merger integrations, flight safety and maintenance improvements, as well as network, fleet management, and commercial strategy development. The company supports in-house consulting services to entities within the Lufthansa Group and in addition to its external client base.

The company operates in a highly specialized and competitive market. Its main competitors include global consultancies such as McKinsey & Company, Oliver Wyman, Bain & Company, and Roland Berger, along with specialized aviation-focused firms. Lufthansa Consulting is characterized by its direct industry affiliation with the Lufthansa Group and its longstanding aviation-specific consulting expertise.

=== Awards and Recognition ===
Lufthansa Consulting has been repeatedly recognized for its industry expertise and project delivery. Since 2016, the company has been featured annually in the brand eins "Best Consultants" ranking, achieving top positions in the categories Aerospace & Defense and Transportation, Traffic & Logistics. In 2025, Lufthansa Consulting received the highest possible rating in the Transportation, Traffic & Logistics category.

In 2023, the company received a "Best of Consulting" award from the German business magazine WirtschaftsWoche in the Strategy category for its work with TAAG Angola Airlines.

Lufthansa Consulting is also regularly invited to speak at major international industry events, such as Routes World and the Global Airport Development (GAD) conferences, underlining its experience and thought leadership in the aviation sector.

Furthermore, Lufthansa Consulting has been honored by the Süddeutsche Zeitung as best medium-sized consulting firm in Germany. In the 2024 evaluation, the company ranked first among 130 firms, highlighting its strong client orientation and implementation focus.
