= Lufthansa Systems =

Information technology service provider for the aviation industry

- Company type: GmbH (public)
- Industry: Information technology
- Founded: January 1, 1995
- Headquarters: Raunheim, Germany
- Key people: Stefanie Neumann (CEO)
- Number of employees: 2,800 (February 2023)
- Parent: Lufthansa Group
- Website: lhsystems.com

Lufthansa Systems GmbH & Co. KG is an information technology service provider for the aviation industry owned by the Lufthansa Group. It has around 2,800 employees in several locations in Germany and offices in 16 other countries. The company is headquartered in Raunheim near Frankfurt. The company's portfolio includes "consulting, development and implementation of customized industry solutions as well as the operation of applications in the company's own data centers." The Hungarian subsidiary, Lufthansa Systems Hungária Kft., was established in 1995, and employed 200 people as of 2005.

== History ==
In 2013, Lufthansa Systems AG, with around 2,700 employees worldwide, achieved annual sales of 640 million euros, of which 265 million euros came from outside the Lufthansa Group.

In March 2015, Lufthansa Systems undertook a reorganization to reform into three operating units: Infrastructure, Airline Solutions (now known as "Lufthansa Systems") and Industry Solutions (now "Lufthansa Industry Solutions"). The Infrastructure unit, which employs about 1,400 people, has been sold to IBM, while the other two units were meant to remain as subsidiaries of the parent company Lufthansa.

In November 2017, Lufthansa Systems GmbH & Co. KG began moving to a newly built headquarters in the Airport Garden business park in Raunheim, near Frankfurt Airport.
