= Lufthansa Cargo Flight 527 =

1979 aviation accident

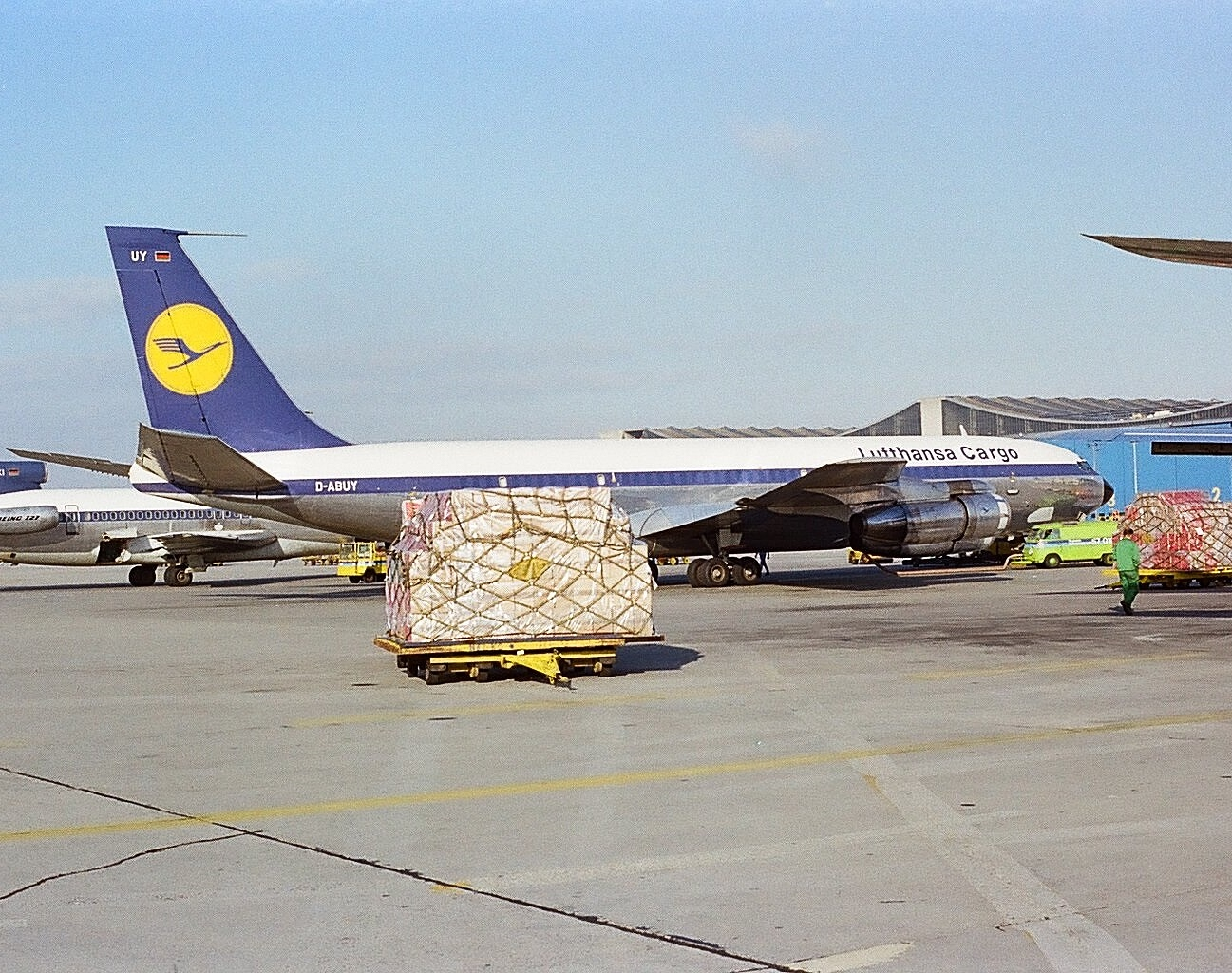
- D-ABUY, the aircraft involved in the accident seen in September 1978

Accident
- Date: 26 July 1979
- Summary: Controlled flight into terrain due to ATC error and pilot error
- Site: 25 kilometres (16 mi; 13 nmi) north of Rio de Janeiro/Galeão International Airport, Rio de Janeiro, Brazil; 22°34′58″S 43°12′57″W

Aircraft
- Aircraft type: Boeing 707-330C
- Operator: Lufthansa Cargo
- IATA flight No.: LH527
- ICAO flight No.: GEC527
- Call sign: LUFTHANSA CARGO 527
- Registration: D-ABUY
- Flight origin: Rio de Janeiro/Galeão International Airport, Rio de Janeiro, Brazil
- Destination: Dakar-Yoff International Airport, Dakar, Senegal
- Occupants: 3
- Passengers: 0
- Crew: 3
- Fatalities: 3
- Survivors: 0

Lufthansa Cargo Flight 527 was a Lufthansa Cargo flight scheduled to fly from Rio de Janeiro in Brazil to Dakar, the capital of Senegal. On 26 July 1979, shortly after take-off in Rio, the Boeing 707 flew into a slope and crashed. All 3 crew members, consisting of the captain, the first officer, and a flight engineer died; there were no survivors. The principal cause of the crash was the failure of air traffic controllers to pay the necessary attention to each aircraft and ensure the necessary attention to rising terrain.

== Accident ==
The aircraft was a cargo variant of the Boeing 707 (707-330C). Flight 527 departed Rio de Janeiro/Galeão International Airport at 21:27 UTC and was instructed by air traffic control (ATC) to climb to 2,000 feet (610 m) and to turn toward the Caxias VHF omnidirectional range (VOR). Approach control requested the pilot to increase their speed. The crew increased the aircraft's speed to 304 knots (563 km/h; 350 mph) as instructed despite the maximum speed being 250 knots (460 km/h; 290 mph) when the altitude is less than 10,000 feet (3,000 m). After communicating his instructions, the controller monitoring Flight 527 turned to focus on other flights near Rio, and was unaware of Flight 527 overspeeding.

By the time the controller resumed communications with Flight 527, he saw that the flight was further north than expected due to its greater speed. He then radioed the crew: "Lufthansa, turn right heading 140, just now, over. Lufthansa 527, turn right heading 140 and climb without restrictions." The crew responded: "Roger, leaving 2 thousand, LH 527, turning right heading 140."

Shortly after this transmission, the Ground Proximity Warning System (GPWS) activated and at 21:32 UTC the aircraft flew against a bunch of trees and crashed into a mountain, leaving a trail of debris 800 metres (2,600 ft) long.

== Investigation ==
The main cause was found to be the failure of Brazilian air traffic controllers to pay the necessary attention to each aircraft and thus both stagger the aircraft among themselves and ensure the necessary distances to rising terrain.

The improperly high speed of the Boeing 707 was both due to faulty instructions and monitoring by the controller, as well as the crew passively accepting the dangerous instructions. Normally, the release includes a departure route to a so-called clearance limit, up to which the aircraft is allowed to fly at most. Even when asked by the pilots, air traffic control gave only an unclear answer. In the clearance for LH527 this information was missing, so the crew continued to fly on the set course instead of asking air traffic control for new instructions. For almost all of the last two minutes, there was no communication between LH527 and air traffic control.

== See also ==
- Prinair Flight 277
