= Lufthansa (disambiguation) =

Lufthansa may refer to the following:

== Airlines and related firms ==
- Deutsche Luft Hansa, former national airline of Germany (1926–1945)
- Deutsche Lufthansa, former national airline of East Germany (1955–1963)
- Lufthansa, the current German flag carrier airline founded in 1953.
  - Lufthansa Cargo, a German cargo airline and wholly owned subsidiary.
  - Lufthansa Consulting, a subsidiary providing consulting services to the aviation industry.
  - Lufthansa Flight Training, a subsidiary that trains Lufthansa pilots.
  - Lufthansa Italia, former Italian airline and wholly owned subsidiary (2009–2011)
  - Lufthansa Regional, brand name for two regional airlines owned by Lufthansa.
    - Lufthansa CityLine, one of the regional partner airlines.
  - Lufthansa Systems, an information technology service provider for the aviation industry.
  - Lufthansa Technik, a group of 32 companies providing aircraft services.
  - Team Lufthansa, former name of Lufthansa Regional (1996–2004)
- Lufthansa Airport Express, a former train service to Frankfurt airport (1982–1993)

== Places ==
- Lufthansa Center, a building complex in Beijing, China.

== Sports ==
- Lufthansa Cup, former name of the German Open (WTA) (1989–1992)
- Lufthansa SG Berlin, former football club of Lufthansa employees (1931–1945)
