= Bayreuth Airport =

Airport in Bavaria, Germany

Bayreuth Airport Verkehrslandeplatz Bayreuth
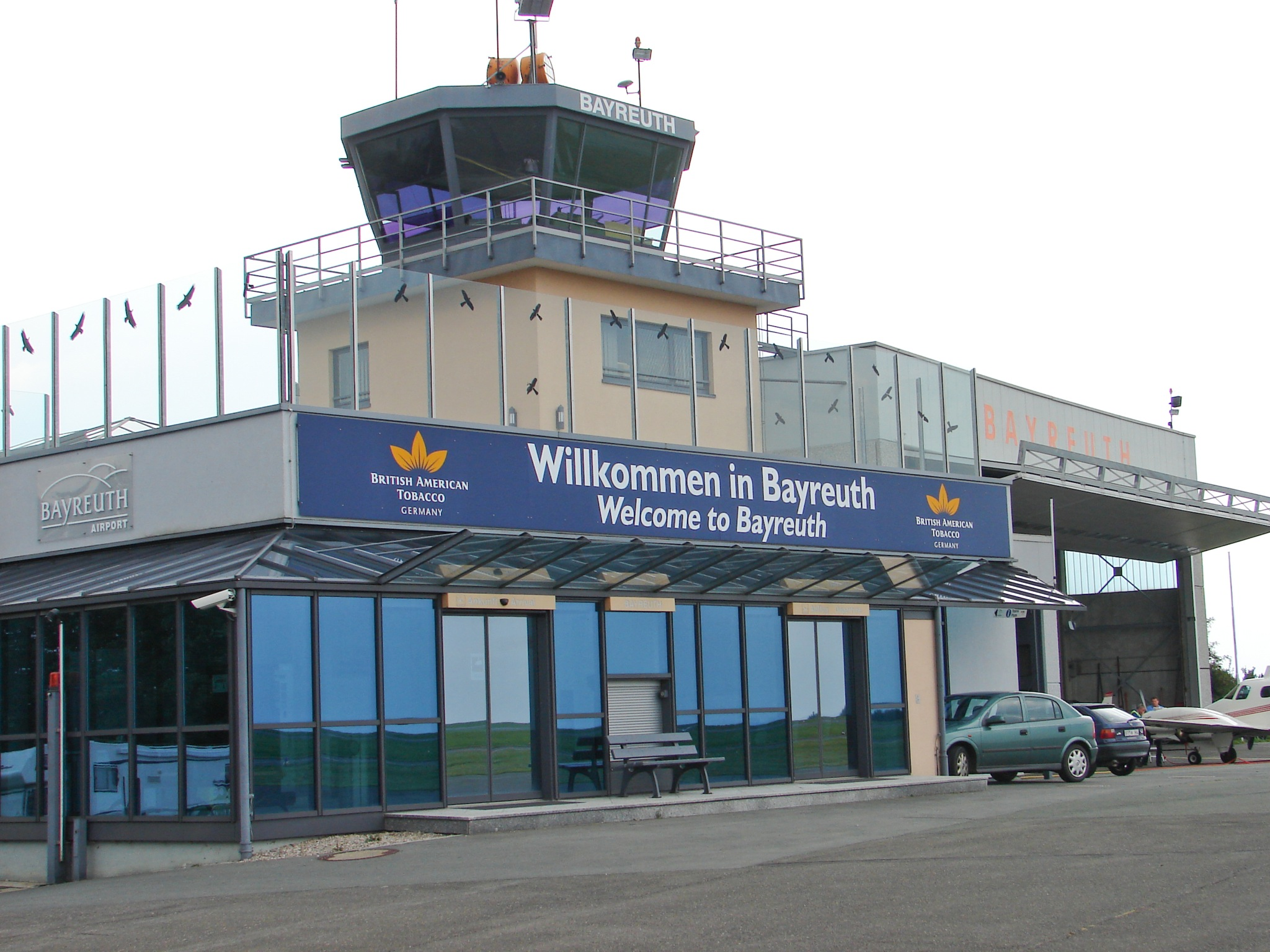
- IATA: BYU; ICAO: EDQD

Summary
- Airport type: Public
- Owner/Operator: City of Bayreuth
- Serves: Bayreuth, Germany
- Location: Bindlach/Goldkronach, Germany
- Elevation AMSL: 488 m (1,601 ft)
- Coordinates: 49°59′08″N 11°38′24″E
- Website: bayreuth.de/flugplatz
- Interactive map of Bayreuth Airport

Runways
Direction	Length		Surface
Direction	m	ft	Surface
06/24	1,034	3,392	Asphalt
S1 (06/24)	1,100	3,809	Grass
S2 (06/24)	900	2,953	Grass
S3 (06/24)	800	2,625	Grass
- Source: Airport website. AIP at German air traffic control.

Bayreuth Airport (IATA: BYU, ICAO: EDQD), also called Verkehrslandeplatz Bayreuth in German, is a general-aviation non-towered airport serving the city of Bayreuth, Germany. It was formerly known as Bindlacher Berg Airport.

== Location ==
The airfield is located on a plateau (the so-called Bindlacher Berg) in Bindlach 6.3 km (3,9 miles, 3.4 nm) northeast of the city centre of Bayreuth, close to the interchange of German motorways A9 and A70. Public transport to Bayreuth is provided by Verkehrsverbund Großraum Nürnberg (VGN) with busses.

== Facilities ==
The airport's main runway (06/24) is suitable for planes weighing up to 5,700 kg (up to 10,000 kg). It is equipped with PAPI lights and satellite-based RNAV procedures. In addition, there are three parallel grass runways (S1 through S3) for gliders. Several hangars, refuelling with Avgas 100LL or Jet A-1, and special firefighting vehicles are available. In addition, the airport features a small terminal building and a tower.

== History ==
Before World War II, another aerodrome, closer to the city, served Bayreuth.

The area where the current airport is located was first used for a gliding competition in 1930. In the 1930s, the German Luftwaffe constructed an airbase in that location. However, on Adolf Hitler's personal request, no combat units were garrisoned in Bayreuth. Instead, the airbase was used for training purposes. In April 1945, the airfield was bombed and conquered by the United States Armed Forces. The U.S. Army established a sizeable garrison, Christensen Barracks, within the perimeters of the former airbase, which existed until 1992.

After the end of the war, the Luftsportgemeinschaft Bayreuth (which translates to aero sports club) was formed. In 1953, it was granted a permit to create a small airstrip in the southeastern area of the former airbase.

In 1973, the City of Bayreuth took over operations of the airfield. In the following years, the airfield was reclassified as Verkehrslandeplatz (regional airfield) and upgraded with additional buildings; this also marked the commencement of scheduled connections to Frankfurt Airport. By 1979, a control zone and IFR procedures had been established.

In 1982, the German gliding championship contest took place in Bayreuth. That same year, runway 06/24 was extended to 1055 m x 30 m.

Four years later, the City of Bayreuth purchased the (hitherto only leased) grounds of the airport from the federal government of Germany. In 1992, runwas 06/24 was extended to a length of 1,206 m. In 1995, the City of Bayreuth purchased additional land to the north of the existing airport, extending the airport's area to 55.511 ha and allowing for the construction of additional runways for gliders.

Bayreuth Airport hosted the World Gliding championship in 1999.

Since the last scheduled connection was discontinued in 2001, parts of the infrastructure have been dismantled. In particular, the airspace around the airport was redesignated to (then class F, later) class G from D, IFR procedures now rely on RNAV based on satellite navigation.

== Airlines and destinations ==
Bayreuth no longer sees any scheduled or chartered commercial flight operations.

In the 1960s, there were limited scheduled flights to/from Frankfurt Airport for passengers attending the Bayreuth Festival. For these flights, Dornier Do 28 were operated. Owing to lack of demand, this service was discontinued in 1965.

From 1973 to 1998, regular flights to Frankfurt and Hof–Plauen Airport were operated on De Havilland Canada DHC-6 Twin Otters. Also, for a short period of time, scheduled flights to Düsseldorf Airport were offered. Starting in 1986, Nürnberger Flugdienst (now Eurowings) took over the flights on the line Hof-Bayreuth-Frankfurt, where it operated Dornier 228, ATR 42 and ATR 72. From 1998 to 2001, this route was served by Augsburg Airways as part of the Team Lufthansa franchise. Since those flights ended, Bayreuth has been left without any commercial air traffic.

== See also ==
- Transport in Germany
- List of airports in Germany
