= Zschorgula =

Coordinates: 51°20′N 11°52′E

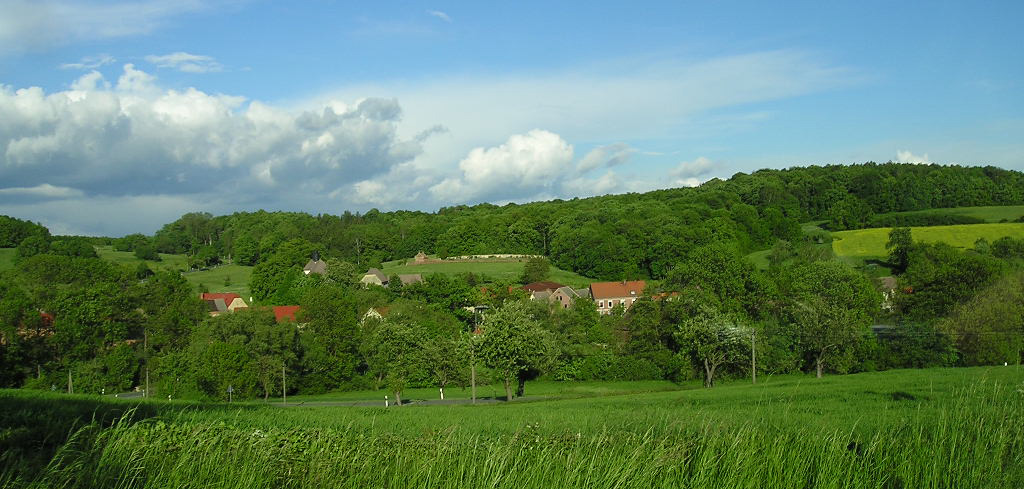
Zschorgula in spring

Zschorgula is part of the small village Schkölen located in the province of Thuringia in East Germany. It has a population of about 80.

The village is surrounded by farms and hills. There is a church in the village.

The closest airport is AOC - Altenburg Nobitz, located 45.5 km east of Zschorgula. More nearby airports include LEJ - Leipzig Halle 50.0 km north east, ERF - Erfurt 64.2 km west, HOQ - Hof Plauen 84.7 km south, BYU - Bayreuth 119.6 km south,
