= Augsburg Airways =

German regional airline

Coordinates: 48.331487°N 11.736998°E

- Bombardier Dash 8 in Lufthansa Regional livery
IATA	ICAO	Call sign
IQ; LH	AUB; DLH	AUGSBURG-AIR; LUFTHANSA
- Founded: 1980; 46 years ago
- Ceased operations: 2013; 13 years ago
- Hubs: Augsburg Airport (1986-2002); Munich Airport (1996-2013)
- Alliance: Team Lufthansa (1996-2004); Lufthansa Regional (2004-2013)
- Headquarters: Augsburg (1980-2008); Hallbergmoos(2008-2013)

Augsburg Airways was a German regional airline. A member of Team Lufthansa and its successor Lufthansa Regional, it operated feeder services at Munich Airport on behalf of Lufthansa.

== History ==
Company logo of Augsburg Airways that was used prior to the acquisition by Cirrus Group.

Augsburg Airways logo used as a Lufthansa partner.

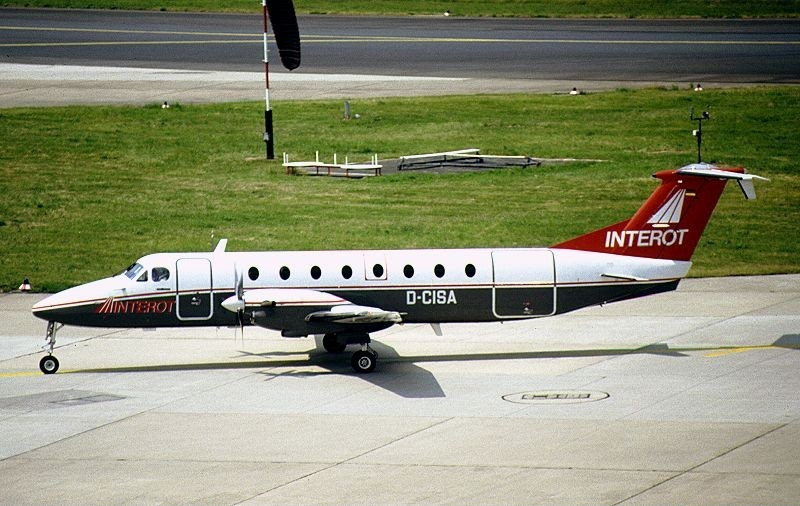
A Beechcraft 1900 of Interot Airways (1990).

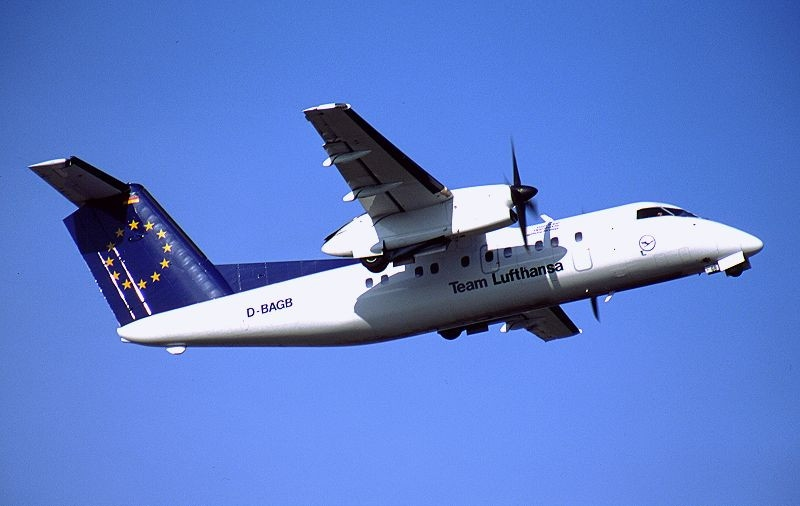
An Augsburg Airways Bombardier Dash 8-100 in Team Lufthansa livery (1999).

=== Early years ===
The company was founded in 1980 as Interot Airways, offering corporate flight services out of Augsburg Airport on behalf of its then owner Haindl Papier, a large (West) German paper manufacturer.

In 1986, Interot Airways commenced scheduled passenger flights on the Augsburg–Düsseldorf route, using its then two Beechcraft Super King Air. In 1987, three Beechcraft 1900 were ordered, and the fleet was further expanded following an order for three aircraft of the larger Dash 8-100, which were delivered in 1991–92. By then, the domestic route network at Augsburg Airport had grown to include Berlin, Cologne, Dresden, Hamburg and Leipzig so that Interot Airways was considered an alternative for business travellers who wished to avoid busy Munich Airport.

In 1994, Interot launched its first international route (to Florence), which was followed by flights to Birmingham and London City Airport in 1995. In 1996, the airline went into a cooperation with Lufthansa, becoming the first franchise partner of the Team Lufthansa brand, which coincided with being renamed Augsburg Airways. On 27 October of that year, flights from Munich to Dortmund, Erfurt (both of which had previously not been served by Lufthansa) and Leipzig were commenced. In December, Augsburg Airways sold its last remaining Beechcraft 1900, thus becoming an exclusive operator of the Dash 8.

=== Cooperation with Lufthansa ===
By 2000, Air Littoral, Cimber Air, Contact Air and Rheintalflug had joined Team Lufthansa, and Augsburg Airways operated a network of 30 domestic and European destinations including Bayreuth, Elba, Frankfurt, London, Newcastle, Paderborn, Prague and Strasbourg. On 1 June 2002, Augsburg Airways terminated its last routes from Augsburg Airport, and handed over control of its scheduling, sales, and marketing operations to Lufthansa, which was considered "necessary for the carrier's survival." Routes from Augsburg Airport where briefly taken over by Denim Airways. In 2004, Lufthansa reorganized its regional franchise partners under the Lufthansa Regional brand, of which Augsburg Airways became a member along with Air Dolomiti, Contact Air, Eurowings and Lufthansa CityLine.

In the same year, Augsburg Airways was acquired by Cirrus Group (the owner of Cirrus Airlines), which was restructured as Aton GmbH in 2008, and the airline subsequently relocated its headquarters to Hallbergmoos. In 2009, the Embraer E-Jet joined the fleet, the only jet airliner type operated by Augsburg Airways. (In 2000, the acquisition of the Bombardier CRJ200, Embraer ERJ 135 or Fairchild Dornier 328JET had been evaluated, but no order was placed).

=== Closure ===
On 26 October 2012, Lufthansa announced that it would terminate its contract with Augsburg Airways (which by then served 35 destinations from Munich Airport with its fleet of 15 aircraft) at the end of the 2013 summer season. In a similar manner, the cooperation with Contact Air had ended one year earlier. The last flight by Augsburg Airways under the Lufthansa Regional brand took place on 26 October 2013, and the company with its then 450 employees was subsequently shut down on 31 October. Consequently, its Embraer fleet was transferred to Lufthansa CityLine, while the Bombardier Q400 fleet was returned to lessors and stored at Maastricht Airport.

== Destinations ==
Until closing down, Augsburg Airways operated 36 destinations for Lufthansa Regional, among them Graz, Zagreb, Gothenburg, Dresden, Warsaw and Prague. Some of Augsburg Airways' aircraft were also available for charter flights, when they were not employed on the network.

== Fleet ==
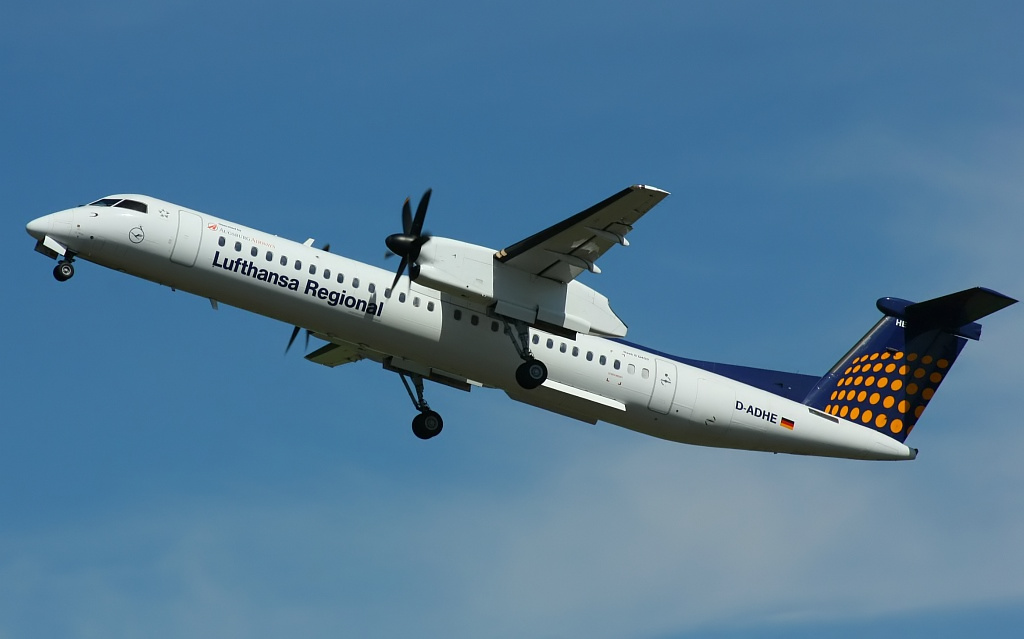
An Augsburg Airways Bombardier Dash-8 Q400 in Lufthansa Regional livery (2011).

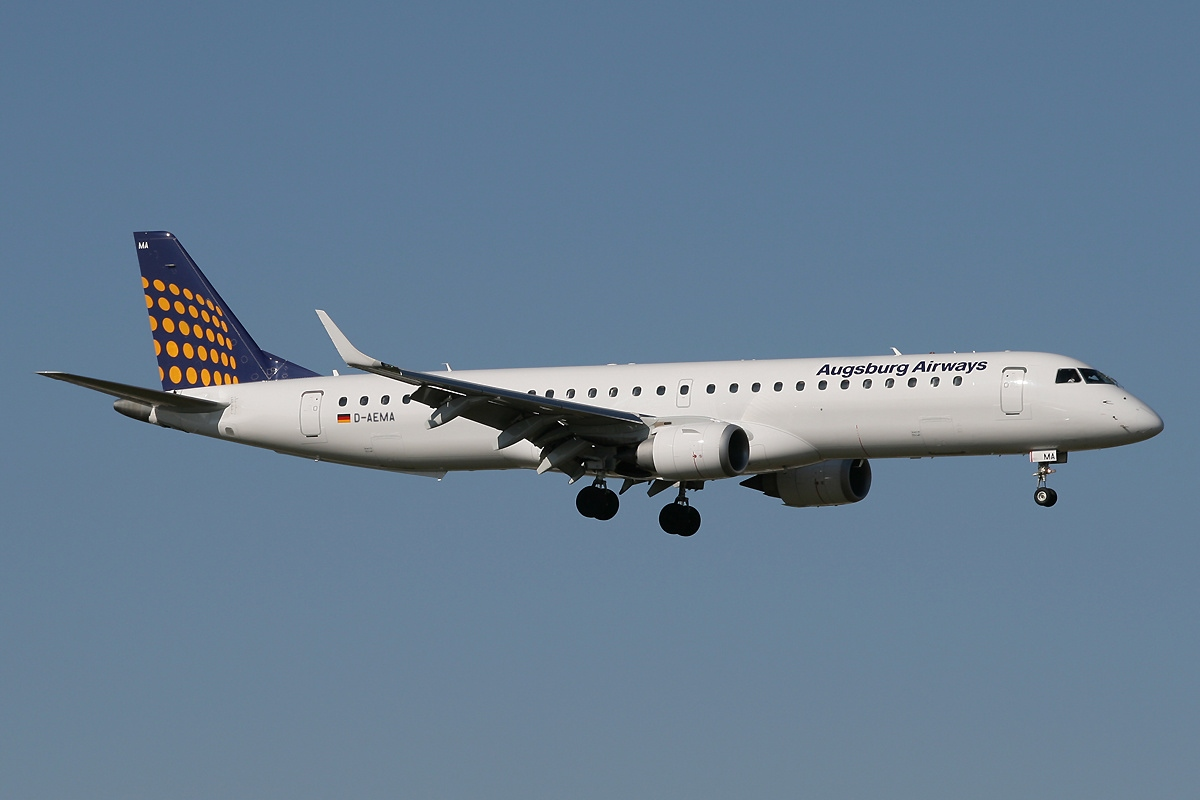
An Augsburg Airways Embraer 190 in Lufthansa Regional livery (2005).

Over the years, the following aircraft types were operated:

Aircraft	Subtypes	Introduced	Retired
Beechcraft Super King Air		1986	199?
Beechcraft 1900		1987	1996
Bombardier Dash 8	Dash 8-400	2000	2013
