= Augsburg Airport =

Airport in Germany

Augsburg Airport Flughafen Augsburg
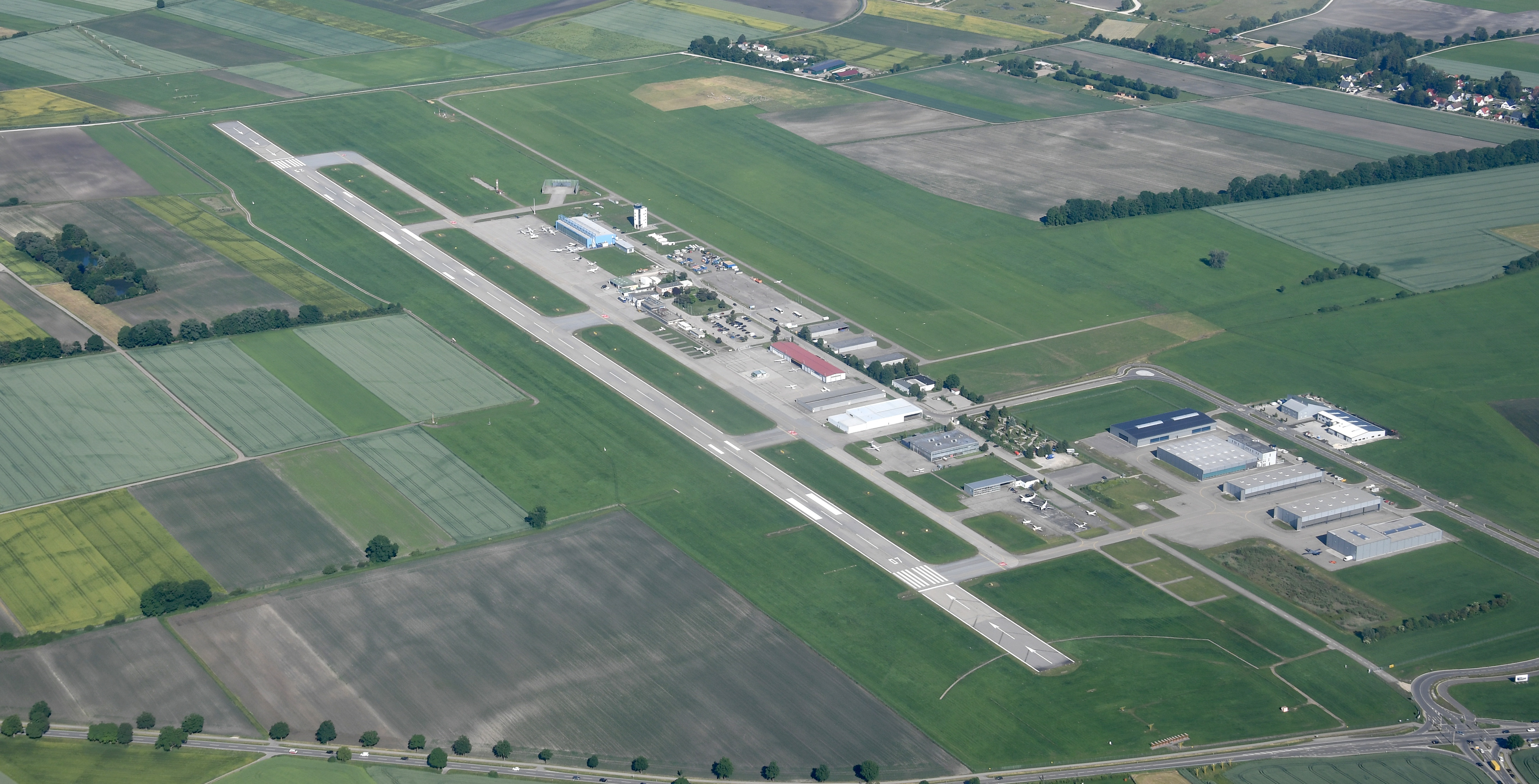
- IATA: AGB; ICAO: EDMA

Summary
- Airport type: Public
- Operator: Augsburger Flughafen GmbH
- Serves: Augsburg, Germany
- Location: Affing
- Hub for: Augsburg Airways (1996-2002); Interot Airways (1986-1996)
- Elevation AMSL: 1,515 ft / 462 m
- Coordinates: 48°25′31″N 10°55′54″E
- Website: www.augsburg-airport.de
- Interactive map of Augsburg Airport

Runways
Direction	Length		Surface
Direction	ft	m	Surface
07/25	5,230 (TODA)	1,594 (TODA)	Asphalt
- AIP at German air traffic control.

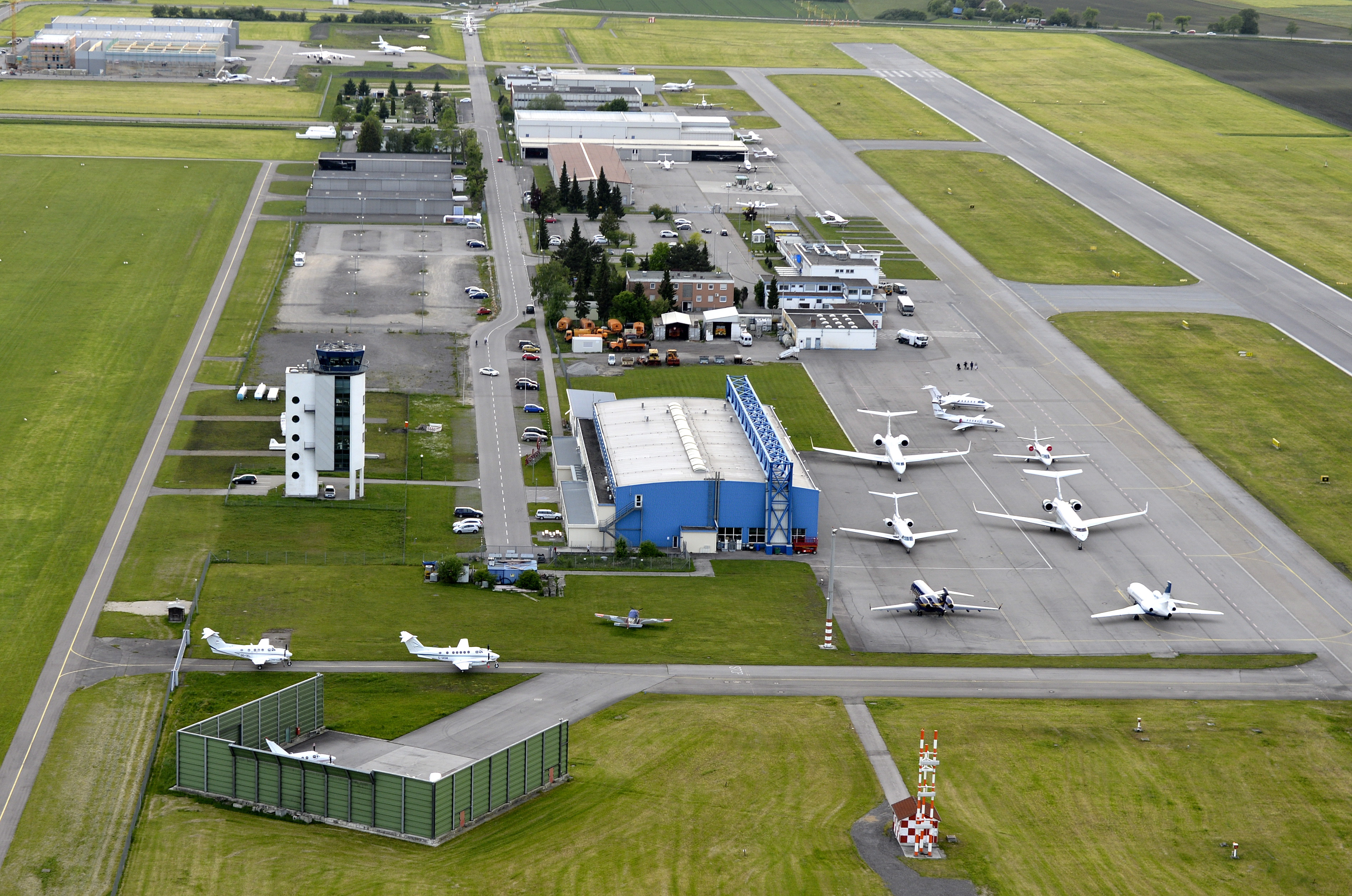
View of the main buildings at Augsburg Airport from the east

Augsburg Airport (IATA: AGB, ICAO: EDMA) is a regional airport in Affing, 7 kilometres (4.3 miles) northeast of the city of Augsburg, the third largest city in the German state of Bavaria. It is used for business and general aviation with very little passenger airline traffic.

== History ==
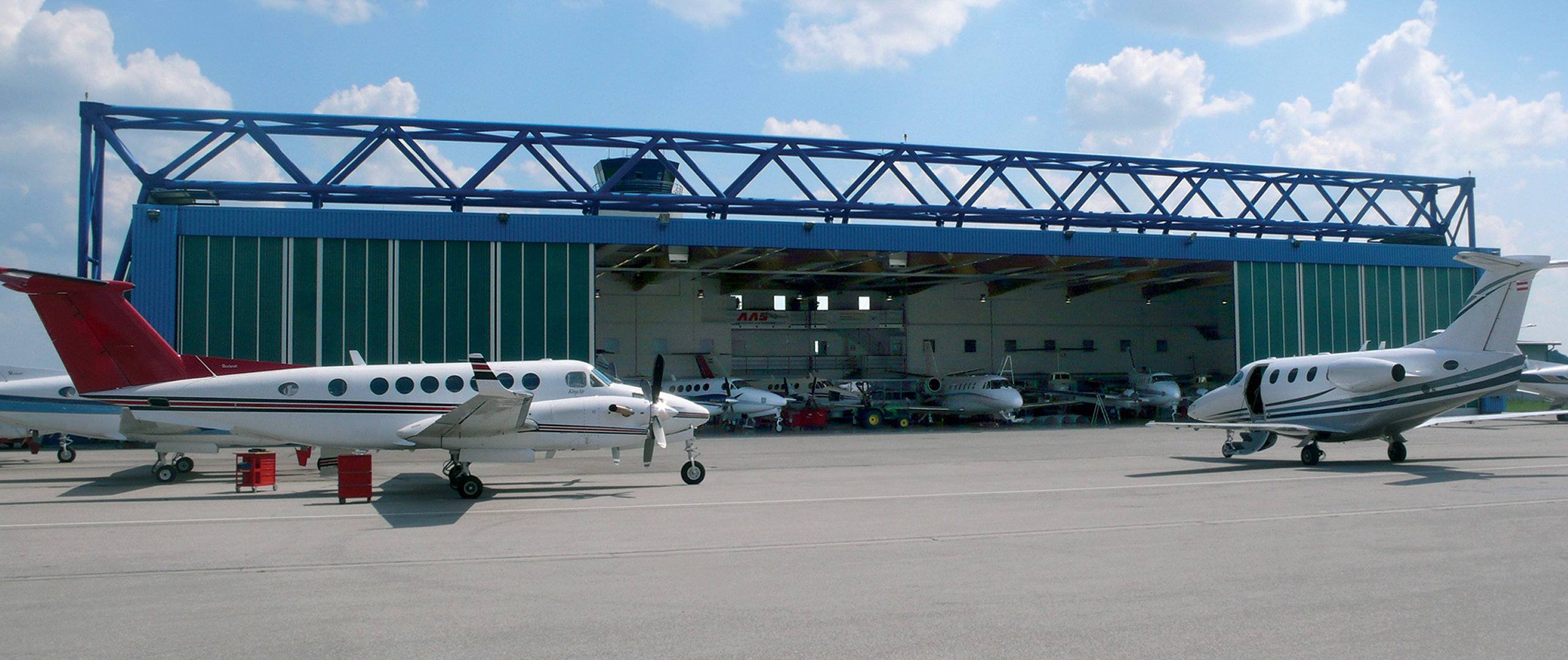
Maintenance facilities at the airport

The airport was opened in 1968 after its predecessor in the southern suburb Haunstetten had to be closed due to the construction of the new University of Augsburg on the airfield compound.

In 1986, Interot Airways commenced scheduled flight services at Augsburg Airport, initially to Düsseldorf. By the early 1990s, Interot's route network at Augsburg Airport had grown to also include Berlin, Cologne, Dresden, Hamburg and Leipzig, so that the airport was considered an alternative for business travellers who wished to avoid busy Munich Airport.

In 1995, Augsburg Airport saw the inauguration of international flights by Interot Airways, most notably to London City Airport.

Following Interot Airways having become a member of Team Lufthansa in 1996, the airline (which by then had been renamed Augsburg Airways) scaled down its presence at Augsburg Airport in favor of Munich Airport; the last routes were terminated in 2002.

After 2005, passenger traffic was relocated to Munich Airport, leaving the Augsburg region without a passenger airport within close reach. Since then, the airport is used almost entirely for general aviation and business airplanes. Passenger flights resumed in 2016 with a once-per-week flight to Salzburg.

== Airlines and destinations ==
As of September 2019, there were no scheduled or charter flights at the airport.

== Ground transportation ==
A ground transport connection by road exists to the nearby six-lane motorway A8 Munich (25min) - Stuttgart (1h) (Exit Augsburg Ost). Alternatively, bus 305 runs every hour from Augsburg main train station.

== See also ==
- Transport in Germany
- List of airports in Germany
