= Cirrus Airlines =

German regional airline

IATA	ICAO	Call sign
C9	RUS	CIRRUS AIR
- Commenced operations: February 1995; 31 years ago
- Ceased operations: January 2012; 14 years ago
- Hubs: Mannheim City Airport; Saarbrücken Airport
- Frequent-flyer program: Miles & More
- Fleet size: 10
- Destinations: 11
- Parent company: Aviation Investment Corp.
- Headquarters: Hallbergmoos, Germany
- Key people: Ingrid Schultheis; Jan Bresler
- Website: www.cirrusairlines.de

Cirrus Airlines Luftfahrtgesellschaft mbH was a German regional airline with its head office in Hallbergmoos and its maintenance facilities at Saarbrücken Airport. It operated both charter and scheduled flights, the latter on behalf of Lufthansa, Swiss International Air Lines and Air Moldova. Its main bases and hubs were Saarbrücken Airport and Mannheim City Airport. The company slogan was connecting business.

== History ==
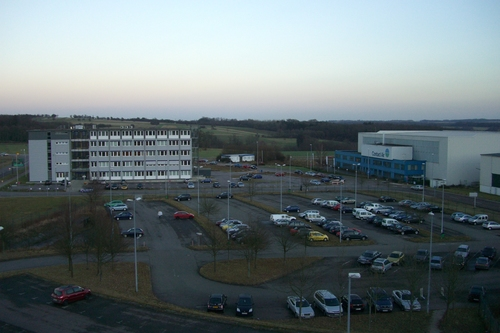
Cirrus Airlines maintenance base at Saarbrücken Airport

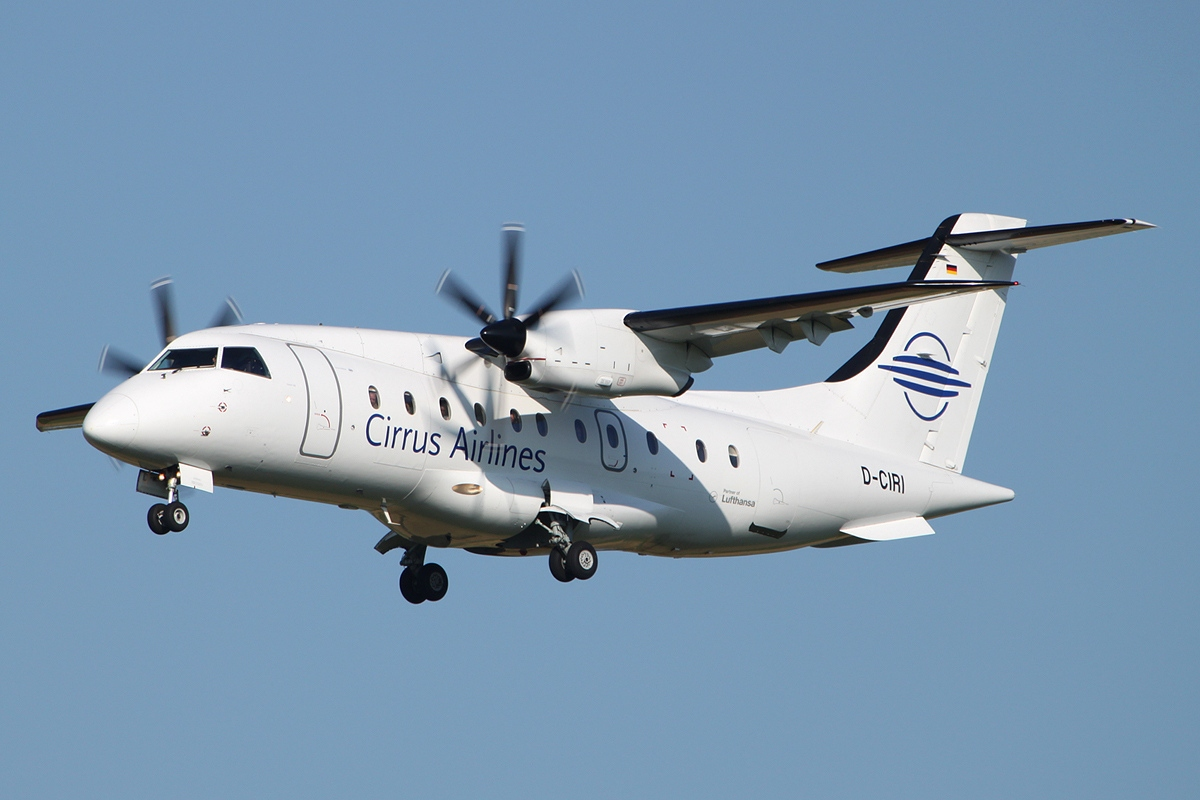
Cirrus Airlines Dornier 328

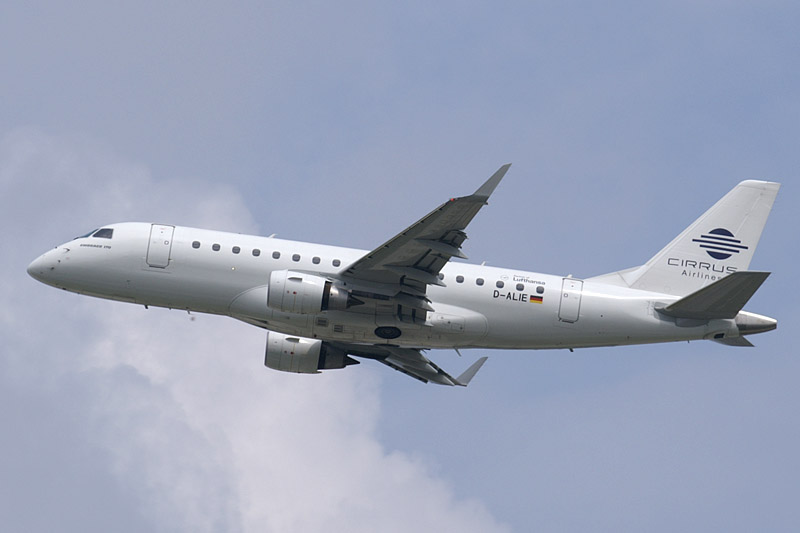
Cirrus Airlines Embraer 170

Cirrus Airlines was founded in February 1995 as Cirrus Luftfahrtgesellschaft mbH and operated an executive charter business. In March 1998, Cirrus Airlines received its licence to operate scheduled passenger services between Saarbrücken Airport and Hamburg. In August 1999, Cirrus Airlines took over Cosmos Air, its Dornier 328 and the route between Mannheim and Berlin Tempelhof and Baden Air in 2000.

In February 2000, upon the 5th anniversary of Cirrus Airlines, it established a cooperative partnership with German-owned Lufthansa and became a Team Lufthansa franchise member. In April that year, Cirrus received licences to operate regularly scheduled service between Mannheim City Airport and Hamburg Airport and between Berlin and Sylt.

Cirrus steadily expanded its business, with scheduled services operating mainly from Saarbrücken Airport and Mannheim City Airport to domestic destinations. The following years the airline started to decentralize its operations, also flying low-density point-to-point routes and adding Embraer-Jets to its Turboprop-Fleet.

In 2004 Cirrus Airlines took over Augsburg Airways, a Lufthansa Regional member. The headquarters were consequently moved to Hallbergmoos, near Munich Airport. Cirrus Technik and Cirrus Flight Training remained at Saarbrücken Airport.

The company introduced a modified corporate identity in January 2008. Cirrus Airlines was a company within Aviation Investment Corp. along with Cirrus Maintenance and Cirrus Service.

On 20 January 2012, the airline ceased operations and flew all aircraft back to Saarbrücken. This left some airports temporarily without scheduled service, like Hof Airport and Mannheim City Airport.

== Destinations ==
Cirrus Airlines served several scheduled destinations throughout Germany and Western and Central Europe, such as Berlin-Tempelhof, London-City, Cologne/Bonn and Bern.

== Fleet ==
Cirrus Airlines operated the following aircraft during its existence:

- 1 Airbus A310
- 1 Beechcraft Super King Air 200
- 1 Boeing 737-500
- 1 Boeing 737-800
- 8 De Havilland Canada DHC-8 Dash 8
- 19 Dornier 328 (1 donated to École nationale d'aérotechnique)
- 8 Embraer ERJ-145
- 3 Embraer 170

== Incidents and accidents ==
- June 28, 2006: A Cirrus Airlines Embraer 145 flying on behalf of Swiss International Air Lines overshoots the runway in Nuremberg. None of the 49 occupants on board were hurt.
- March 19, 2008: Flight 1567 from Berlin-Tempelhof overshoots runway 27 of the Mannheim City Airport and comes to rest on a wall close to a highway. Five of the 27 people on board were hurt, and the aircraft, a Dornier 328 (D-CTOB), was severely damaged.
