= Lufthansa CityLine Flight 5634 =

1993 aviation incident that killed 4

Coordinates: 49°00′07″N 2°37′03″E

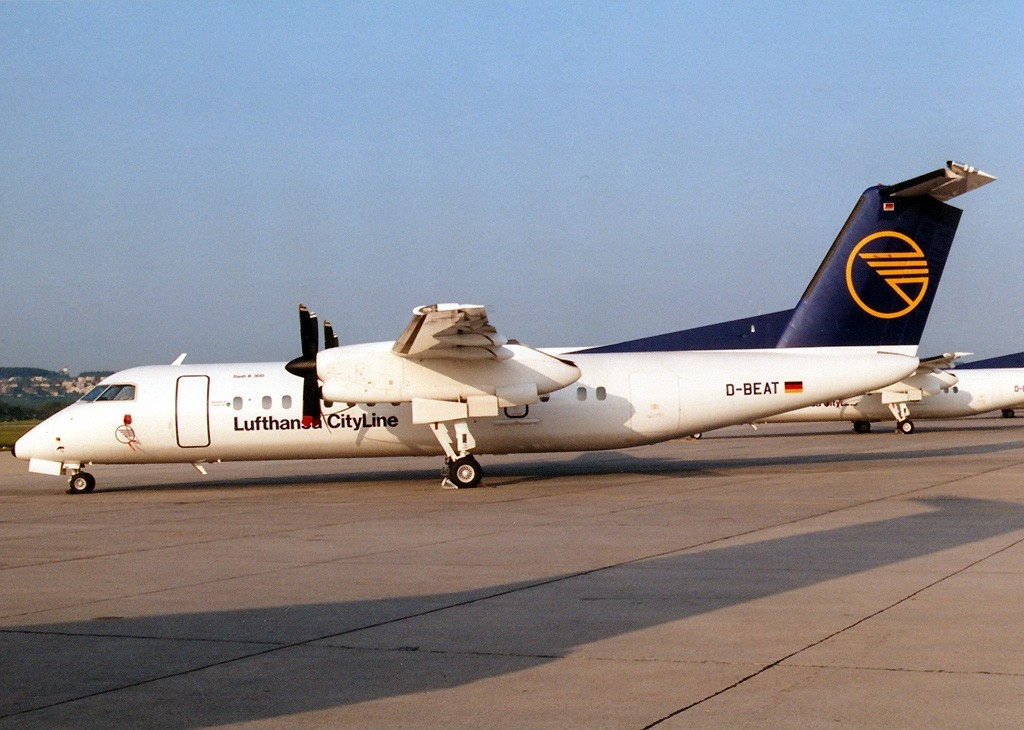
- D-BEAT, the aircraft involved in the accident, in May 1992.

Accident
- Date: 6 January 1993
- Summary: Crashed short of runway
- Site: Near Paris-Charles de Gaulle Airport, France

Aircraft
- Aircraft type: De Havilland Canada Dash 8-300
- Operator: Contact Air for Lufthansa CityLine
- Call sign: CONTACTAIR 5634
- Registration: D-BEAT
- Flight origin: Bremen Airport, Germany
- Destination: Paris-Charles de Gaulle Airport, France
- Occupants: 23
- Passengers: 19
- Crew: 4
- Fatalities: 4
- Injuries: 19
- Survivors: 19

On 6 January 1993, Lufthansa CityLine Flight 5634 departed Bremen Airport for Paris-Charles de Gaulle Airport at 17:30. The aircraft operating the flight was a Dash 8-311, with 23 passengers and crew.

== Background ==
=== Aircraft ===
The aircraft involved was a De Havilland Canada Dash 8-311, MSN 210, registered as D-BEAT, that was built by de Havilland Canada in 1990. It logged 5973 airframe hours and was equipped with two Pratt & Whitney Canada PW123 engines.

=== Crew ===
The captain was a 54 year old male, with 11,924 total flight hours, 2003 were on the DHC-8. The co-pilot was also a male, but he was 25, having only 500 total flight hours, of which, 293 were on the DHC-8.

== Accident ==
When Flight 5634 was nearing Paris, a Korean Air Boeing 747 scraped an engine pod while landing on runway 27, causing air traffic controllers to close the runway briefly. The pilots were notified to change course to another runway. While turning to line up with runway 28, the airliner, in clouds and heavy fog, entered a high sink rate and crashed into the ground tail-first. The aircraft broke into two, but there was no fire. The crash killed 4 passengers and 19 further were injured in the accident.
