= Contact Air =

German regional airline

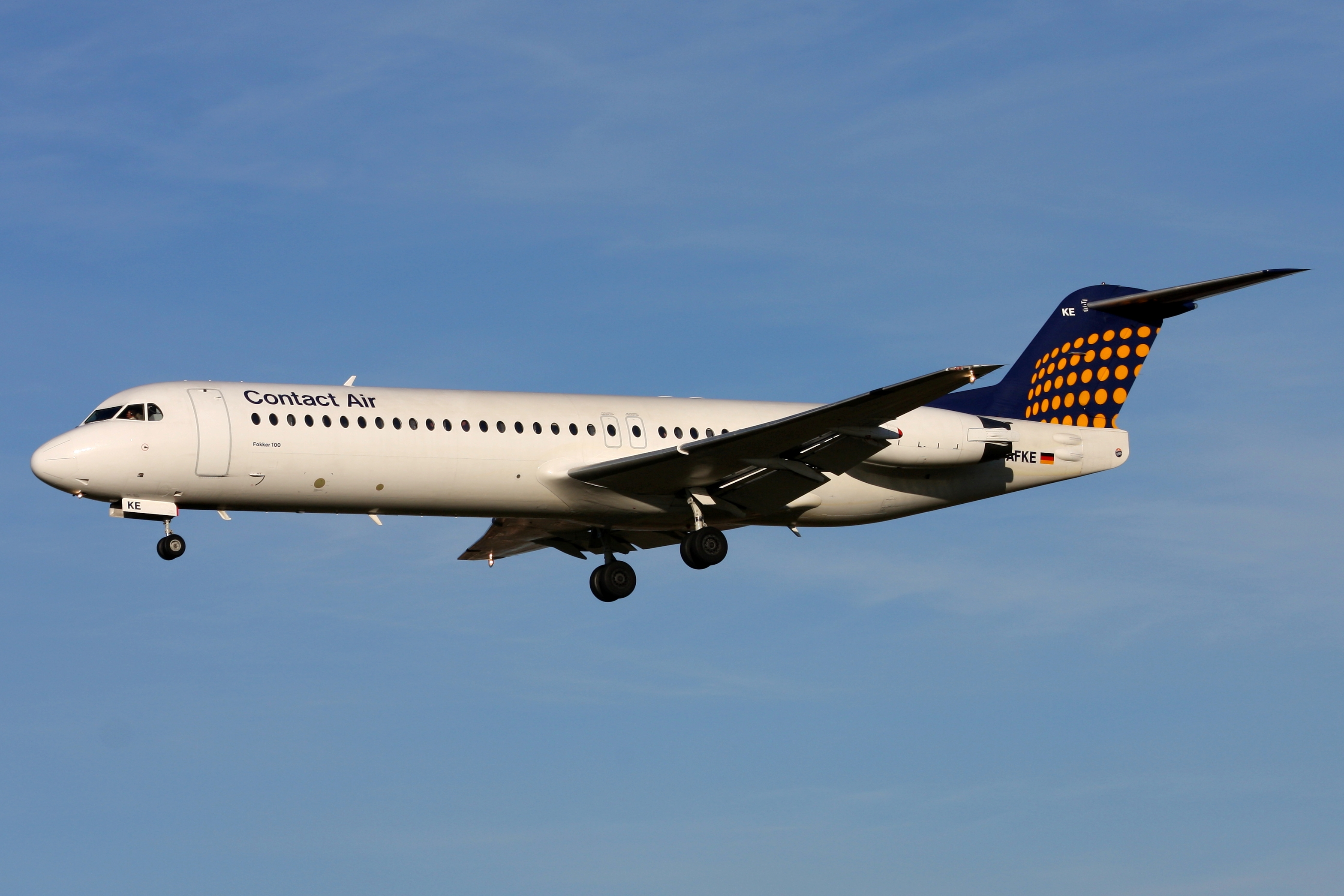
- Fokker 100 in Lufthansa Regional livery
IATA	ICAO	Call sign
C3	KIS	CONTACTAIR
- Founded: September 1974
- Commenced operations: 1974 - airline-type operations 1983
- Ceased operations: September 1, 2012 merged assets and some operations into OLT Express Germany)
- Operating bases: Stuttgart Airport
- Frequent-flyer program: Miles & More
- Alliance: Star Alliance
- Headquarters: Filderstadt, Germany
- Key people: W.A. Hayward (owner)
- Website: contactair.de

Contact Air Flugdienst was a German regional airline from Filderstadt. With flight operations based at Stuttgart Airport, it operated scheduled passenger flights under the Lufthansa Regional brand.

== History ==
The airline was founded in 1974 as a tax-break by Gunter Eheim, a German WWII test pilot and later manufacturer of aquarium filters, initially operating charter passenger services using a small fleet of Dassault Falcon 20 and Learjet executive jetliners. In 1981, Contact Air became one of the launch customers for the British Aerospace Jetstream. Its first aircraft was delivered in the following year. This event accelerated the company's march towards more regular and structured flight activities.

In fact, in May 1984, Contact Air was subcontracted by DLT to operate one of its Jetstreams on scheduled regional flights on behalf of Lufthansa. Subsequently, DLT acquired 24.8 percent of the Contact Air shares. Having waged the alternative of ordering the ATR 42, Contact Air announced in 1986 that it had chosen the de Havilland Canada Dash 8-100 for a fleet enlargement, thus becoming the second European airline to operate that type. Two years later, Contact Air became the first non-Canadian buyer of the stretched Dash 8-300 version, ordering three aircraft worth $35 million.

In April 1996, Contact Air became a founding member of Team Lufthansa. In 2004, this airline association was reorganized as Lufthansa Regional, a Star Alliance affiliate. Henceforth, all Contact Air flights were operated using the Lufthansa branding and flight numbers.

On 29 November 2011, it was reported that Lufthansa would terminate its contract with Contact Air effective 1 October 2012. At that time, the Contact Air fleet consisted of eight Fokker 100, six of which were operated on behalf of Lufthansa out of Stuttgart Airport, with another two being based at Zurich Airport and operated for Swiss International Air Lines. In May 2012, Contact Air agreed to be taken over by OLT Express Germany, a step which was finalized in September of that year following its approval by the Federal Cartel Office. All the assets and some operations were merged into OLT Express Germany and Contact Air was dissolved on 27 January 2013.

== Corporate affairs ==
Prior to acquisition the headquarters were in Filderstadt. Previously they were in Stuttgart.

== Destinations ==
The scheduled destinations that were served by Contact Air on behalf of Lufthansa included:

Country	City	Airport
Austria	Graz	Graz Airport
Austria	Vienna	Vienna International Airport
Belgium	Brussels	Brussels Airport
Czech Republic	Prague	Prague Ruzyně International Airport
France	Mulhouse	EuroAirport Basel–Mulhouse–Freiburg
France	Paris	Charles de Gaulle Airport
Germany	Berlin	Berlin Tegel Airport
Germany	Bremen	Bremen Airport
Germany	Cologne	Cologne Bonn Airport
Germany	Dresden	Dresden Airport
Germany	Düsseldorf	Düsseldorf Airport
Germany	Frankfurt	Frankfurt Airport
Germany	Hamburg	Hamburg Airport
Germany	Hannover	Hannover Airport
Germany	Leipzig	Leipzig/Halle Airport
Germany	Munich	Munich Airport
Germany	Nuremberg	Nuremberg Airport
Germany	Paderborn	Paderborn Lippstadt Airport
Germany	Stuttgart	Stuttgart Airport (base)
Hungary	Budapest	Budapest Ferihegy International Airport
Italy	Bologna	Bologna Guglielmo Marconi Airport
Italy	Milan	Malpensa Airport
Italy	Turin	Turin Airport
Switzerland	Geneva	Geneva International Airport
Switzerland	Zürich	Zurich Airport

== Fleet ==
Over the years of its existence, Contact Air operated the following aircraft types:

Aircraft	Introduced	Retired
ATR 42-500	2003	2010
ATR 72-212	2005	2010
British Aerospace Jetstream	1982	Unknown
De Havilland Canada Dash 8-100	1986	1994
De Havilland Canada Dash 8-300	1990	1997
Fokker 50	1996	2004
Fokker 100	2008	2012

== Gallery ==
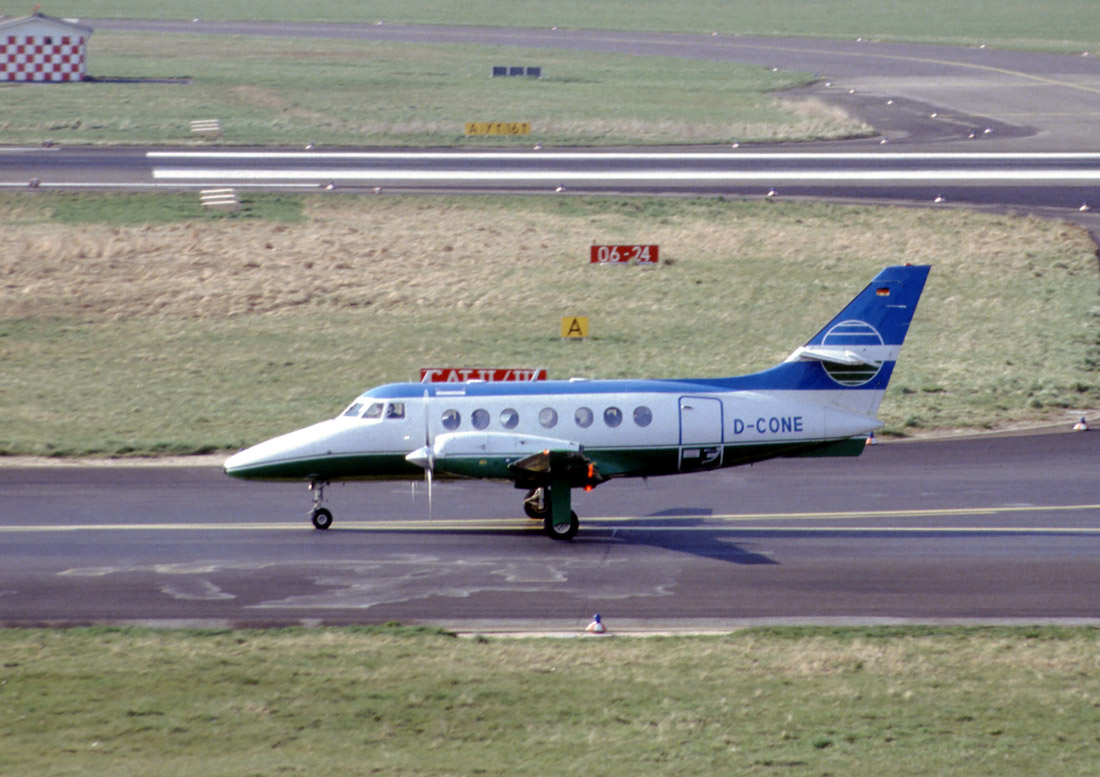
British Aerospace Jetstream

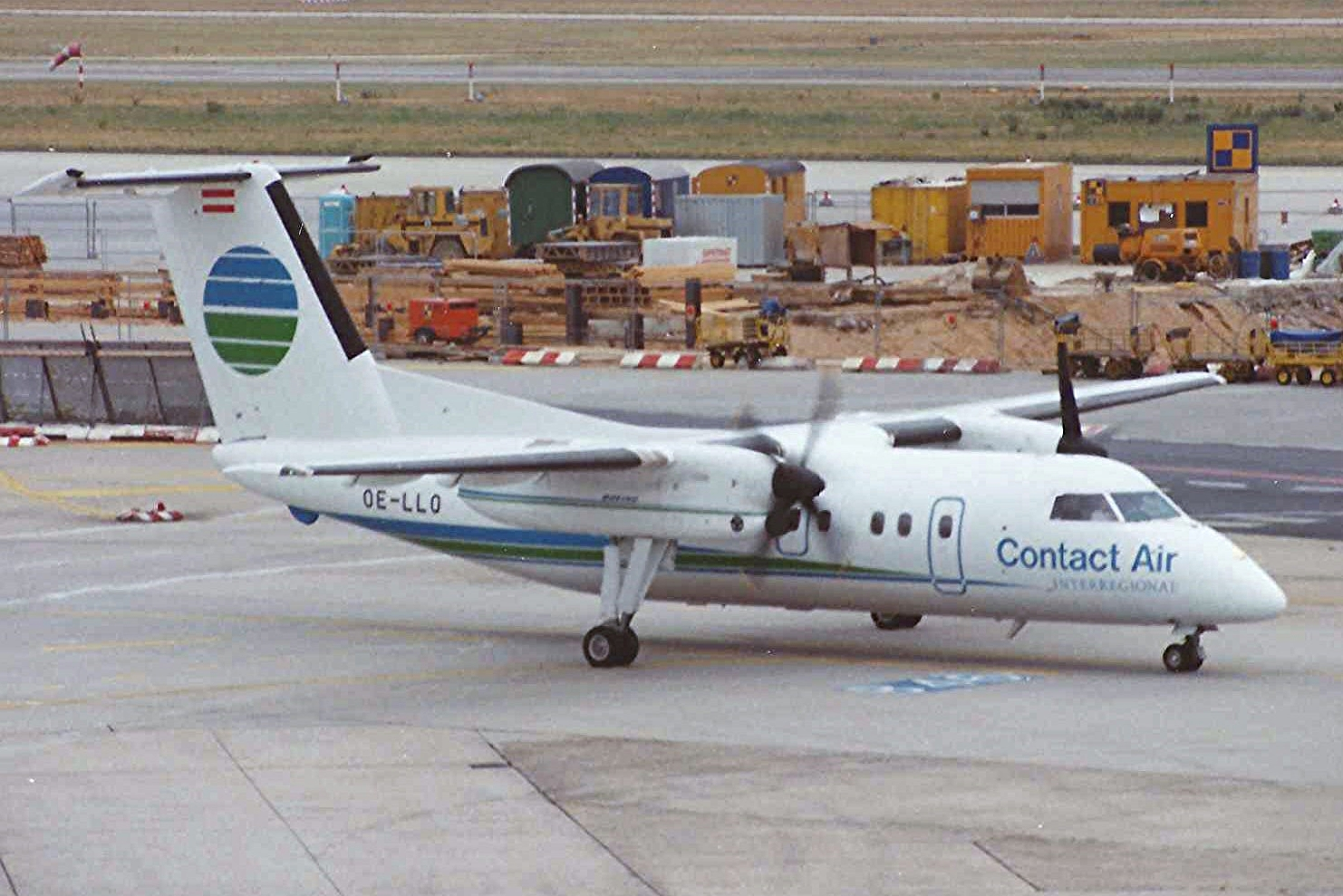
De Havilland Canada Dash 8-100 in June 1990

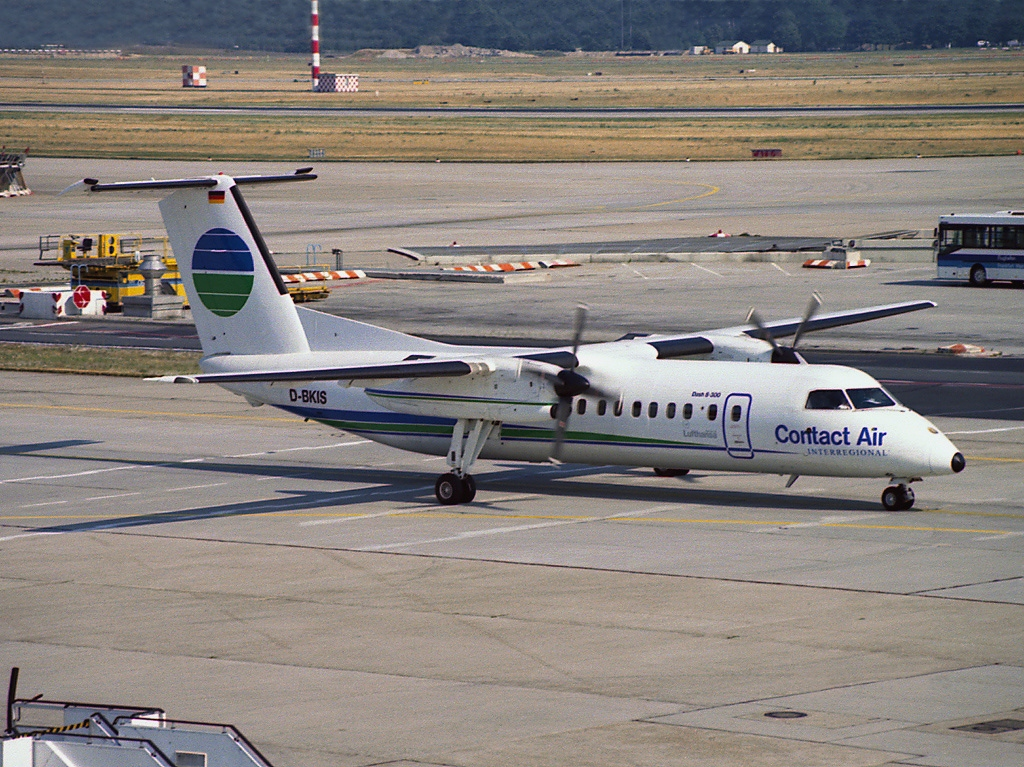
Dash 8-300 in 1994

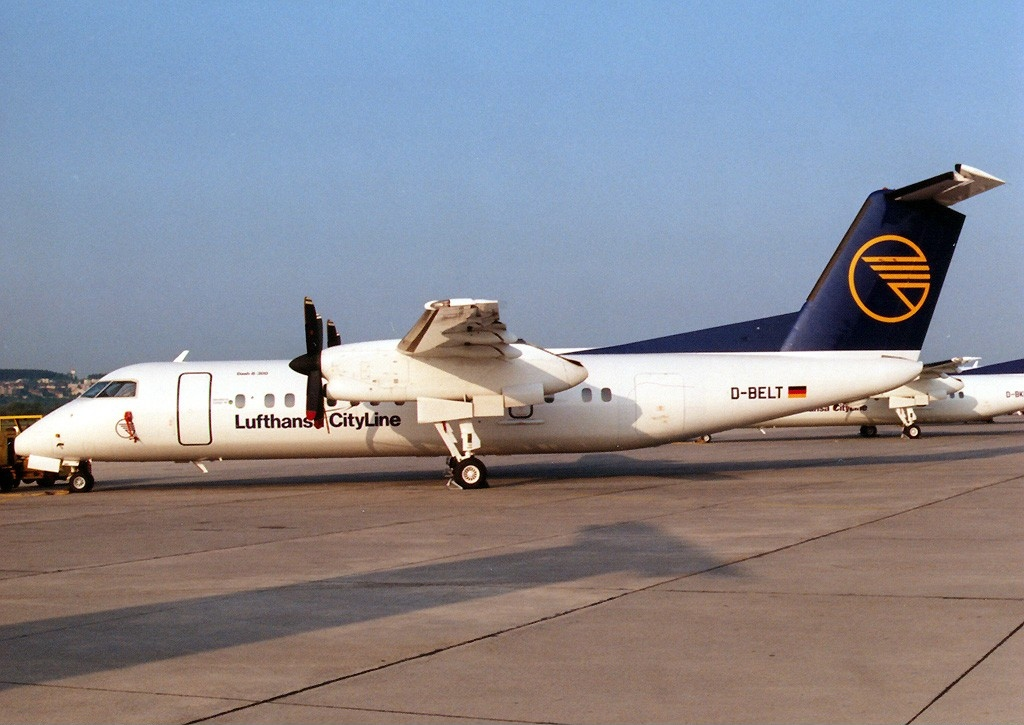
De Havilland Canada Dash 8-300 in Lufthansa CityLine colors

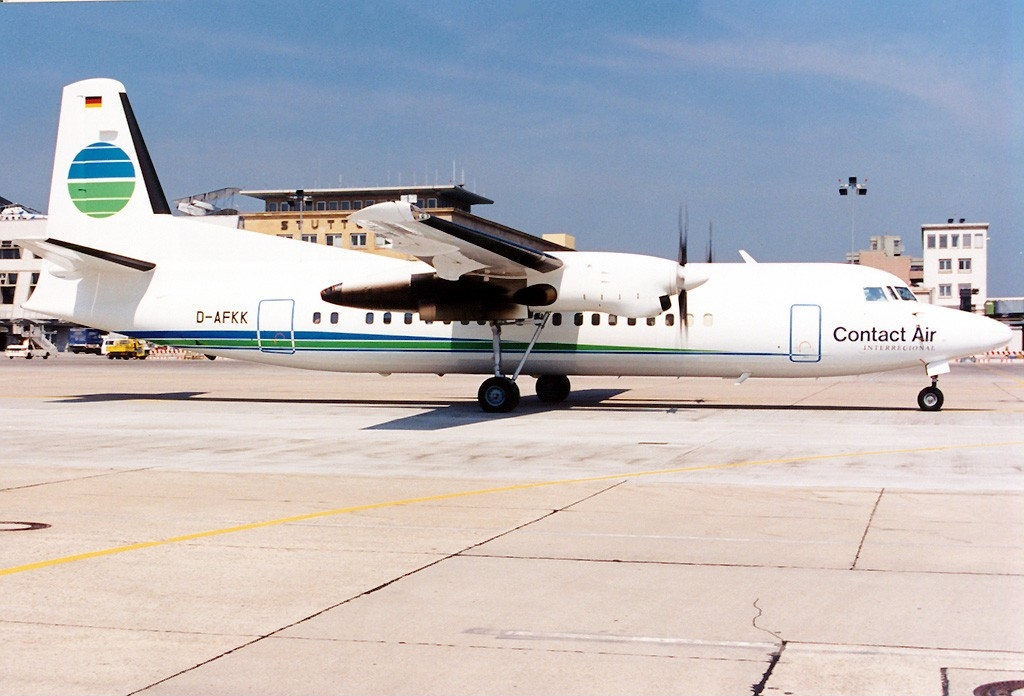
Fokker 50

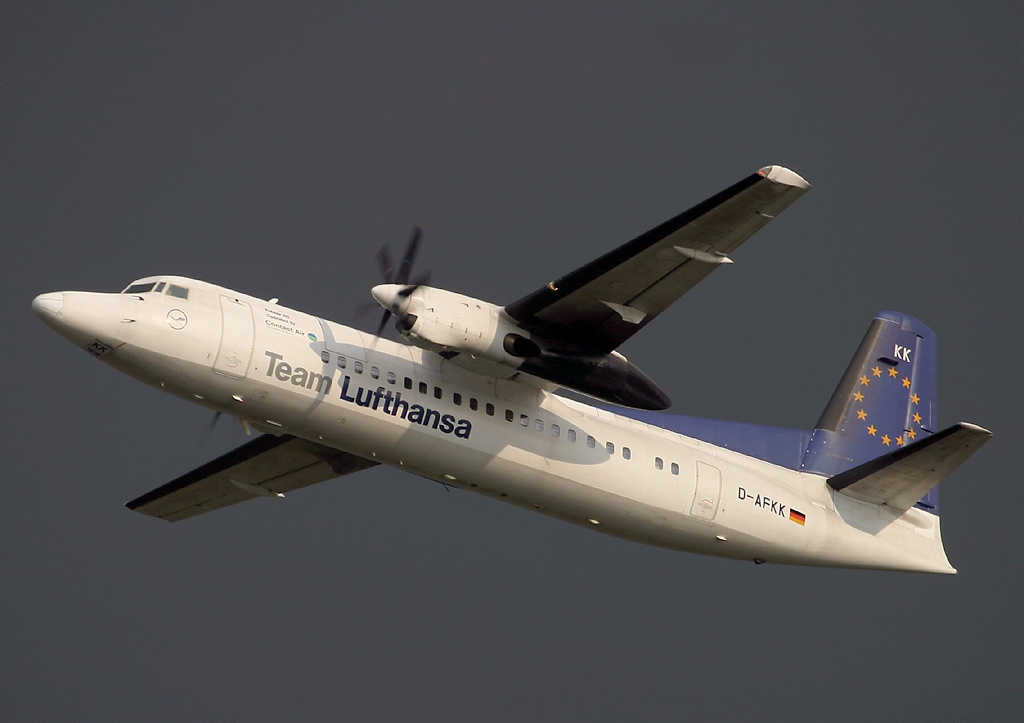
Fokker 50 in Team Lufthansa livery, in 2003

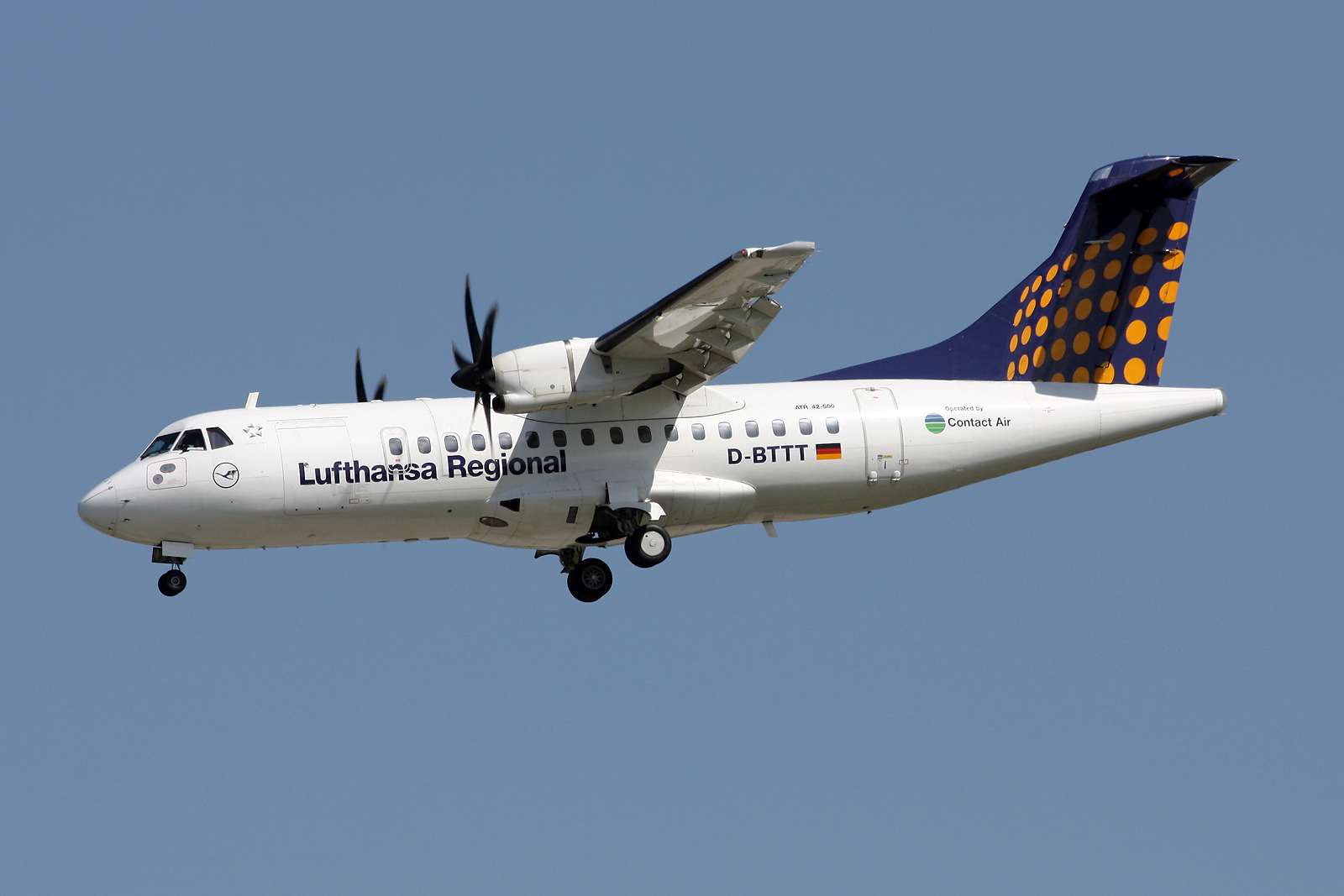
ATR 42-500 in Lufthansa Regional livery, in 2008

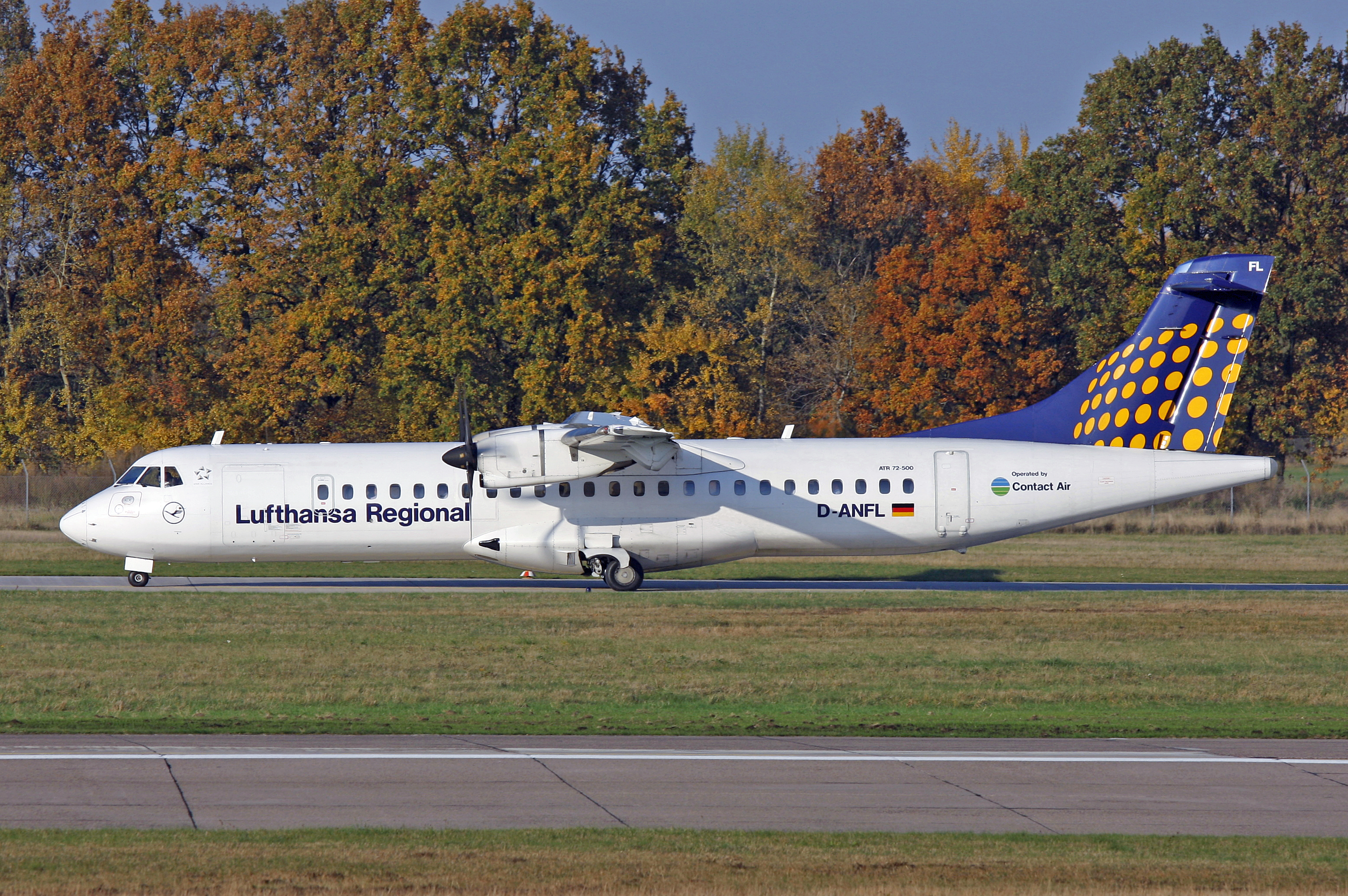
ATR 72-212

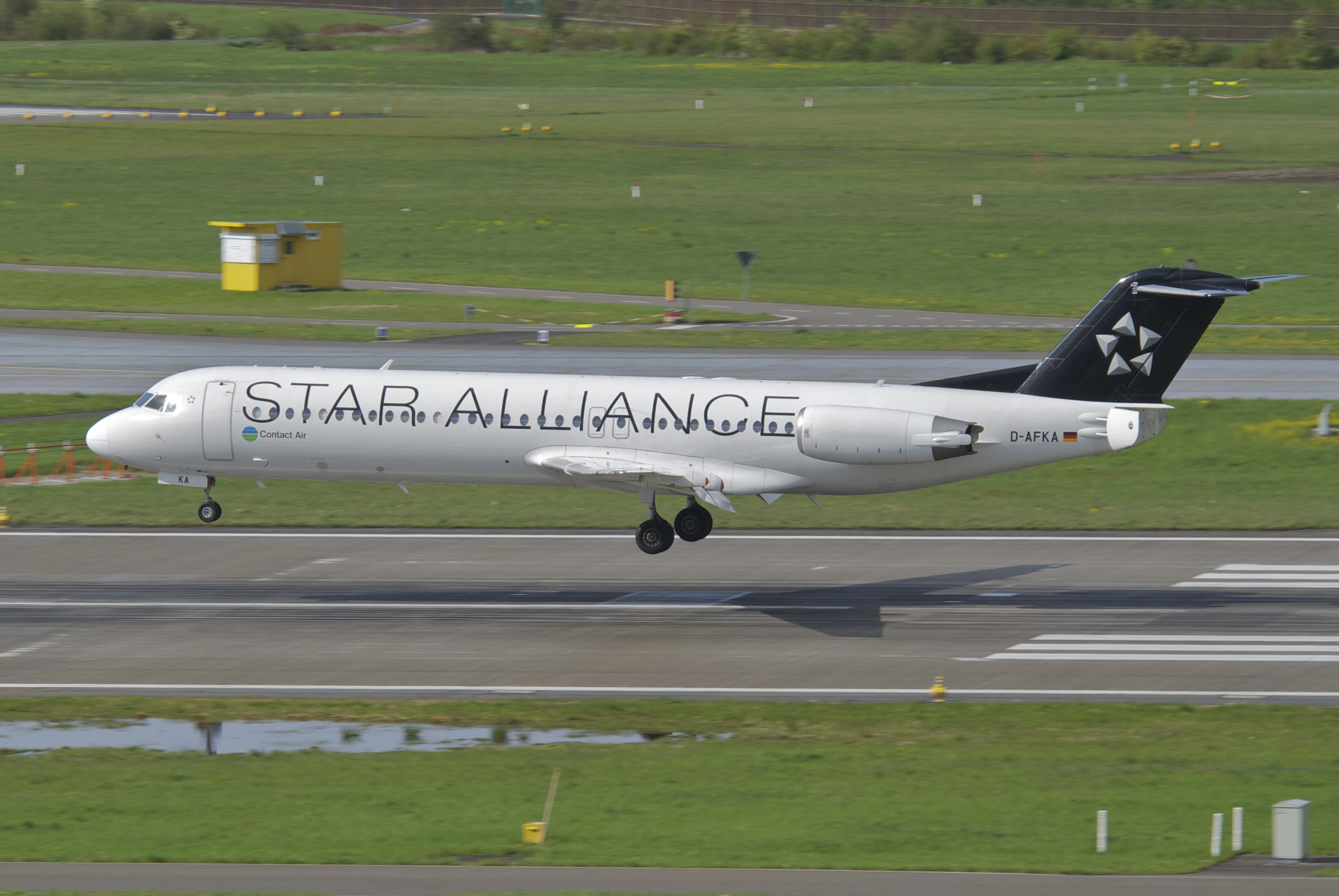
Fokker 100 in Star Alliance livery

== Incidents and accidents ==
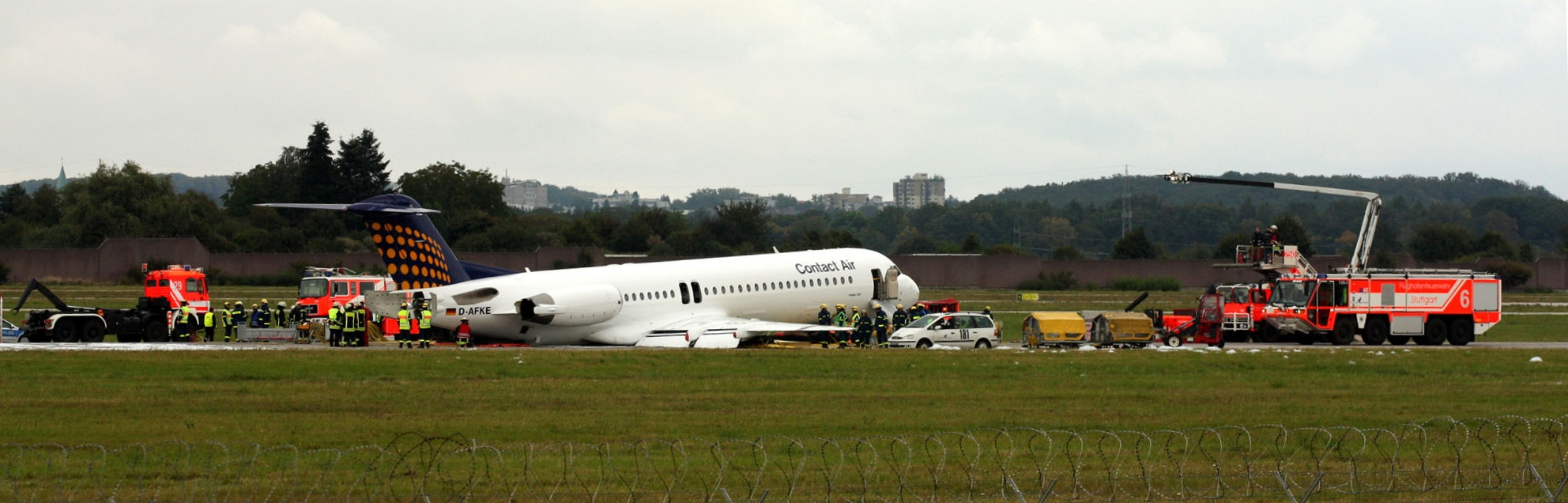
The Fokker 100 involved in the emergency landing of Flight 288 shortly after the incident at Stuttgart Airport.

1. On 6 January 1993, Lufthansa Flight 5634 from Bremen to Paris, which was carried out under the Lufthansa CityLine brand using a Contact Air Dash 8-300 (registered D-BEAT), crashed 1,800 metres (5,900 ft) short of the runway of Paris-Charles de Gaulle Airport. Four out of the 23 passengers on board died; the four crew members survived. The accident happened as a result of a failed go-around, which had become necessary because the aircraft ahead, a Boeing 747 of Korean Air, had suffered a blown tyre upon landing and the runway had subsequently been closed.
2. On 14 September 2009, Lufthansa Flight 288 from Berlin to Stuttgart, which was operated by a Contact Air Fokker 100 registered D-AFKE, made an emergency landing at Stuttgart Airport at 10:47 local time due to undercarriage failure. There were no injuries amongst the five crew members and 73 passengers on board. In the media coverage following the accident, Contact Air was criticised for operating ageing Fokker 100 aircraft, some of which previously had belonged to an airline that had been banned from European airspace over safety concerns.
