= Lufthansa Regional =

Former regional aircraft branding of Lufthansa

IATA	ICAO	Call sign
LH	DLH	LUFTHANSA
- Founded: 2003
- Operating bases: Verona, Italy
- Hubs: Frankfurt Airport; Munich Airport
- Frequent-flyer program: Miles & More
- Alliance: Star Alliance (affiliate)
- Fleet size: 53
- Parent company: Lufthansa

Lufthansa Regional was an operational entity for regional and feeder flights performed by up to five regional airlines owned or contracted by Lufthansa within its route network. As part of Lufthansa's rebranding, the Lufthansa Regional brand name has gradually been removed from the public eye since early 2018. The repainted aircraft no longer wear Lufthansa Regional titles.

== Overview ==
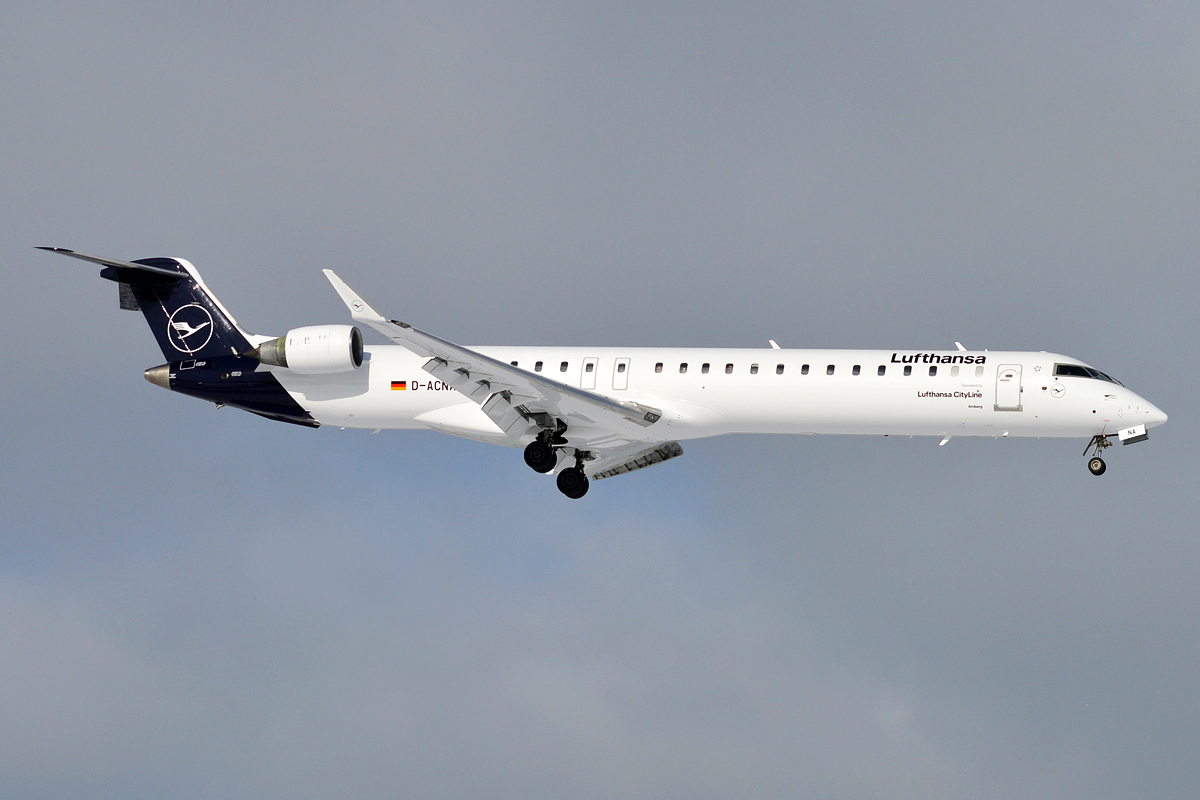
Lufthansa CityLine CRJ900 operated as part of Lufthansa Regional in its current livery without "Regional" titles

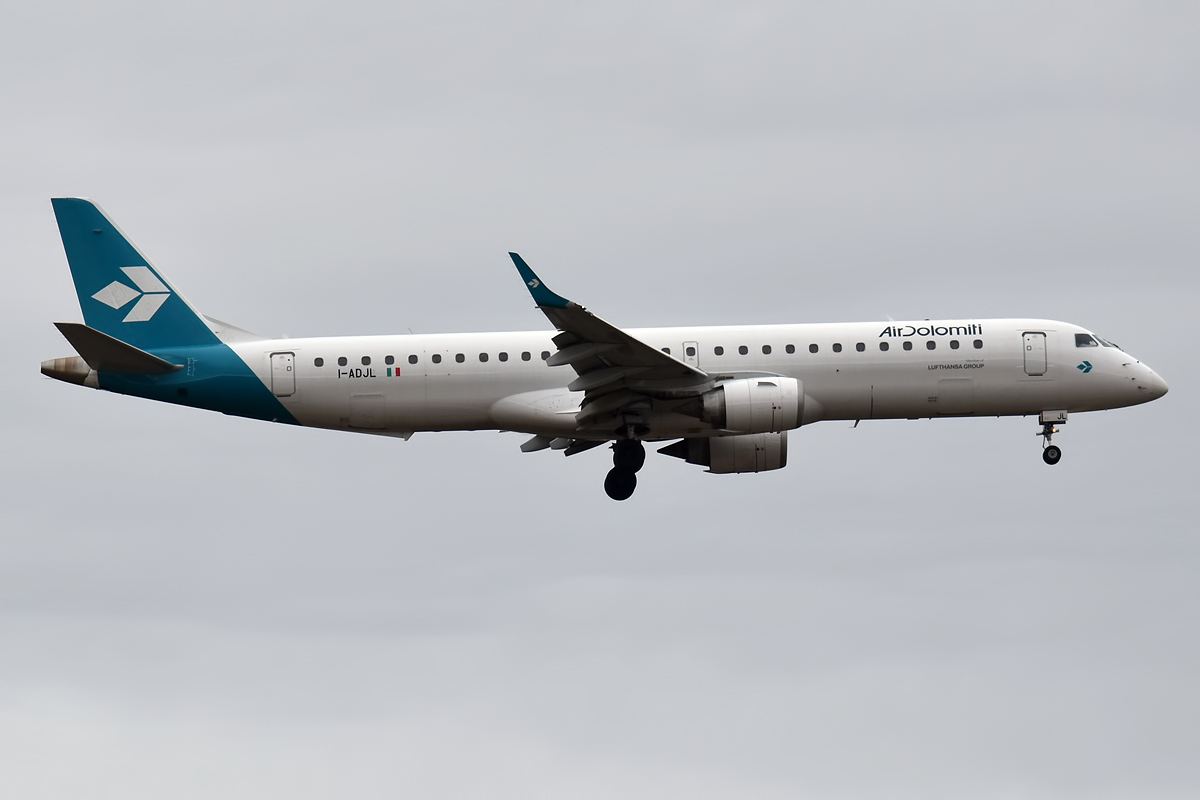
Air Dolomiti Embraer 195 operating for Lufthansa Regional in its own livery

Lufthansa Regional was founded as the successor of the similar Team Lufthansa, which consisted of predominantly independent airlines contracted by Lufthansa. As of January 2018, Lufthansa Regional consists of two members, Air Dolomiti and Lufthansa CityLine, which are both fully owned by Lufthansa. They are based at Lufthansa's hubs at Frankfurt Airport and Munich Airport and carry 10.5 million passengers a year, mostly to minor domestic and European destinations.

As part of Lufthansa's new corporate design introduced in early 2018, Lufthansa Regional aircraft operated by Lufthansa CityLine are also receiving the new livery with the "Lufthansa." "Regional" titles are being removed from the fuselages of Lufthansa Regional aircraft and replaced by "Lufthansa" titles.

As of March 2020, one sole route remained as operated by Air Dolomiti under the Lufthansa brand while all other of their operations are codeshared using their own brand name.

== Former member airlines ==
- Air Dolomiti (also operated some routes under their own brand)
- Lufthansa CityLine (also operated some routes under the Lufthansa main brand, ceased operations in April 2026)
- Augsburg Airways (ceased operations by October 2013 as the contract with Lufthansa wasn't renewed)
- Contact Air (ceased operations by October 2012 as the contract with Lufthansa wasn't renewed, remaining assets taken over by now defunct OLT Express Germany)
- Eurowings (until 25 October 2014 when Eurowings started flying exclusively on behalf of Germanwings)
