= Lufthansa CityLine =

Regional airline of Germany (1958–2026)

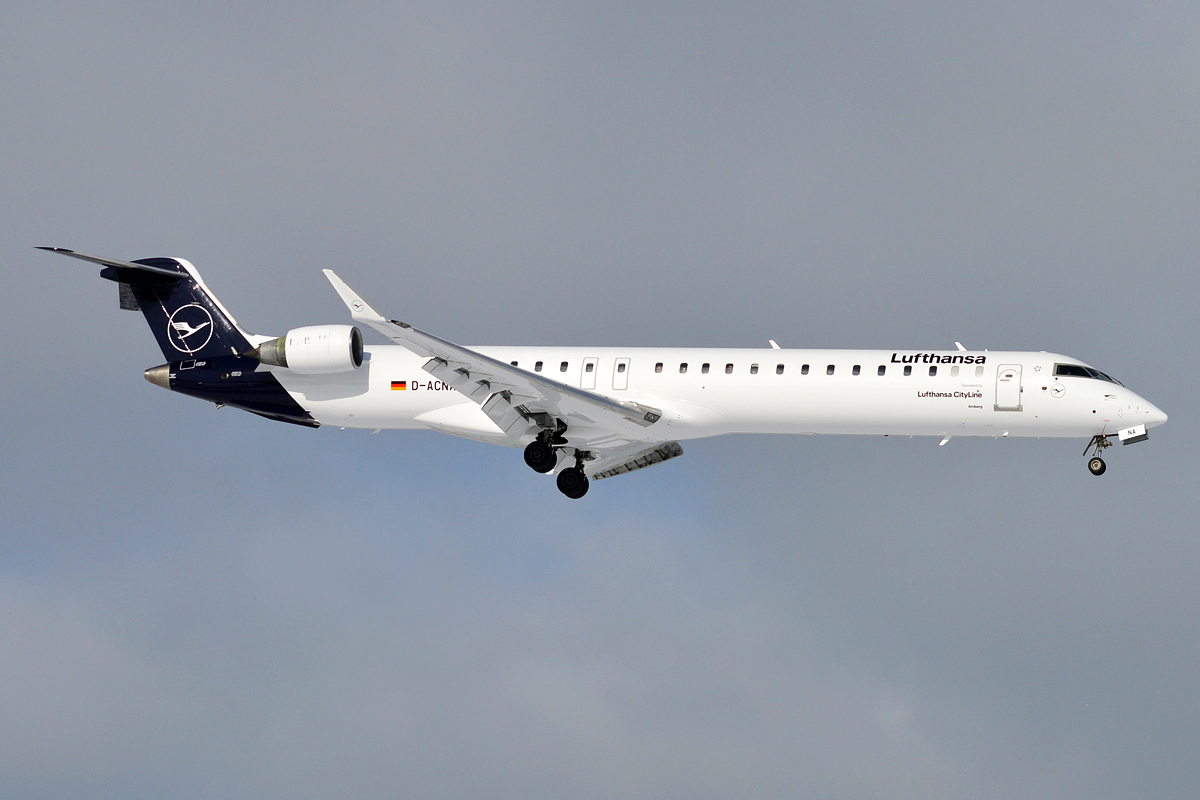
- CRJ900 in 2018
IATA	ICAO	Call sign
CL	CLH	HANSALINE
- Founded: 1 October 1974 (as DLT)
- Commenced operations: 17 October 1974 (as DLT)
- Ceased operations: 18 April 2026 (as Lufthansa CityLine)
- Hubs: Frankfurt; Munich
- Frequent-flyer program: Miles & More
- Alliance: Star Alliance (affiliate; 1997–2026)
- Fleet size: 27
- Destinations: 85
- Parent company: Lufthansa Group
- Headquarters: Munich, Bavaria, Germany
- Key people: Carsten Wirths; Jörg Eberhart
- Employees: 2,236 (31 December 2017)
- Website: www.lufthansacityline.com

Lufthansa CityLine was a German regional airline with its headquarters on the grounds of Munich Airport. It was a wholly owned subsidiary of Lufthansa and maintained hubs at Frankfurt Airport and Munich Airport, from where it operated a dense domestic and European network on behalf of its parent company.

== History ==
=== Early years ===
The origins date back to 1958, the year OLT-Ostfriesische Lufttaxi (OLT) was founded. Through some transformations DLT Lufttransport GmbH was founded on October 1, 1974, with registered office in Frankfurt, and began flying on the following 17. The initial fleet consisted of three DHC 6s, later joined by a total of six Short 330s, delivered from 1977. In 1976 the company shifted its operational focus towards feeder connections to more important airports. However, the activities were not profitable and the company began looking for a partner who was able to invest. In June 1978 Lufthansa took a 26% stake in the company which immediately began cooperating with Lufthansa on short-range international routes such as Bremen-Copenhagen, Bremen-Amsterdam, and Hanover-Amsterdam. On 29 June 1978 the company was legally renamed DLT-Deutsche Luftverkehrs GmbH. The philosophy was to fly all routes where Lufthansa's basic Boeing 737s (100 seats) had excess capacity. In fact, in the early 1980s, DLT had a network that included 10 domestic destinations and Basel, Switzerland. In spring 1981 the first of six HS.748s (800 nautical miles range) entered service.

On 29 March 1982 DLT started flying from Zurich to Hannover and Nurnberg on Lufthansa and Swissair behalf, and Basel-Dusseldorf and Geneva-Munich routes pooled with Swissair. The entire network included 17 domestic and international destinations. The expansion required additional aircraft, and as a stop-gap solution, the airline leased Fokker 27s, Swearingen Metroliners, and Jetstream 31s. After careful evaluation, six Fokker 50s were ordered in February 1985, with an option for another six. Just two months later another purchase contract: five Embraer EMB-120 Brasilias and as many options (later increased to 9 + 6). Almost simultaneously, Lufthansa increased its stake to 40%. In 1984 the Shorts were retired and the 748s leased out in 1989. In August 1987 the Fokker 50 entered service while the Brasilias, operational from October 1986, were not welcomed by jetliners-accustomed passenger and were entirely leased out from 1989.

From 1988 till 1991 passenger figures climbed at a rate of 20% a year, meaning 1/3 of the interregional air traffic out of Germany, only 3% feeder, 80% routes with LH flight numbers. Business travellers comprised 85% of the total. In the summer of 1989, Lufthansa further increased its stake to 52% of the shares. In 1990 DLT became the launch customer of Bombardier CRJ100 regional jet with 13 firm orders and 12 options. This decision was also influenced by the fact that the company's network now covered eight major German cities. On December 26, 1990, the milestone of one millionth passenger was celebrated.

=== Lufthansa CityLine ===
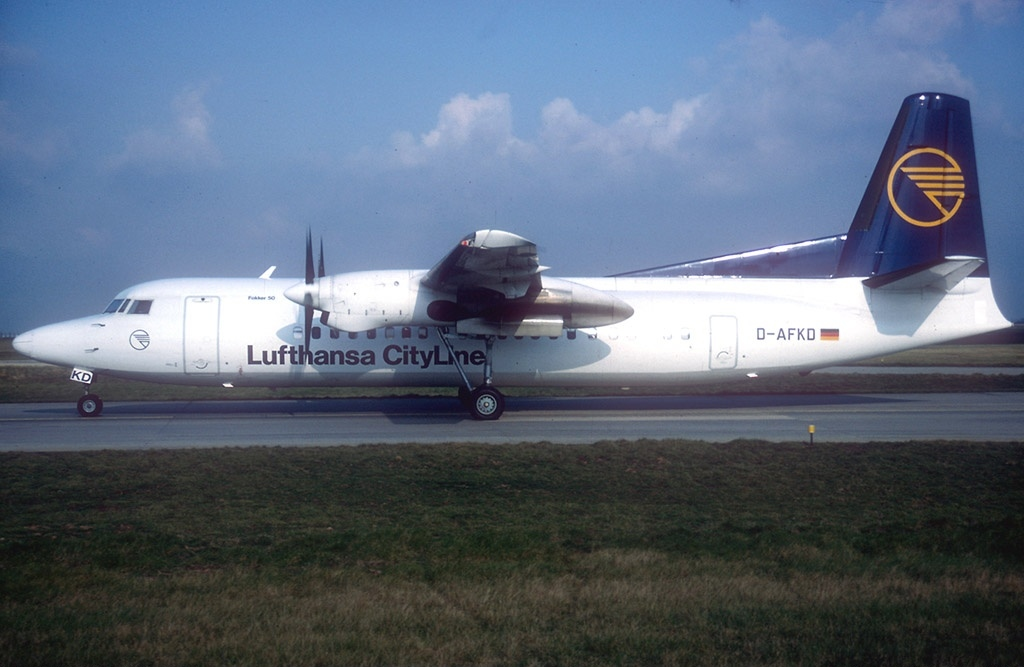
Fokker 50 in 1992

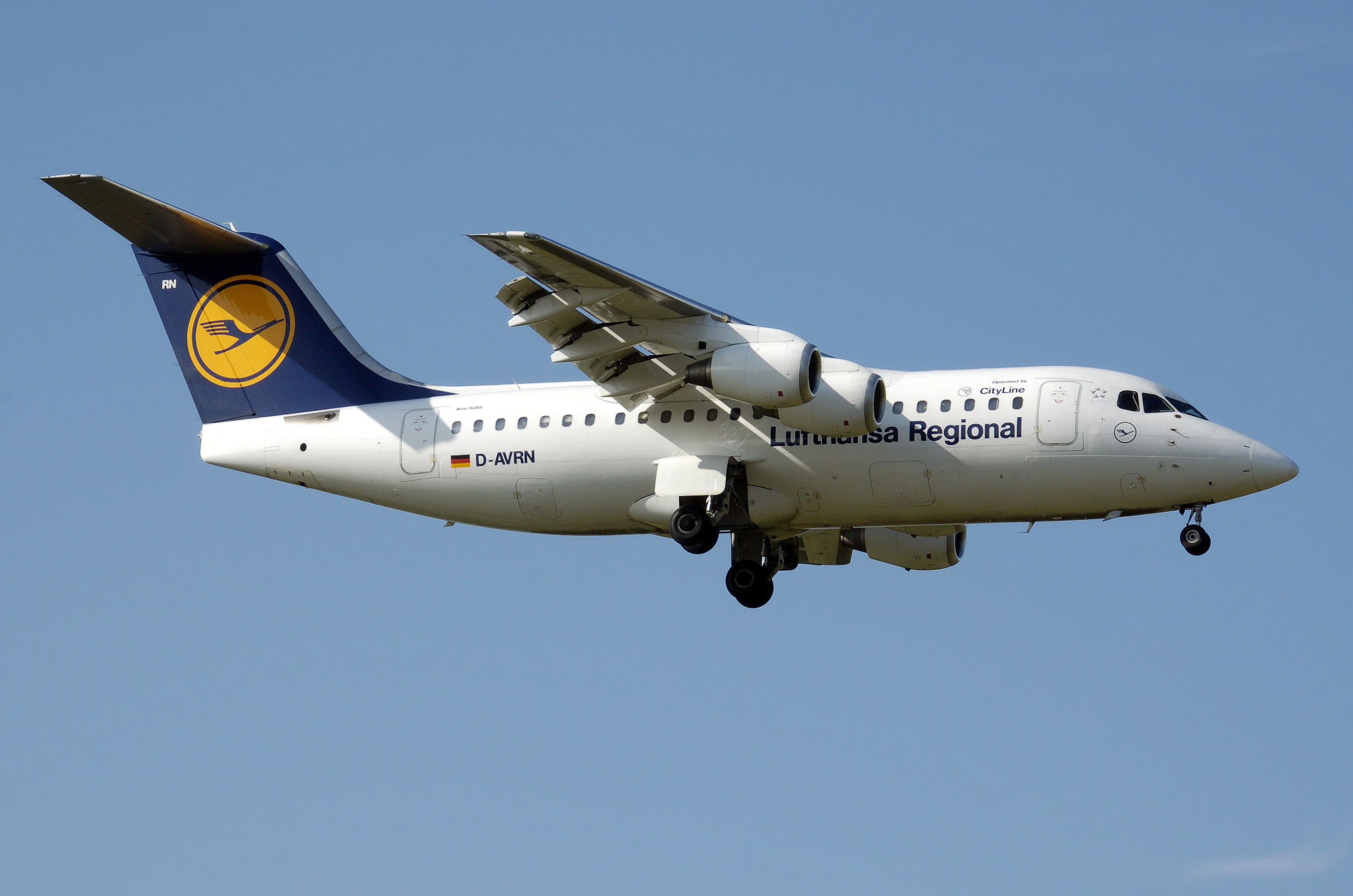
Avro RJ85 with Lufthansa Regional titles

In March 1992, DLT became a wholly owned subsidiary of Lufthansa and was renamed Lufthansa CityLine GmbH. In the following years other aircraft, common to the Lufthansa family, such as Avro RJ85 and other Avro RJ models entered the fleet. Parent company Lufthansa placed an order on 17 April 2007 for 30 Embraer E190/E195 and 15 Bombardier CRJ900 aircraft to directly replace CityLine's fleet of BAe 146s and Avro RJ aircraft. The last one took off from Cologne Bonn Airport on 27 August 2012 as LH1985. As of 31 December 2011 Lufthansa CityLine employed 2,332 people, of whom 664 were cockpit crew, 849 cabin crew and 819 work in the technical and administrative areas.

=== Development since 2014 ===
In late 2014, Lufthansa announced it would begin transferring eight of its Airbus A340-300 aircraft to CityLine. After reconfiguration to a high-density configuration, these aircraft would be owned by CityLine and operated by its pilots but wet-leased back to Lufthansa and serviced by Lufthansa cabin crews starting in 2015 for use on leisure routes. The Bombardier CRJ-700s left CityLine's fleet by March 2015. In October 2017, a new labour agreement between Lufthansa and its pilot unions was reached. As part of this agreement, the wetlease operations of CityLine on behalf of the parent, consisting of eight Airbus A340 aircraft, were gradually terminated.

As part of Lufthansa's new corporate design introduced in early 2018, Lufthansa Regional branded aircraft operated by Lufthansa CityLine also received the new livery, with the Lufthansa Regional titles being removed from the fuselage and replaced by just Lufthansa.

In August 2020, Lufthansa CityLine handed back six Airbus A340-300 longhaul aircraft as part of their revised leisure route strategy. In spring 2022, the airline transferred their last two remaining Embraer 195 to sister Air Dolomiti from Italy. In the same time, they were given operations of two Airbus A321P2F converted freighter aircraft on behalf of Lufthansa Cargo as well as several Airbus A319-100 aircraft to be flown for Lufthansa mainline. Additionally, Lufthansa announced in 2023 that they would relocate several of their A320neo to Lufthansa CityLine.

In June 2024, Lufthansa announced it would close Lufthansa CityLine in the foreseeable future, with plans to move all operations to Lufthansa City Airlines (already established in April 2022), stating agreements with unions prevent them from using larger aircraft at CityLine. In November 2024, the airline's labour union sued Lufthansa regarding the planned closure stating the similarity of the operations of its proposed successor. In October 2024, Lufthansa CityLine transferred all four of its Airbus A321-200/P2F to its sister company Lufthansa Cargo, for which it had them operated previously.

In February 2025, Lufthansa Group announced it would go ahead with the shutdown of Lufthansa CityLine in the foreseeable future with current staff being relocated to its replacement Lufthansa City Airlines.

=== Cessation of operations ===
On 16 April 2026, Lufthansa announced the permanent withdrawal of 27 aircraft from its CityLine subsidiary on 18 April. The airline cited surging fuel costs linked to the Middle Eastern conflict and ongoing labour disruptions as the primary reasons for the fleet reduction.

== Corporate affairs ==
The airline's corporate headquarters was at the Flight Operations Center (FOC) at Munich Airport. In May 2013, it was announced that the management and administration offices of CityLine would be relocated from Cologne to Munich. The move was completed as of September 2014.

The airline was previously headquartered at Cologne Bonn Airport. In 1998, the airline moved its offices to the security area of that airport; several of its departments however were in Munich. In 2009, the airline moved its head office into the former Cologne/Bonn Airport administrative building.

== Destinations ==
As of 2024, Lufthansa CityLine operated a network of 85 domestic and European destinations from the Lufthansa hubs at Frankfurt Airport and Munich Airport.

=== Codeshare agreements ===
Lufthansa CityLine maintained codeshare agreements with the following airlines:

- Lufthansa

=== Interline agreements ===
Lufthansa CityLine maintained interline agreements with the following airlines:

- Singapore Airlines

== Fleet ==
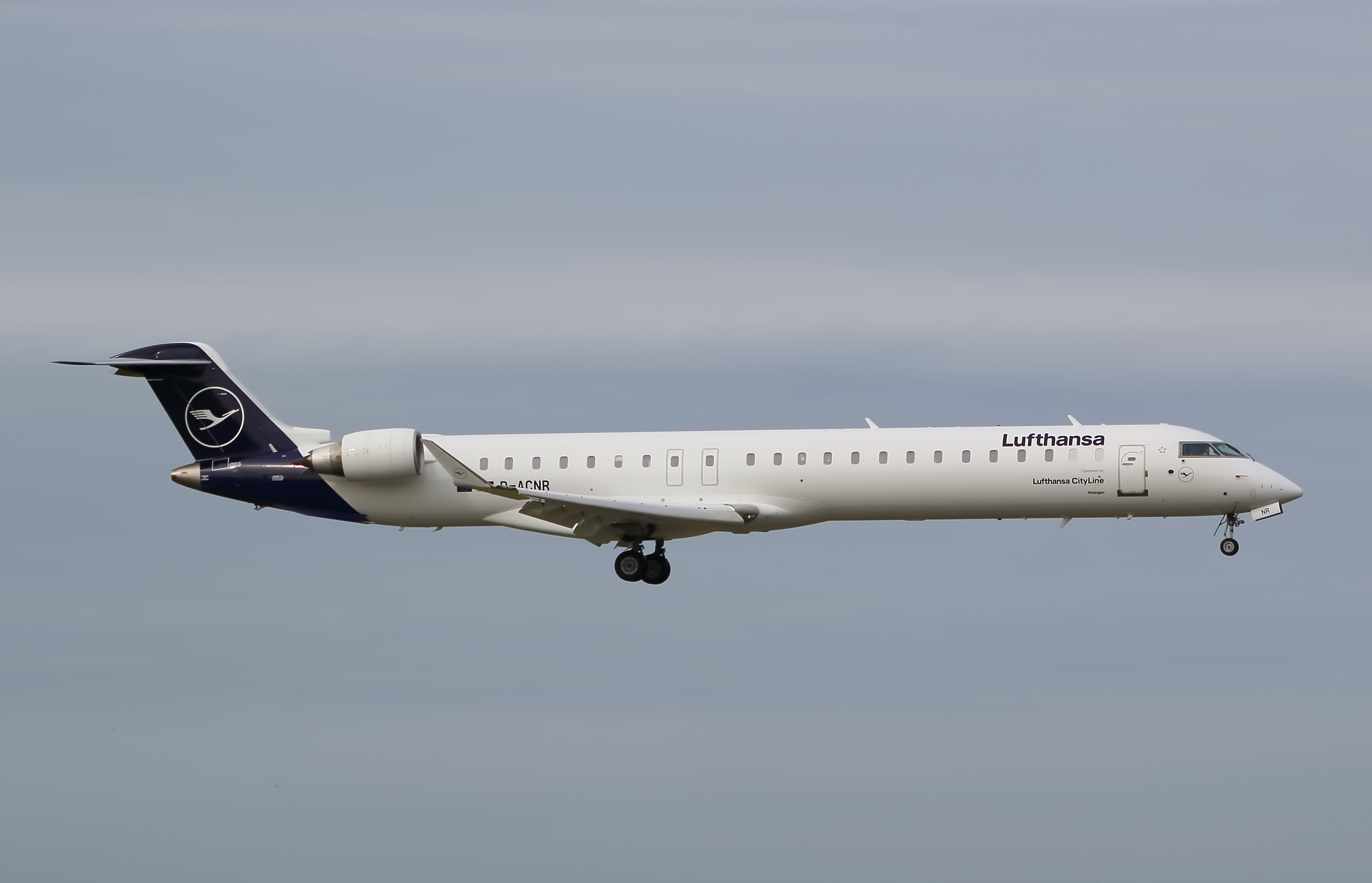
CRJ-900

=== Current fleet ===
As of April 2026, Lufthansa CityLine operated the following aircraft:

Aircraft	In service	Orders	Passengers			Notes
Aircraft	In service	Orders	J	Y	Total	Notes
Bombardier CRJ900	27	—	var		90	currently stored
Total	27	—				

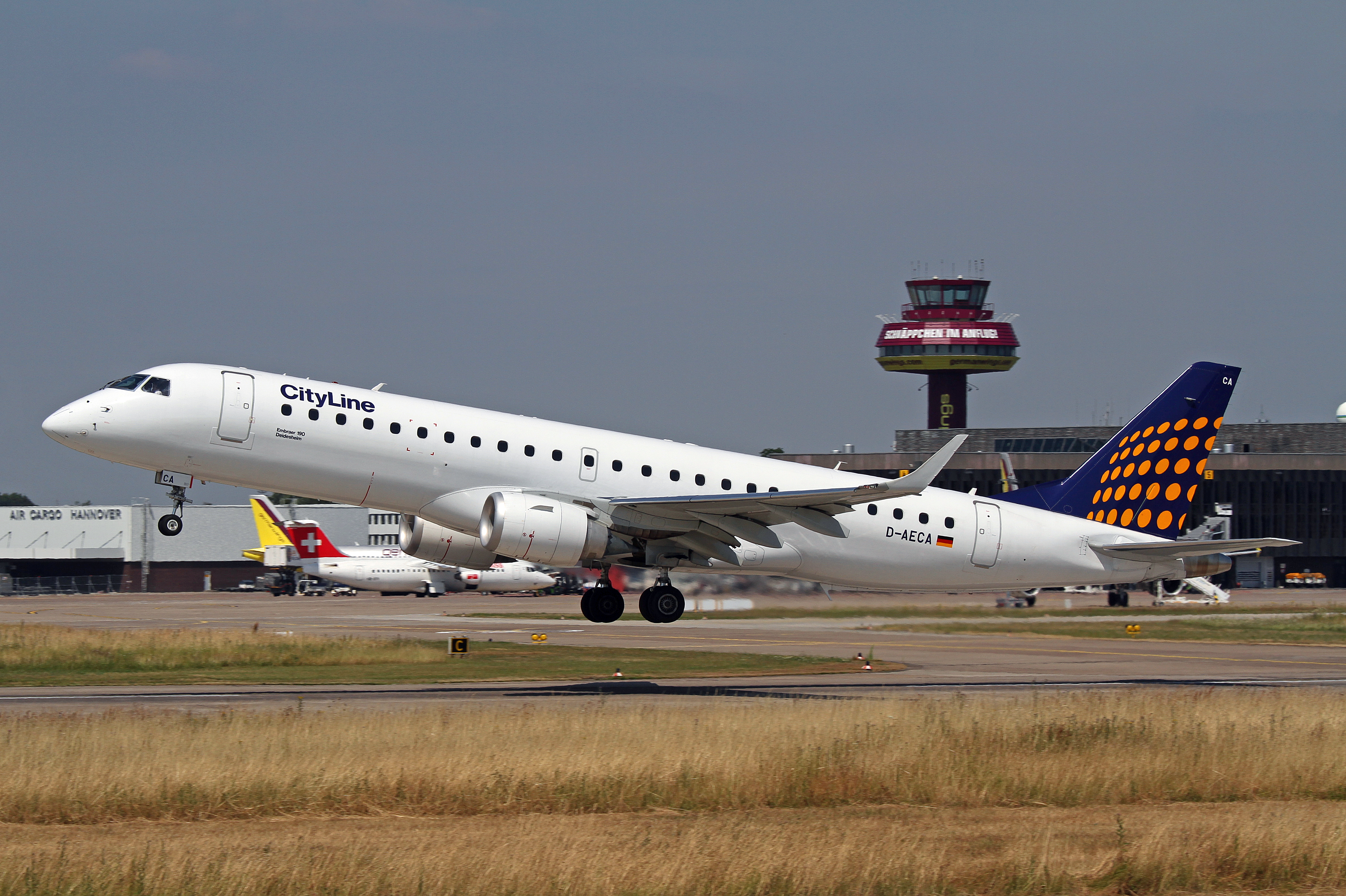
Former Embraer E190

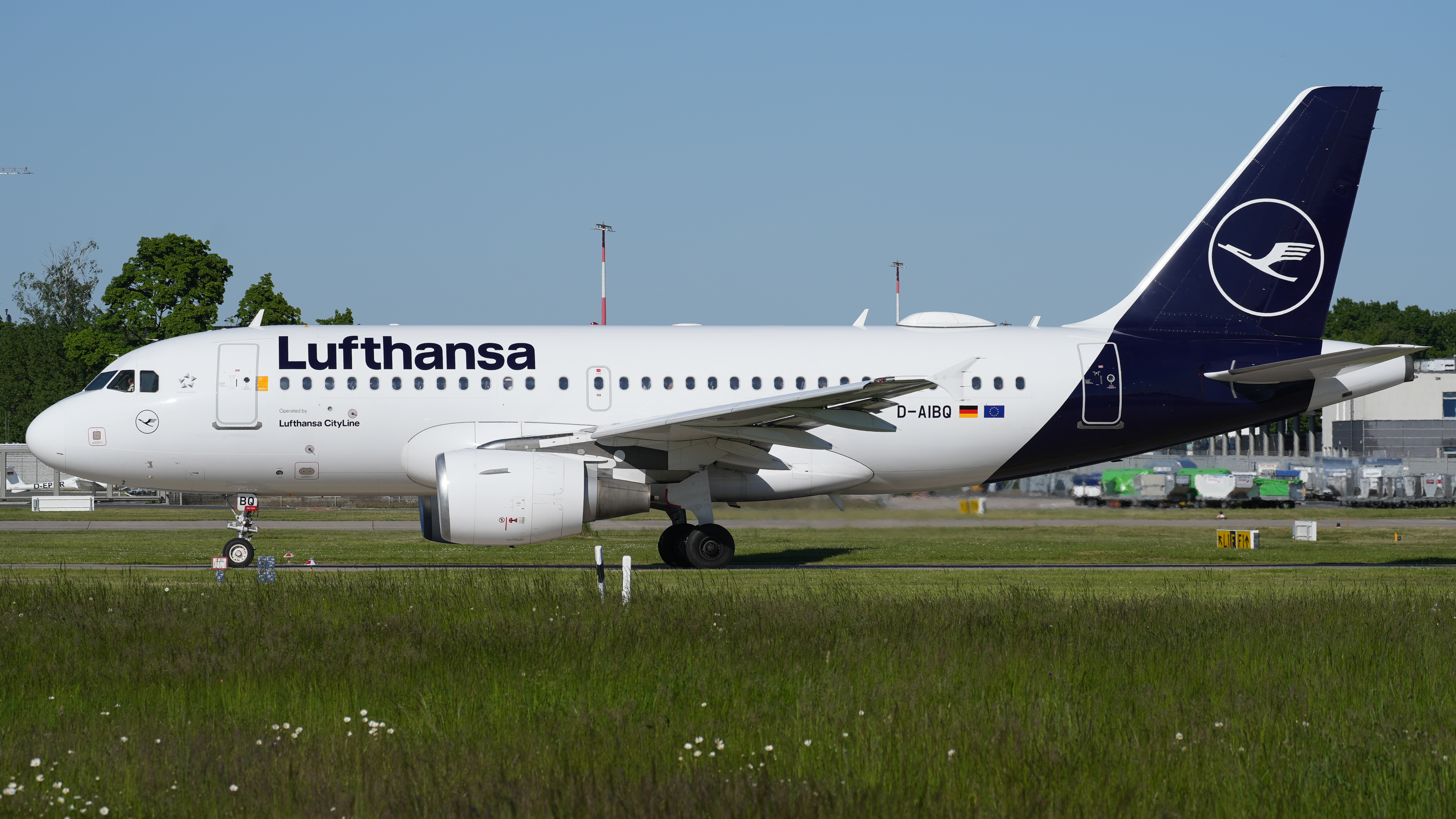
Former Airbus A319

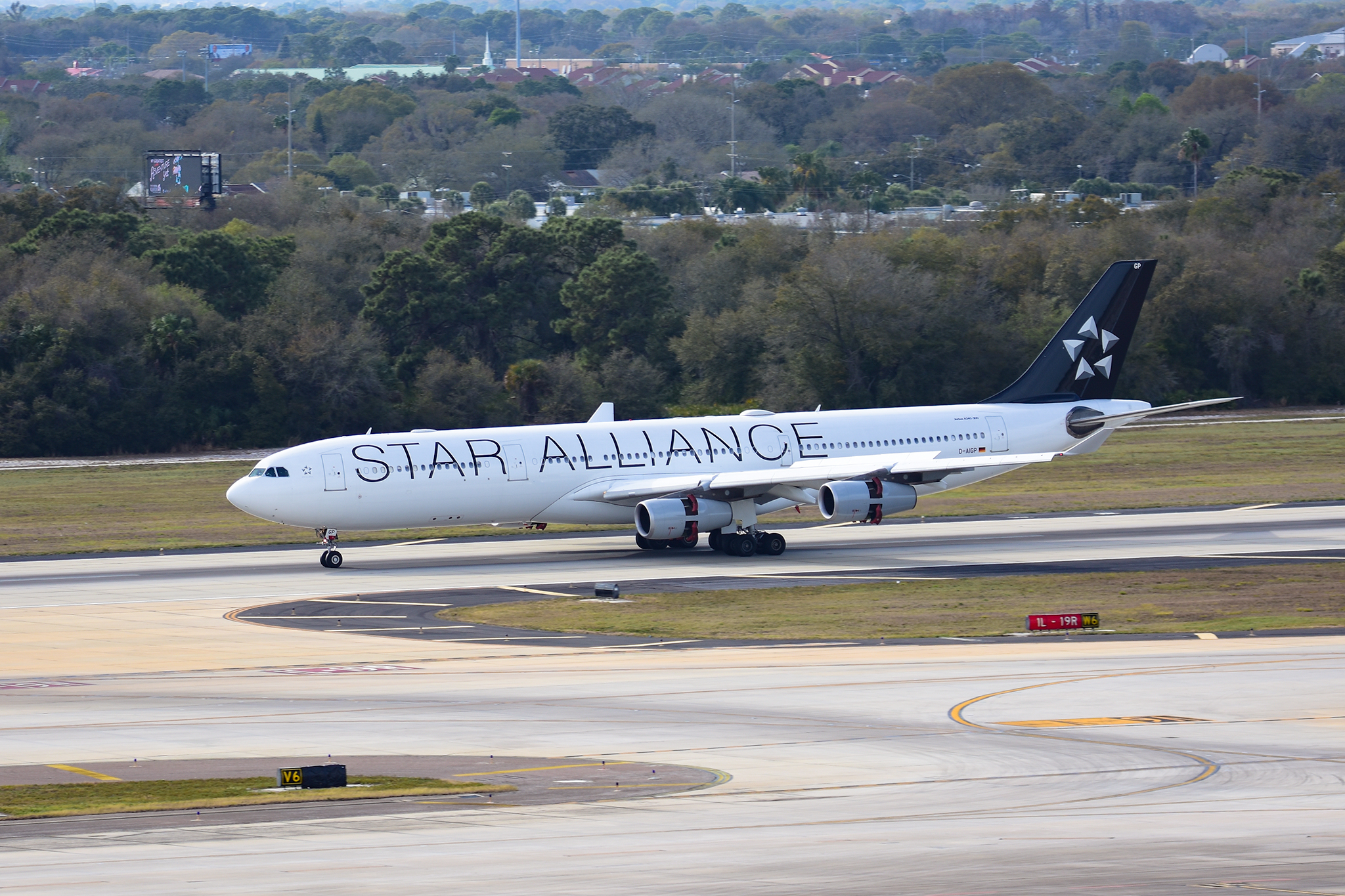
Former Airbus A340 in Star Alliance livery, lacking standard Lufthansa titles

=== Historical fleet ===
Over the years, Lufthansa CityLine has operated the following aircraft types:

Aircraft type	Introduced	Retired	Remarks
Airbus A319	—	—	
Airbus A320neo	2023	2025	Returned to Lufthansa
Airbus A321-200/P2F	2022	2024	Transferred to Lufthansa Cargo
Airbus A340-300	2015	2020	Returned to Lufthansa
ATR 42-300	1992	2002	Operated by Cimber Air
Avro RJ85	1994	2012	Returned to Lufthansa or transferred to Cityline Europe
Boeing 737-200	1992	1999	Inherited from DLT
Bombardier CRJ100	1992	2010	Returned to Lufthansa
Bombardier CRJ200	1992	2010	Returned to Lufthansa
Bombardier CRJ700	2001	2015	Returned to Lufthansa
De Havilland Canada Dash 8-100	1992	1997	Inherited from DLT. Operated by Cimber Air
De Havilland Canada Dash 8-300	1992	1997	Inherited from DLT. Operated by Cimber Air
Embraer 190	2009	2024	Transferred to Air Dolomiti
Embraer 195	2009	2022	Transferred to Air Dolomiti
Fokker 50	1992	1997	Operated by Cimber Air

== Accidents and incidents ==
- On 6 January 1993, Lufthansa Flight 5634 from Bremen to Paris, which was carried out under the Lufthansa CityLine brand using a Contact Air Dash 8-300 (registered D-BEAT), hit the ground 1800 metres short of the runway of Paris-Charles de Gaulle Airport, resulting in the death of four out of the 23 passengers on board. The four crew members survived. The accident occurred after the pilot had to abort the final approach to the airport because the runway had been closed due to the aircraft ahead, a Korean Air Boeing 747, suffering a blown tire upon landing.
- On 28 December 1999, a passenger on board Lufthansa Flight 5293 from Prague to Düsseldorf, which was operated by Lufthansa CityLine using a Bombardier CRJ100 aircraft (registered D-ACJA), claimed to have a bomb on board and demanded the flight be diverted to the United Kingdom. The pilots convinced him to have a fuel stop at Düsseldorf Airport, where all passengers left the plane (many of them unaware of the hijacking attempt), and the perpetrator was arrested.
- On 5 July 2014, Lufthansa Flight 1360 from Frankfurt to Katowice, operated by Lufthansa CityLine using a Bombardier CRJ700 aircraft (registered D-ACPJ), landed on an unopened and under construction runway at Katowice Airport. The pilots performed a normal approach from the East in good conditions and visibility before landing on the closed runway. No one was hurt, and the aircraft later made a technical flight to land on the correct runway. The Polish State Commission on Aircraft Accidents Investigation made recommendations to add additional markings to the runway (in the form of red X shapes on the runway), and to modify the ATIS to include warnings about the closed runway. The CAT I ILS was disabled due to the construction, and the aircraft featured an older EGPWS that lacked a "Smart Landing" mode and high resolution map of the area which prevented it from informing the crew of the situation. During the approach, PAPI and threshold lights were set to maximum brightness. The incident is still being investigated by Polish authorities.
