= Hof–Plauen Airport =

Airport in Bavaria, Germany

Hof–Plauen Airport Flughafen Hof–Plauen
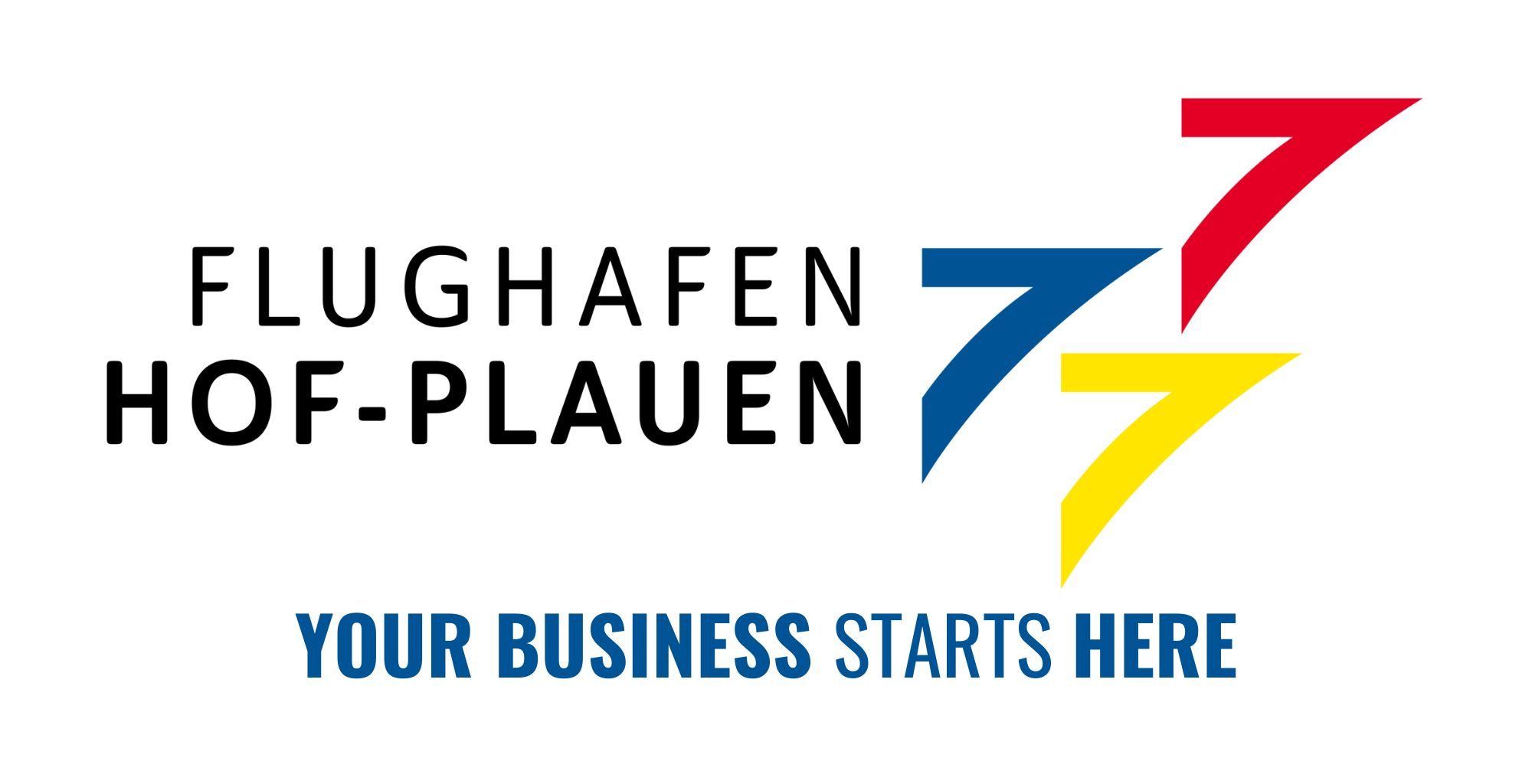

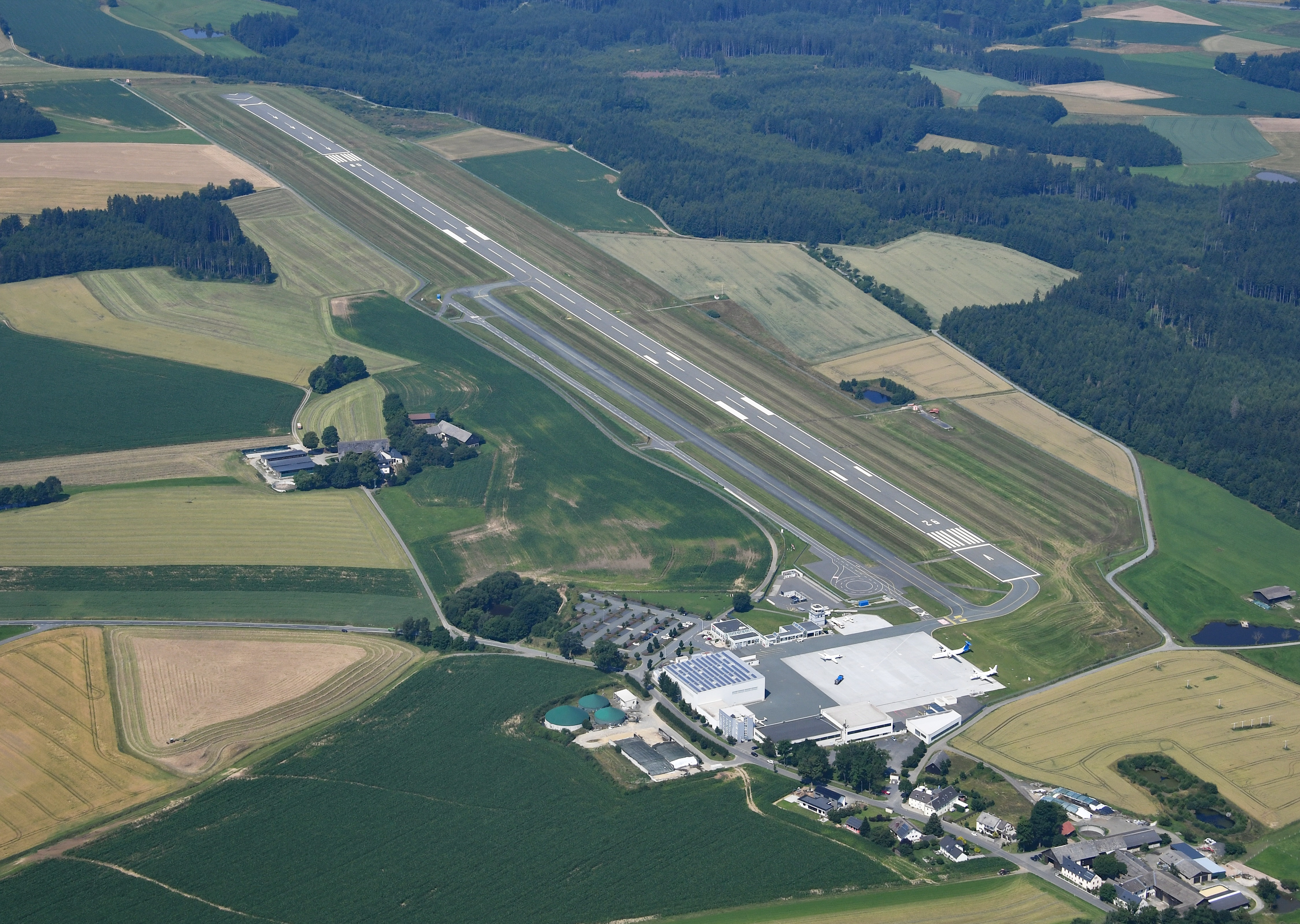
- IATA: HOQ; ICAO: EDQM

Summary
- Airport type: Public
- Owner: City of Hof
- Operator: Flughafen Hof-Plauen GmbH
- Serves: Hof, Germany
- Elevation AMSL: 1,960 ft (600 m)
- Coordinates: 50°17′24″N 011°51′23″E
- Website: flughafen-hof-plauen.de

Map
- Location of airport in Bavaria, Germany

Runways
Direction	Length		Surface
Direction	m	ft	Surface
08/26	1,480	4,856	Asphalt
- Sources: Airport, AIRPORTS.DE, DAFIF; AIP at German air traffic control.

Hof–Plauen Airport (German: Flughafen Hof–Plauen) (IATA: HOQ, ICAO: EDQM) is a regional airport serving Hof, a city in the German state of Bavaria. The airport is located 3.2 nautical miles (6 km) southwest of Hoq

.

== Facilities ==
The airport is at an elevation of 1,958 feet (597 m) above mean sea level. It has one runway designated 08/26 with an asphalt surface measuring 1,480 by 30 metres (4,856 ft × 98 ft).

== Airlines and destinations ==
There are currently no scheduled services to and from Hof–Plauen Airport. The last route was operated by Cirrus Airlines on behalf of Lufthansa to Frankfurt Airport and ceased in January 2012. Since then, there were only charter and business flights. In 2017, there were around 7,000 departures and landings. The airport and the runway is also used by BMW for testing new cars, mostly electric cars and autonomous driving.

== See also ==
- Transport in Germany
- List of airports in Germany
