= Team Lufthansa =

Alliance of regional airlines mainly in Germany

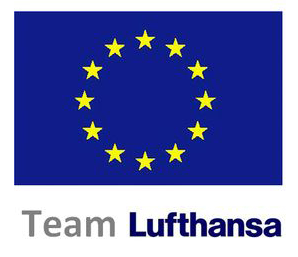
IATA	ICAO	Call sign
LH	DLH	LUFTHANSA
- Founded: April 1996
- Ceased operations: 16 October 2003
- Parent company: Lufthansa Group

Team Lufthansa was an alliance of regional airlines which flew niche routes on behalf of Lufthansa. It was replaced with Lufthansa Regional in 2003.

== Overview ==
Team Lufthansa was founded in 1996 by Lufthansa in the wake of the deregulation of the airline market as new competitors like Deutsche BA challenged established airlines. Besides connecting point-to-point destinations, the alliance also provided Lufthansa flights on niche routes from Frankfurt and Munich.

The founding members were later expanded by the accession of Rheintalflug, Air Littoral and Cirrus Airlines and since consisted of airlines from Germany, Denmark, Austria and France.

The alliance ceased to exist in 2003, when Lufthansa reorganized its regional network as Lufthansa Regional.

== Members ==
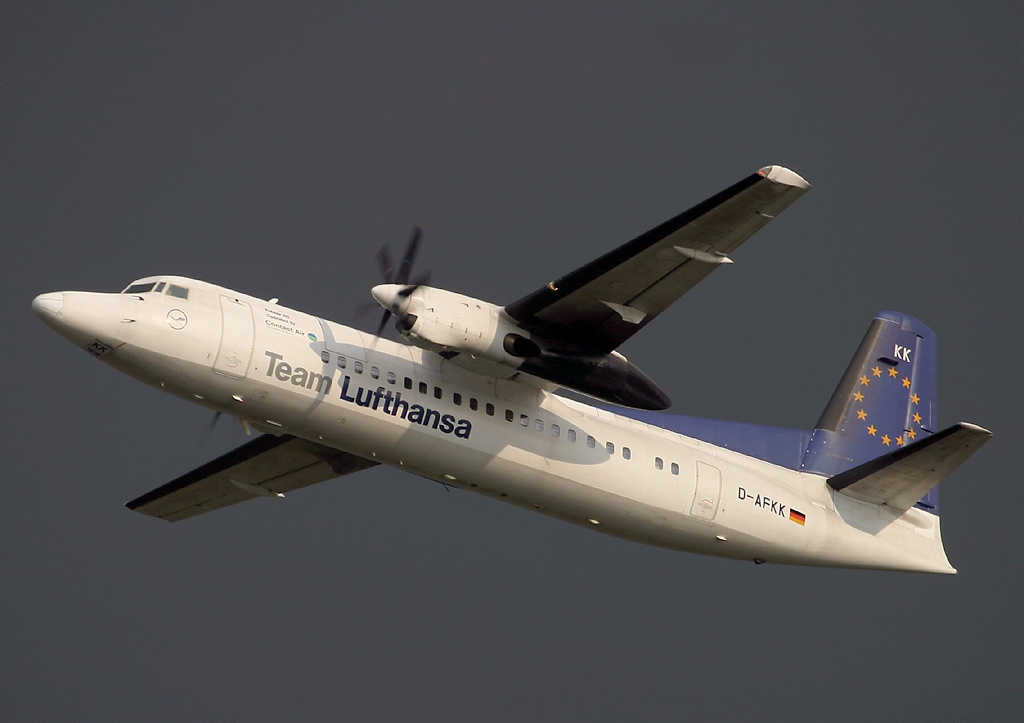
A Fokker 50 of Contact Air, operating as part of Team Lufthansa in 2003.

The member airlines of Team Lufthansa were:

- (Denmark) Cimber Air
- (Germany) Augsburg Airways
- (Germany) Contact Air
- (Germany) Cirrus Airlines
- (France) Air Littoral
- (Austria) Rheintalflug

== See also ==
Media related to Team Lufthansa at Wikimedia Commons
