= Air hockey =

Tabletop sport

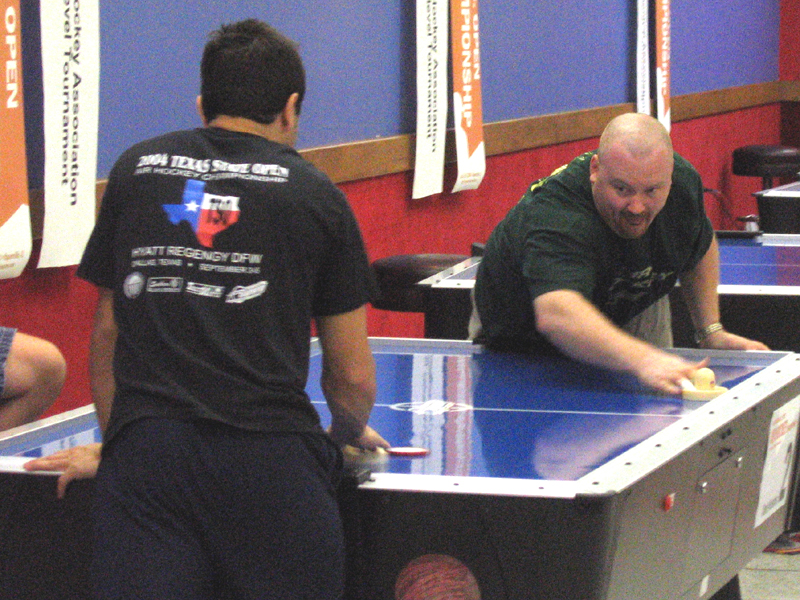
- World Champions Ehab Shoukry and Danny Hynes face off at the 2005 National Championships
- Years active: 1973 to present
- Genres: Electro-mechanical, arcade, table sport, bar sport
- Players: 2
- Skills: Dexterity, agility, hand-eye coordination, reaction time

Air hockey is a tabletop sport where two opposing players try to score goals against each other on a low-friction table using two hand-held discs (mallets/pushers) and a lightweight plastic puck.

The air hockey table features raised edges that allow the puck to rebound horizontally—governed by the rule that the angle of incidence equals the angle of reflection. Furthermore, the exceptionally smooth surface virtually eliminates friction by suspending the puck on a thin cushion of air ejected from tiny vent holes. This allows the puck to hover and glide effortlessly with minimal velocity loss, simulating a lubricated ice hockey puck on a polished rink, which gives the game its name.

== Federations ==
- United States Air Hockey Association (USAA) – 1978
- Air Hockey Players Association (AHPA) – 2015
- North Carolina Air Hockey Player Association (NCAHP) – 2016
- American Air Hockey League (AAHL) – 2024
- European Air Hockey Association (EAHA) 2006–2007
- World Table Hockey Association (WTHA) – multi-table table sports organisation based in Czech Republic. Since 2008, it organises air hockey competitions in Europe.

== History ==
=== Origins ===
Air hockey is a game resting on an older technology, the air table. Air tables began as a conveyor technology, allowing heavy objects like cardboard boxes to easily slide over a table surface. The original air tables of the 1940s had rather large holes that were plugged by ball bearings. An object sitting on the table would depress the balls, allowing air to escape and lift the object slightly off the table.

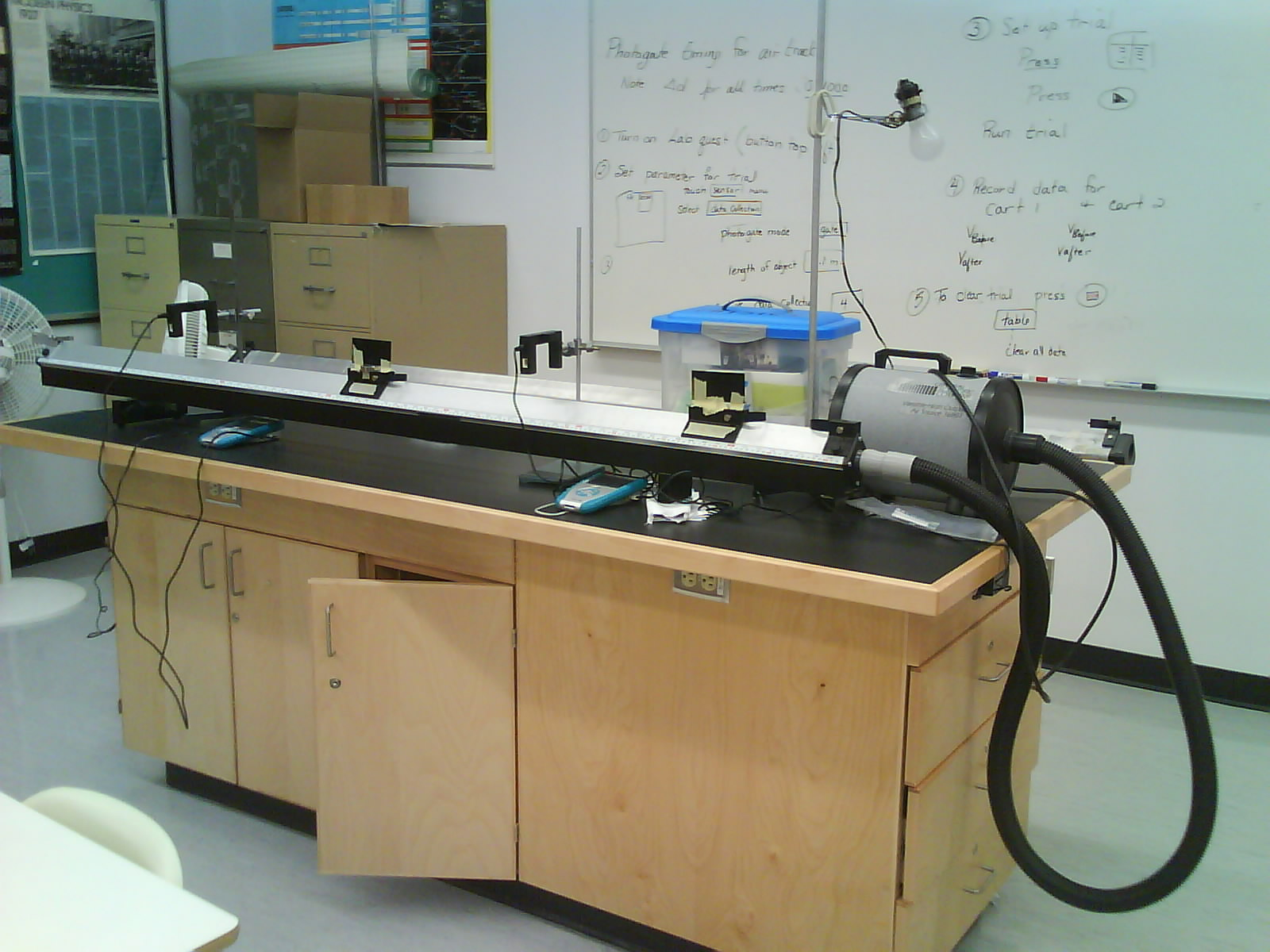
An air track, as designed by John Stull. This technology formed the basis of later air hockey games.

In the early 1960s, physicists began designing and building crude air tracks for educational purposes. John Stull, a professor at Alfred University, created a simple low-friction air track using a vacuum cleaner under a flat surface perforated by small holes. Stull partnered with the Ealing Corporation, which further developed the idea.

In 1968, Sega released an arcade electro-mechanical game similar to air hockey, MotoPolo. Based on polo, two players moved miniature motorbikes around inside a cabinet, with each player attempting to knock the balls into the opponent's goal.

By the late 1960s, Ealing developed a tabletop with a sandwich of fiberboard or plexiglass sheets separated by a honeycomb structure. The top surface was drilled with a grid of small holes, and the space between the boards was supplied with low-pressure compressed air, just enough to allow "air pucks" to float over the surface.

=== Creation ===
Air hockey was created by a group of Brunswick Billiards employees between 1969 and 1972. In 1969, a trio of Brunswick engineers – Phil Crossman, Bob Kenrick and Brad Baldwin – began work on creating a game using a low-friction surface. The project stagnated for several years until it was revived by Bob Lemieux, who then focused on implementing an abstracted version of ice hockey, including a thin disc, two strikers and slit-like goals equipped with photodetectors. It was then decided that the game might appeal to a larger market and air hockey was marketed and sold to the general public. The original patents reference Crossman, Kendrick and Lemieux, as well as Ealing's earlier work on air tables.

The game was an immediate financial success, and by the mid-1970s there was interest in tournament play. As early as 1973, players in Houston had formed the Houston Air Hockey Association, and soon thereafter, the Texas Air-Hockey Players Association, codifying rules and promoting the sport through local tournaments at Houston pubs Carnabys and Damians, and the University of Houston.

=== Competitions ===
The United States Air-Table Hockey Association (USAA) was formed in 1975 by J. Phillip "Phil" Arnold, largely as an official sanctioning body. Since its inception, the USAA has sanctioned at least one national-level or World championship each year, crowning 12 different champions over 30 years. In March 2015, the Air Hockey Players Association (AHPA) was announced and is providing air hockey players with an additional organization also overseeing the sport of air hockey. The two organizations run independently but abide by a similar set of rules and share many of the same players. In July 2015, the AHPA crowned its first world champion and also the youngest in the history of the sport in Colin Cummings of Beaumont, Texas.

Today, professional air hockey is played by a close-knit community of serious players around the world, Having 4 main scenes in the US: Houston, North Carolina, Chicago and Boise; Barcelona in Spain; Saint Petersburg, Moscow, and Novgorod in Russia; and Most and Brno in the Czech Republic. In the late 1980s, Caracas, Venezuela, served as a hotbed of activity; three-time World Champion Jose Mora and four-time finalist Pedro Otero originated from there. By 1999, most of the Venezuelan activity had disappeared.

== Air hockey tables ==
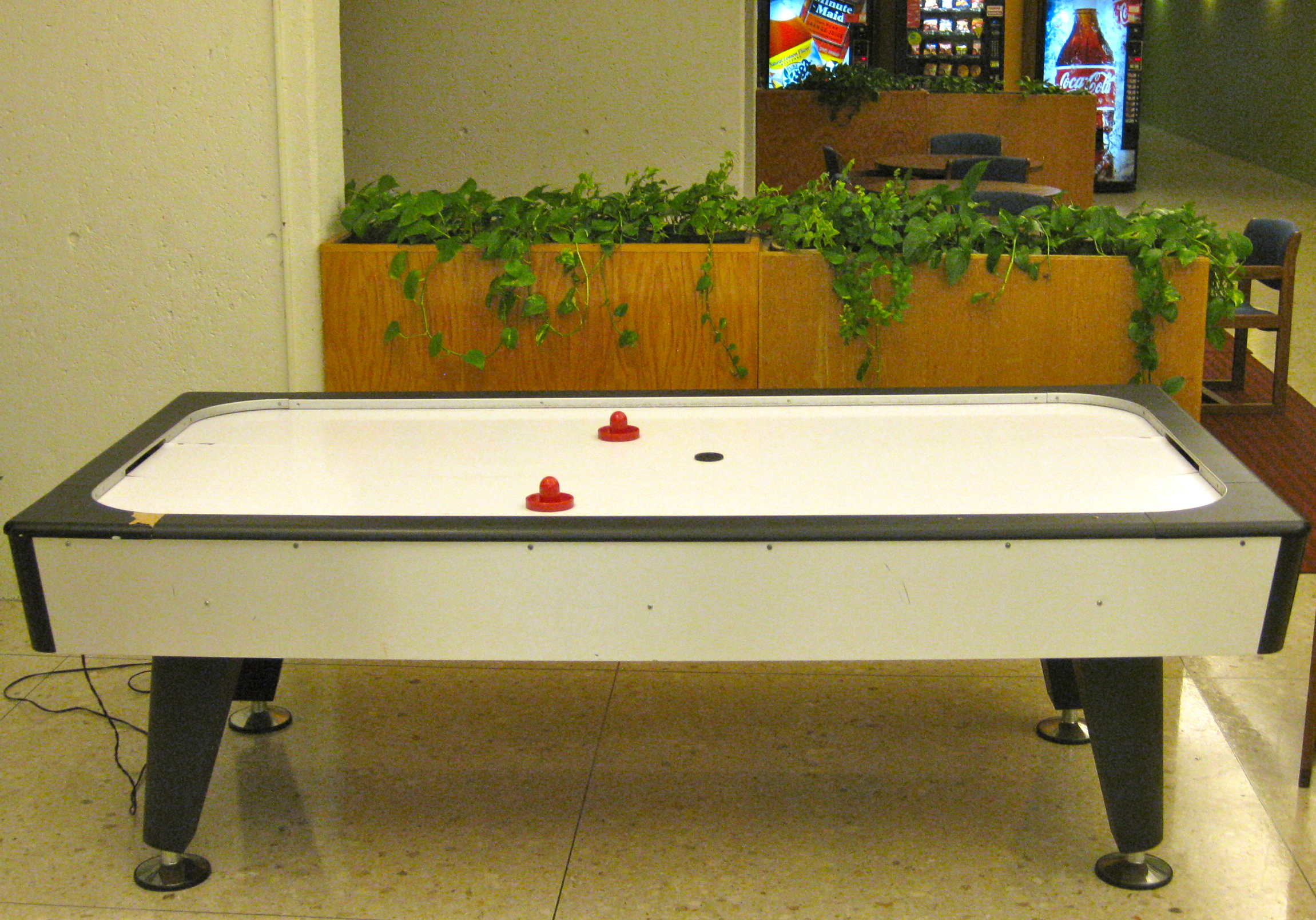
An air hockey table in Currier House

A typical air hockey table consists of a large smooth playing surface designed to minimize friction, a surrounding rail to prevent the puck and mallets from leaving the table, and slots in the rail at either end of the table that serve as goals. On the ends of the table behind and below the goals, there is usually a puck return. Additionally, tables will typically have some sort of machinery that produces a cushion of air on the playing surface through tiny holes, with the purpose of reducing friction and increasing play speed.

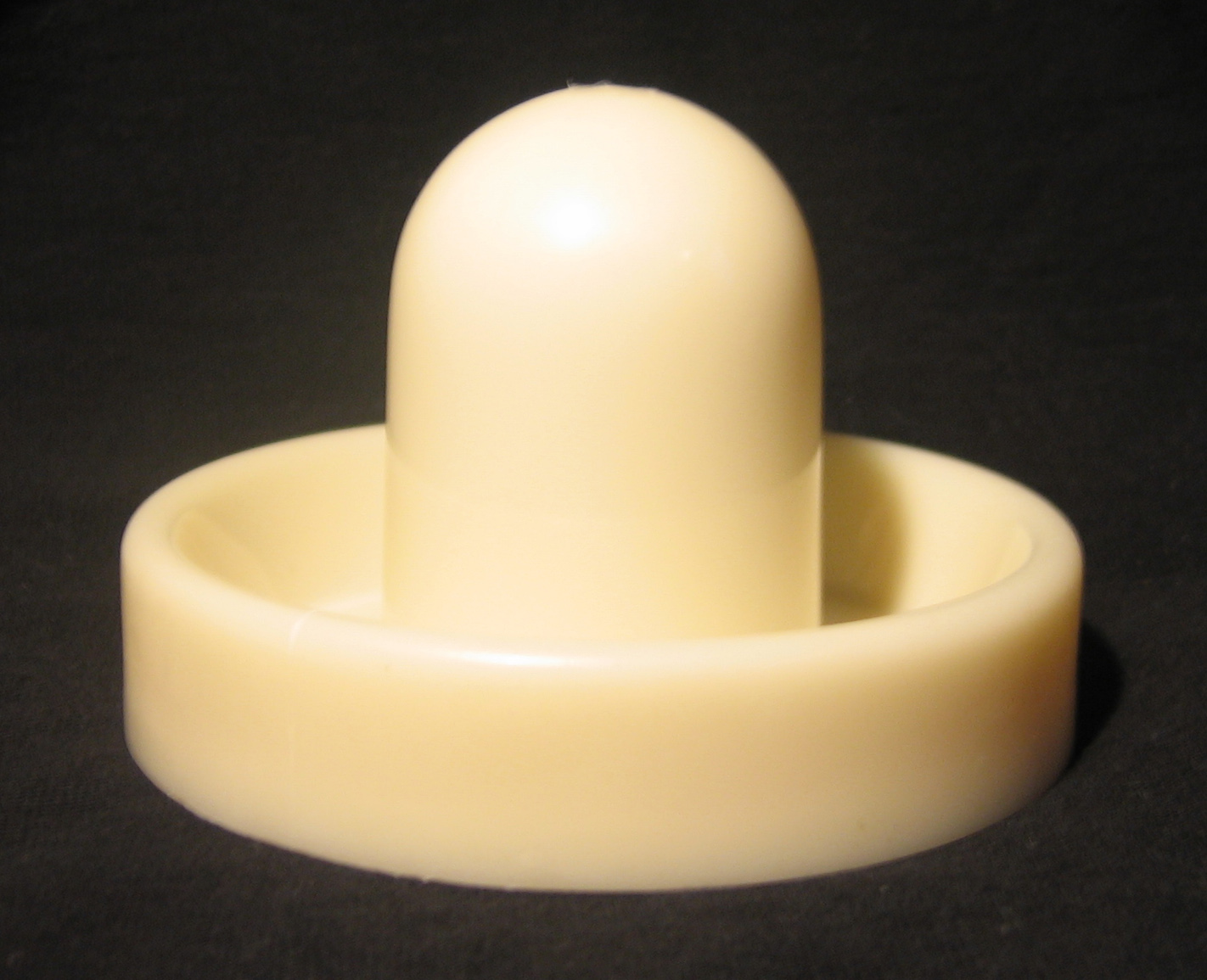
Air hockey mallet

The only tables that are approved for play and sanctioned by the USAA (United States Air Hockey Association) and the AHPA (Air Hockey Players Association) for tournament play are 8-foot tables. Approved tables include all Gold Standard Games 8-foot tables; some 8-foot tables from Dynamo; and the original 8-foot commercial Brunswick tables. Other full-size novelty-type tables with flashing lights on the field of play, painted rails, and/or smaller pucks are not approved for tournament play. There are also smaller air hockey tables having a size of 1.5, 2, or 2.5 feet, called mini air hockey tables.

The characteristic sound of air hockey

A mallet (sometimes called a goalie, striker or paddle) consists of a simple handle attached to a flat surface that will usually lie flush with the surface of the table. The most common mallets, called "high-tops", resemble small plastic sombreros, but other mallets, "flat-tops", are used with a shorter nub.

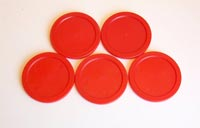
A group of five air hockey pucks

Air hockey pucks are discs made of Lexan polycarbonate resin. Standard USAA and AHPA-approved pucks are yellow, red, and green. In competitive play, a layer of thin white tape is placed on the face-up side. Air hockey pucks come in circles and other shapes (triangle, hexagon, octagon, or square).

Four-player tables also exist, but they are not sanctioned for competitive play.

== Rules ==
The basic rules of play are listed as follows:

- The first player to reach 7 points wins the game
- First possession of the puck is determined by a face off
- Players may strike the puck with any part of the mallet, and each player can only use one mallet at a time
- Players have seven seconds to complete a shot towards the opposing goal
- Once scored on, the player has ten seconds to return the puck back into play
- When the puck is in contact with any part of the centerline, either player may strike the puck
- Players can position themselves anywhere around the table as long as they stay on their side of the centerline
- Each player is permitted a ten-second time out each match, and must be called by the player when they are in possession of the puck, or the puck is out of play
- "Palming" or any use of the hand in contact with the puck is not permitted
- Placing the mallet on top of the puck to stop it is prohibited
- Contact with the puck by any part of the player's body or a foreign object (such as a shirt) is prohibited
- Players cannot hit the puck off the table

Fouls are issued to players who violate any of the rules. The player who receives the foul must turn possession of the puck over to the opponent.

Technical fouls are issued for more severe violations, such as goal tending with the hand. When a technical foul is called, the opposing player is given a free shot on the offender's goal. The offender is not allowed to defend the shot, but can resume play if the shot misses and bounces off their end of the table.

== Gameplay ==
Competitive (tournament) play is usually distinguished by the following:

- The mallet is gripped behind the knob using one's fingertips, not on top of it. This allows more wrist action and helps the player to move the mallet around the table faster.
- For basic defense, the mallet is kept centered at least 8 inches out from the goal. In this position, very slight movements to the left and right will block virtually all straight shots. To block bank shots, one pulls back quickly to the corners of the goal. This is known as the "triangle defense".
- Shots are often hit out of "drifts", where the puck travels in set patterns designed to throw off the opponent's expectations and timing. The most popular drifts are the "center", "diamond", "diagonal", and "L".
- Shots are often organized into groups of shots which are hit with the same apparent delivery but opposite directions, caused by hitting the puck at slightly different locations on the mallet. For example, a transverse motion of the right arm can lead to a "cut shot" to the left corner of the opponent's goal or a "right wall under" (bank off the right wall, into the right corner of the opponent's goal).

== Competitive air hockey ==
=== Tournament history ===
==== USAA World Championships ====
Source: 1978-2009

USAA Air Hockey World Championships by Houston-based United States Air Hockey Association (USAA):

1. World Singles Championship Since 1978
2. World Doubles Championship Since 1995

Year	Champion	Runner-up	Third Place
1978	Jesse Douty	Phil Arnold	Rolf Moore
1979	Jesse Douty	Phil Arnold	Joe Campbell
1980	Jesse Douty	Phil Arnold	Joe Campbell
1980	Jesse Douty	Robert Hernandez	Mark Robbins
1981	Jesse Douty	Bob Dubuisson	Paul Marshall
1981	Bob Dubuisson	Paul Burger	Jesse Douty
1982	Jesse Douty	Mark Robbins	Bob Dubuisson
1983	Jesse Douty	Mark Robbins	Bob Dubuisson
1983	Bob Dubuisson	Jesse Douty	Phil Arnold
1984	Jesse Douty	Phil Arnold	Mark Robbins
1984	Mark Robbins	Robert Hernandez	Bob Dubuisson
1985	Bob Dubuisson	Robert Hernandez	Vince Schappell
1985	Bob Dubuisson	Robert Hernandez	Mark Robbins
1986	Robert Hernandez	Bob Dubuisson	Mark Robbins
1986	Mark Robbins	Bob Dubuisson	Robert Hernandez
1987	Robert Hernandez	Jesse Douty	Phil Arnold
1987	Jesse Douty	Mark Robbins	Robert Hernandez
1988	Jesse Douty	Bob Dubuisson	Robert Hernandez
1988	Jesse Douty	Bob Dubuisson	Joe Campbell
1989	Tim Weissman	Bob Dubuisson	Jesse Douty
1989	Tim Weissman	Jesse Douty	Robert Hernandez
1990	Tim Weissman	Jesse Douty	Robert Hernandez
1990	Tim Weissman	Phil Arnold	Mark Robbins
1991	Tim Weissman	Jesse Douty	Albert Ortiz
1991	Tim Weissman	Mark Robbins	Robert Hernandez
1992	Tim Weissman	Robert Hernandez	Mark Robbins
1993	Tim Weissman	Keith Fletcher	Vince Schappell
1993	Tim Weissman	Andy Yevish	Keith Fletcher
1994	Owen Giraldo	Mark Robbins	Tim Weissman
1995	Billy Stubbs	Wil Upchurch	Don James
1996	Tim Weissman	Wil Upchurch	Andy Yevish
1997	Wil Upchurch	Tim Weissman	Jesse Douty
1998	José Mora	Pedro Otero	Tim Weissman
1999	José Mora	Pedro Otero	Jimmy Heilander
2000	José Mora	Pedro Otero	Tim Weissman
2001	Danny Hynes	Tim Weissman	José Mora
2002	Danny Hynes	Ehab Shoukry	Billy Stubbs
2003	Ehab Shoukry	José Mora	Andy Yevish
2004	Danny Hynes	Andy Yevish	Anthony Marino
2004	Danny Hynes	Ehab Shoukry	Don James
2005	Danny Hynes	Billy Stubbs	Anthony Marino
2006	Danny Hynes	Wil Upchurch	Davis Lee
2007	Davis Lee	Keith Fletcher	Ehab Shoukry
2007	Wil Upchurch	Davis Lee	Keith Fletcher
2008	Danny Hynes	Ehab Shoukry	José Mora
2009	Ehab Shoukry	Davis Lee	Keith Fletcher
2009	Danny Hynes	Ehab Shoukry	José Mora
2010	Davis Lee	Billy Stubbs	Anthony Marino
2011	Danny Hynes	Ehab Shoukry	Billy Stubbs
2011	Danny Hynes	Ehab Shoukry	Billy Stubbs
2012	Billy Stubbs	Danny Hynes	Ehab Shoukry
2012	Billy Stubbs	Ehab Shoukry	Tim Weissman
2013	Danny Hynes	Davis Lee	Pedro Otero
2014	Billy Stubbs	Davis Lee	Danny Hynes
2015	Colin Cummings	Pedro Otero	Danny Hynes
2016	Colin Cummings	Danny Hynes	Brian Accrocco
2017	Jacob Weissman	Vadim Chizhevskiy	Colin Cummings
2018	Colin Cummings	Vincent Sauceda	Danny Hynes
2019	Colin Cummings	Vincent Sauceda	Jacob Weissman
2019	Colin Cummings	Vincent Sauceda	Keith Fletcher
2021	Colin Cummings	Jacob Weissman	Jacob Muñoz
2022	Colin Cummings	Jacob Weissman	Marcelo García
2023	Colin Cummings	Jacob Weissman	Pete Lippincott
2024	Colin Cummings	Jacob Muñoz	Jacob Weissman
2025	Jacob Muñoz	Colin Cummings	Connor Cummings

==== USAA Women's World Championship ====
Year	Champion	Runner-up	Third place
1980	Barbara Marquis		
1981	Barbara Marquis		
1982	Barbara Marquis		
1983	Barbara Marquis	Patrice Nale	
1984	Barbara Marquis	Patrice Nale	
1985	Barbara Marquis	Patrice Nale	
1986	Patrice Nale		
1987	Patrice Nale		
1988	Patrice Nale	Sharon Wright	Connie Rector
1989	Patrice Nale	Connie Rector	
1990	Kara Klyn	Natalie Wollert	
1991	Patrice Nale		
1991	Cathy Brown	Kara Klyn	
1992	Patrice Nale	Lisa Marie Hager	
1993	Kara Klyn		
1993	Kara Klyn		
1994	Kara Klyn	Yuriko Hirano	
1996	Patrice Nale	Gretchen Denner-Adams	
2000	Niki Jacquette	Claudia Magaña	
2001	Niki Jacquette	Claudia Magaña	Barbara Marquis
2023	Sarah Weissman-Griffith	Angie DiMauro	
2024	Angie DiMauro	Krista Marino	
2025	Sarah Weissman-Griffith	Lilo Daher	

USAA Doubles World Championship

Year	Champions	Runners-Up
1995	Tim Weissman/Don James	Wil Upchurch/John Rufener
1996	Tim Weissman/Don James	Wil Upchurch/Jesse Douty
1997	Tim Weissman/Don James	Wil Upchurch/Scot Morgan
1998	Tim Weissman/Don James	United States
1999	Tim Weissman/Don James	United States
2000	Wil Upchurch/Brian Accrocco	Danny Hynes/Ehab Shoukry
2001	Tim Weissman/Don James	Danny Hynes/Ehab Shoukry
2002	Owen Giraldo/Billy Stubbs	Danny Hynes/Ehab Shoukry
2003	Brian Accrocco/Anthony Marino	Danny Hynes/Ehab Shoukry
2004	Danny Hynes/Ehab Shoukry	Tim Weissman/Don James
2005	Danny Hynes/Ehab Shoukry	United States
2006	Danny Hynes/Ehab Shoukry	Wil Upchurch/Brian Accrocco
2007	Davis Lee/Mark Nizzi	Brian Accrocco/Anthony Marino
2007	Wil Upchurch/Keith Fletcher	Davis Lee/Mark Nizzi
2008	Danny Hynes/Ehab Shoukry	Davis Lee/Joe Cain
2009	Danny Hynes/Pat Gill	James Scott Britton/Fernando
2010	Ehab Shoukry/Davis Lee	Danny Hynes/Anthony Marino
2011	Danny Hynes/Ehab Shoukry	Billy Stubbs/Davis Lee
2011	Billy Stubbs/Tim Weissman	Danny Hynes/Ehab Shoukry
2012	Danny Hynes/Ehab Shoukry	Davis Lee/Mark Nizzi
2013	Danny Hynes/Ehab Shoukry	United States
2014	Brian Quezada/Dan Meyer	Keith Fletcher/Chris Lee
2015	Danny Hynes/Ehab Shoukry	Colin Cummings/Andy Yevish
2016	Brian Quezada/Dan Meyer	Pedro Otero/Marcelo Garcia
2017	Danny Hynes/Brian Accrocco	Vadim Chizhevskiy/ Mark Waheed
2018	Colin Cummings/Mike Cummings	Danny Hynes/Doug Howard
2019	Colin Cummings/Brian Accrocco	Tim Weissman/Jacob Weissman
2019	Colin Cummings/Steven Accrocco	Brian Accrocco/Austin Fernandes
2021	Colin Cummings/Jacob Munoz	Brian Accrocco/Austin Fernandes
2022	Jacob Weissman/Jacob Munoz	Colin Cummings/Meg Cummings
2023	Colin Cummings/Ben Hayman	Jacob Weissman/Avery Yebernetsky
2024	Connor Cummings/Noah Weissman	Billy Stubbs/Vince Sauceda
2025	Jacob Weissman/Brian Quezada	Connor Cummings/Noah Weissman

==== AHPA World Championship ====
Air Hockey Players Association (AHPA) - Air Hockey World Championship

Year	Champion	Runner-up	Third place
2015	Colin Cummings	Billy Stubbs	Brian Accrocco
2016	Colin Cummings	Brian Accrocco	Doug Howard
2017	Colin Cummings	Vincent Sauceda	Brian Accrocco

==== AHPA Doubles World Championship ====
Year	Champions	Runners-up
2015	Colin Cummings/Chris Lee	United States
2016	Colin Cummings/Connor Cummings	Mike Cummings/Justin Flores
2017	Colin Cummings/Austin Fernandes	Keith Fletcher/Joe Cain

==== Texas State Open ====
Year	Champion	Runner-up	Third place
1982	Phil Arnold	Mike Pryor	Robert Hernandez
1983	Robert Hernandez	Phil Arnold	Paul Marshall
1987	Robert Hernandez	Paul Marshall	
1988	Tim Weissman	Robert Hernandez	
1989	Tim Weissman	Mark Robbins	
1990	Tim Weissman	Albert Ortiz	Wil Upchurch
1991	Tim Weissman	Albert Ortiz	Wil Upchurch
1992	Tim Weissman	Robert Hernandez	Owen Giraldo
1993	Tim Weissman	Owen Giraldo	Wil Upchurch
1998	Tim Weissman	José Mora	Wil Upchurch
2000	José Mora	Danny Hynes	Jimmy Heilander
2002	José Mora	Danny Hynes	Anthony Marino
2003	Anthony Marino	José Mora	Danny Hynes
2004	Danny Hynes	Ehab Shoukry	Anthony Marino
2005	Danny Hynes	Ehab Shoukry	Anthony Marino
2007	Tim Weissman	Vince Schappell	Joe Cain
2008	Danny Hynes	Jimmy Heilander	Syed Rahman

==== North Carolina State ====
Source: 2023, 2024, 2025

Year	Champion	Runner-up	Third place
2023	Vince Sauceda	Jacob Muñoz	Justin Flores
2024	Jacob Weissman	Austin Fernandes	Vince Sauceda
2025	Connor Cummings	Joey Liss	Brian Accrocco
2026	Colin Cummings	Joey Liss	Brian "Q" Quezada

==== Houston City Open ====
Source: Table Talk newsletters for each year

Year	Champion	Runner-up	Third place
1981	Phil Arnold	Robert Hernandez	
1982	Robert Hernandez	Phil Arnold	Don Metzler
1983	Robert Hernandez	Phil Arnold	
1984	Phil Arnold	Robert Hernandez	Paul Marshall
1985	Phil Arnold	Robert Hernandez	Mike Schoppe
1986	Robert Hernandez	Vince Schappell	
1988	Phil Arnold	Tim Weissman	Paul Marshall
1990	Tim Weissman	T.C. Cabot	Vince Schappell
1991	Tim Weissman	T.C. Cabot	Robert Hernandez
1992	Tim Weissman	Mark Robbins	Owen Giraldo
1996	Tim Weissman	Owen Giraldo	Wil Upchurch

==== Chicago Open ====
Source: 2025

Year	Champion	Runner-up	Third place
2025	Joey Liss	Connor Cummings	Brian "Q" Quezada

==== California Open ====
Source: Western Air-Table-Hockey News (Sep '91)

Year	Champion	Runner-up	Third place
1990	Tim Weissman	Mark Robbins	Vince Schappell
1991	Tim Weissman	Mark Robbins	Don James
1999	Wil Upchurch	Brian Accrocco	Owen Giraldo

==== Dallas-Fort Worth Open ====
Source: Western Air-Table-Hockey News (Sep '91)

Year	Champion	Runner-up	Third place
1991	Tim Weissman	Robert Hernandez	Wil Upchurch

==== East Coast Open ====
Source: Western Air-Table-Hockey News (Sep '91)

Year	Champion	Runner-up	Third place
1992	Andy Yevish	Joe Campbell	Mike Barry

==== Colorado State Championships ====
Source: Western Air-Table-Hockey News (Sep '91); '98 US Open Program

Year	Champion	Runner-up	Third place
1990	Tim Weissman	Mike Pryor	Mark Robbins
1991	Tim Weissman	Andy Yevish	Paul Marshall
1992	Tim Weissman	Owen Giraldo	Don James
1993	Tim Weissman	Mark Robbins	Don James
1994	Tim Weissman	Don James	Keith Fletcher
1997	Wil Upchurch		

==== Minnesota State Amateur Championships ====
Source: Western Air-Table-Hockey News (Sep '91)

Year	Champion	Runner-up	Third place
1990	Steve Lindsey	Sheldon Silva	Vern Lovdokken
1991	Steve Lindsey	Mark Mathias	

==== Maryland Amateur Championships ====
Source: Western Air-Table-Hockey News (Sep '91)

Year	Champion	Runner-up	Third place
1991	Tim Brown	Steve Peacock	Brian Whitt

==== Baltimore Amateur Championships ====
Source: Western Air-Table-Hockey News (Sep '91)

Year	Champion	Runner-up	Third place
1991	Alan Chinn	Lucien Florea	Barry Cantor

==== New York State Amateur Championships ====
Source: Western Air-Table-Hockey News (Sep '91)

Year	Champion	Runner-up	Third place
1991	Alan Chinn	Tim Brown	

==== New York City Amateur Championships ====
Source: Western Air-Table-Hockey News (Sep '91)

Year	Champion	Runner-up	Third place
1991	Owen Egan	Graham Zoppi	Tim Brown

==== New York/New Jersey Regional Championships ====
Source: Western Air-Table-Hockey News (Sep '91)

Year	Champion	Runner-up	Third place
1992	Michael Rosen	Jason Traynelis	Fred Mesot

==== EAHA European Championship ====
Year	Champion	Runner-up	Third place
2006 (Singles)	Goran Mitic	Michael L. Rosen	José Luis Camacho (Note: "European champion")
2007 (Singles)	José Luis Camacho	Sergey Antonov	Sergio López
2006 (Teams)	Spain	Czech Republic	
2007 (Teams)	Russia	Spain	

==== WTHA European Championship ====
Year	Champion	Runner-up	Third place
2008	Martin Kučera	Petr Honsa	Dalibor Kyzlink
2009	German Vargin	Aleš Tichavský	Tomáš Vítámvás
2010	German Vargin	Jiří Kubesa	Jan Kubečka
2011	Aleš Mařa	Jaroslav Jun. Frankl	Martin Kučera
2012	German Vargin	Martin Kučera	Jakub Gabco
2014	Patrik Juchelka	Pavel Koloděj	Jakub David
2018	Ladislav Šustáček	Jaromír Procházka	Pavel Koloděj
2022	Lukáš Doležal	Patrik Juchelka	Ladislav Šustáček

==== WTHA World Championship ====
Year	Champion	Runner-up	Third place
2016	Dmitriy Pavlov	Martin Kučera	Matěj Šanoba
2024	Karel Lang	Lukáš Doležal	Jan Doležal

==== Catalan Championship ====
Year	Champion	Runner-up	Third place
2003	Pedro Otero	Emilio Araujo	Marc García (Note: "Catalan champion")
2004	Marc García	Sergio López	José Luis Camacho
2005	José Luis Camacho	Sergio López	Marc García
2006	José Luis Camacho	Marc García	Javi Navarro
2007	Marc García	Mauro Sturlese	Javi Navarro
2008	Sergio López	José Luis Camacho	Mauro Sturlese
2009	Arnau Martín	Sergio López	Marc García
2012	Jairo Correa	Jorge Tomas	Sergio Lópe

==== WTHA Russia Open ====
Year	Champion	Runner-up	Third place
2006	Mauro Sturlese	Igor Masloboev (Note: "Russian champion")	Sergey Grishin
2007	Dmitriy Butyrev	Sergey Grishin	Nikita Vaganov
2008	Anton Kozykhodzhaev		
2009	Dmitriy Butyrev		
2010	Sergey Khomchenkov		
2012	German Vargin		
2013	German Vargin		
2014	Denis Miniyarov	Jakub Hasil	Petr Vyoral
2015	Maxim Suprunenko	Jakub Hasil	
2016	Dmitriy Pavlov		
2017	Jakub Hasil	Ruslan Pasechnik	Evgeniy Volkov
2018	Maxim Suprunenko	Ruslan Pasechnik	Petr Honsa
2019	Evgeniy Volkov	Ruslan Pasechnik	Nadezhda Pasechnik
2021	Ruslan Pasechnik	Artem Yumashev	Roman Tomashpol
2022	Ruslan Pasechnik	Nadezhda Pasechnik	Nikolai Ivanov
2023	Ruslan Pasechnik	Roman Tomashpol	Nadezhda Pasechnik
2024	Dmitriy Butyrev	Andrey Eskin	Ruslan Pasechnik
2025	Andrey Eskin	Roman Tomashpol	Ruslan Pasechnik

==== Russian National Championship ====
Year	Champion	Runner-up	Third place
2008	Dmitriy Butyrev	Vadim Chizhevskiy	German Vargin
2009	German Vargin	Sergey Antonov	Vadim Chizhevskiy
2010	Vadim Chizhevskiy	German Vargin	Sergey Rebrakov
2011	Yuri Moiseev	Anton Polskiy	Vadim Chizhevskiy
2012	Vadim Chizhevskiy	Dmitriy Pavlov	Anton Polskiy
2013	Dmitriy Pavlov	Anton Polskiy	Vadim Chizhevskiy
2014	Dmitriy Pavlov	Vadim Chizhevskiy	Anton Polskiy
2015	Dmitriy Pavlov	Vadim Chizhevskiy	Anton Polskiy
2016	Vadim Chizhevskiy	Dmitriy Pavlov	Yuri Moiseev
2017	Vadim Chizhevskiy	Dmitriy Pavlov	Roman Gorokhov
2018	Vadim Chizhevskiy	Dmitriy Pavlov	Anton Polskiy
2019	Dmitriy Pavlov	Roman Gorokhov	Anton Polskiy
2020	Dmitriy Pavlov	Anton Polskiy	Vadim Chizhevskiy
2021	Dmitriy Pavlov	Anton Polskiy	Roman Gorokhov
2025	Vadim Chizhevskiy	Roman Gorokhov	Yuri Moiseev

==== Czech Championship ====
Year	Winner
2007	Martin Kučera
2008	Martin Kučera
2009	Dalibor Kyzlink
2010	Aleš Mařa
2011	Martin Kučera
2012	Martin Kučera
2013	Aleš Mařa
2014	Ladislav Šustáček
2015	Jaromír Procházka
2016	Jaromír Procházka
2017	Jaromír Procházka
2018	Simon Kaňa
2019	Jaromír Procházka
2020	Jakub Schlosser
2021	Lukáš Doležal
2022	Petr Jun. Kusý
2023	Lukáš Doležal
2024	Ladislav Šustáček
2025	Ladislav Šustáček

==== Cup of Czechia ====
Year	Winner
2007	Martin Kučera
2008	Martin Kučera
2009	Aleš Tichavský
2010	Martin Kučera
2011	Aleš Mařa
2012	Martin Kučera
2013	Jaromír Procházka
2014	Ladislav Šustáček
2015	Jaromír Procházka
2016	Ladislav Šustáček
2017	Jaromír Procházka
2018	Ladislav Šustáček
2019	Ladislav Šustáček
2020	Jakub Schlosser
2021	Lukáš Doležal
2022	Ladislav Šustáček
2023	Ladislav Šustáček
2024	Ladislav Šustáček
2025	Eryk Pawlica

==== Czech Air Hockey Cup ====
Year	Champion	Runner-up	Third place
2007	Pavel Richtr	Ondrej Cerný	Jakub Novotný

== See also ==
- Table football
- International Table Hockey Federation
- Pong
- Table hockey
- ITHF table hockey
- Novuss
- Park golf
- Carrom
- Crokinole
- Pichenotte
- Pitchnut
- Chapayev (game)
- Golf Billiards
