= Coleman Army Airfield =

American military airfield in West Germany

Coleman Barracks/Coleman Army Airfield Mannheim/Sandhofen Airfield (Y-79)
- Baden-Württemberg, Germany Coleman Army Airfield (Germany)

Site information
- Type: Military airfield on foreign soil

Location
- Coordinates: 49°33′47″N 008°27′46″E

Site history
- Built: 1925
- In use: 1937–1945 (Luftwaffe); Apr–July 1945 (USAAF); 1945–2013 (United States Army)

Coleman Barracks/Coleman Army Airfield (ICAO: ETOR) is a United States Army military installation located in the Sandhofen district of Mannheim, Germany. It is assigned to U.S. Army, Europe (USAREUR) and administered by the U.S. Army Installation Management Command-Europe (IMCOM-E). Coleman Barracks should not be confused with the former "Coleman Kaserne", located in Gelnhausen. The U.S. Army named the airfield after Lieutenant Colonel Wilson D. Coleman, who was killed in action in France on 30 July 1944.

== History ==
The first commercial airport in Mannheim was founded on 16 May 1925, as Flughafen Mannheim-Heidelberg-Ludwigshafen in the northern district of Sandhofen. With its opening Mannheim became part of an important air track, running from north to south and vice versa. In the late 1920s and early 1930s Deutsche Aero Lloyd operated cargo and passenger flights from Hamburg to Zürich stopping in Mannheim. Balair from Switzerland flew between Geneva and Amsterdam via Basel, Mannheim, Frankfurt, and Essen. Badisch-Pfälzische Luftverkehrs AG operated the Black Forest route to Konstanz, via Karlsruhe, Baden-Baden and Villingen.

In 1926 the airfield was transferred to Mannheim-Neuostheim, now called Mannheim City Airport. The airfield in Sandhofen was closed to the public and rebuilt as the Fliegerhorst-Kaserne in 1937 as a Luftwaffe base. At the beginning of World War II, the III/JG 53 (3rd Group, Jagdgeschwader 53) fighter unit "Pik-As" (Ace of Spades) was based here, commanded by one of Germany's top combat pilots, Werner Mölders. This unit operated 43 new Messerschmitt Bf 109E-1 fighter aircraft at the start of the war. Also stationed at the airbase on the first day of the war was one Staffel (squadron) of JG 72 operating 16 of the older Arado Ar 68 biplane fighters then being used as a primitive night fighter. In September 1944 a prisoner of war camp was installed on the site which was operated and guarded by the SS, holding 80 POWs from Poland, Luxembourg and Russia.

After World War II, the United States Army took over the barracks in the fall of 1945, giving it the temporary name of "Y-79". Until mid-1949 the area was used as a collecting point for unserviceable automobile material and for surplus storage. In 1951, a replacement depot was established at Coleman Barracks and served as the staging area for all troops arriving in Germany. Throughout its operation by the U.S. Army, rumors circulated of an extensive set of tunnels beneath the airfield. Some of the rumors concerned tunnels under the base and a number of underground hangars behind the barracks of the Signal Corps units. The tunnels and other underground facilities were supposedly flooded after the war. There were reports of an alley that ran behind a cluster of barracks located next to a pronounced slope where numerous bunker entrances were located, all of which were rumored to be locked. Despite any hard evidence, these rumors persisted over the years and stories of hidden Nazi bunkers and tunnels were passed on from one generation of soldiers stationed at Coleman to the next.

== Location ==
The airport is located 8.5 km (5.28 mi) north of the Mannheim city center in the district of Sandhofen, 2.5 km (1.6 mi) east of the river Rhine and 3 km (1.86 mi) south of Lampertheim.

It is surrounded by Autobahn 6 (A6) to the south and a state highway (Bundesstraße 44 (B44)) to the west; the Mannheim–Frankfurt railway train line (between Frankfurt and Mannheim) runs 1.6 km (1 mi) to the east.

== Runways ==
The airport has one paved runway (900 m (2954 ft) x 20 m (67 ft)). The runway offered Precision Approach Path Indicator and illumination. Discussions were held about extending the runway to 1200 metres, but those plans were withdrawn due to severe protests by nearby residents. The airfield was in use from 06:30 – 23:59 daily. Radar approach had been available since June 2002.

Coleman was the only U.S. Army airfield in Germany that had its own approach control zone and provided approach control for several airports in the vicinity, both military and civilian, such as Mannheim City Airport (civilian), Speyer airfield (civilian), Worms airfield (civilian), and Heidelberg Army Airfield (military).

== Buildings ==
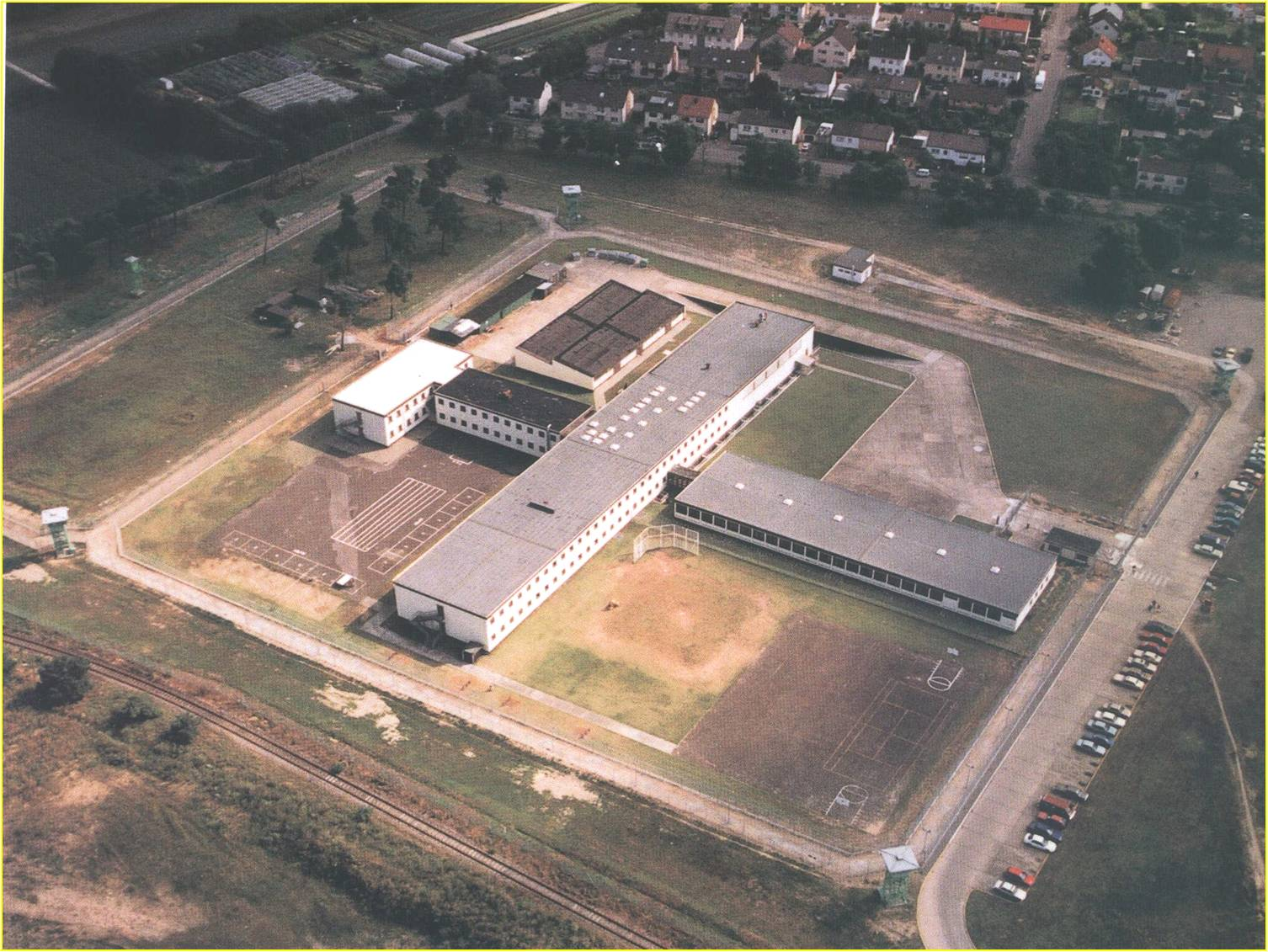
US Army Correctional Facility-Europe

A new state of the art six-story control tower was built in 2004. Besides air-conditioned offices, briefing rooms, restrooms and an elevator, the tower accommodated the Coleman radar approach control room. The facility also hosted a US Army helicopter maintenance facility and the only US Army military prison in Europe, the United States Army Corrections Facility – Europe, which relocated to Sembach as of December 2014.

== Air traffic ==
When it was the only maintenance base for Sikorsky UH-60 Black Hawk and Boeing AH-64 Apache helicopters in Europe, Coleman Airfield had more take-offs and landings than any other US Army airfield in Germany. The Coleman Aero Club (CAC) was the only U.S. military non-profit flying organization in Europe. The CAC provided flight training to member forces of NATO, the United States Armed Forces, and civilians. It operated a fleet of several US-registered Cessna aircraft. Since the airfield at Coleman Barracks has ceased operations, the club has relocated to Worms Airport between Bobenheim-Roxheim and Worms. On March 6, 2026, they moved from Worms Airport (EDFV) to Mannheim Airport (EDFM).

== Tenant activities ==
In 2004, the American Forces Network (AFN)- Europe consolidated its headquarters and Radio/TV studios from Frankfurt and Heidelberg to Coleman Barracks. Coleman Barracks also had a small post exchange (PX) and bowling alley.

== Cancelled closure ==
External videos
- Coleman Barracks, Mannheim Germany Drive through

As part of the ongoing realignment of US forces in Europe, the Army shut down most operations in Mannheim in 2012. Earlier plans (as of September 2012) called for closure of all USAREUR facilities in Mannheim and Heidelberg by 31 August 2013. In February 2015, USAREUR announced Coleman Barracks will be retained temporarily as an interim site to store and maintain pre-positioned vehicles and equipment that will be used to support U.S. Army Regionally Aligned Forces when they rotate into theater for training, exercises or contingency operations. Upon final closure the facility will be returned to the German government.

In August 2021, the US Army announced that the presence in Mannheim was to be kept as part of an effort to deploy an additional 500 troops to Europe.

== See also ==
- Advanced Landing Ground
