= Mannheim Rangierbahnhof =

Germany's second-largest marshalling yard

Mannheim Marshalling Yard Mannheim Rangierbahnhof
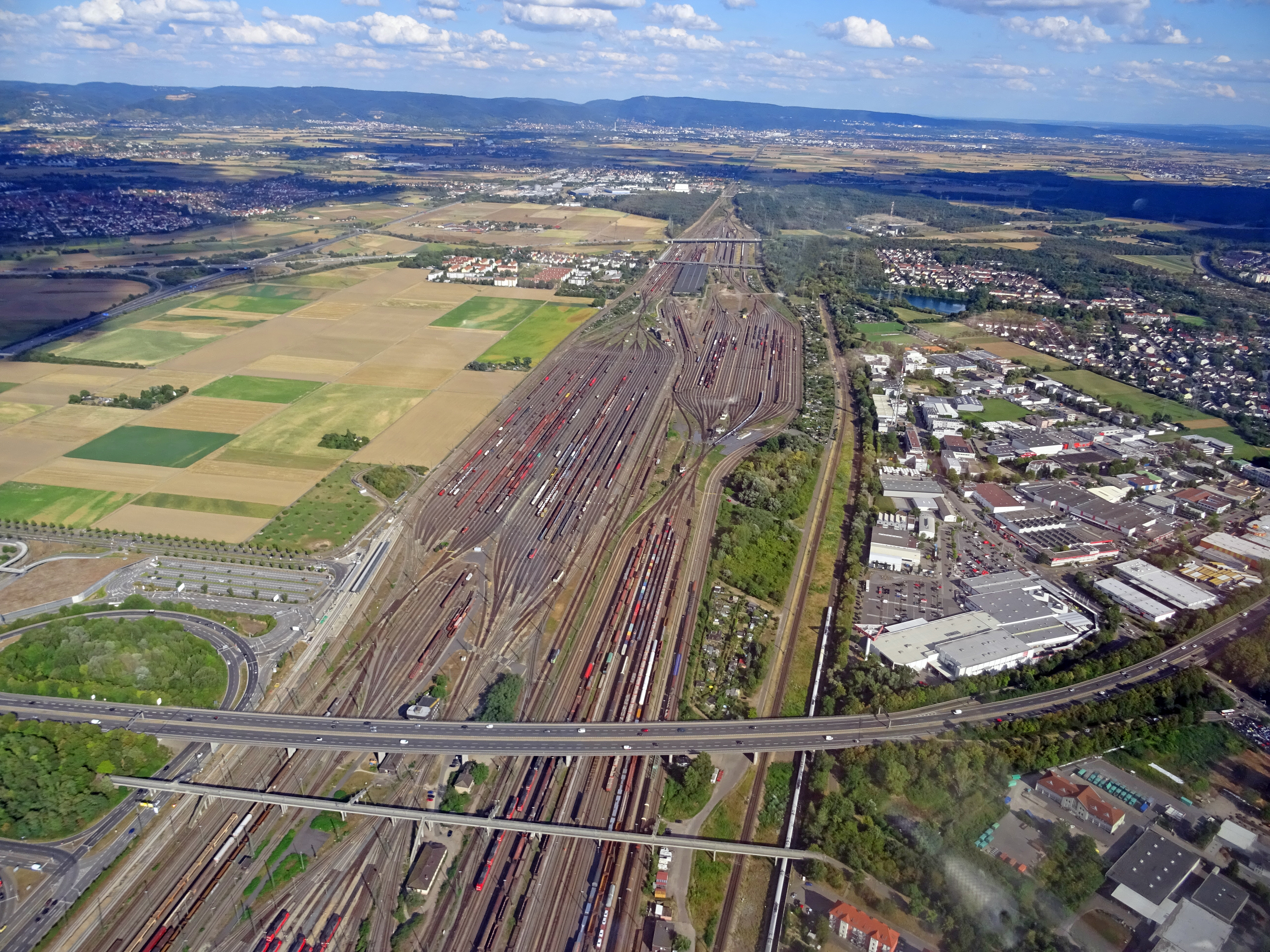
- Aerial view

General information
- Location: Mannheim, Baden-Württemberg; Germany
- Coordinates: 49°27′21″N 8°31′18″E
- System: Railway classification (hump yard) and repair facilities

Construction
- Structure type: at-grade

Other information
- Station code: RMR
Location
- Location within Baden-Württemberg Location within Germany

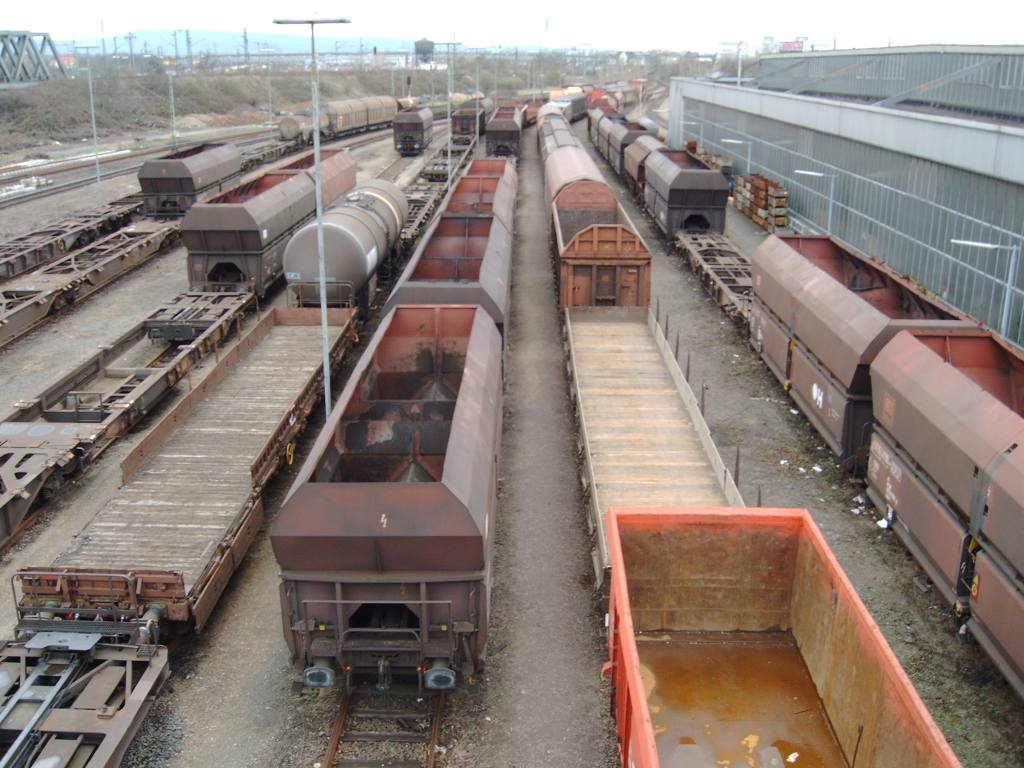
Lined-up wagons

The Mannheim Rangierbahnhof (German for Mannheim marshalling yard) is a marshalling yard in Mannheim, Baden-Württemberg, Germany. It is the second-largest marshalling yard in Germany after the Maschen Marshalling Yard.

== Geography ==
The station stretches along the Mannheim-Basel railroad line on an area of over 200 hectares between the Mannheim districts of Neckarau in the southwest, Neuhermsheim in the northwest, Pfingstberg in the southeast and Hochstätt in the northeast. Over its length of more than 6 kilometers and width of 400 meters on average, it is crossed in a north-south direction by the Bundesautobahn 6 and the Bundesstraße 38a.

== History ==
In the 19th century, Mannheim was a transhipment point for goods due to its important harbour and as an important industrial location. This also required the construction of a marshalling yard. Thus, the city's first pure marshalling yard was built in the Lindenhof district in 1863. Its capacity was no longer sufficient for the growing city and the port at the turn of the century, and a new building became necessary. Thus, in 1906, a new two-sided marshalling yard was completed at its present location as a joint station of the Baden and Prussian-Hessian railroads (cost: 18 million marks). During World War II, the station was temporarily expanded, but was severely damaged at the end of the war. After its repair, it was expanded in the 1960s and 1970s, and its basic layout has remained largely unchanged since then. However, the shunting technology was modernized at the beginning of the 21st century.

In 2021, a tank car loaded with 65 tons of methyl chloride was recovered, after it overturned in the Mannheim marshalling yard.
