= Mannheim City Airport =

Minor regional airport in Mannheim, Baden-Württemberg, Germany

Mannheim City Airport City-Airport Mannheim
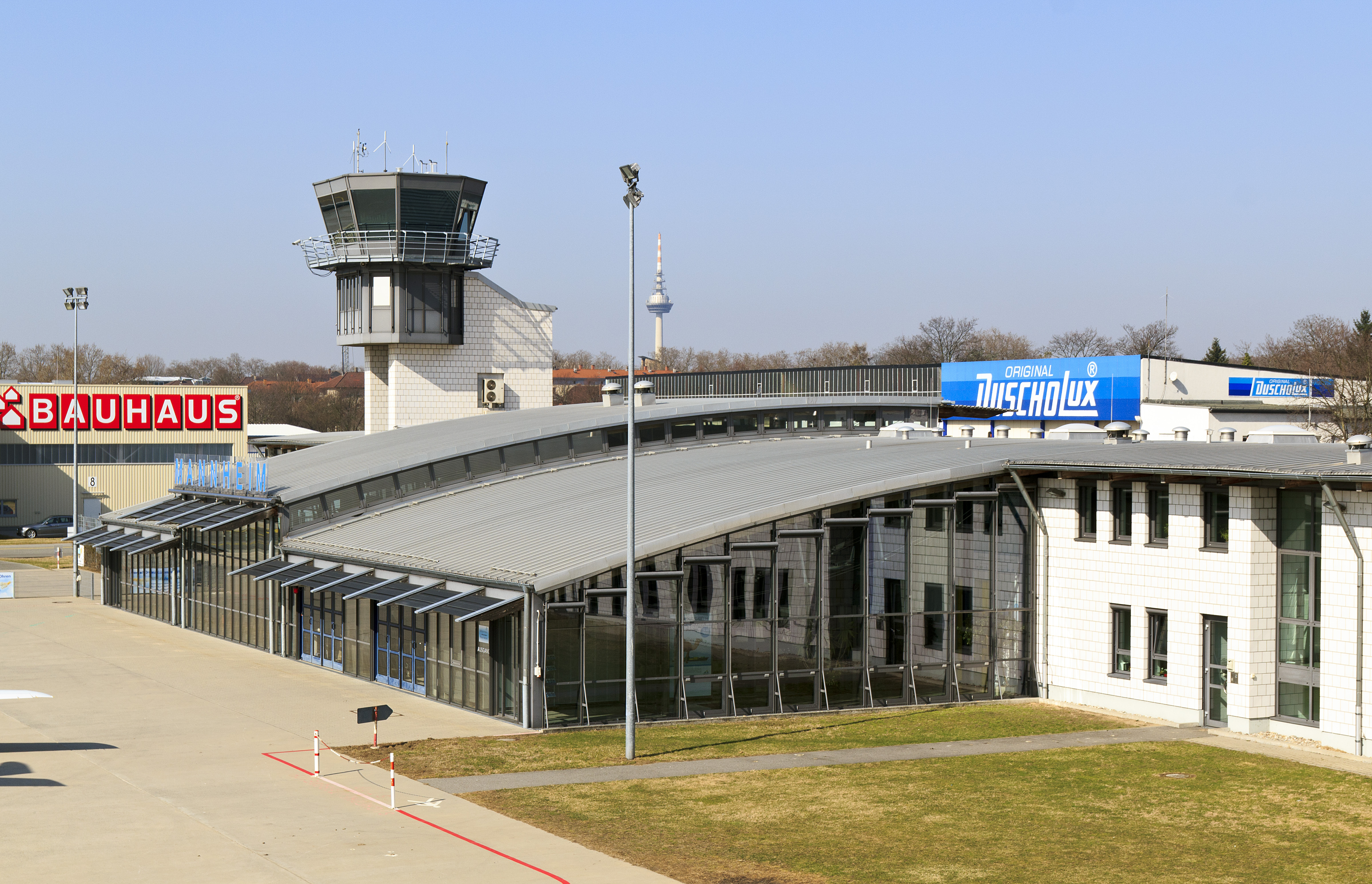
- IATA: MHG; ICAO: EDFM

Summary
- Operator: Rhein-Neckar Flugplatz GmbH
- Serves: Mannheim, Baden-Württemberg, Germany
- Elevation AMSL: 309 ft (94 m)
- Coordinates: 49°28′21″N 08°30′51″E
- Website: flugplatz-mannheim.de

Map
- Location within Baden-Württemberg

Runways
| Direction | Length | | Surface |
| Direction | ft | m | Surface |
|---|---|---|---|
| 09/27 | 3,497 | 1,066 | Asphalt |
| 09/27 | 2,297 | 700 | Grass |
- AIP at German air traffic control.

Mannheim City Airport (IATA: MHG, ICAO: EDFM) (City-Airport Mannheim in German, formerly Mannheim-Neuostheim/Neuhermsheim) is a minor regional airport serving the German city of Mannheim. It is mainly used for general aviation.

== Location ==
The airport is located 3.5 km (2.2 mi) east of the city center in the district of Neuostheim. It is surrounded by highways to the east (B38a) and the south (B37/A656), there is a power transmission line to the east and several high rise buildings to the west making Mannheim City a challenging airport. Because of its proximity to the city center and the lack of space for an expansion, there have been continuous discussions about relocating the airport. The airport has its own control zone, neighboring control zones are Heidelberg Airfield and Coleman.

== History ==
=== Early years ===
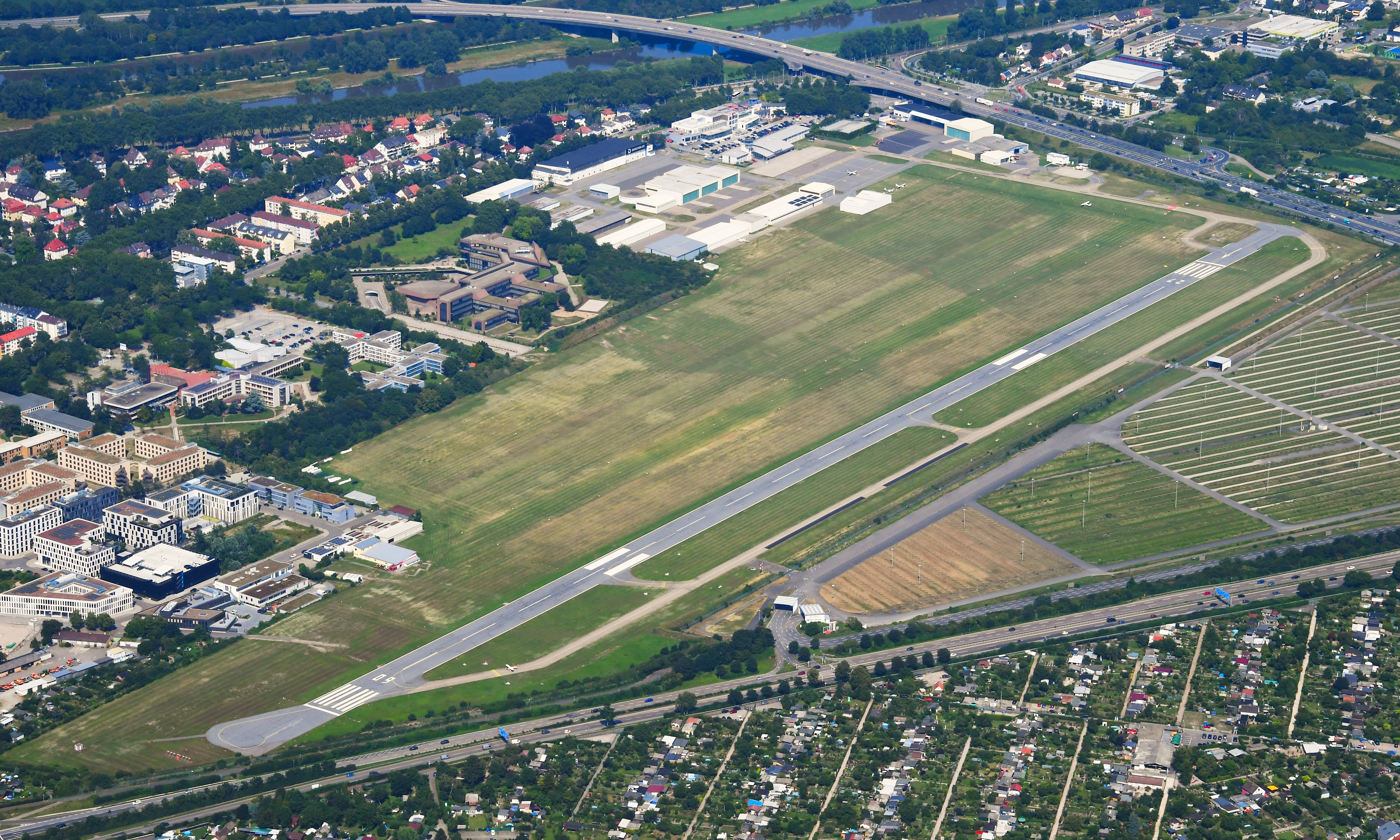
Aerial view of Mannheim City Airport

Aviation in Mannheim started with the airship constructors Schütte-Lanz in 1909. Their first airship, called SL 1, lifted off from Mannheim-Rheinau in 1911. With the growing importance of airships for military purposes, a new airfield with hangars and barracks was opened in the north of Mannheim, where the Schönau district is located today. By the end of World War I, 22 airships had been built in Mannheim. In 1922 all hangars had to be demolished, complying with the conditions imposed by the Treaty of Versailles.

The first commercial airport in Mannheim was founded on May 16, 1925, as Flughafen Mannheim-Heidelberg-Ludwigshafen in the northern district of Sandhofen. With its opening Mannheim became part of an important air track, running from north to south and vice versa. In the late 1920s and early 1930s Deutsche Aero Lloyd operated cargo and passenger flights from Hamburg to Zürich stopping in Mannheim. Balair from Switzerland flew between Geneva and Amsterdam via Basel, Mannheim, Frankfurt and Essen. Badisch-Pfälzische Luftverkehrs A.G operated the Black Forest route to Konstanz, via Karlsruhe, Baden Baden and Villingen.

In 1926 the airfield was transferred to Mannheim-Neuostheim, its present site. The same year Deutsche Luft Hansa was founded in Berlin. A Luft Hansa route map of the 1930s shows scheduled flights from Mannheim to Frankfurt via Darmstadt and other destinations, like Stuttgart, Saarbrücken and Konstanz. In 1939 Luft Hansa flew nonstop to the capital Berlin using various Junkers aircraft.

During World War II the airport was severely damaged. After the war the airport was occupied by the US-Army and temporarily used as a transmitter site. The terminal building and hangars were partly demolished and partly refurbished. The airfield was reopened to the public in 1958, but with the growing size of postwar aircraft, Mannheim-Neuostheim was no longer served by any major airline and mainly used for private flying.

=== Development since the 1980s ===
A Dornier 328 approaching Runway 09

In 1983, a test flight for STOL (short take-off and landing) aircraft took place with a four-engined Dash-7 turboprop aircraft.

In 1986, DRF (Deutsche Rettungsflugwacht, e. V.) installed a helicopter air rescue center at MHG. Scheduled passenger flights did not start again until the 1980s when Arcus-Air Logistic operated flights between Mannheim and Oberpfaffenhofen near Munich, using Dornier 228 aircraft. These flights were offered up to three times daily, depending on demand. Besides cargo flights the airline added three weekly passenger flights to Leipzig and Dresden in 1991. In 1997 Cosmos Air (Arcus-Air Logistic) was founded in Mannheim and started nonstop flights to Berlin Tempelhof Airport and London City Airport using the larger Dornier 328 turboprop. Due to lack of demand, the London route was suspended one year later.

Until that time, a provisional container building had been used as the terminal, but new facilities opened in 1998. In 1999 Cosmos Air was taken over by Cirrus Airlines, continuing the flights to Berlin-Tempelhof and opening new routes to Hamburg and Saarbrücken. With the entry of Cirrus Airlines into Team Lufthansa in 2000, Lufthansa came back to Mannheim after 60 years of absence, and Mannheim reappeared in the official Lufthansa itinerary.

In 2002 Mannheim-Neuostheim was officially renamed Mannheim City Airport.

In October 2008 Cirrus Airlines started new direct flights from Mannheim to Munich, connecting the city to one of the Lufthansa main hubs. However, this service consisted for only four months. In August 2010, the Mannheim-Hamburg service celebrated its 10th anniversary, but due to hard competition coming from Frankfurt Airport on this route, Cirrus Airlines had to discontinue it on November 26, 2010. On December 22, 2011, Cirrus Airlines decided to also end the last scheduled route to Berlin-Tegel, shortly before filing bankruptcy.

Cirrus Technik also operated a maintenance facility for Dornier 328 turboprop aircraft, which moved to Saarbrücken at the end of 2009.

=== Today ===
Due to its problematic geographical location, an extension of the airport has become impossible, preventing modern regional jets, such as the Canadair Regional Jet or the Embraer 145, from operating from MHG. With the introduction of the new JAR-OPS 2 regulation, strict weight restrictions have been imposed, allowing only smaller and lighter airplanes to land at MHG. From 2014 on, even tighter restrictions from EASA will become effective in Europe, which will probably bring a further impact on commercial air traffic. After a first accident involving a scheduled passenger flight on March 19, 2008, and the growing lack of airlines with the adequate equipment to fly into MHG, discussions about a relocation of the airport have regained political importance. With its coming closure in 2015, Coleman Airfield is seen as a possible, but challenging alternative, as well as the airport of Speyer, where BASF has its corporate jets based. There are ongoing controversial discussions about shutting down the airport in the future and proposals are being considered, such as using the site for the 2023 Bundesgartenschau.

== Infrastructure ==
Check-in area

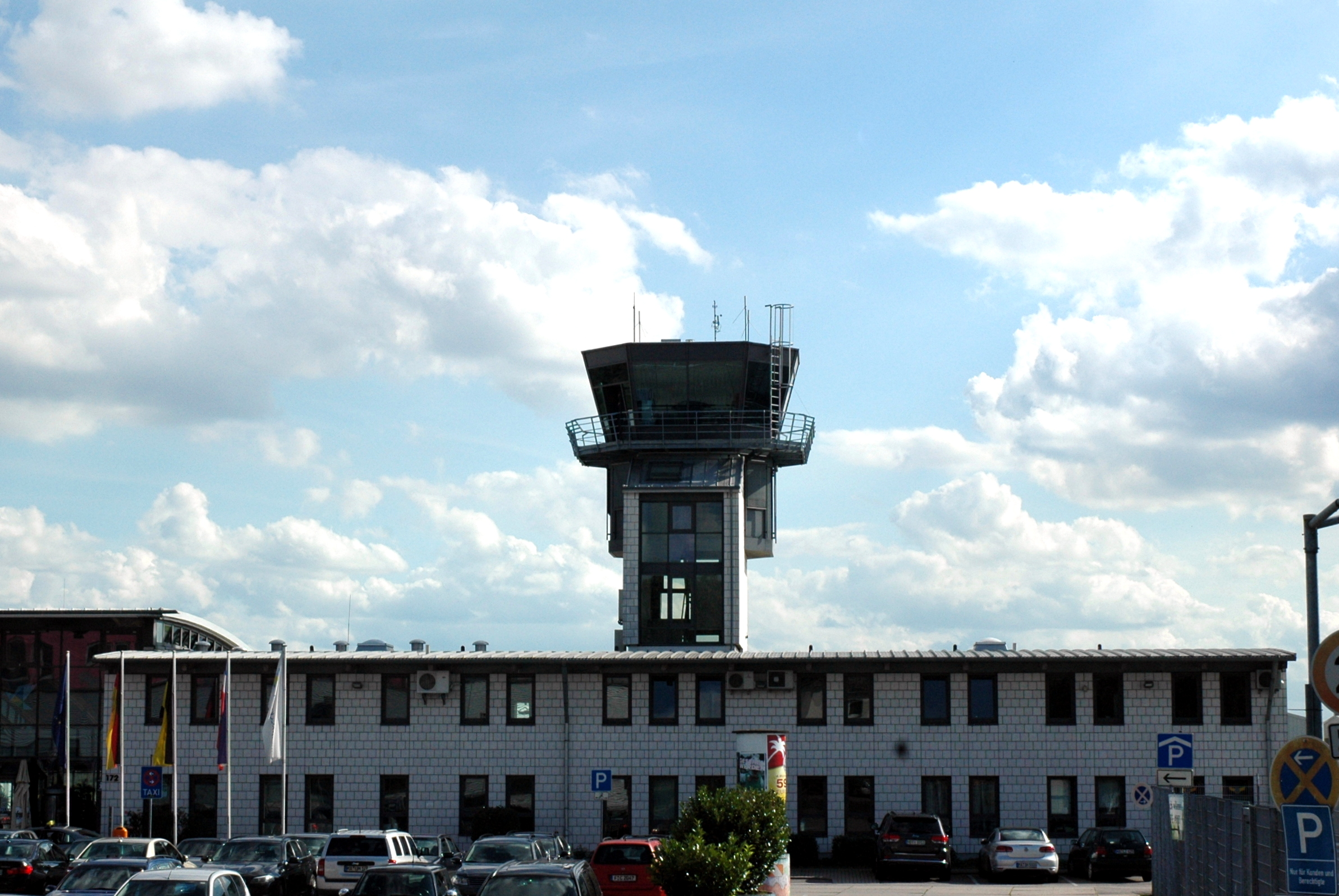
Control tower

=== Facilities ===
The sand-lime brick designed terminal building, built by architect Prof. Peter Serini, opened in 1998. In its arched central section it offers two check-in counters, a security passenger checkpoint, a waiting area, a baggage claim area, a ticketing office and an electronic flight schedule. In addition it accommodates a snack-bar, airline offices, a police station and a flying school. The terminal is topped by a new control tower. Jet A-1 and Avgas 100LL are the available fuels, ground power is also available. The airport has its own fire brigade, equipped with a fire engine (FLF Impact 6000) suited to the present operations.

Close to the current terminal, there are parts of the former terminal building, including the old tower, now used as a popular restaurant and biergarten. Beside the old terminal a fitness club opened its doors in 2000. A pilot shop can be found next to the parking deck.

=== Runways ===
The airport possesses two runways: one paved main runway (09/27) and a parallel grass runway (for gliding and ballooning only). The airport is in operation at day and night. The paved runway 09/27 offers PAPI and illumination in both directions, RWY 27 offers LLZ/DME approach, but no ILS, RWY 09 is usable under visual flight rules only. A separate, illuminated and signposted taxiway is available. Aircraft up to 10,000 kg (22,046 lb) are allowed to land at the airport. The original runway length was even shorter (730m) until it was extended for safety in the 1980s.

== Airlines and destinations ==
The following airline offers scheduled services from Mannheim:

| Airlines | Destinations |
|---|---|
| Mannheim City Air | Seasonal: Sylt |

Frankfurt Airport can be reached by ICE train in just 30 minutes; alternates such as Hahn, Stuttgart, Strasbourg, Karlsruhe/Baden-Baden and Saarbrücken are also easily accessible, with most generally not much more than a 1hr 30min drive by car or train ride which explains the lack of a wider variety of flights.

=== Other tenants ===
The airport is mainly used for general aviation. Several companies, such as SAP SE, Roche Diagnostics, Heidelberger Druckmaschinen or Bilfinger SE base their corporate jets at MHG, which cover routes mainly within Europe. Business jet charter operators serving Mannheim regularly are EAS Executive AirService, ATB Flugdienst and Business Wings. The aerodrome also serves as an important heliport for medevac or VIP transports. DRF (Deutsche Rettungsflugwacht, e. V.) is present with a 24h/365days medevac helicopter. A flying school (LGM) and two Aero Clubs (Badisch Pfälzischer Flugsportverein and Segelflugverein Mannheim) are established at Mannheim. There is also seasonal glider activity.

== Ground transportation ==
A carpark is available for passengers arriving at the airport via federal road B38a, the Rhine-Neckar Expressway. Tram lines 5 and 6 as well as bus line 50 connect the airport with the city center within 10 minutes.

== Accidents and incidents ==
- 12 November 1937: ten people were killed and two passengers survived seriously injured in a Deutsche Lufthansa Heinkel He 111 (registered D-AXAV) crash, the cause of which remained unknown.
- 7 June 1940: A Luftwaffe Junkers Ju 52 crashed at take-off, killing one crew member.
- 11 September 1982: a Chinook CH-47C helicopter of the U.S. Army crashes onto highway A656 during an airshow, killing 46 people.
- 19 March 2008: Cirrus flight 1567 from Berlin-Tempelhof overshot runway 27 and came to rest on a wall close to a highway. 5 of the 27 people on board were slightly hurt, and the aircraft, a Dornier 328 (D-CTOB), was severely damaged.

== See also ==
- List of airports in Germany
- Transport in Germany
