= Chapman Freeborn Group =

- Type: Private
- Industry: Aviation
- Founded: 1973
- Founders: Chris Chapman; Mike Freeborn
- Headquarters: Gatwick, West Sussex, United Kingdom
- Products: Aircraft charter brokerage Air cargo Business aviation ACMI leasing On-board courier Animal transportation
- Number of employees: 400+
- Parent: Avia Solutions Group
- Subsidiaries: Chapman Freeborn Airchartering; Magma Aviation; Intradco Global; Arcus Air Logistic; Arcus OBC; Chapman Freeborn OBC; Arcus Air Group
- Website: chapmanfreeborn.aero

Chapman Freeborn Group (also referred to as CFG) is a British aviation services holding company headquartered in Gatwick, United Kingdom, specialising in aircraft charter brokerage for cargo, commercial passenger, ACMI and business aviation clients worldwide. The group was founded in London in 1973 by Chris Chapman and Mike Freeborn. It operates as an independent broker, sourcing aircraft from a network of operators rather than holding an air operator certificate or owning commercial aircraft itself.

In October 2019, Chapman Freeborn was acquired by Avia Solutions Group, a global aviation holding company headquartered in Ireland. Following the acquisition, the group retained its existing brands and operating structure. In October 2025, Saska Gerasimova was appointed Group CEO, succeeding Eric Erbacher, who moved to the role of Group Chairman.

== History ==
=== Foundation (1973) ===
In 1973, Chris Chapman and Mike Freeborn established Chapman Freeborn in London. The company developed as a specialist broker for cargo aircraft charter services. Mike Freeborn stepped back from an active role in 1978.

=== European expansion (1982–2000) ===
In 1982, Chapman Freeborn opened an office in Frankfurt, Germany. During the 1980s and 1990s, the company expanded its international office network, including operations in Europe, North America, Asia, and the Middle East.

=== Acquisitions and diversification (2001–2018) ===
In 2006, Chapman Freeborn launched its specialist on-board courier (OBC) service, headquartered in Cologne, Germany.

In 2010, Chapman Freeborn backed the creation of Magma Aviation, a dedicated cargo aircraft management company. In May 2017, Chapman Freeborn increased its shareholding in Magma Aviation to a majority stake of 75%.

In February 2014, Chapman Freeborn completed the acquisition of a majority shareholding in Intradco Cargo Services (now Intradco Global), a UK-based specialist in animal air transportation established in 1987. In November 2021, Intradco Global, in collaboration with Chapman Freeborn's South Africa team, arranged a charter flight to transport 18 giraffes from South Africa to Brazil aboard a Boeing 747F.

In 2015, Etihad Airways and Chapman Freeborn announced a collaboration to market Etihad's A380 premium cabin products to charter clients.

=== Acquisition by Avia Solutions Group (2019) ===
On 14 June 2019, Avia Solutions Group signed an agreement to acquire 100% of the shareholding in Chapman Freeborn Group.

The acquisition was completed on 15 October 2019, following receipt of regulatory approvals. Chapman Freeborn retained its existing brands and continued to operate its established subsidiaries.

=== Post-acquisition developments (2020–present) ===
On 18 June 2020, Chapman Freeborn signed an agreement to acquire Arcus Air Logistic and Arcus OBC from the Arcus Air Group. Following that acquisition, Russi Batliwala was appointed Chairman and Eric Erbacher returned to the company as Group CEO.

In 2020, Chapman Freeborn executed repatriation charter programmes during the COVID-19 pandemic.

In October 2023, Chapman Freeborn arranged the transport of six Bell helicopter fuselages from Greece to Australia aboard a Boeing 747-800F freighter. In the same year, the company marked its 50th anniversary.

In early 2025, Chapman Freeborn launched a French operations base as part of its European expansion strategy. In October 2025, Saska Gerasimova was appointed Group CEO of Chapman Freeborn.

== Business model ==
Chapman Freeborn operates as an independent air charter broker. It does not hold an air operator certificate and does not own or operate commercial aircraft; instead, it sources aircraft from airlines and operators according to client requirements.

The group's activities span business aviation, commercial passenger charter, air cargo charter, flight support services, and ACMI leasing. Specialist subsidiaries extend the group's portfolio into air cargo aircraft management, live animal transportation, on-board courier, and emergency logistics.

== Industry memberships ==
Chapman Freeborn has been a member of the Air Charter Association (ACA) since 1985. It has been a member of The International Air Cargo Association (TIACA) since 2006. The company is an associate member of the National Business Aviation Association (NBAA).
