= Dan Hynes =

Dan Hynes may refer to:

- Daniel Hynes, American politician, formerly the Illinois comptroller
- Dan Hynes (New Hampshire politician), member of the New Hampshire House of Representatives
- Danny Hynes, air hockey player
