= Neckarau =

- Borough of Mannheim
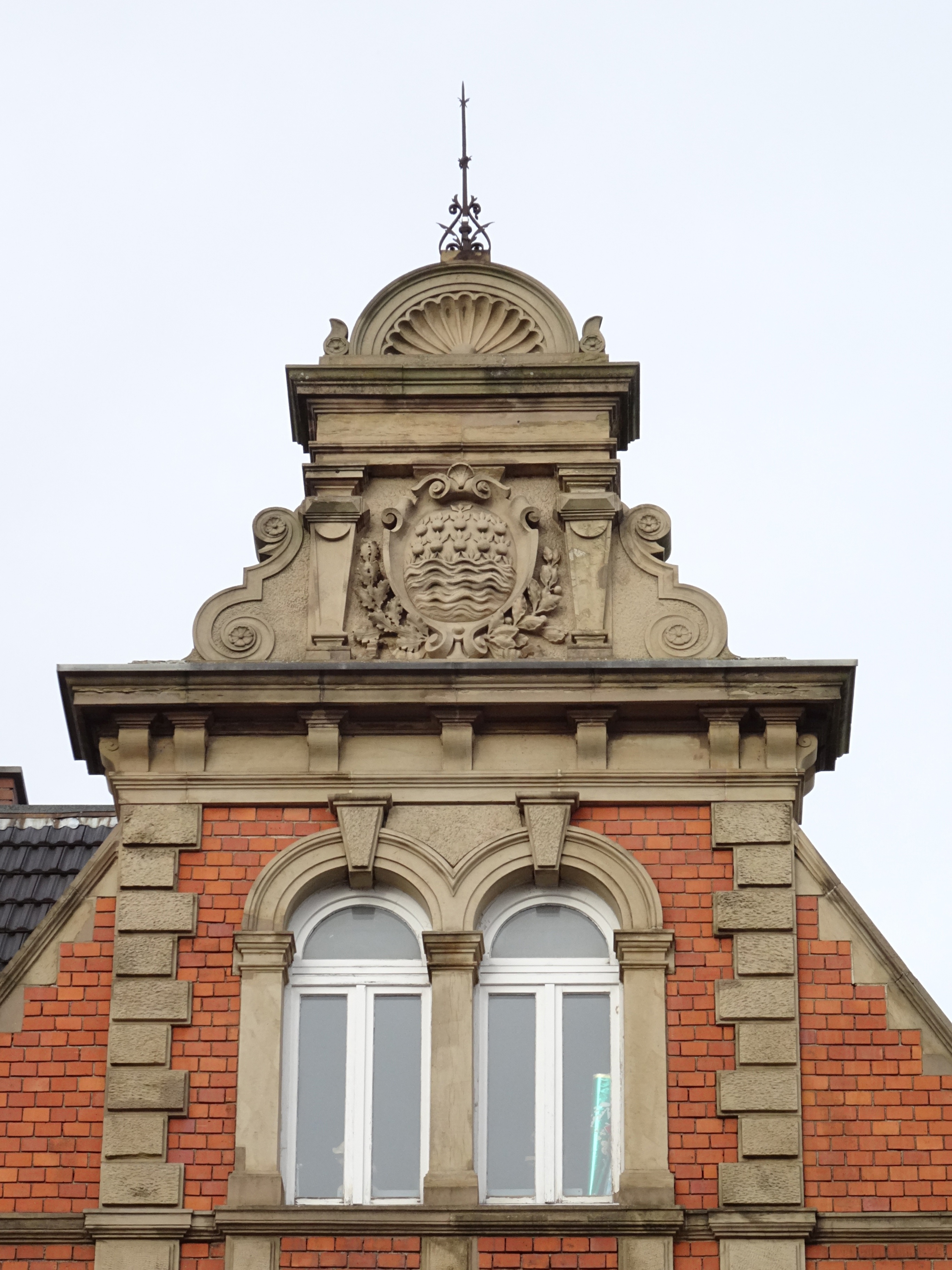
- Gable of Neckarau town hall with the coat of arms
- Interactive map of Neckarau
- Location within Germany Location within Baden-Württemberg
- Coordinates: 49°27′N 8°29′E
- Country: Germany
- State: Baden-Württemberg
- City: Mannheim

Area
  - Total: 11.10 km^{2} (4.29 sq mi)

Population (2024-12-31)
  - Total: 30,599
  - Density: 2,757/km^{2} (7,140/sq mi)
- Time zone: UTC+01:00 (CET)
  - Summer (DST): UTC+02:00 (CEST)

Neckarau (Mannheim dialect: Neggara nɛga.rɑː) is a borough of Mannheim in the Rhine-Neckar metropolitan region. The term also refers to the city district in which the borough is located.

== Geography ==
=== District ===
The Neckarau district is located in the southwest of Mannheim directly on the Rhine. It includes the borough of Neckarau as well as Almenhof and Niederfeld. Neighboring districts are Lindenhof, Neuhermsheim and Rheinau. On the opposite side of the Rhine lie the Rhineland-Palatinate municipalities of Ludwigshafen and Altrip.

=== Borough ===
The borough of Neckarau is bordered in the northwest by Rheingoldstraße, separating it from Niederfeld, and by Rottfeldstraße and Voltastraße from Almenhof. In the northeast, the boundary with Neuhermsheim runs approximately through the middle of the marshalling yard. To the east, Neckarau borders the Mallau area along the B 38a, to the southeast the Casterfeld area of Rheinau, and to the south the municipality of Altrip across the Rhine. To the west, Neckarau ends in the Waldpark just before the beach area belonging to Niederfeld.

Neckarau is divided into four statistical areas: Neckarau-Northeast, Neckarau-Southeast, Neckarau-South, and Neckarau-Center.

== Etymology ==
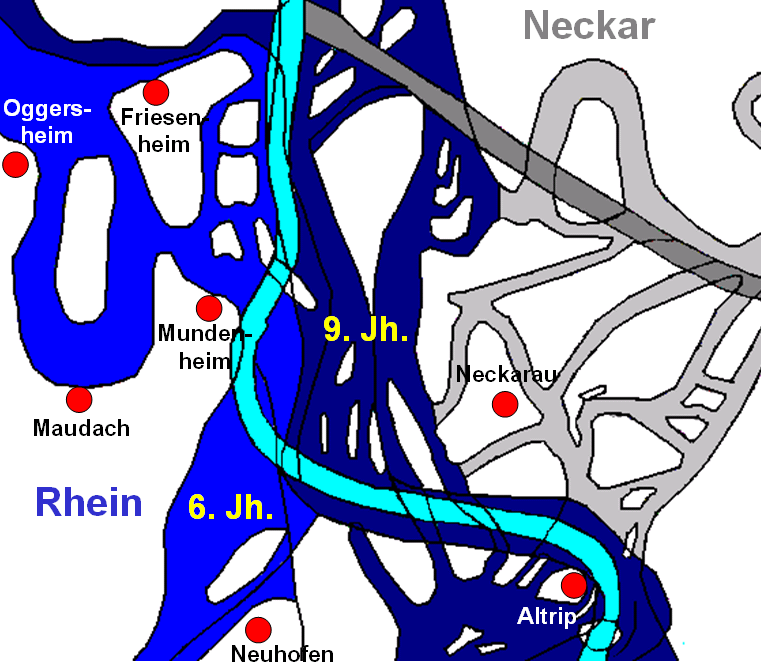
Historic river mouths

Although Neckarau lies closer to the Rhine than to the Neckar, the latter gave the district its name. During the time of the Carolingians, the Neckar flowed into the Rhine at this location. Neckarau was situated on an island within the river delta. Due to this location, it was frequently at risk of flooding. At the end of the 13th century, the Neckar shifted its main course north of present-day Mannheim.

== History ==
In 368, a burgus of the fort of Alta Ripa (Altrip) was located in what is now Neckarau. Neckarau was first mentioned in 871 as “Naucrauia”. In 1212, Emperor Frederick II granted Neckarau to the Bishopric of Worms. After disputes, the settlement passed to the Electoral Palatinate in 1284.

Around 1278, the Neckar changed its course and has since flowed into the Rhine north of Mannheim. As a result, the nearby village of Hermsheim was abandoned and its inhabitants moved to Neckarau.

In the 15th century, Neckarau became an important trading location due to its position on the Rhine. In 1496 it became part of the Heidelberg administrative district. In 1577 there were 101 households. In 1689, during the Nine Years' War, Neckarau was destroyed. By 1817, the population had grown to 1,253.

In the second half of the 19th century, industrialization accelerated due to the nearby Mannheim–Karlsruhe railway. In 1899, Neckarau, then the largest village in Baden, was incorporated into Mannheim.

== Politics and administration ==
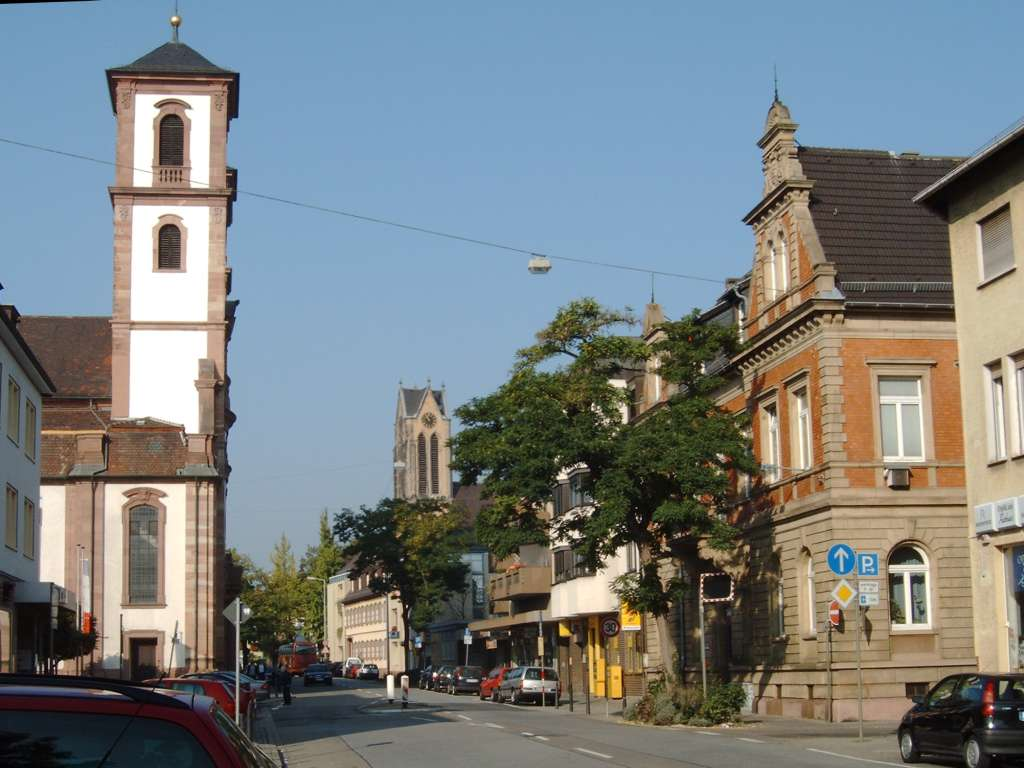
Rheingoldstraße with churches and town hall

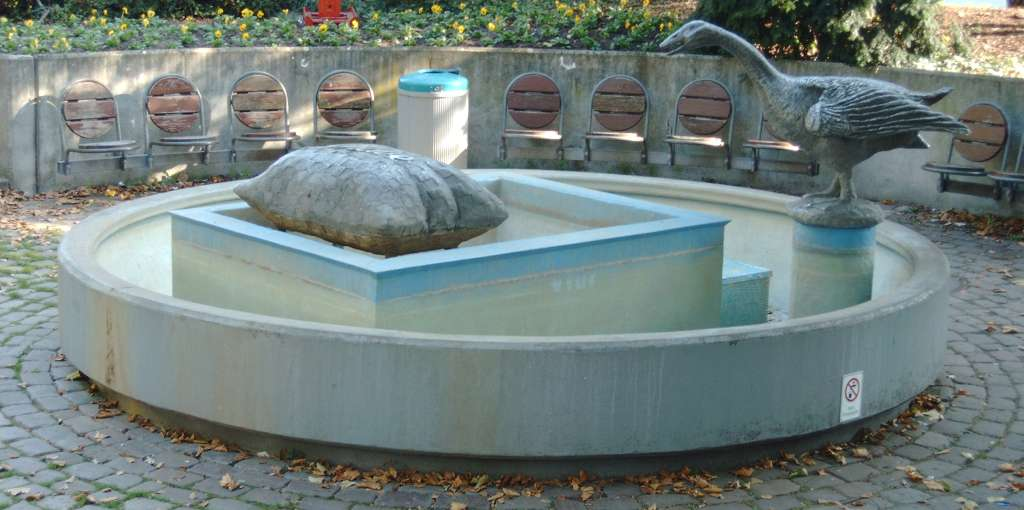
Pilwe Fountain

According to the municipal statutes, the district has an advisory council of 14 members appointed by the city council.

Neckarau also has a local administrative office responsible for municipal tasks.

=== Coat of arms ===
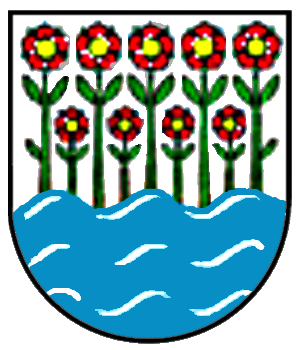
Coat of arms

The coat of arms developed from a court seal dating back to 1520. It shows waves of the Neckar River below and a row of plants above.

== Culture and sights ==
=== Buildings ===
Prominent features include the Catholic St. Jakobus Church and the Protestant Matthäuskirche.

The industrial character of Neckarau is shaped by the Grosskraftwerk Mannheim, built in 1921.

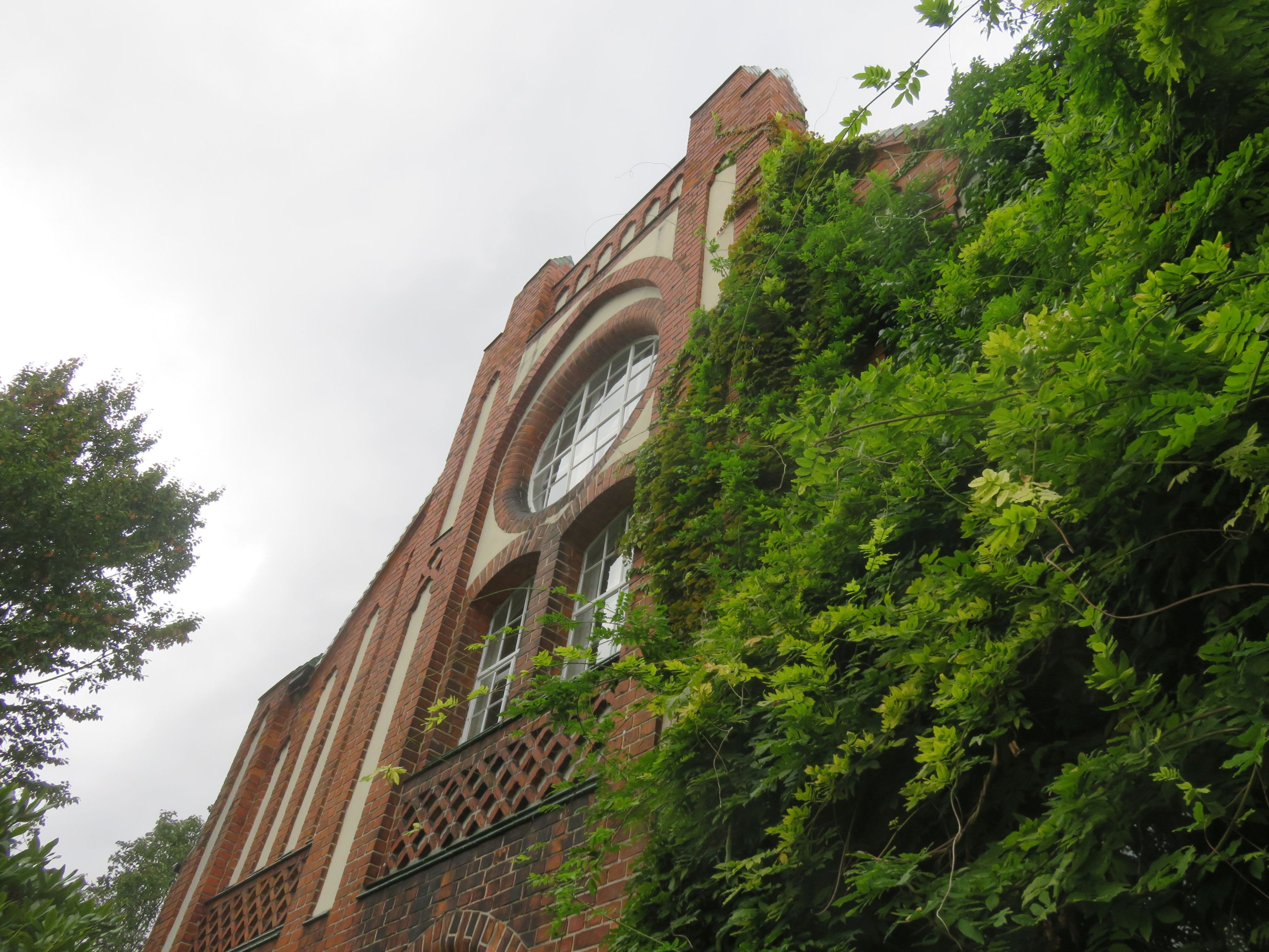
Old pumping station

The former pumping station, built in 1903, is a preserved industrial monument and was designated “Monument of the Month” in February 2004 by the Baden-Württemberg Monument Foundation.

=== Recreation ===
The August-Bebel Park lies between Neckarau and Almenhof. The Waldpark includes protected areas such as “Silberpappel” and “Reißinsel”.

=== Leisure ===
Facilities include a swimming hall, outdoor pools at Stollenwörthweiher, and the Rhine beach area. The district also hosts numerous clubs and cultural institutions.

== Economy and infrastructure ==
=== Companies ===
The Grosskraftwerk Mannheim is located in Neckarau. Historically important companies include Südkabel, Joseph Vögele AG, and Baktat International.

From 2011 to 2015, chef Juan Amador operated a three-Michelin-star restaurant in the district.

=== Transport ===
Public transport is operated by Rhein-Neckar-Verkehr with tram lines 1, 3, and 8. The Neckarau stop on the Mannheim–Rastatt railway has been served by the S9 line since December 2020. The B 36 connects Neckarau to Mannheim city center and nearby motorways.
