= Arcus-Air =

German airline

Arcus-Air & Cosmos Air

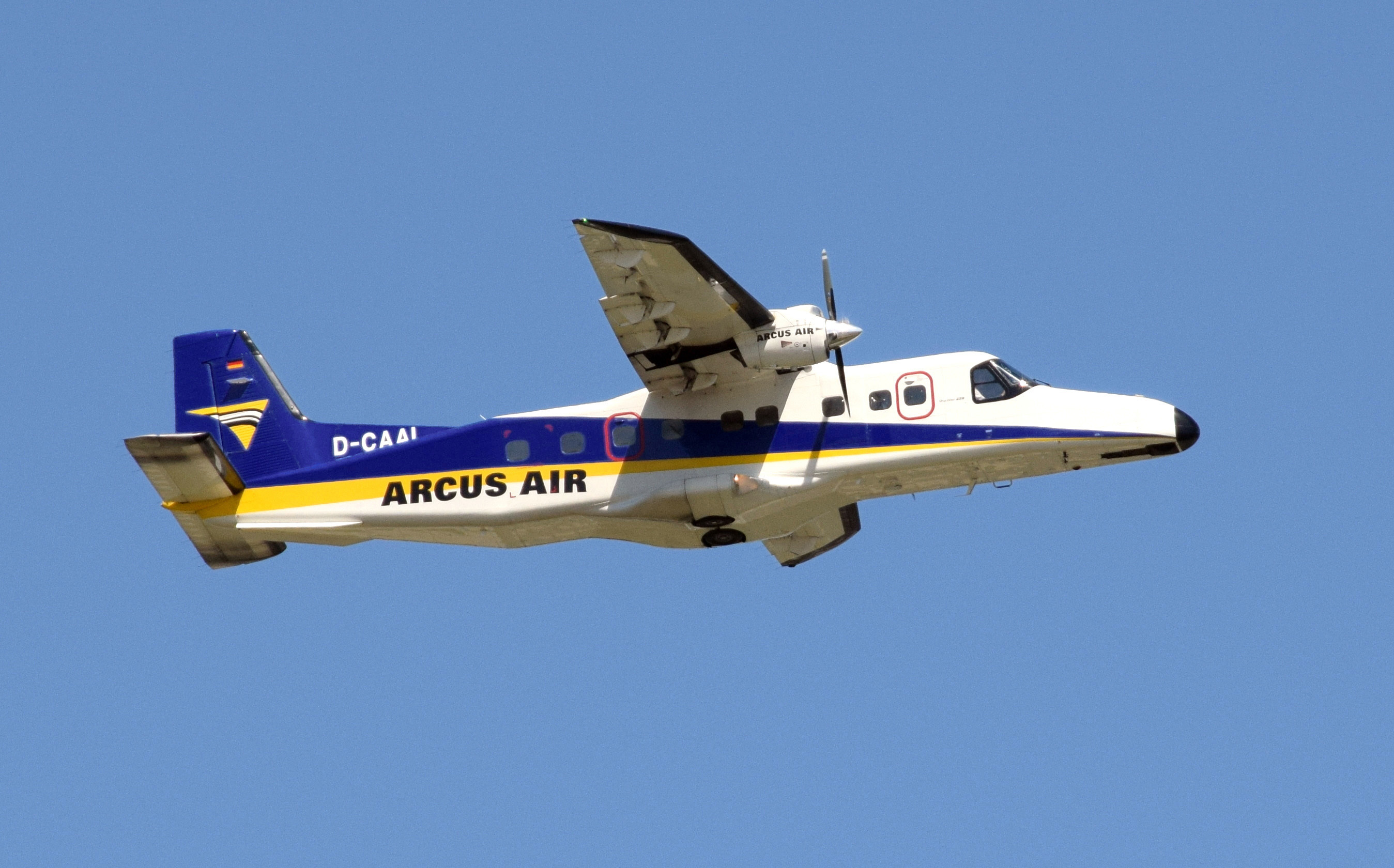
- Dornier 228
IATA	ICAO	Call sign
ZE	AZE	ARCUS AIR
- Founded: 1973
- Ceased operations: 1999
- Hubs: Mannheim City Airport
- Fleet size: 9
- Parent company: Avia Solutions Group
- Headquarters: Zweibrücken, Germany
- Website: arcus-air.com

Arcus Air Taxi was founded in 1973 to operate private flights and air taxis. In 1980, the name was changed to Arcus-Air Logistics GmbH, which continued its previous activities. The first scheduled flights, from Mannheim to Oberpfaffenhofen, began in 1987. They were followed by those to Leipzig and Dresden in the early 1990s, following the German Reunification. In 1996, the name was changed to Arcus-Air Luftfahrtunternehmen, but on April 1, 1997, all flight operations were transferred to Cosmos Air.

== Cosmos Air ==
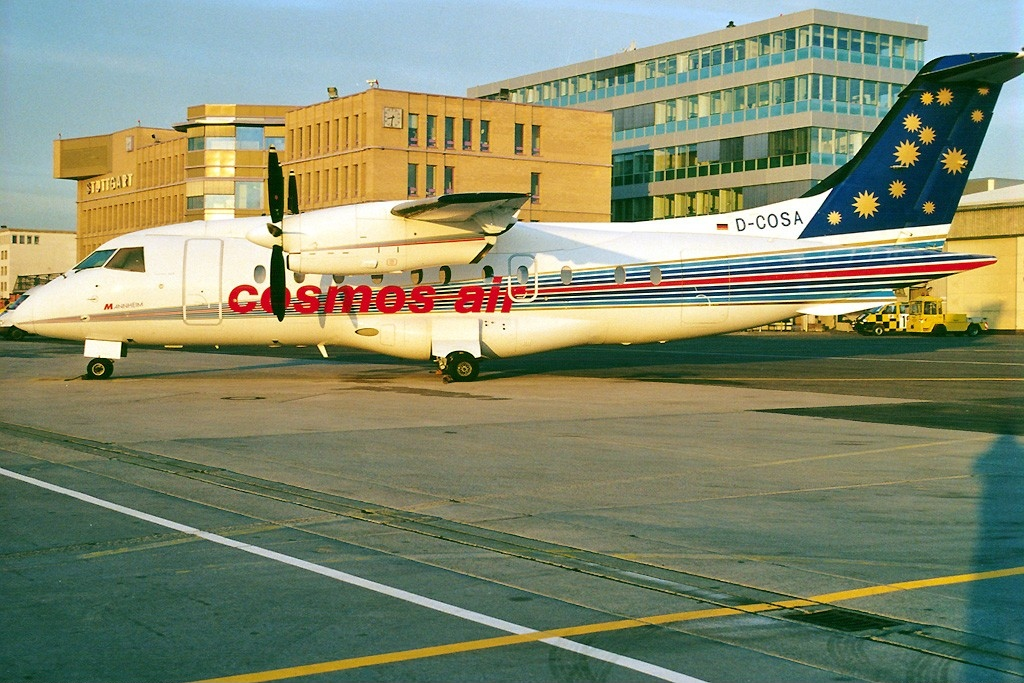
Dornier 328

Cosmos Air Luft GmbH was a subsidiary, founded on 1 April 1997, which operated scheduled flights from Mannheim to Berlin and London, using the respective city-centre airports London City Airport and now-closed Tempelhof Airport, using Dornier 328 aircraft. Former Arcus-Air Luftfahrtunternehmen operations began at the same time. The fleet consisted of two Dornier 228s and one Dornier 328. Charter operations were also carried out. The main operating base of the company, which was associated with Arcus-Air Logistics, was Neustheim airport (Troisdorf).

In June 1999, Cosmos Air was sold to Cirrus Airlines, bringing an end to scheduled flights.

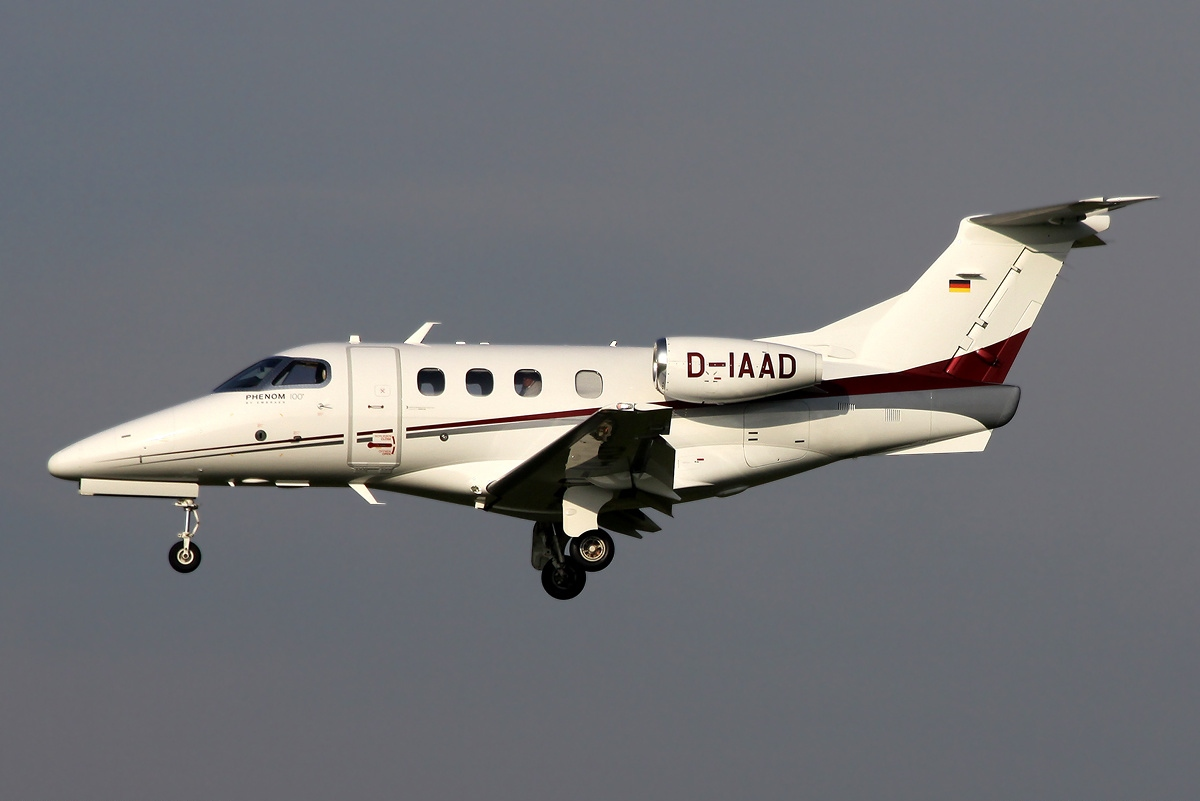
Embraer Phenom 100

Arcus Executive Aviation was based in Zweibrücken, Germany and Air Logistics in Troisdorf, Germany operating chartered cargo and corporate flights out of Mannheim City Airport. On 18 June 2020 Air Logistics and Arcus Air OBC were acquired by Chapman Freeborn, a subsidiary of Avia Solutions Group.

== Fleet ==
=== Current fleet ===
As of July 2026, Arcus-Air operates the following aircraft:

Aircraft type	In service	Remarks
Embraer ERJ 135	1	
Embraer ERJ 145	1	
Total	2	

=== Former fleet ===
As of November 2024, the Arcus-Air fleet consisted of the following aircraft:

Aircraft type	In service	Remarks
Embraer Phenom 100	7	
Dornier 228	2	
Total	9	
