= Colin Cummings =

American air hockey player

Colin Cummings (born April 15, 1999) is an American 12-time air hockey world champion.

== Air hockey career ==
Cummings began playing air hockey at the age of 10 at a neighbor's house. He became the #1 ranked junior air hockey player within two years.

In 2015, Cummings won the AHPA Air Hockey World Championship. At 16 years old, he became the youngest air hockey world champion in the sport's history, earning him a Guinness World Record. Cummings has since dominated the sport, winning the USAA World Championships in 2016 and consecutively from 2019 through 2024. He also claimed AHPA titles every year from 2015 to 2019.

Cummings plays an attacking style and relies on frequent puck movement to outmaneuver opponents.

== Personal life ==
Cummings attended Kelly Catholic School. In 2016, he expressed interest in joining the United States Air Force; he went on to fulfill that goal and currently serves as a First Lieutenant.

His father was a formerly global ranked competitive air hockey player.
