= Tabletop sports =

Games of physical skill played on a tabletop

Tabletop sports are sports that are played on a tabletop, but usually excluding mind sports. Unlike other tabletop games, tabletop sports require physical dexterity, and (to differentiate from other dexterity games like Jenga) usually some degree of physical athleticism. Examples include table football, sports table football, button football, table tennis, headis, teqball, cue sports, air hockey, pinball, showdown and table hockey games. They are usually played indoors.
