= Tim Weissman =

Tim Weissman (born 1970) is a clinical psychologist and ten-time world champion in the sport of professional air hockey. He is a major subject of the documentary Way of the Puck. He is credited for creating a move called the "circle drift." He has also been referred to as "the Kasparov of air hockey."
