= John Stull (scientist) =

American engineer and astronomer

- Born: 1930; Dansville New York
- Died: November 9, 2012 (aged 82); Almond New York
- Education: Alfred University BE MS PhD
- Scientific career
- Fields: Ceramic engineering Astronomy

John Stull (1930 — November 9, 2012) was an American scientist and engineer and a former professor of astronomy at Alfred University in Alfred, New York. He was a proponent of the creation of an observatory on the Alfred University campus in 1966. He is credited with building or rebuilding nearly all the telescopes in the observatory, which was renamed in his honor in 1989. He was also known for inventing the air track system, a scientific device used to study motion in a low friction environment.

In 1997, asteroid 31113 Stull was named for Stull, following its discovery by Scott Weaver and David DeGraff using a telescope Stull designed and built.

== Personal life ==
Stull was born in 1930 in Dansville, New York.

Stull graduated magna cum laude in 1952 and then received a PhD from Alfred University in ceramic engineering. He was only the second university student to receive a PhD in ceramic engineering at the time. He then went on to join the faculty at Alfred University in 1958 and retired in 1992, spending his entire career at Alfred.

In 1963, Stull invented the Stull-Ealing linear air track, a low-friction device used in physics instruction which has been marketed worldwide. The concept for the low-friction device would go on to be the basis of the air hockey table.

Stull died November 9, 2012, at the age of 82 in Almond, New York.

== Awards ==
Following his retirement in 1992, Stull continued active work at Alfred University. Stull was awarded of the Alfred University Friend Award in 2002 and the Lillian T. Nevins Award for lifetime service to the university in 2011.
