= Angle of incidence =

Angle of incidence is a measure of deviation of something from "straight on" and may refer to:

- Angle of incidence (optics), describing the approach of a ray to a surface
- Angle of incidence (aerodynamics), angle between a wing chord and the longitudinal axis
- Angle of attack, sometimes called angle of incidence in British English
