= Animal transportation =

Animal transportation may refer to:

- Transportation of animals:
  - Transportation of animals
  - Pet travel
  - Livestock transportation
  - Animal transporter
- Transportation by animals:
  - Animal-powered transport
  - Pack animal

== See also ==
- Animal locomotion
