= Golf (billiards) =

Snooker variant

Golf billiards (also referred to as simply golf in clear context, and sometimes called golf pool or golf pocket billiards) is a pocket billiards game usually played for money. Unlike the majority of such games, it allows more than two people to play without compromises or rule changes. The game borrows from the outdoor game of golf, which is historically related to the cue sports. It is usually played on 10-foot or 12-foot snooker tables as their size and structure are more appropriate. In 2006 the Billiard Congress of America commented it was more popular than snooker in the United States.

== Rules ==
The players each receive a numbered object ball. Using some method such as the lag, an order is established, and the players always shoot in that order.

The pockets are assigned numbers, clockwise starting at the top right corner pocket as viewed from the top (head) of the table, as the 1 hole (or 1 pocket) through 6 hole. The object for each player is to pocket (pot) their own object ball in the 1 hole, 2 hole, 3 hole, etc., in ascending order.

The first player places their numbered ball on the foot spot. The player may then place the cue ball in the "D" area as in snooker, or on a "D"-less American-style table, in the kitchen (i.e., behind the head string).

The player attempts to pocket his ball in the 1 hole. If they succeed, the object ball is spotted again and they proceed, playing with the cue ball as it lies, to the next hole, otherwise it is the next shooter's turn, who also shoots the cue ball from the "D" or kitchen at their numbered ball on the foot spot, aiming for the 1 hole. An object ball not pocketed is left on the table.

Once all players have taken their first shot, players shoot with the cue ball wherever it lies after the previous shot. Note that it is possible for the first player to win the game without any other player getting to shoot. It is possible to run the 1,2,3,4,5,6 holes but highly unlikely on a snooker table as compared to a pool table, due to the rounded, thus narrower pockets.

If the player before the incoming shooter committed a foul, and the new shooter is snookered (does not have a clear shot to his ball), the ball(s) in the way may be temporarily moved (gets A lift) so that the shooter has a clear shot. These must be put back after the shot. This rule is highly unusual, perhaps even unique, in the world of cue sports, and often unused even in golf. (this only occurs if the shooter did not hit his ball first, not necessarily on a cue ball foul)

The game is won when one player legally pockets his ball into the 6 hole.

In some more advanced versions of golf, wooden pegs (AKA skittles) are placed on all spots except for the Black spot, and floating red snooker balls are placed in the middle of each cushion. Knocking over a pin results in a pre-defined number of "penalty strokes" added to the offender's score, and they must then also restart the current hole. The red balls are not penalties in themselves. But as they get hit by player's object or cue balls as the game progresses, the red balls end up "floating" about the table, creating roaming obstacles and making the game much more difficult, particularly when a larger number of players (i.e. 4–8) are involved.

=== Scoring ===
Players are assigned a certain predetermined value for each foul committed. These are known as "hickeys". Players owe each player the difference between their hickey count and that player's count. The game is also usually assigned a base value which is given to the winner by the losing players.

=== Fouls ===
The following constitute fouls (faults):

- Causing any ball to leave the table. If it is the cue ball, it is spotted by the next shooter on the D. Any other ball is spotted as close as possible to the foot spot.
- Pocketing a ball in the wrong hole.
- Failing to hit the shooter's ball first or at all.
- Failing to do one of the following:

1. Legally pocket the player's object ball
2. Contact a cushion with any ball after a legal hit
3. Kick the cue ball off a cushion to a legal hit.

== "Around-the-world" variant ==
In New Hampshire, a local variant that has been subject to organized tournament play since 1947 in the Queen City Pool League, is called "around-the-world" or "roundy" for short. It differs from standard golf pool in several ways:

- The pockets, beginning with the same pocket as the standard game, are numbered counter-clockwise, and the table is a standard 4.5 foot by 9 foot pool table, not a snooker table, and ball-in-hand shots are taken from behind the head string, as there is no "D".
- All players use the same target object ball (the 1 ball).
- All of the object balls are racked in a triangle with the apex ball on the foot spot, and the game opened with a hard break (as in eight-ball); the 1 ball is played from where it lies after the break (unless pocketed on the break, in which case it is spotted back on the foot spot just as if it had been legally pocketed.)
- Scoring is simpler: 0 to 6 points, for the number of 1 ball shots successfully made, and there are no "hickeys"; whoever reaches 6 points first wins that game. A match consists of five games.
- Failure to contact a cushion with a ball is not a foul (as a consequence, particularly challenging safeties can be set up).
- One may shoot at any ball, and use other balls to pocket the 1 ball; there is no requirement that the 1 ball be hit first or even at all.
- One may shoot at and pocket any ball other than the 1 ball into any called pocket (for no point award), and continue play; this is usually done to gain a better position on the 1 ball to pocket it in the necessary pocket. Balls pocketed in this manner are not returned to the table during the game. Pocketing the 1 ball into the wrong pocket remains a foul.
- If a shot fails to contact any object ball at all, the opponent may optionally require (in lieu of taking the turn) that the original shooter to re-shoot the shot from the original cue ball position (a subsequent failure ends the original shooter's turn, spots the 1 ball and gives the incoming player ball-in-hand behind the headstring) (Compare the push-out in nine-ball.)
- Jump shots were banned in the tournament rules as of 1996 due to equipment damage concerns.
