= Danny Hynes =

American air hockey player

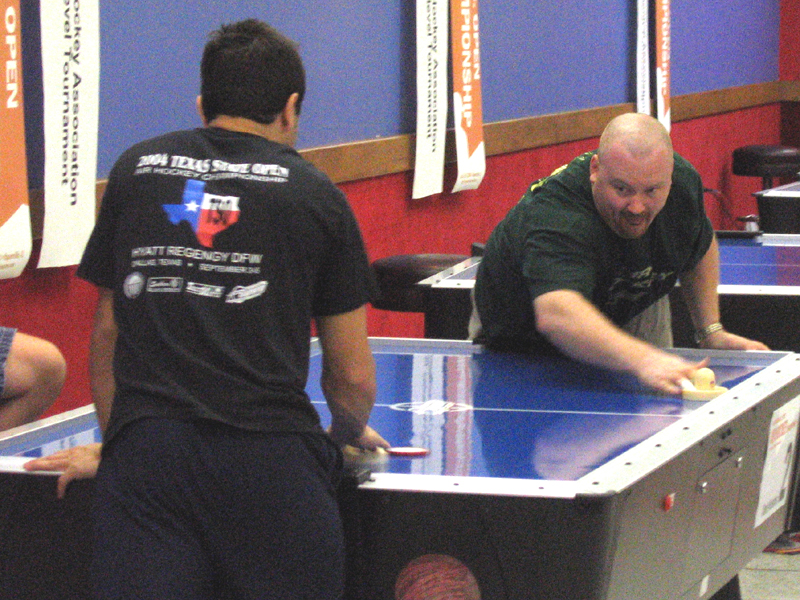
Air hockey champion Danny Hynes in 2005

Danny Hynes of Houston is a top ranked air hockey player who has won eleven world titles and ten national titles.
