= Neuostheim/Neuhermsheim =

Suburb of Mannheim, Germany

Coordinates: 49.466°N 8.509°E

Neuostheim/Neuhermsheim is a suburb of the city of Mannheim, Germany, composed of Neuostheim and Neuhermsheim and is considered to be one of the more attractive neighbourhoods of Mannheim. It is located 3.5 km (2.2 mi) east of the city centre. It lies on the River Neckar and an important lock on the Neckar Canal is situated between Neuostheim and the suburb of Feudenheim. Neuostheim is well connected to the city centre and to Heidelberg by tram, bus and highways. As Neuostheim is the location of Mannheim City Airport, several citizens´ groups have been fighting for years for better noise protection.
