= Air track =

Scientific device

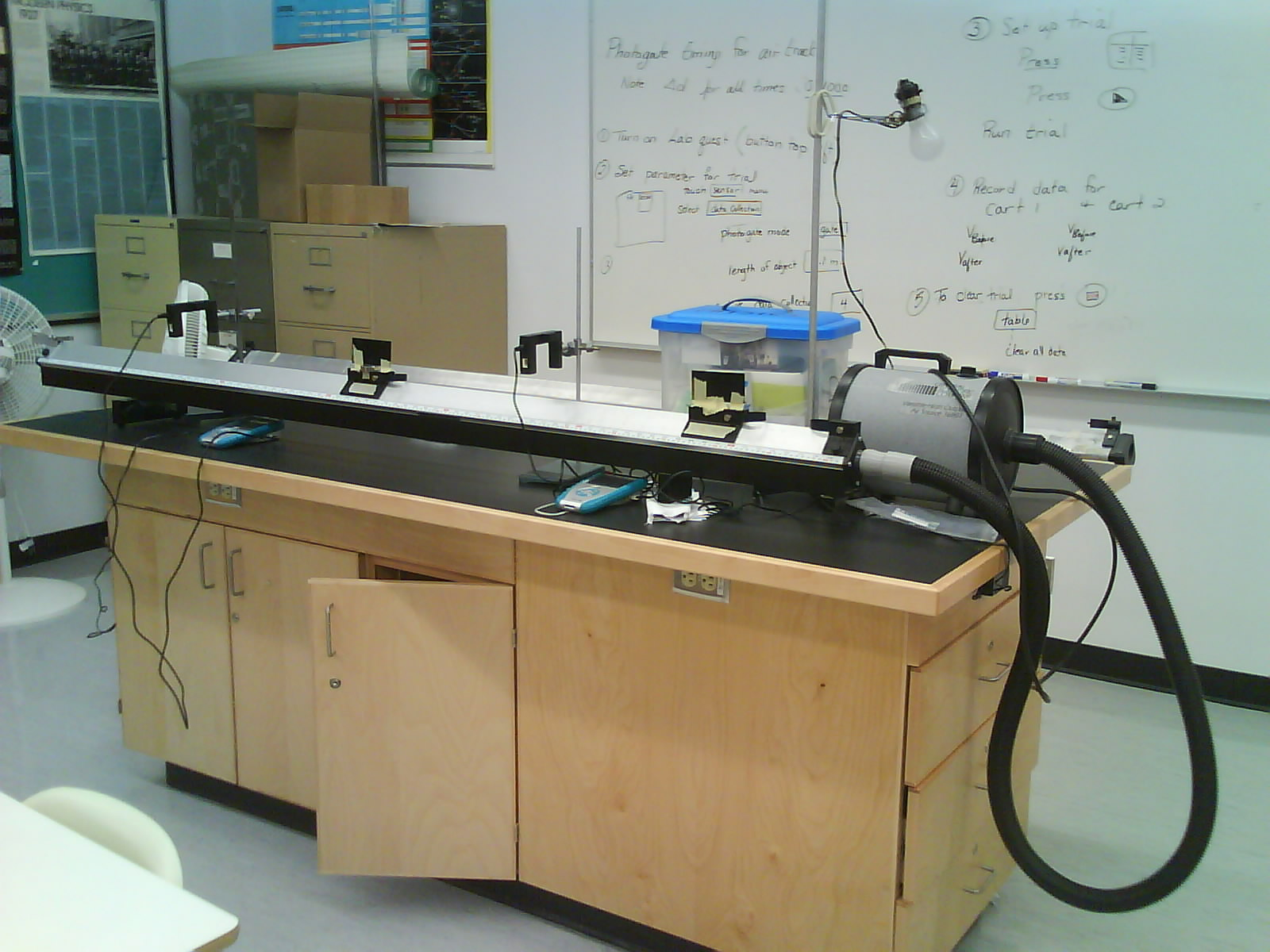
An air track at Sir Winston Churchill High School, Calgary, Alberta, Canada

An air track is a scientific device used to study motion in a low friction environment. Its name comes from its structure: air is pumped through a hollow track with fine holes all along the track that allows specially fitted air track cars to glide relatively friction-free. Air tracks are usually triangular in cross-section. Carts which have a triangular base and fit neatly on to the top of the track are used to study motion in low friction environments.

The air track is also used to study collisions, both elastic and inelastic. Since there is very little energy lost through friction it is easy to demonstrate how momentum is conserved before and after a collision. The track can be used to calculate the force of gravity when placed at an angle.

It was invented in the early 1960s at the California Institute of Technology by Prof Neher and Leighton. An early version was used on 28 October 1961 by Prof Feynman (and credited to Prof Neher) in his lecture on conservation of momentum. The construcion and operation of the "linear air trough" was published by Neher and Leighton in American Physical Society in 1963 and presented in NYC in 1965(?) where it was viewed by Prof John Stull, Alfred University, and Frank Ferguson, the Ealing Corporation. The original track was about 1 meter long with tiny air orifices and highly compressed air. Stull returned to Alfred University, where he developed a simple version using standard square aluminum tubing with large air orifices and air from the vent of a shop vacuum cleaner. With Ferguson's help at Ealing, Stull designed a custom aluminum track that Ealing offered commercially in various lengths up to 10 meters. T. Walley Williams III at Ealing extended the concept to the 2-dimensional air table in 1969.
