= Österman =

Österman is a Swedish-language surname.

== Geographical distribution ==
As of 2014, 56.5% of all known bearers of the surname Österman were residents of Sweden (frequency 1:8,310), 39.9% of Finland (1:6,567) and 2.4% of Estonia (1:26,433).

In Sweden, the frequency of the surname was higher than national average (1:8,310) in the following counties:

1. Stockholm County (1:3,764)
2. Södermanland County (1:4,047)
3. Uppsala County (1:4,602)
4. Örebro County (1:6,068)
5. Värmland County (1:7,301)
6. Gotland County (1:7,310)

In Finland, the frequency of the surname was higher than national average (1:6,567) in the following regions:

1. Åland (1:1,700)
2. Satakunta (1:2,113)
3. Southwest Finland (1:2,251)
4. Uusimaa (1:3,893)

== People ==
- Bernhard Österman (1870–1938), Swedish painter, illustrator and curator
- Emil Österman (1870–1927), Swedish painter, illustrator and academician
- Hugo Österman (1892–1975), Finnish general
- Hans Österman (born 1978), ITHF table hockey world champion and journalist from Sweden
