= List of hockey world championships =

Hockey world championships include:

== On the ground ==
=== Field hockey ===
- Men's FIH Hockey World Cup
- Women's FIH Hockey World Cup
- Men's FIH Hockey Junior World Cup
- Women's FIH Hockey Junior World Cup

=== Hockey5s ===
- FIH Hockey5s World Cup

=== Indoor hockey ===
- Men's Indoor Hockey World Cup
- Women's Indoor Hockey World Cup

== On ice ==
=== Ice hockey ===
- Ice Hockey World Championships, the most important IIHF international ice-hockey competitions
- World Pond Hockey Championships, playing the pond hockey variant of ice-hockey
- IIHF World U18 Championship, for ice-hockey
- IIHF World Women Championship, for ice-hockey
- IIHF World Women's U18 Championships, for ice hockey
- IIHF World U20 Championship (World Junior Hockey Championship), for ice-hockey
- Ice hockey at the Winter Olympics had world championship status until 1976

=== Sledge hockey ===
- IPC Ice Sledge Hockey World Championships, for sledge hockey

=== Bandy ===
Bandy is also sometimes called "Russian hockey", "hockey with ball" or "winter football"

- Bandy World Championship
- Women's Bandy World Championship
- Youth Bandy World Championship
  - Bandy World Championship G-17
  - Bandy World Championship Y-19
  - Bandy World Championship Y-23
- Bandy World Cup
- Bandy World Cup Women

== On floors ==
=== Roller hockey ===
- Men's Roller Hockey World Cup, for Roller hockey (Quad)
- Women's Roller Hockey World Cup (CIRH Women's World Cup), for Roller hockey (Quad)
- Roller Hockey World Cup U-20, for Roller hockey (Quad)
- Rink hockey World Club Championship, for Roller hockey (Quad)
- IIHF Inline Hockey World Championship, for Roller hockey (Inline)
- FIRS Inline Hockey World Championships (FIRS World Championships), for Roller hockey (Inline)
- FIRS Inline Hockey World Junior Championships, for Roller hockey (Inline)
- FIRS Inline Hockey World Women Championships, for Roller hockey (Inline)

=== Floorball ===
- Floorball World Championships

== On table tops ==
=== Table hockey ===
- World Championship/s, for ITHF table hockey
- World Women Championship/s, for ITHF table hockey
- World Junior Championship/s, for ITHF table hockey
- World Veteran/Senior Championship/s, for ITHF table hockey
- World Men's Team Championship, for ITHF table hockey
- World Women's Team Championship, for ITHF table hockey
- World Club Championship, for ITHF table hockey

=== Air hockey ===
- World Championships, for air hockey

== See also ==
- Ice hockey at the Olympic Games
- Field hockey at the Summer Olympics
- World Cup
