= Emil Österman =

Swedish painter, illustrator, and academic (1870–1927)

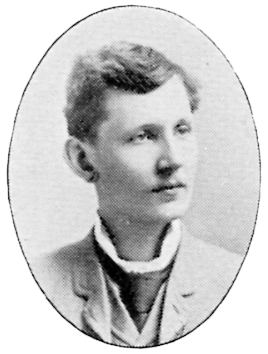
Emil Österman, from the Svenskt Porträttgalleri XX

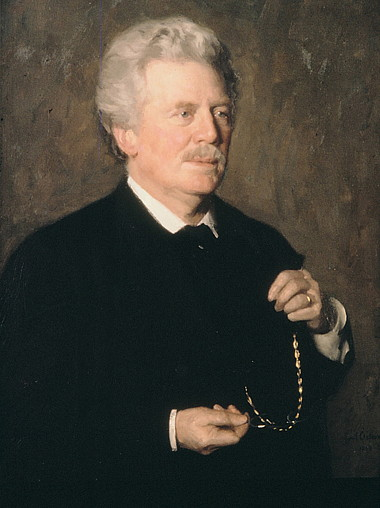
Portrait of Gustaf Retzius (1907)

Carl Emil Österman (11 January 1870, Västra Vingåker Parish, Södermanland – 8 March 1927, Stockholm) was a Swedish painter, illustrator, and academic. His twin brother, Bernhard, was also an artist.

== Biography ==
His father was a dye master. From 1890 to 1893, he studied at the Royal Swedish Academy of Fine Arts and was awarded the Royal Medal for his depiction of the murder of Axel von Fersen. While there, he also took lessons in etching from Axel Tallberg. From 1894 to 1898, thanks to several scholarships, he was able to visit Italy, the Netherlands, Belgium, France, Germany and Spain. He became a member of the Academy in 1900 and, from 1901 to 1908, taught education there. In 1914, he was appointed Vice-Professor of Painting. He served as Sweden's official Commissioner at art exhibitions in Munich in 1905, 1909 and 1913, as well as in Vienna (1910) and Brighton (1911).

Like his brother, he became a well known portrait painter. An early joint showing with Bernhard, in 1903, was not very successful but, for many years, he was a member of the Svenska konstnärernas förening and participated in several of their exhibitions. He was also represented at the Venice Biennale in 1901 and 1926, the Schulte Exhibition of 1910 in Berlin, the Baltic Exhibition (1914), an international exhibit in Copenhagen at Charlottenborg Palace (1916) and a Swedish exhibition in London (1924).

A major retrospective of his work was held at the Royal Academy in 1928. His works may be seen at the Nationalmuseum, Nordiska museet, Stockholms stadshus and the Uppsala University Library. He was buried at the Norra begravningsplatsen near Stockholm.

== Sources ==
- Svenskt konstnärslexikon Part V, pgs. 821-822, Allhems Förlag, Malmö
