= Roni Nuttunen =

Finnish table hockey player

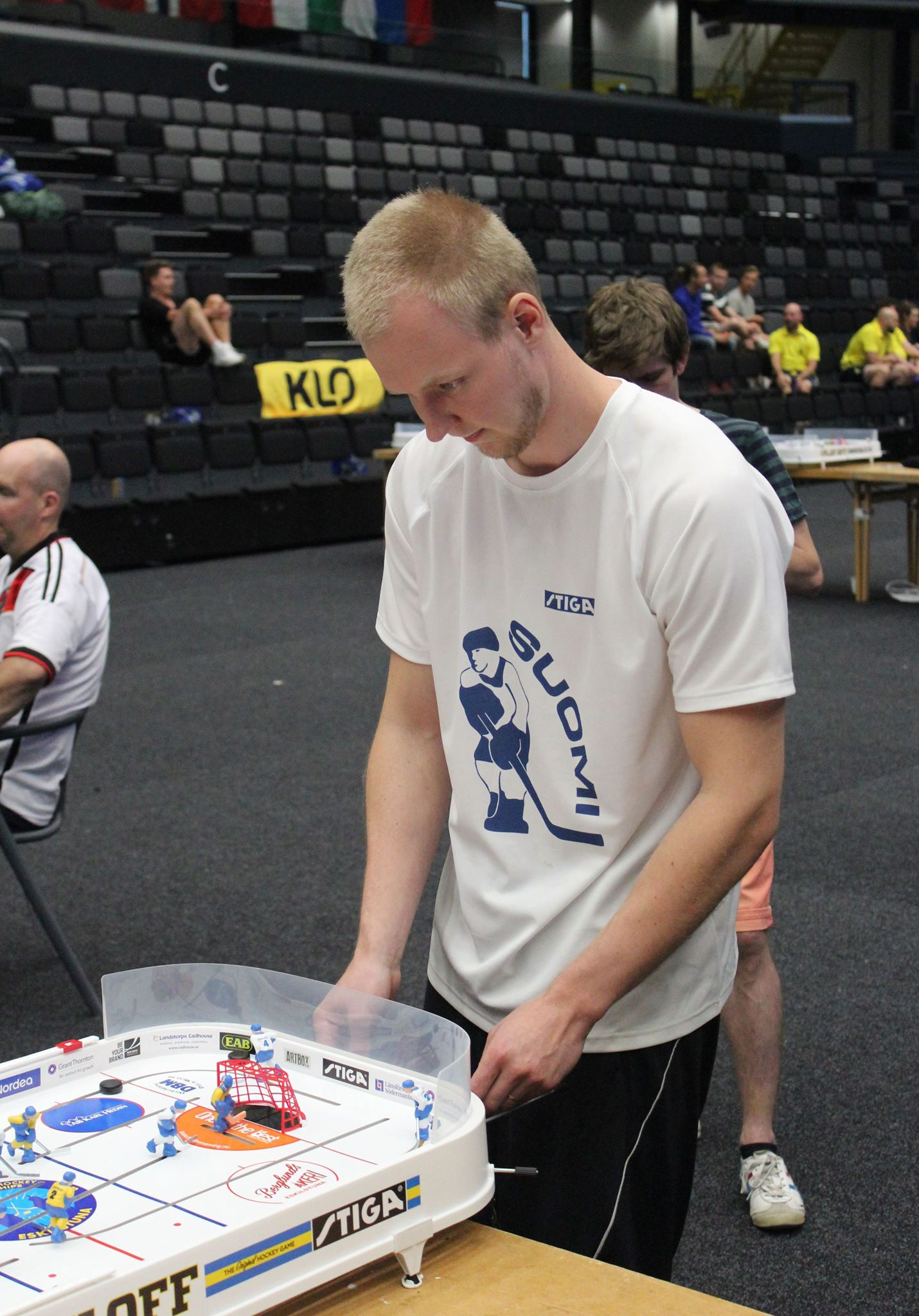
Roni Nuttunen in 2018.

Roni Nuttunen (born 1990) is an ITHF table hockey player from Finland who became world champion at seventeen. In 2007 Stefan Edwall described Roni Nuttunen as an "unbelievable player, the best since Lindahl." He remained champion until 2011 when he lost to Russian Oleg Dmitrichenko who became the first Russian World Champion.
