= Edwall =

Edwall may refer to:

- Edwall (surname)
- Edwall, Washington
