= Table hockey =

Game for two players, derived from ice hockey

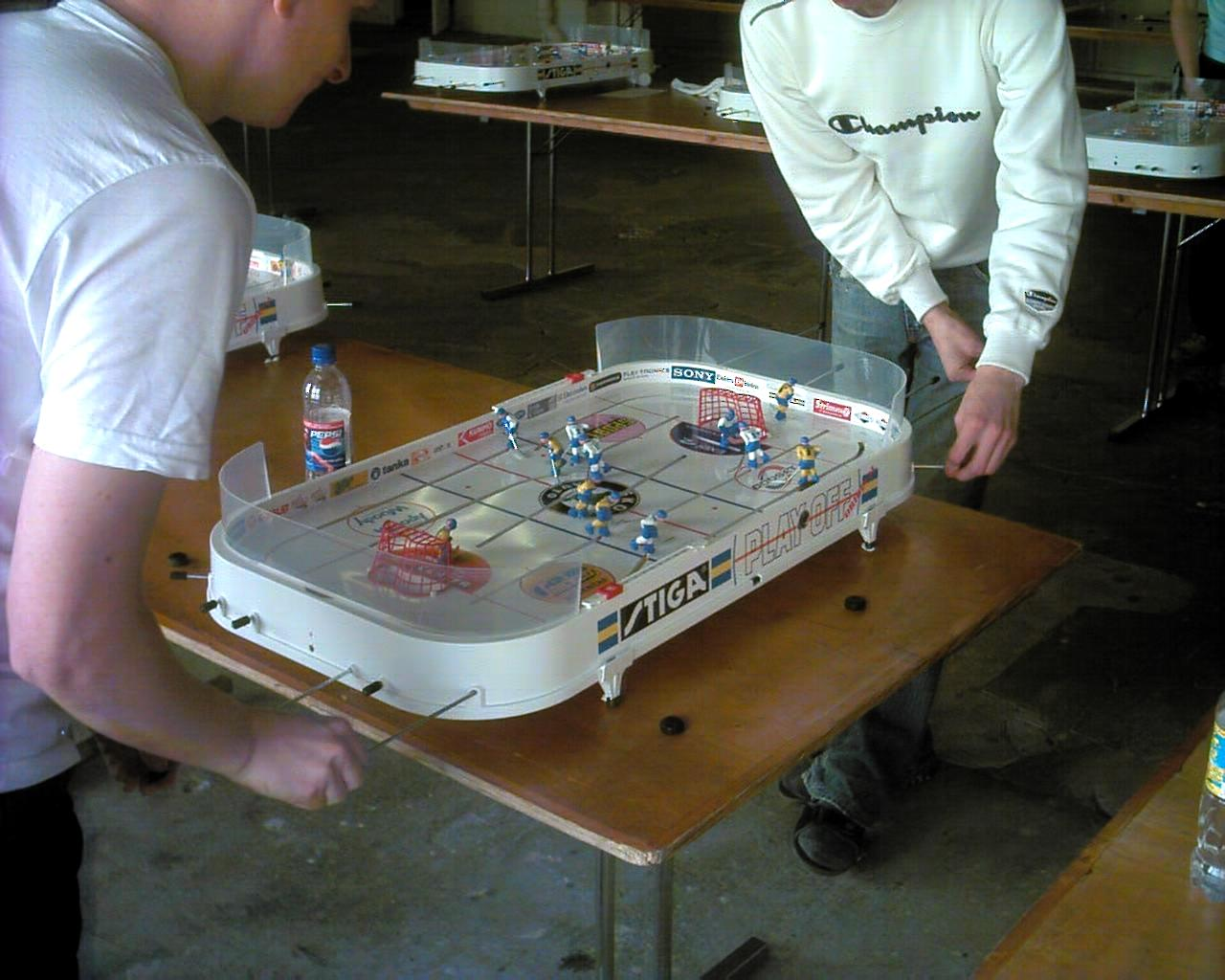
A Stiga table hockey game

A table hockey game, also called rod hockey game, stick hockey, bubble hockey, and board hockey, is a game for two players, derived from ice hockey. The game consists of a representation of a hockey rink; the players score goals by hitting a small puck into the opposing "net" with cutout figures that represent hockey players. The figures are manipulated by rods below the "ice": each one slides forward and back along its own narrow slot when the player pushes or pulls on the rod, or rotates (about a vertical axis) to shoot or stickhandle the puck when the player spins the rod. Though similar in concept to air hockey (commonly known as "glide hockey"), table hockey games are more of a simulation of the sport of ice hockey while air hockey is more abstract.

== Original table hockey ==
The game of table hockey was invented in 1932, by the Canadian Donald H. Munro Sr., in Toronto. Munro, like so many Canadians in the depths of the depression, was short of cash for Christmas presents. He had a wife and three young children. That year, the family all pitched in and made the first table hockey game. This mechanical game was built out of scrap wood and metal, and included used coat hanger wire, butcher's twine, clock springs, and lumber from the coal bin. Unlike current games, the game looked more like an early pinball game, with one key difference: this was a two player game. The playing surface had a peak in the middle and sloped down toward each end. The players controlled levers for the goalie and flippers for the players. The story goes that a travelling salesman noticed the game and encouraged Munro to take the game down to the local Eaton's department store. Munro did just that. The first game went in on a consignment deal. By the time Munro got home, the game was sold and more orders were placed.

== Manufacturers ==
There are many types of the game. The defunct Munro Games of Toronto, Ontario, Canada, manufactured the original variant of the game in Burlington, Ontario. Stiga Games in Sweden are used in the table hockey sport administered by the International Table Hockey Federation.

The game has also been played using a variety of commercial boards in North America since the 1920s. Rick Benej, of Greenwich, NY, has built table hockey games since the 1980s. His model has gone through three different designs and refinements over the years. The most popular board for many years was manufactured by the now-defunct Coleco company, and most North American boards (such as those built by The Carrom Company and Irwin toys) are a variant of this model. However, the Stiga board has begun to tap the North American market, even as other new boards continue to be introduced.

== Arcade version ==
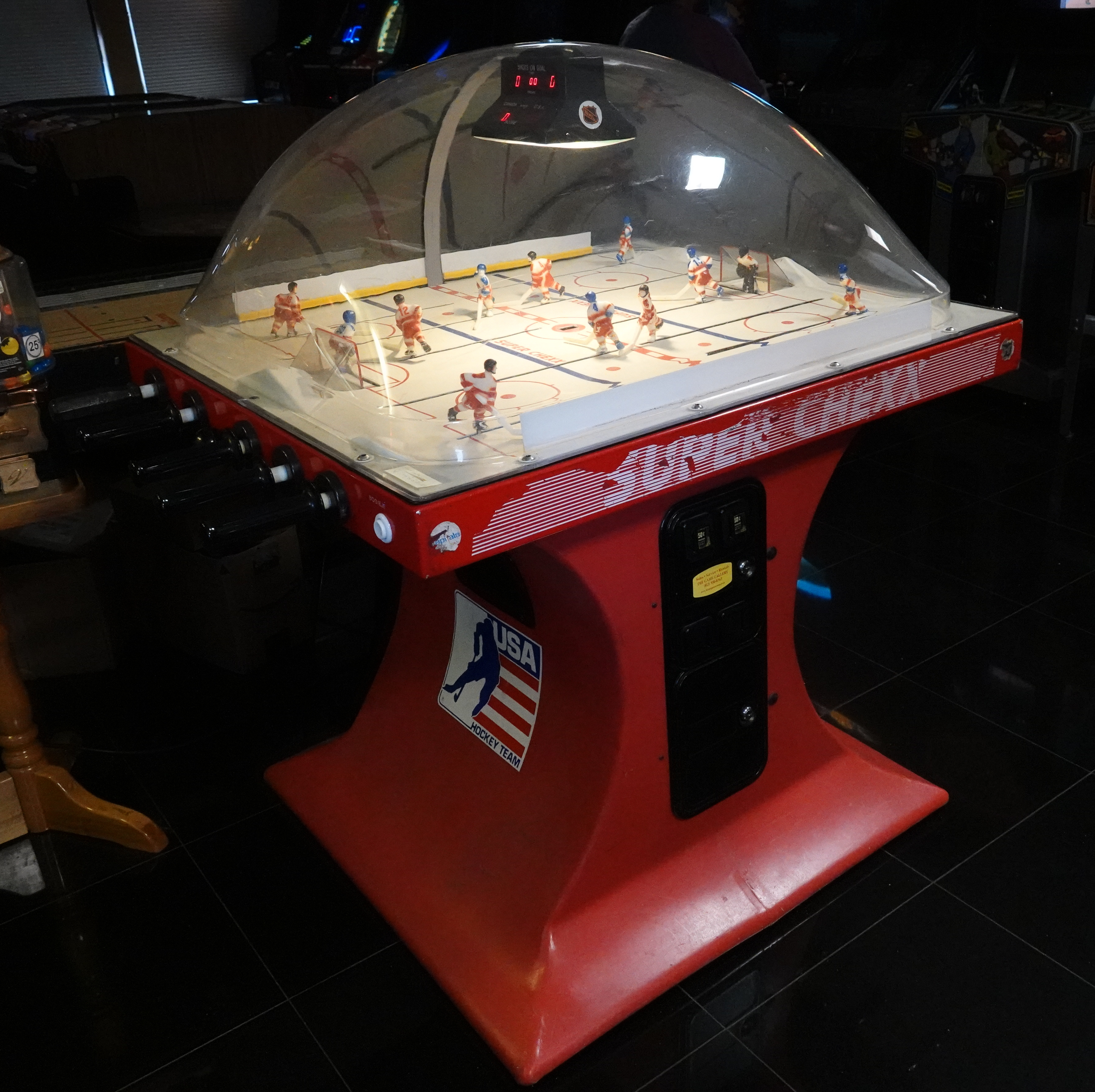
Super Chexx Canada vs. USA variant, photographed at Billy's Midway Arcade in 2025.

The arcade version is called 'dome hockey' or 'bubble hockey', because of the large plastic dome that covers the playing surface in order to prevent the puck either becoming lost or stolen. The most popular of these 'bubble hockey' tables is Chexx (USA vs. Soviet Union) and its successor, Super Chexx (Canada vs. USA). Super Chexx was the company that originally developed this game in the early 1980s. Later other companies also began to produce similar items.

== Game variations ==
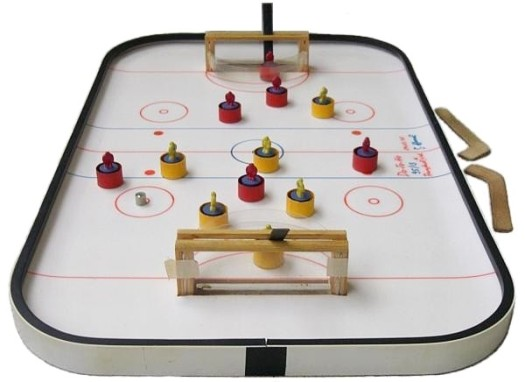
Do-To-Ho

Another table hockey game, called Do-To-Ho, is completely different from the other games specified here. The play figures are not fastened to bars, but are mobile on the whole playing field. In their bases, just like in the puck, there is a ball bearing, so they slide like ice skate runners over the board. Moving a play figure is done via a short, unique knock against the figure with a small stick as in billiards. The play courses take place alternating, there are 'attack courses', with which the puck may be played by a play figure, and 'position courses' (defense courses as well as offside release courses), with which a play figure only may change position without touching the puck. Puck possession changes, if the aggressor misses the puck or hits an opposing play figure. Do-To-Ho was developed in Germany and published in 1994.

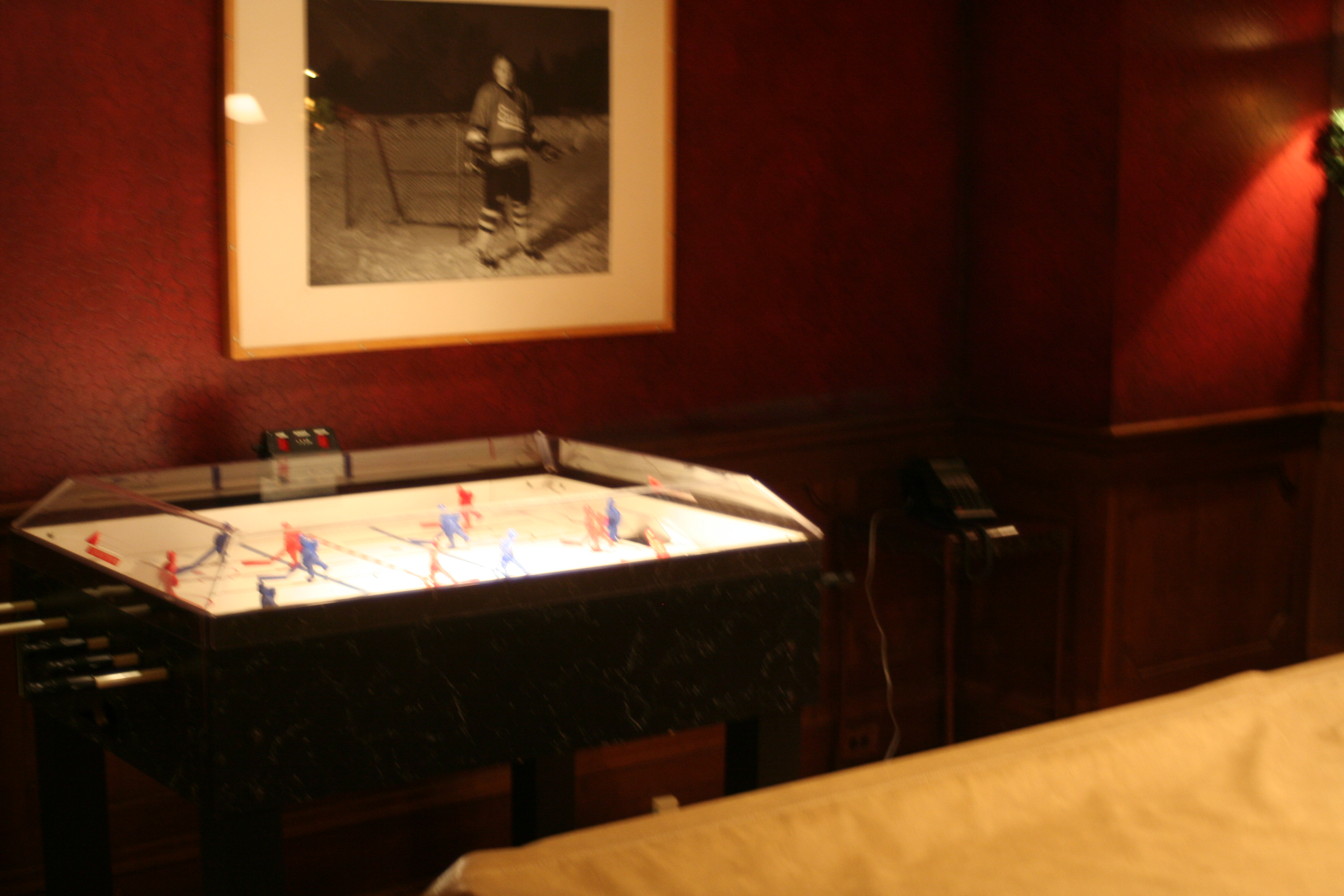
Basement of Minnesota Governor's Residence, 2007

Stiga also produces a similar board with a football theme.

== See also ==
- ITHF table hockey
- Air hockey
