= Bernhard Österman =

Swedish artist (1870–1938)

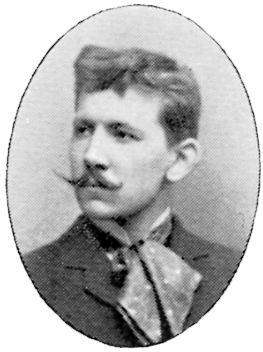
Bernhard Österman, from the Svenskt Porträttgalleri XX

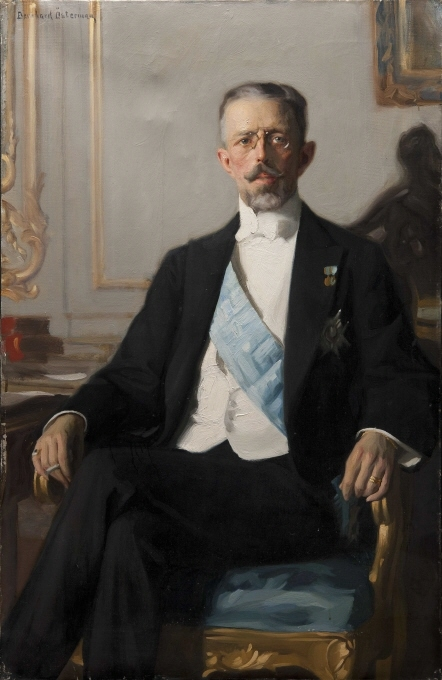
Portrait of King Gustav V (one of several)

Gustaf Bernhard Österman (11 January 1870, in Västra Vingåker Parish, Södermanland – 10 March 1938, in Stockholm) was a Swedish painter, illustrator and curator. His twin brother, Emil, was also an artist.

== Biography ==
His father was a dye master. His brother Emil had already started at the Royal Swedish Academy of Fine Arts when he followed him to Stockholm and entered the Tekniska skolan to prepare for studies at the academy. During this time, he painted portraits from photographs to support himself. He was finally admitted to the academy and was there from 1892 to 1895. Both brothers received good marks and Bernhard was awarded the Royal Medal. In 1896, he took private lessons in etching from Axel Tallberg.

Later, he received a travel scholarship that enabled him to visit the Netherlands, Belgium, France, Italy and Germany from 1897 to 1901. Although he originally studied history painting, he decided to become a portrait painter, as had his brother. They held a joint exhibition in 1903, but it was not very successful.

Soon after, he moved to Paris and opened a studio. He was much more successful there. By 1907, he was a member of the Royal Academy and, in 1919, was appointed a hovintendent (a type of supervisor) at the Royal Court of Sweden. In 1933, he was promoted to överintendent (in this case, as a curator).

He exhibited widely, receiving medals at the Louisiana Purchase Exhibition (1904), the Munich Fine Art Exhibition (1905) and the Baltic Exhibition (1914). He was named an honorary member of the Société Nationale des Beaux-Arts. Other showings were held in London (1928), Philadelphia (1928) and Washington (1931).

He is buried at the Norra begravningsplatsen. In 1948 his widow, Hilda (1880–1950), donated his remaining works to the Sörmlands museum in Nyköping. His works may also be seen at the Gothenburg Museum of Art, Skokloster Castle, Uppsala University and the Nationalmuseum. The library of the French Senate has his portrait of General Maxime Weygand.

== Gallery ==
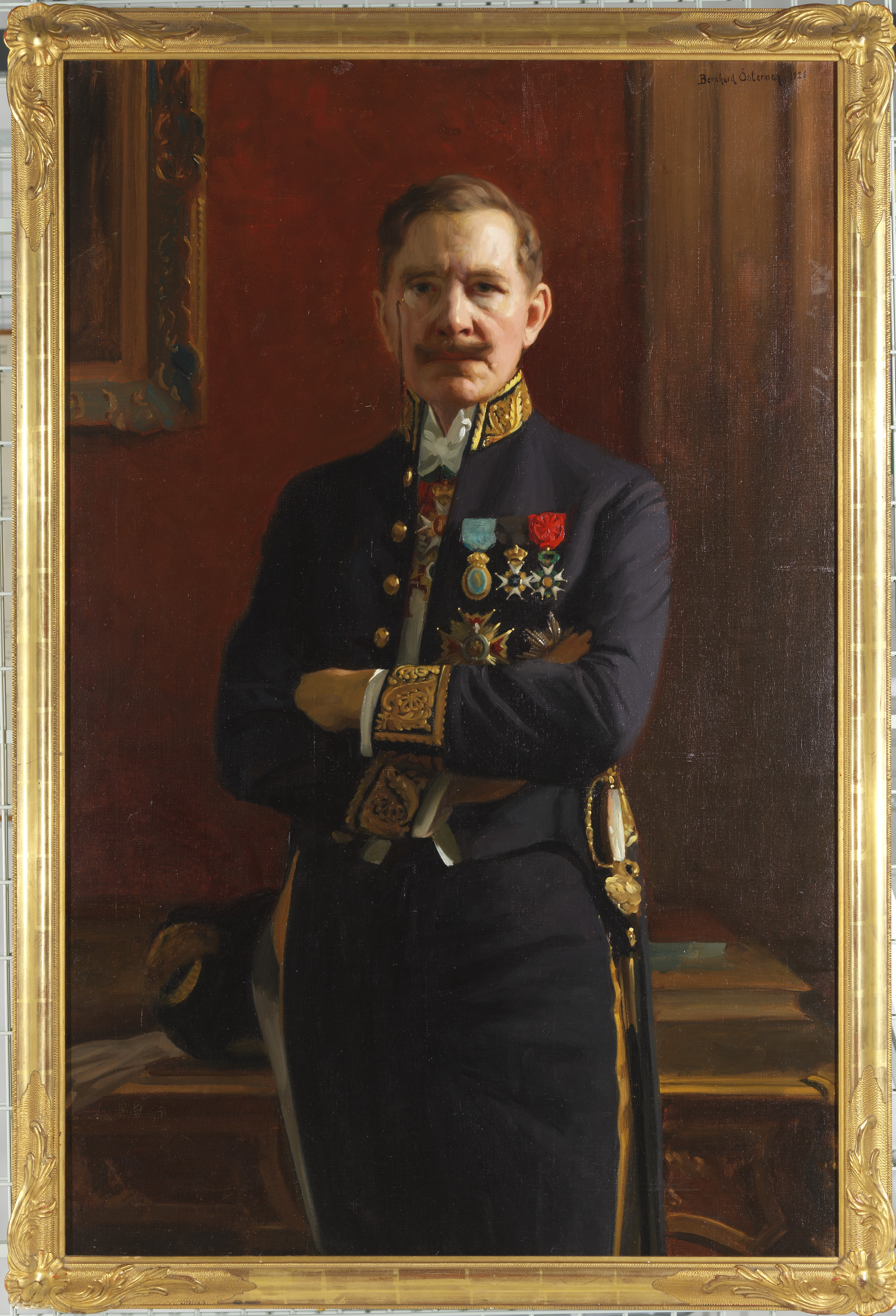
Self-portrait, 1918

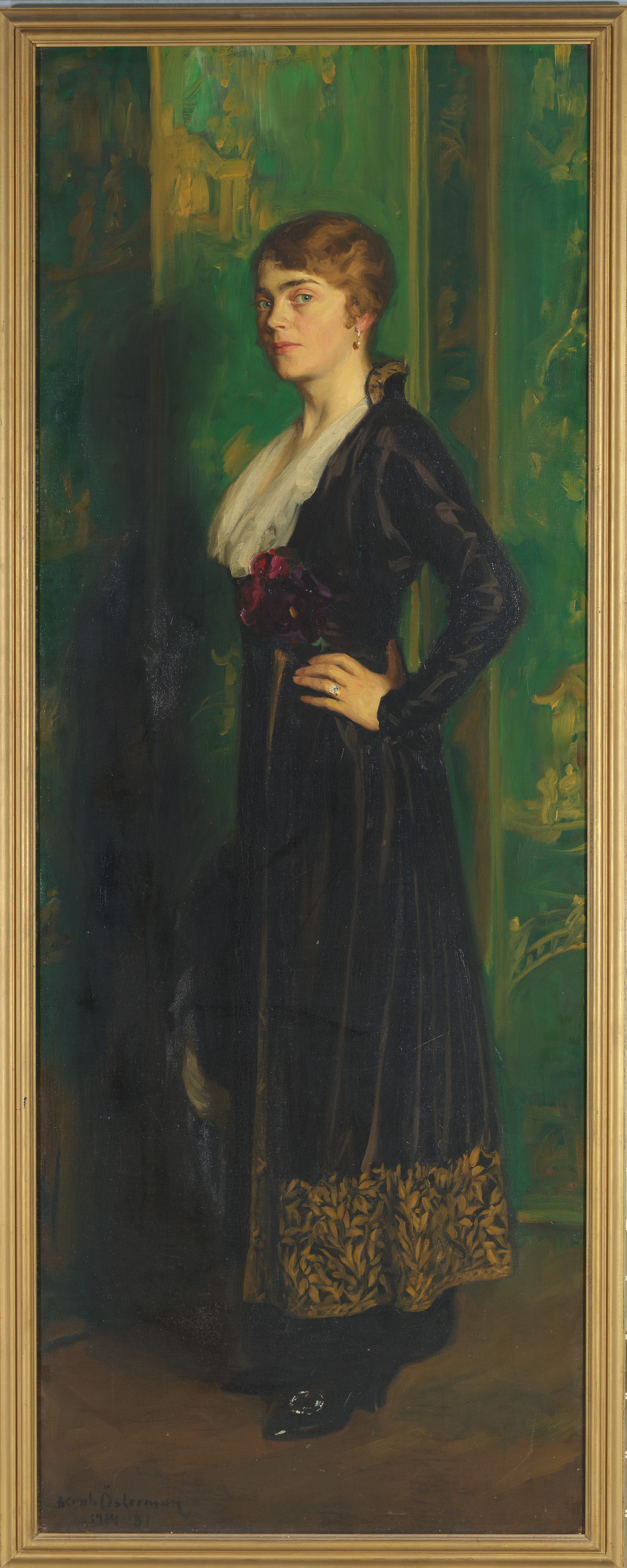
His wife Hilda Österman, née Wessén

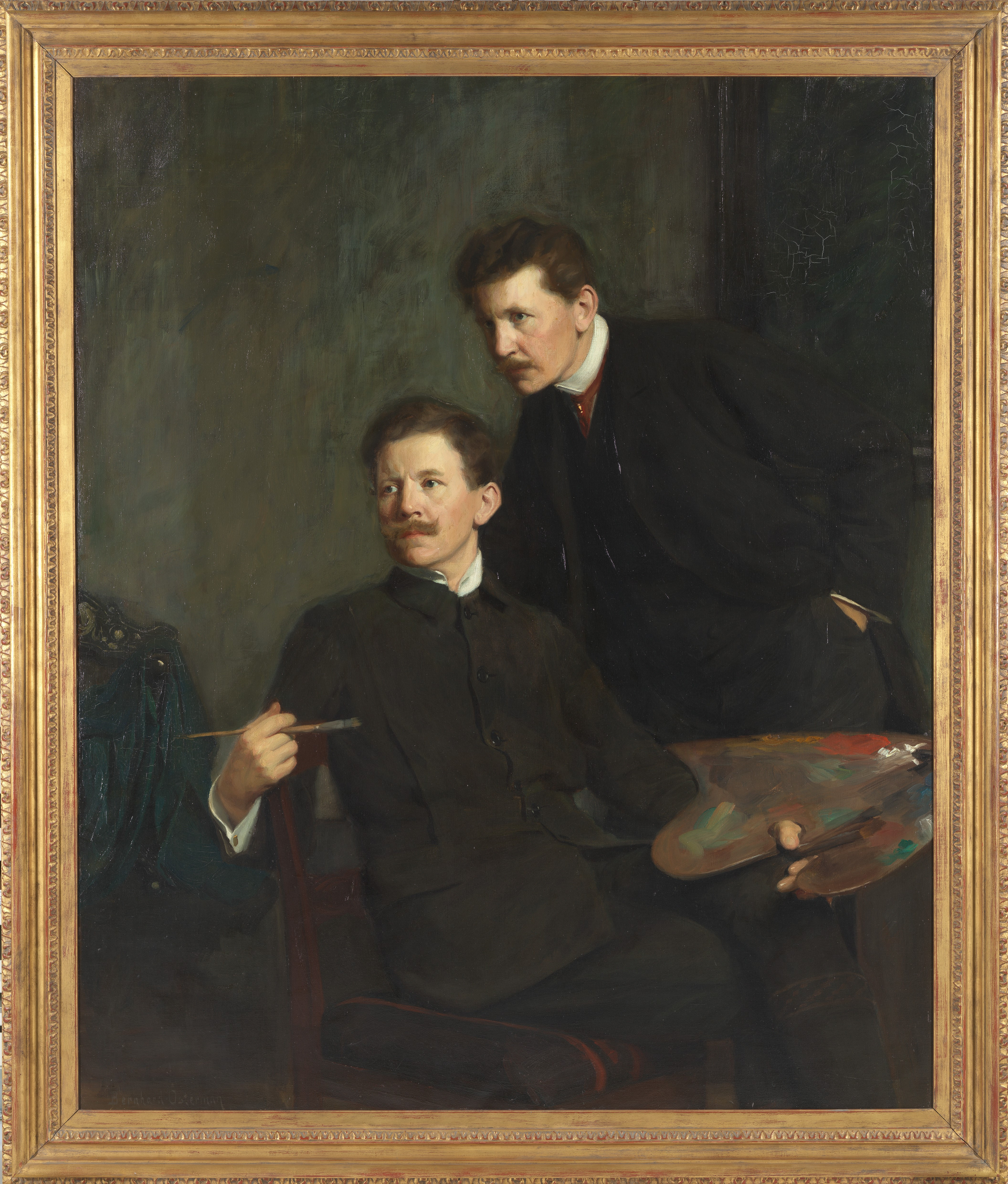
Bernhard and his
twin brother Emil, 1904

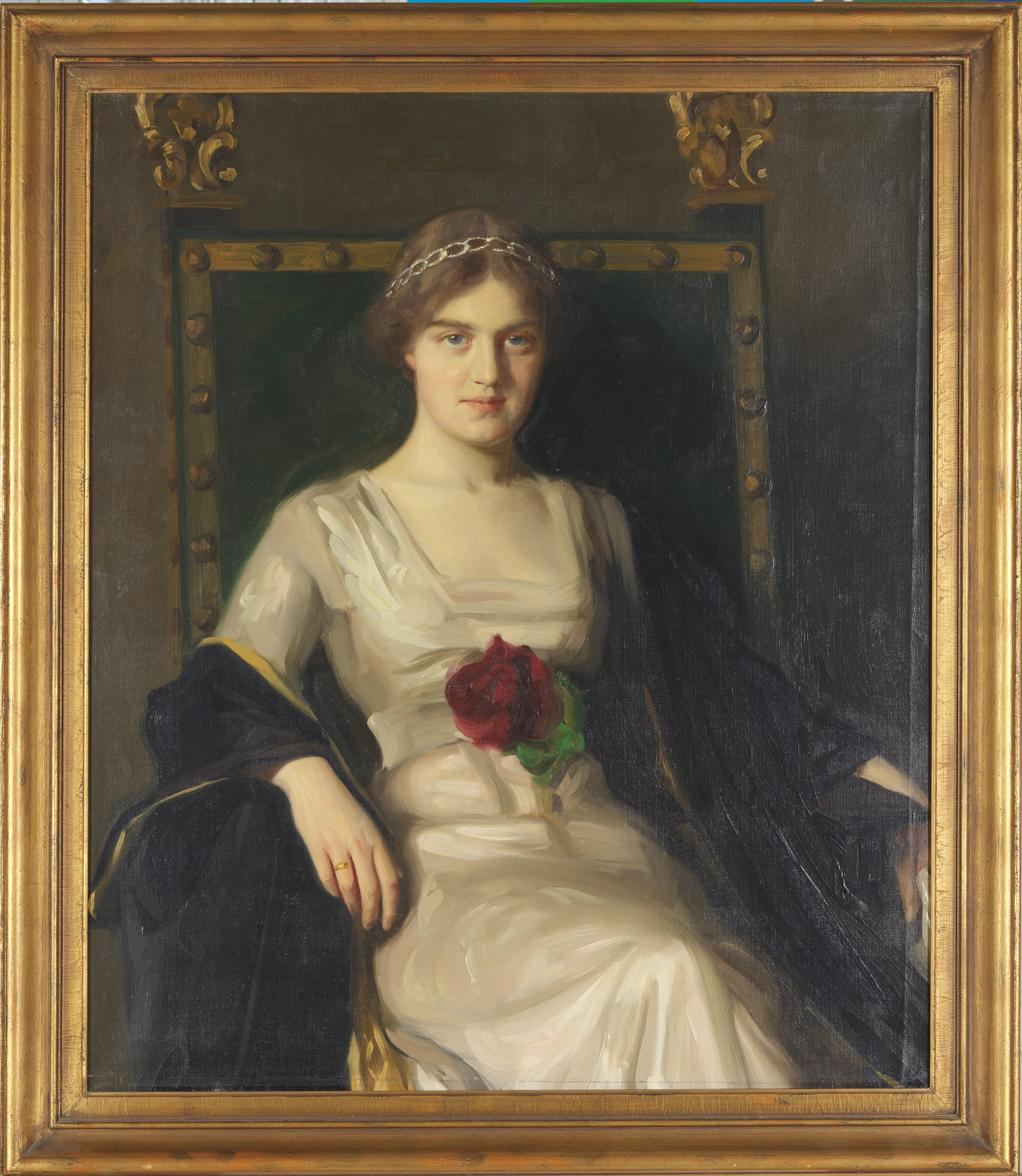
Grand Duchess Maria Pavlovna of Russia

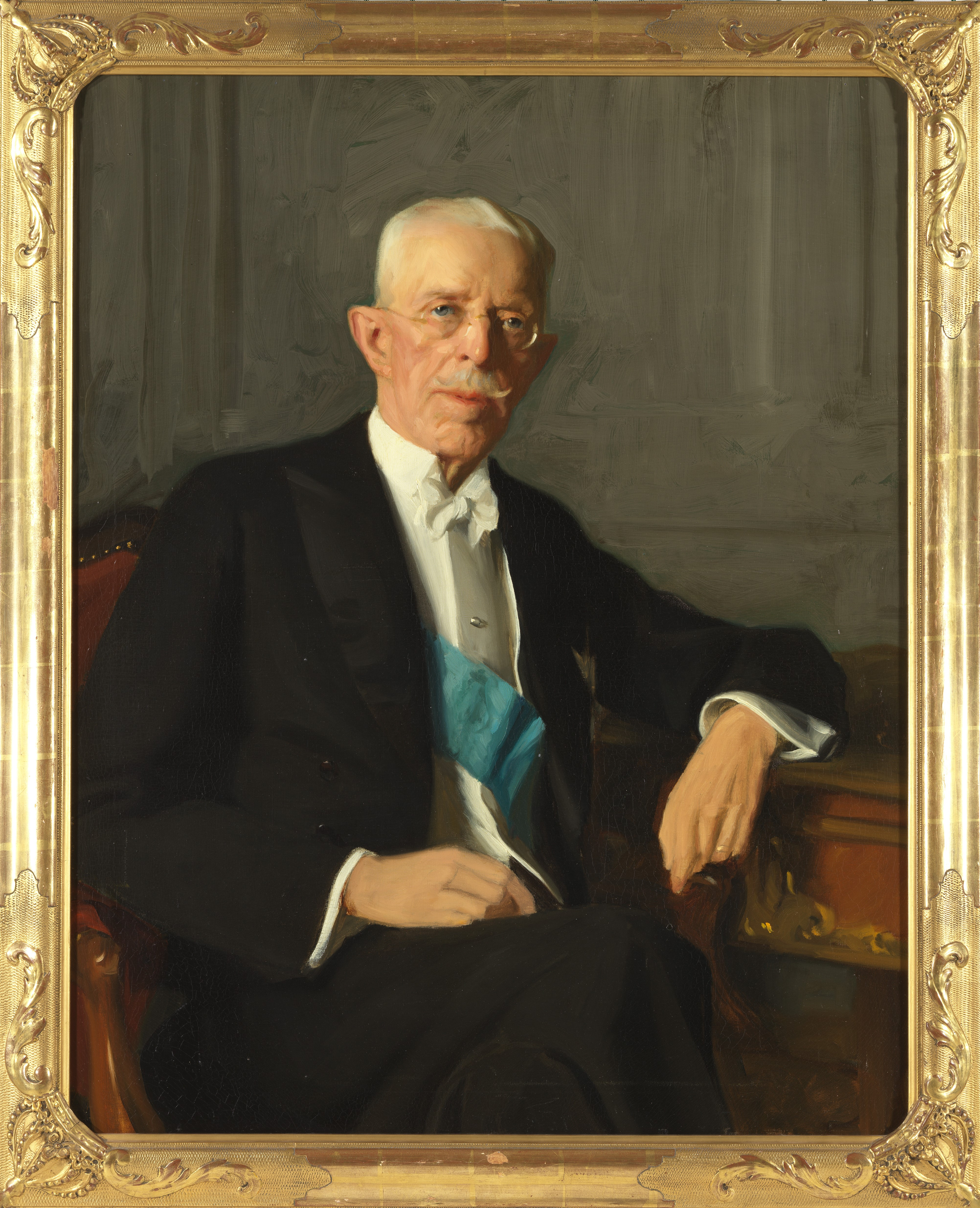
Gustav V, one of his
last paintings

== Other sources ==
- "Österman, Bernhard".
- Svenskt konstnärslexikon Part V, pgs. 820–821, Allhems Förlag, Malmö
