= Innovative Concepts in Entertainment =

American arcade manufacturer

Innovative Concepts in Entertainment, Inc.
- Type: Private
- Industry: Game machine manufacturing
- Founded: 1982
- Founder: Ralph Coppola
- Headquarters: Clarence, New York, United States
- Area served: 70+ countries
- Key people: Joe Coppola (President), Daniel Coppola (Vice President)
- Products: The Flintstones, Ice Cold Beer, Hungry Hungry Hippos, Real Steel, Super Chexx
- Net income: 10-20 million USD
- Number of employees: 143
- Website: www.icegame.com

Innovative Concepts in Entertainment, Inc., abbreviated as ICE, is an American electronic game and redemption game manufacturer based in Clarence, New York, United States. The company was founded in 1982 and has since become the leader of the North American market. The company was previously owned by MidMark Capital and Summer Street Capital Partners, but was sold back to the original owners in June 2008. Alongside redemption games, the company manufactures claw games and pinball.

== History ==
Innovative Concepts in Entertainment was founded in 1982 by Ralph Coppola. In 1982, the company created Chexx, which thrust them into popularity. They would continue to produce redemption games, and later produce the game Cyclone in 1995, which became even more successful. The success of Cyclone and the tactics in its design would greatly change the redemption game industry. Its design would be replicated and tactics copied. In the 1990's, ICE expanded to the crane game market, and by the mid-1990's became a leader in the industry as it rebounded in popularity.

During the COVID-19 pandemic, the company struggled to stay afloat due to New York's lockdown laws. However, they survived by creating a new website appealing to men trying to create a man cave.
