= Edwall (surname) =

Edwall is a Swedish surname. Notable people with the surname include:

- Allan Edwall (1924–1997), Swedish actor, director, author, composer, and singer
- Britt Edwall (1935–2025), Swedish television and radio presenter and author
- Stefan Edwall (born 1971), Swedish table hockey player
