= Super Chexx =

Table hockey arcade game

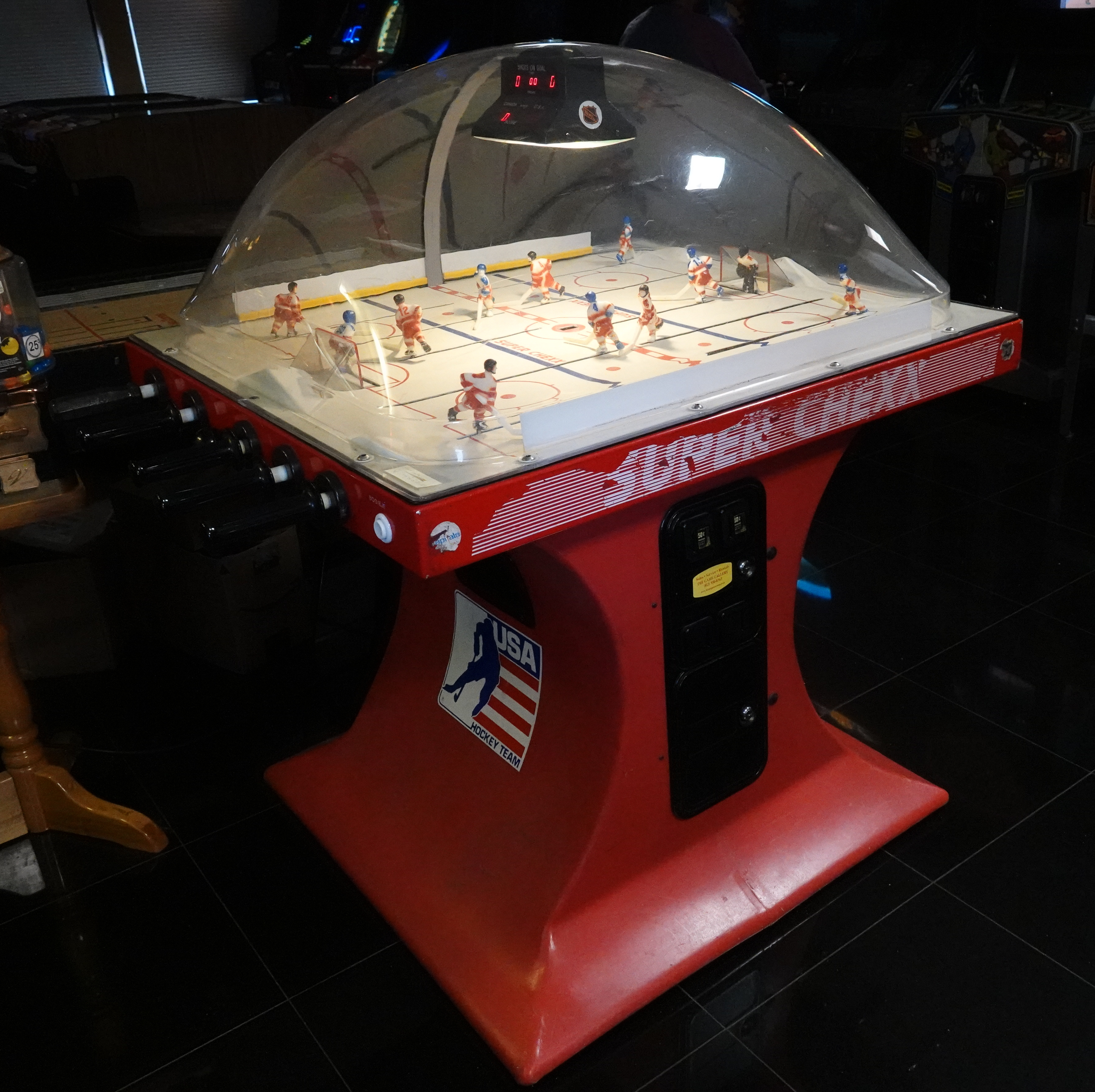
Super Chexx Canada vs. USA variant. Photographed at Billy's Midway Arcade in 2025.

Super Chexx® is a table hockey arcade game manufactured by Innovative Concepts in Entertainment Inc. (ICE) from 1988 to 2017.

== Game play ==
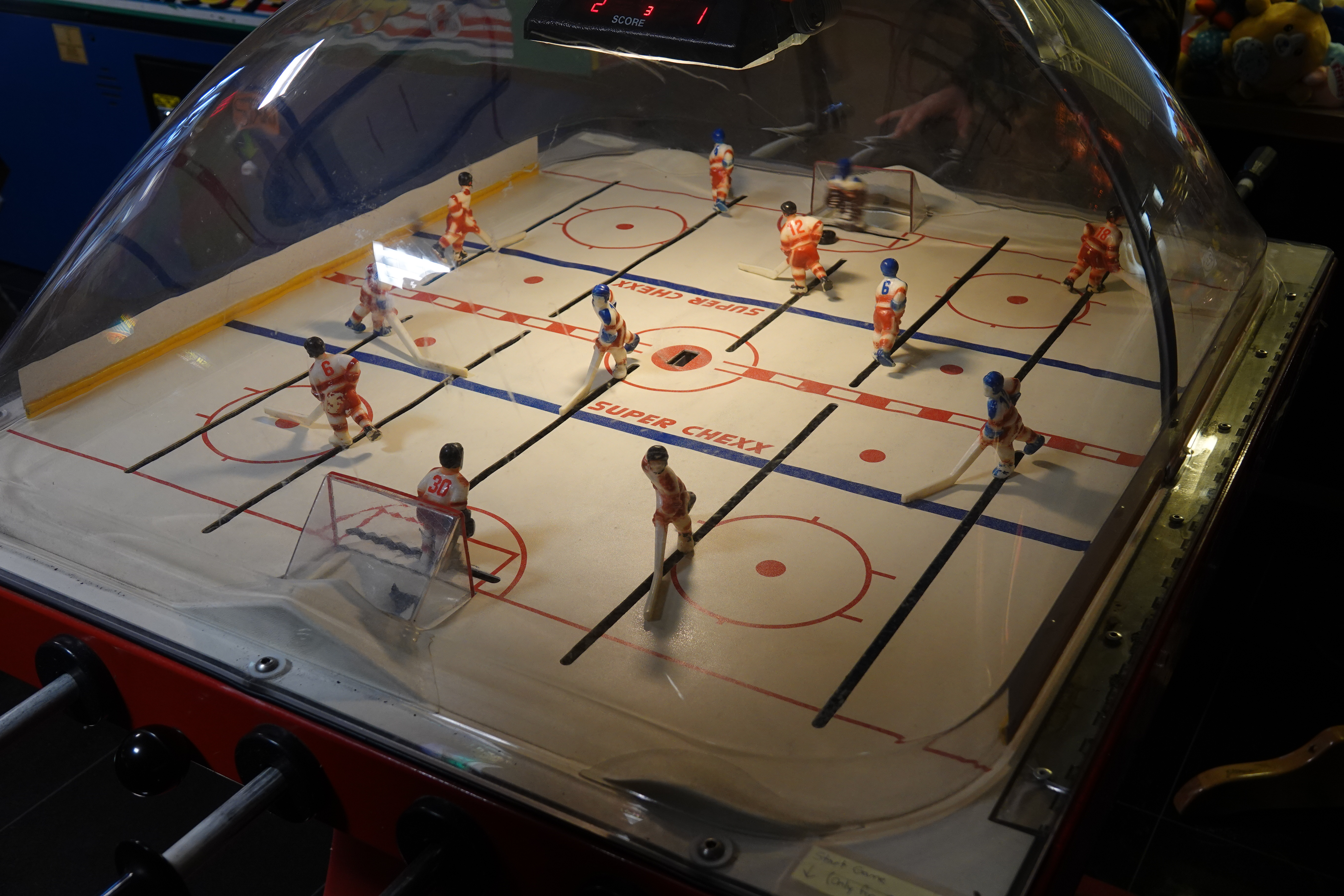
Close up of the playing field of Super Chexx mid-game. If the USA Goalie isn't careful, Canada will score very soon.

The game can be played by two opposing players who control all five hockey players and the goalie for their side (singles) or as a two on two game (doubles). Players control their five skaters with long rods that move in and out to bring skaters up and down the ice and spin 360 degrees. A knob is used to move the goalie from side to side. Like regular ice hockey, goals are scored when one player is able to shoot the puck into the opponent's goal.

Each player also has a "boo button" to simulate sounds from the crowd. Public address announcements (goals scored and the beginning and ending of each period) feature recordings of Rick Jeanneret, the longtime play-by-play announcer for the Buffalo Sabres.

== History ==
ICE began manufacturing CHEXX bubble hockey in 1982 and it quickly became one of the top-earning bar and arcade games of the 1980s. Enhancements to the game were added and it was renamed Super Chexx in 1988 and it continued to be popular in bars and arcades and received national acclaim during the Bud Light Bubble Boys tournament series from 1999 to 2001. In November 2017 Super Chexx was replaced with the Super Chexx Pro edition using enhanced electronics featuring a 5" LCD jumbotron and LED lighting. Super Chexx Pro is still made in the US in Clarence, New York just outside Buffalo. These types of games are also known as bubble hockey, rod hockey, table hockey or dome hockey because of the long rods used to control the players and the distinctive dome or "bubble" covering the playing field.

Vintage versions of Super Chexx feature the USA vs. Russia, Canada vs. Russia, or USA vs. Canada formats. In 2010 ICE introduced a Deluxe Home version of the game with no coin doors and started offering NHL and AHL licensed team versions. There is also a 30th Anniversary "Miracle on Ice" Edition of the game featuring the classic USA vs CCCP teams licensed through USA Hockey. Licensed games feature team colors and logos with custom hand-painted players in replica jerseys.

The early versions of the game were made with blue bases, but most of the games are now made with red bases. The first black bases were made for a Bubble Boys Tournament with Wayne Gretzky and Bud Light in 1999. There was a limited edition of 100 games with black bases made in 2005. A further limited edition with the black base was made in 2007. The home version of the game has a base which can be split and hinged to fit through narrow doorways and comes in red or black.
