= Snow racer =

Nordic winter toy

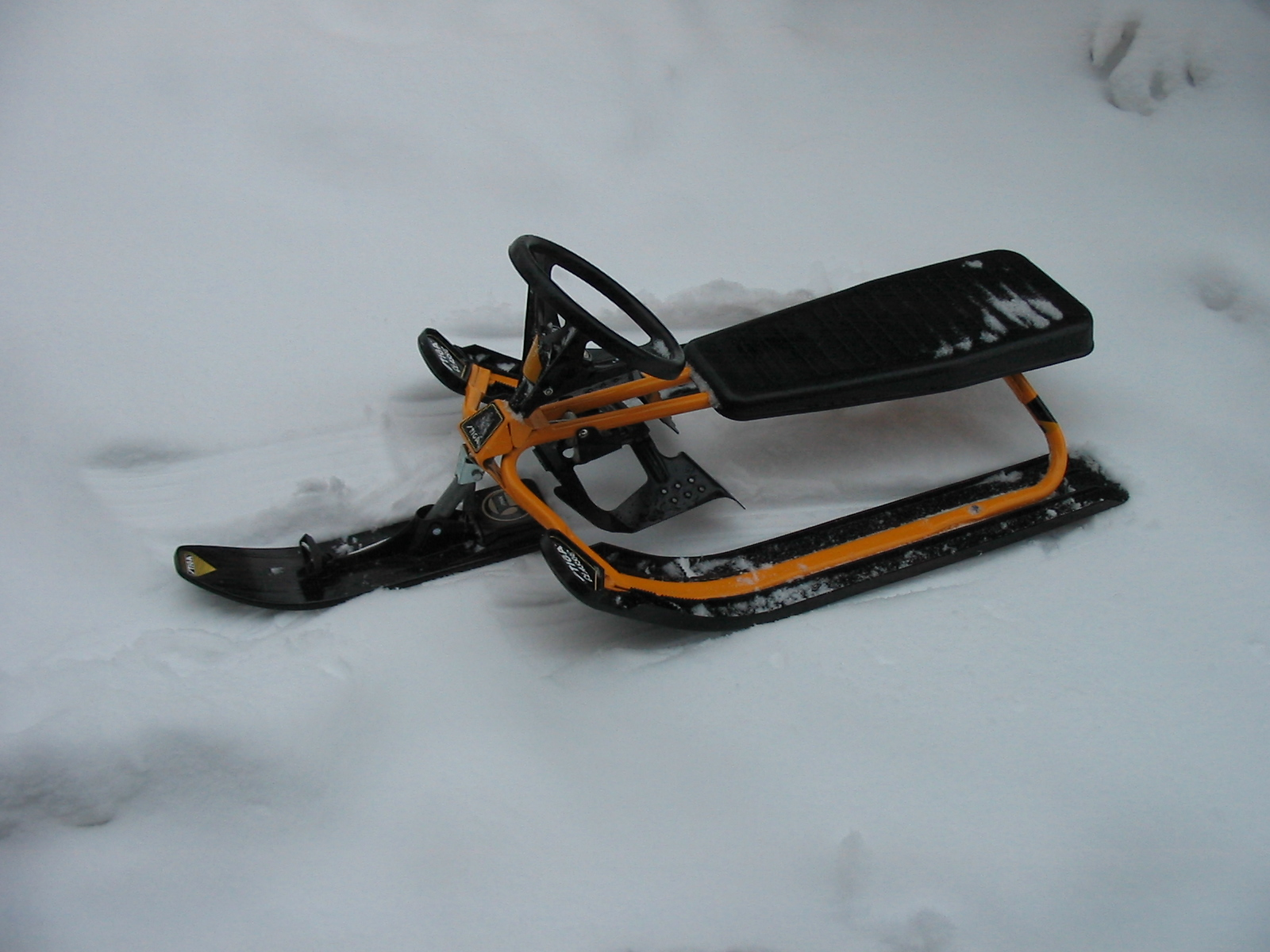
Stiga snowracer

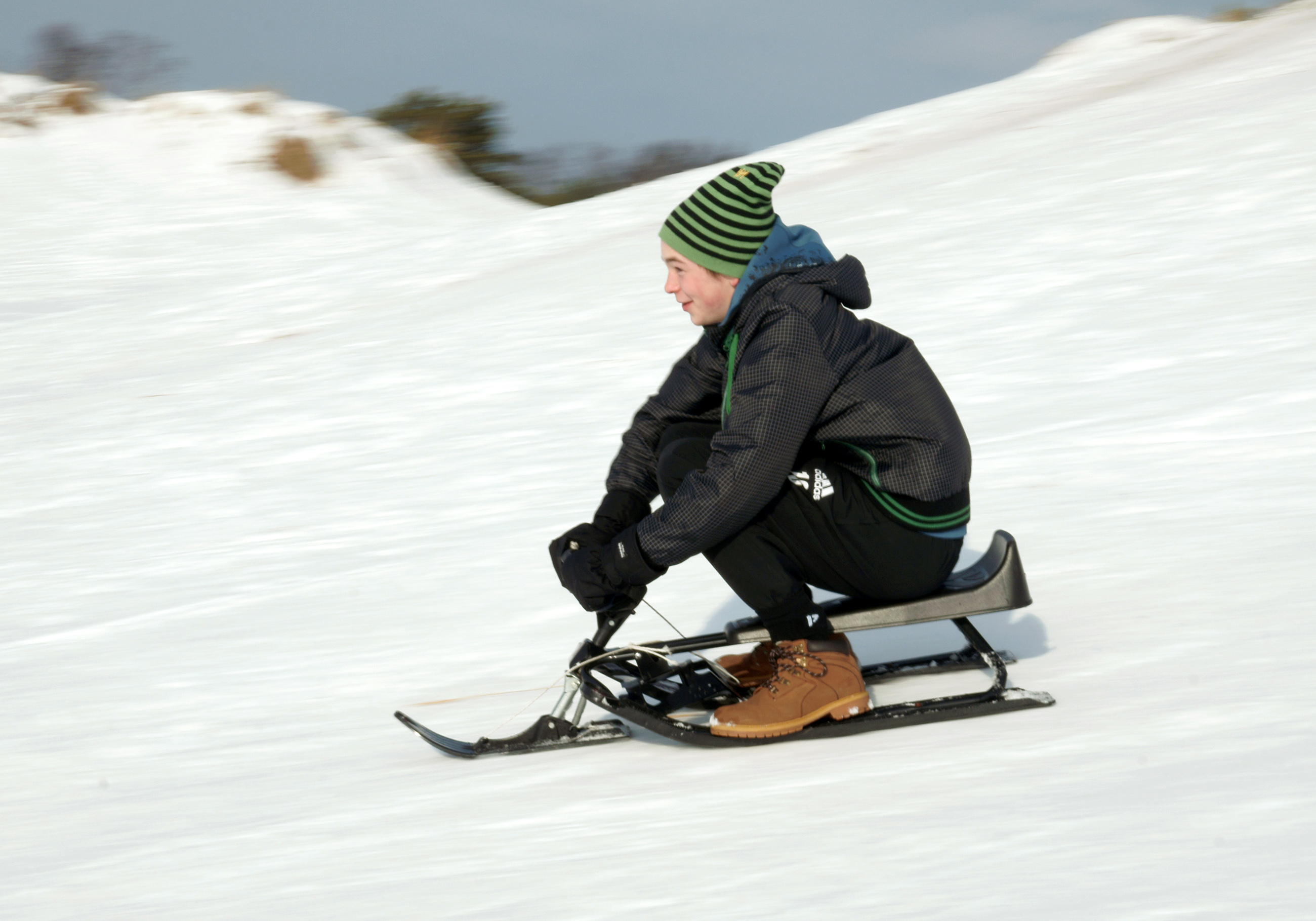
Sledding with a snow racer

A snow racer (also spelt snowracer, originally a 1965 Stiga brandname), or steering sled (cf. Swedish: styrkälke; or rattkälke, Finnish: rattikelkka, "steering wheel sled"), is a Nordic winter toy used in snowy winter recreation, consisting of a small sled with a raised seat, runners, and steering wheel for a central steering ski.

In Sweden and Finland, the toy falls under a multitude of regional names, which has led linguists to conduct investigations into which names exist and where they are used and when in time they belong.

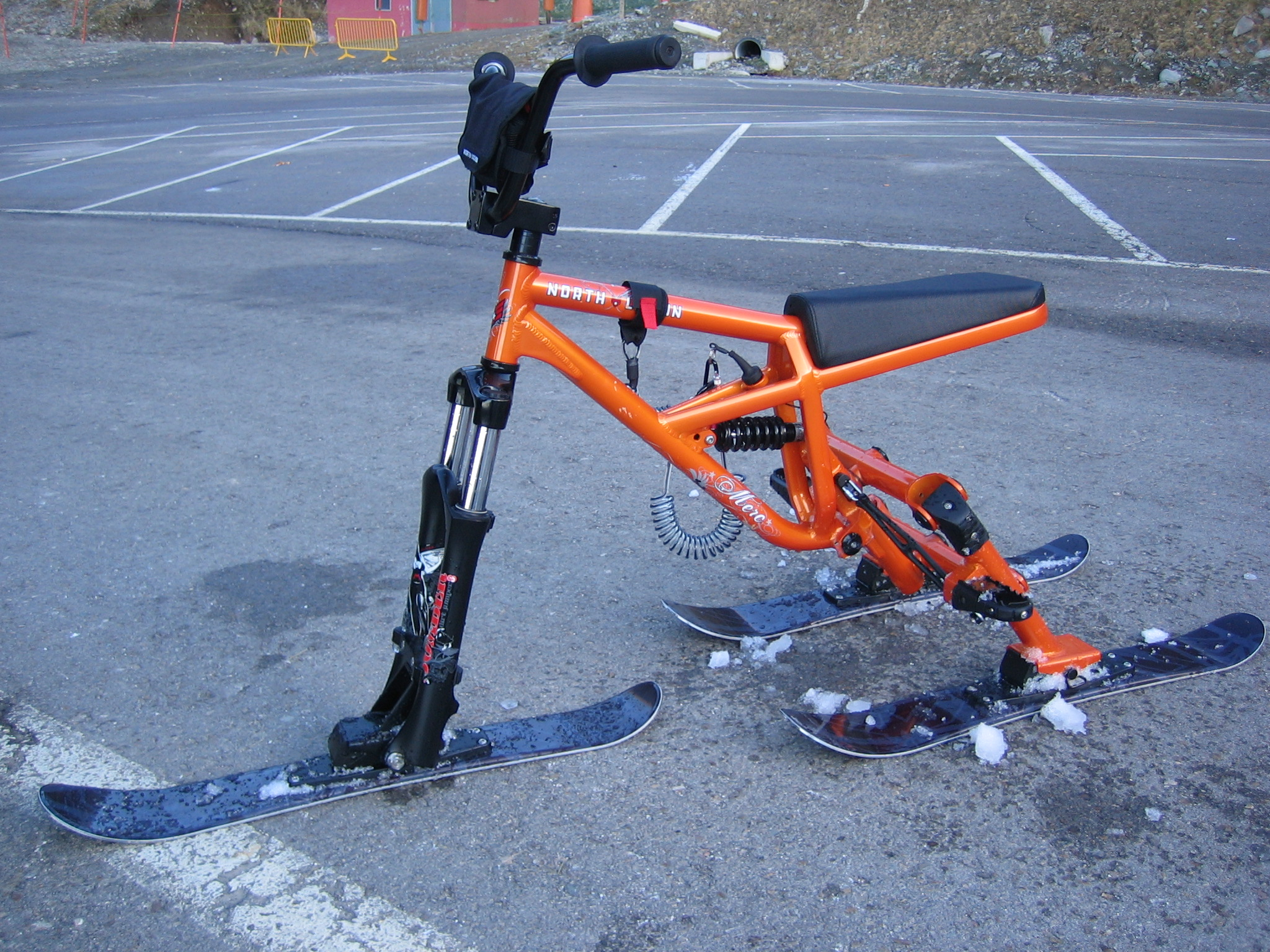
SMX snow racer

A larger, more bike-like design was launched by Norwegian company North Legion in 2005, called the SMX.

== Se also ==
- Flexible Flyer
