= FIH Hockey5s World Cup =

FIH Hockey5s World Cup may refer to:

- FIH Men's Hockey5s World Cup
- FIH Women's Hockey5s World Cup
