= Stiga =

Garden tool and sporting goods brand

Stiga logo

Stiga Group (formerly GGP Spa) is a European manufacturer and distributor of lawnmowers and a wide range of motorized garden tools. It is headquartered in Castelfranco Veneto, Italy. Stiga has 13 subsidiaries in Europe (Austria, Italy, Benelux, Czech Republic, Denmark, Finland, France, Germany, Norway, Poland, Sweden, UK). Stiga distributes and sells its products in over 70 countries around the world.

Stiga was originally a Swedish brand known for the production and distribution of lawnmowers, a wide range of motorized garden tools, snow racers (a kind of toy sled with a raised seat, runners and steering wheel), table tennis products and table hockey games. In the year 2000, Stiga was acquired by Castelgarden SpA via a merger with Alpina Professional & Garden SpA, both located in Italy. The company's expansion in Europe continued with the acquisition of the British firm Mountfield. Together they formed Global Garden Products (GGP) Group and 2017 it was renamed to Stiga Group.

== Stiga Sports ==
The brand Stiga is today used by the Swedish company Stiga Sports for the production of sports products, including table tennis, snowriders and table hockey. Stiga started the production of table tennis products in 1938 and the production of hockey games in 1944. The production of table is now operated under the brand "Stiga Sport", and it has been manufacturing tennis products since 1944. It started the production of table hockey games in 1957 and it was a huge success. The company started the production of lawnmowers in 1958.

Bengt Bandstigen founded the table tennis company Banda in 1966, which later became Stiga Sports AB. In 1983, the company begun to sell Stiga table tennis products and year 2006 it acquired the Stiga Games division to the company.

== History ==
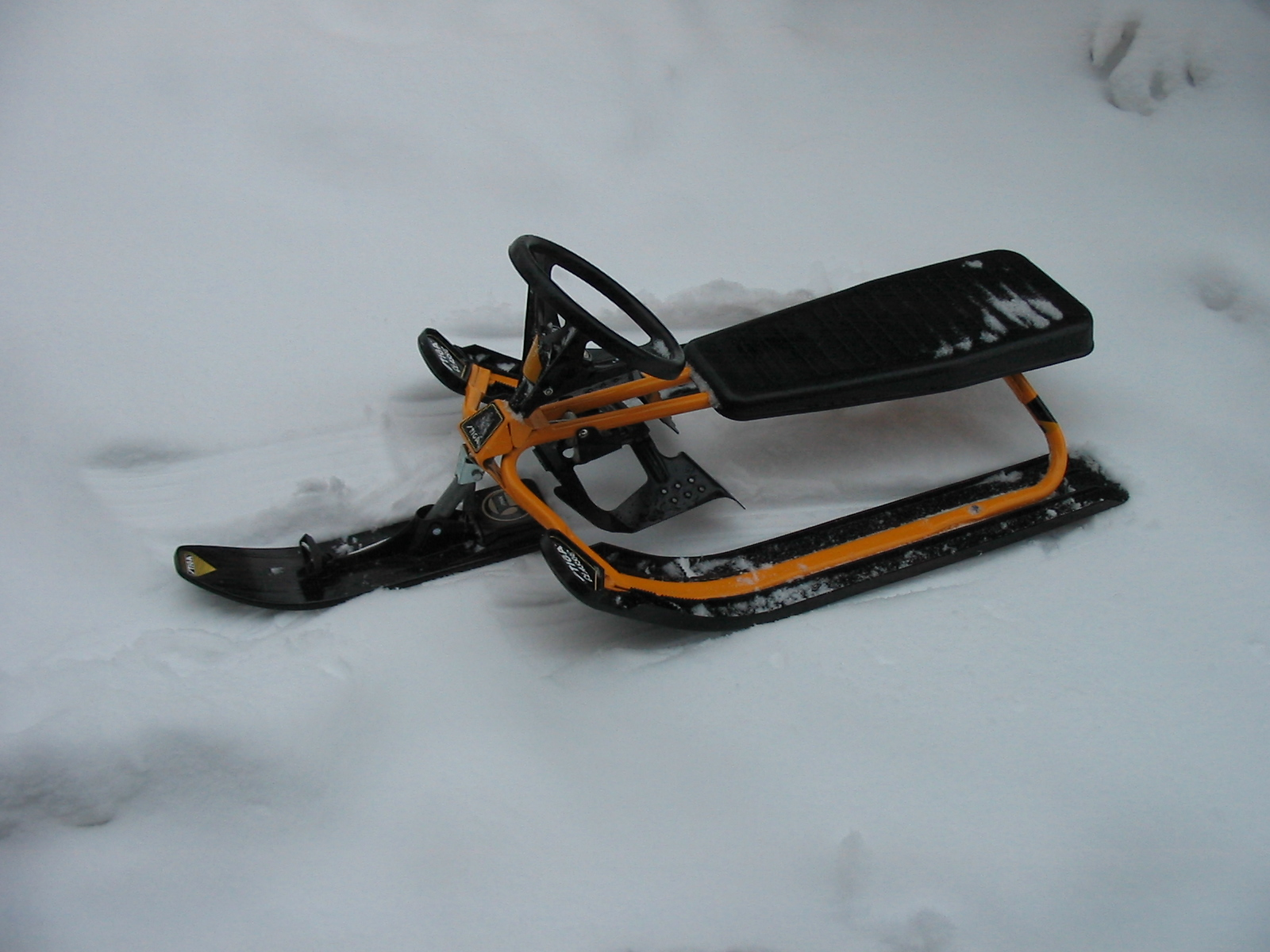
stiga snow racer

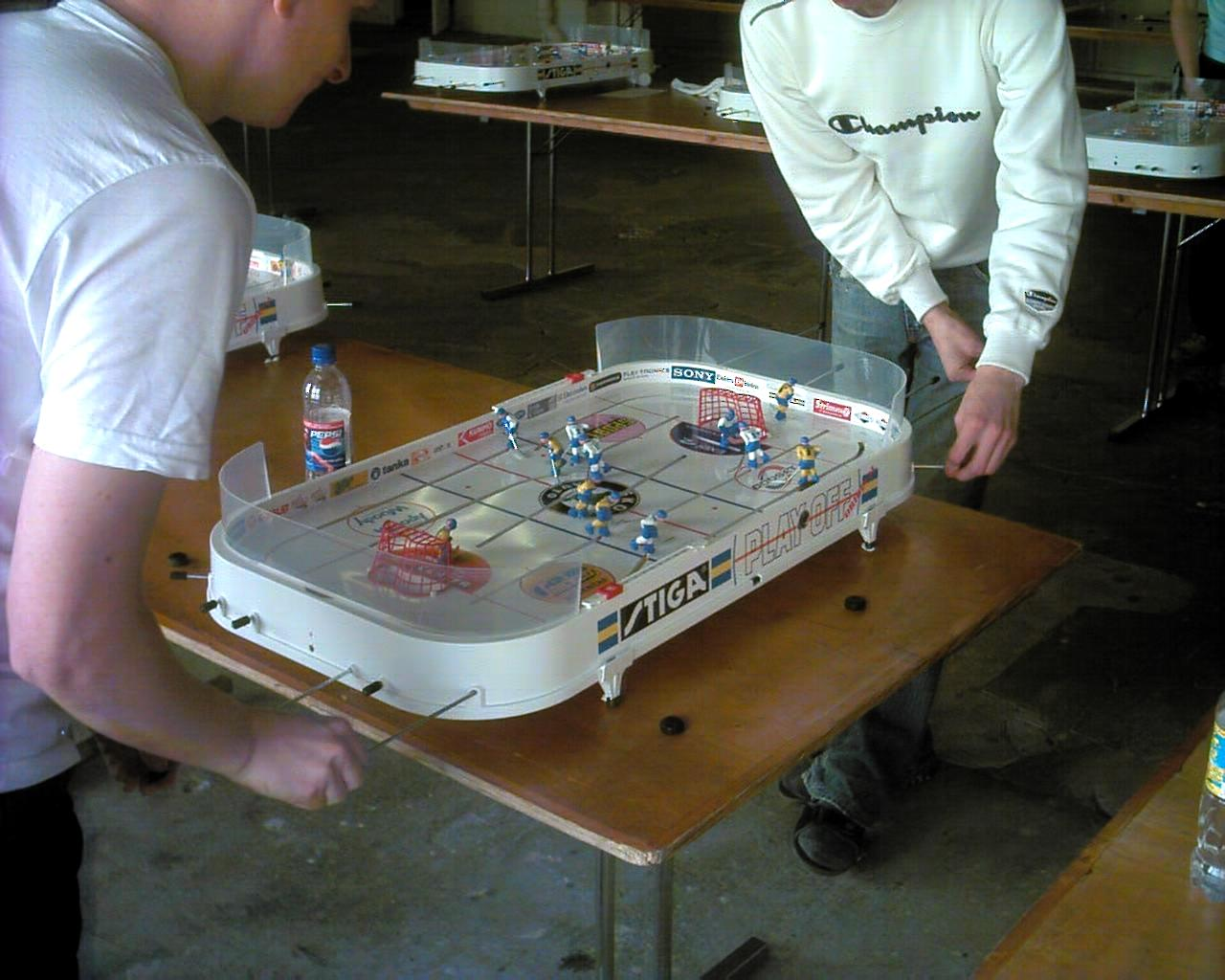
stiga Table hockey

- 6 March 1934, Stig Hjelmquist founded in Tranås the company Firma Fabriksprodukter, that will later become Stiga.
- 1938 Production of the first articles that would make Stiga world-famous: the table tennis products.
- 1938 The new company name Stigma, later on changed to Stiga, was founded.
- 1943 Stiga started to produce equipment for table tennis under their own management. Mainly it was so called complete games with rackets, net, attachment system and ball.
- 1949 Sees a change of name from Stigma to Stiga.
- 1957 Production of the first table hockey game.
- 1971 Stiga was established abroad and sales offices in London and Helsinki were opened.
- 1976 (4 June) King Carl XVI Gustaf inaugurated Stiga's new factory of 18 000 m^{2}, and with its total of 34,000m^{2} becoming, at the time, the largest factory in the Nordic countries for the manufacturing of motor driven lawn mowers.
- 1981 The company is reorganized to better reflect Stiga's operations, creating three divisions: Sports, Gun and Garden.
- 1994 Stiga celebrates its 60th anniversary.
- 1997 Stiga has representation in around 40 countries, including in New Zealand, North America, South America and Eastern Europe.
