= ITHF table hockey =

Table-top game simulating ice hockey

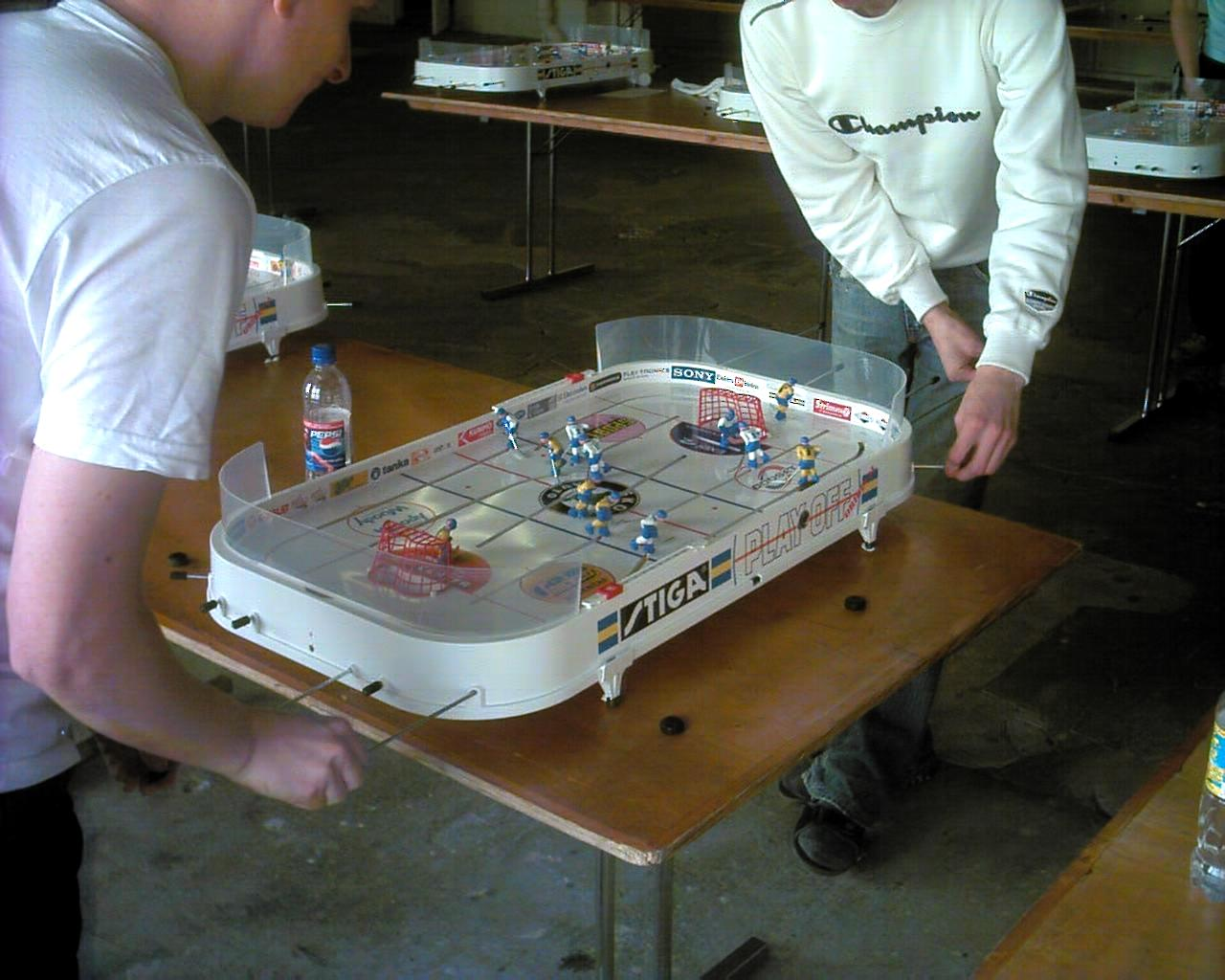
Table hockey being played

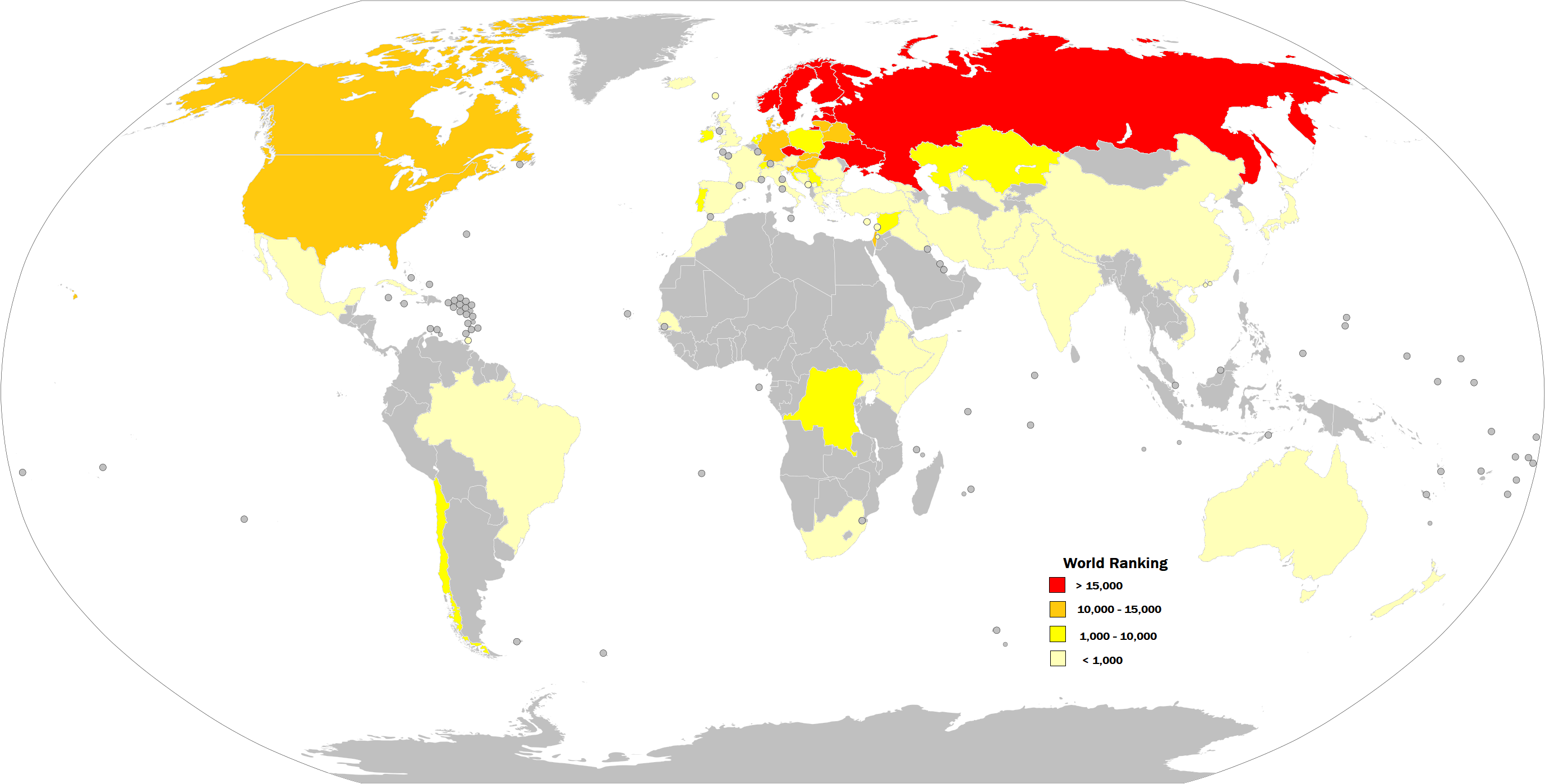
Countries with at least one table hockey player in ITHF World ranking. In red are Top 8 countries. 15000+ points 10000+ points 1000+ points -1000 points up-to-date: 20 July 2019

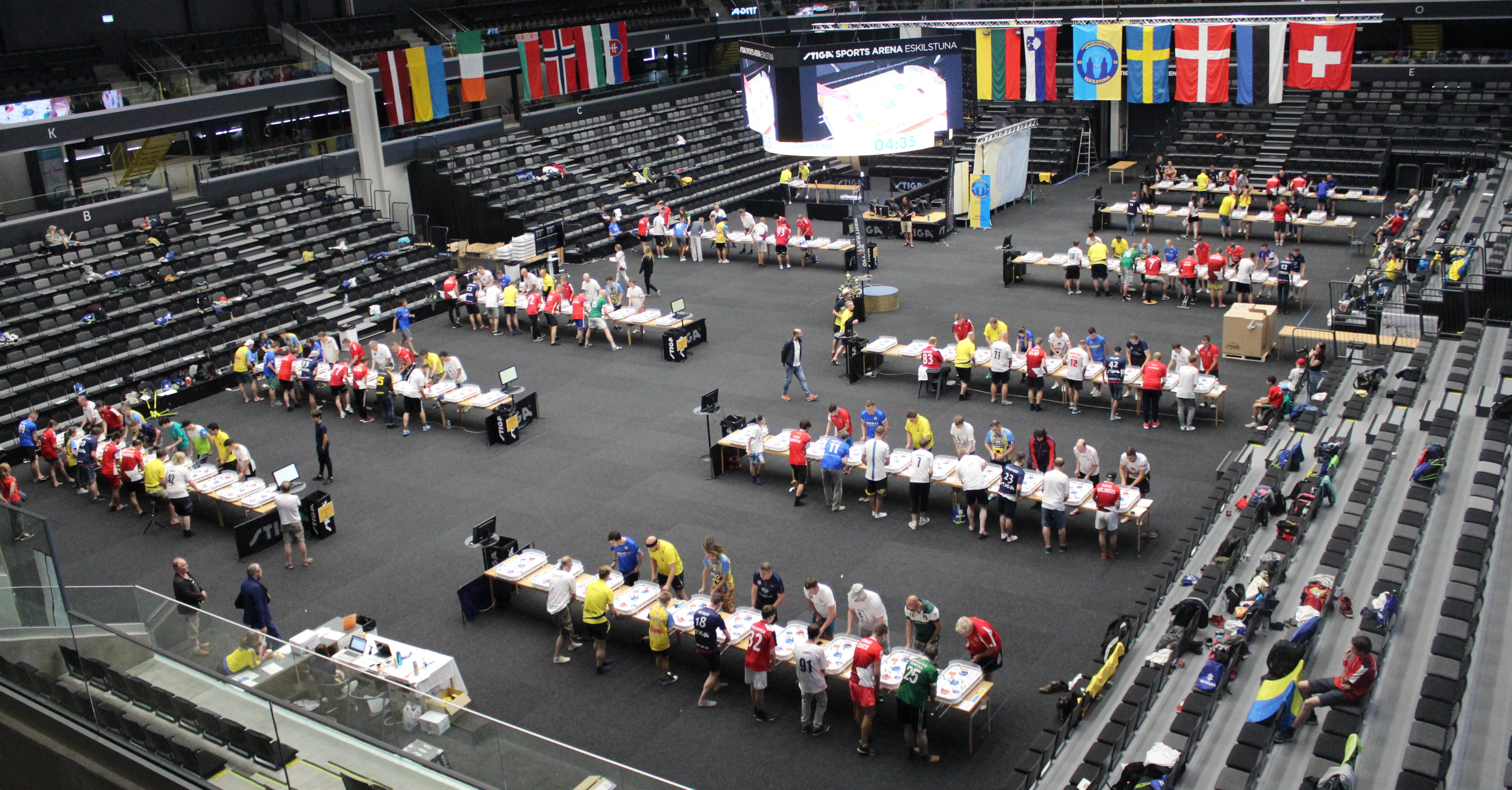
European Table Hockey Championship in Eskilstuna (SE), 2018

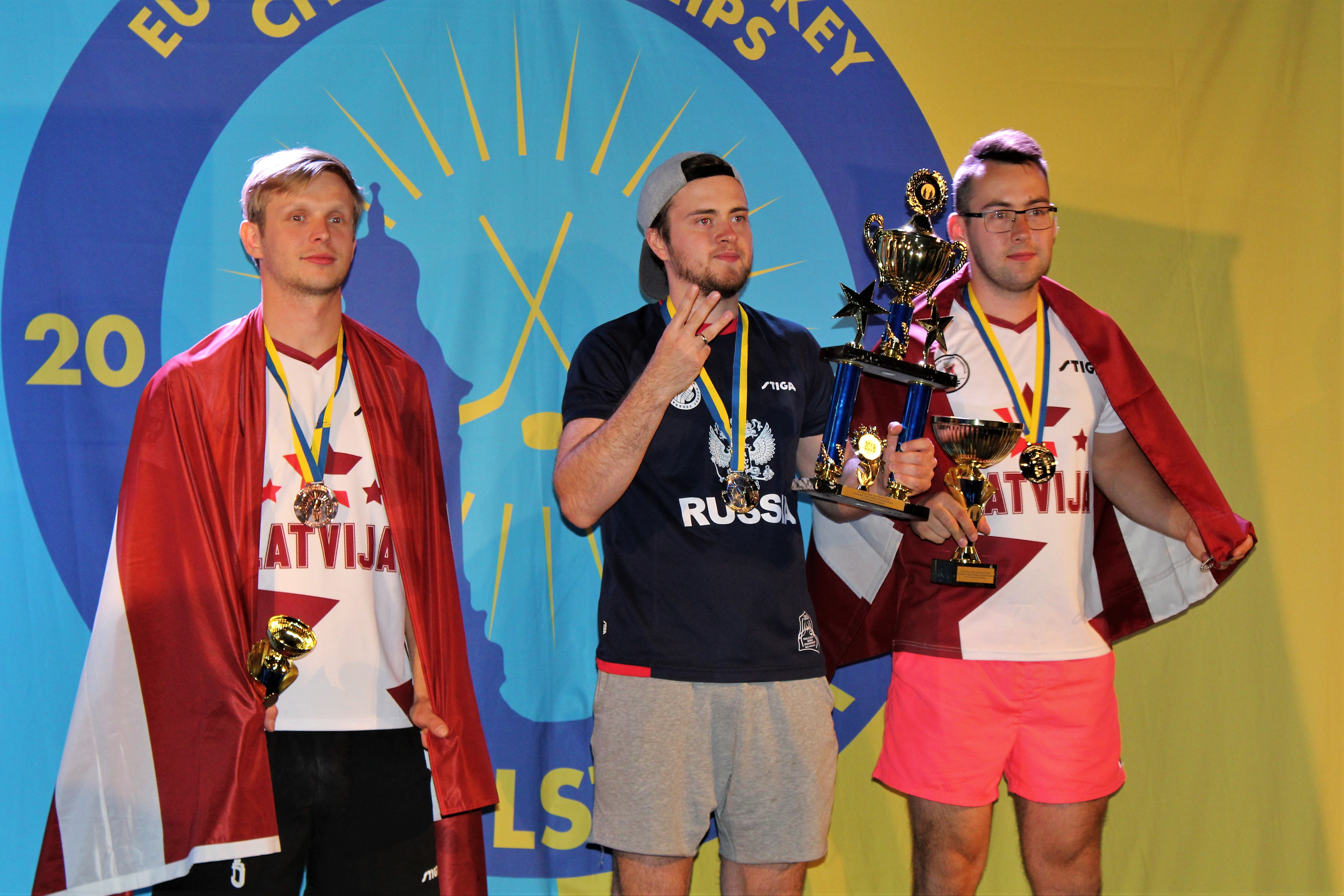
Maksim Borisov (RU), in centre - at awarding after his third winning of European Championship. Left from Borisov - Atis Sīlis (3. place), right - Edgars Caics (2. place), both from Latvia

ITHF table hockey is a sport played on table hockey games. The International Table Hockey Federation (ITHF) is an organization that oversees these competitions. The sport originates in the Swedish Championship 1982 in Upplands Väsby. Organized table hockey is played in northern and eastern parts of Europe, North America, South America, Africa, Australia, and Asia.

The World Championship is organized by the ITHF every two years. The models, produced by Stiga, are the official game for competitions.

Sweden has dominated the table hockey scene from the beginning and a couple of years into the new millennium. Until the Finnish gold in Riga 2005, Sweden had won all Team World Championships, until 2006 only Swedes had won the Open Swedish Masters, and until 2007 all individual world champions were Swedes. But the new generation of players comes from Finland, Russia, Ukraine, Czech Republic, Latvia, Canada, Denmark, the United States, Estonia, Kazakhstan, Switzerland, Norway, Slovenia, Hungary, Slovakia and Lithuania, and its current world champion, as of 2023 is Evgeniy Matantsev from Ukraine. From December 2013 until 2021, Maxim Borisov from Russia had been ranked #1 in the world. In the 2023 World Team Championships Latvia was the winner.

Since the sport expands quickly in many countries, the table hockey map may have to be redrawn within a couple of years when nations other than the big eight (Sweden, Finland, Russia, Czech Republic, Norway, Estonia, Latvia and Ukraine) produce new talents.

== History ==
First table hockey games were made during the 1930s in Sweden and Canada. Naturally there was no plastic, so they were made from sheet metal.

The use of plastic brought an expansion of table hockey. The Swedish company Stiga started to make hockey tables in the late 1950s. Thanks to the enthusiasm of Swedish players, table hockey expanded to the rest of the world.

Big worldwide development arrived in the late 1990s. That led to an idea founding an international federation. ITHF was established during the World Championship 2005 in Riga, Latvia. Now it associates 21 national federations.

Table hockey is most popular in countries and regions where ice hockey is traditionally played, including Scandinavia, Central and Eastern Europe, and North America. However, the ITHF notes that it is gaining in popularity outside of these traditional regions.

== Game rules ==
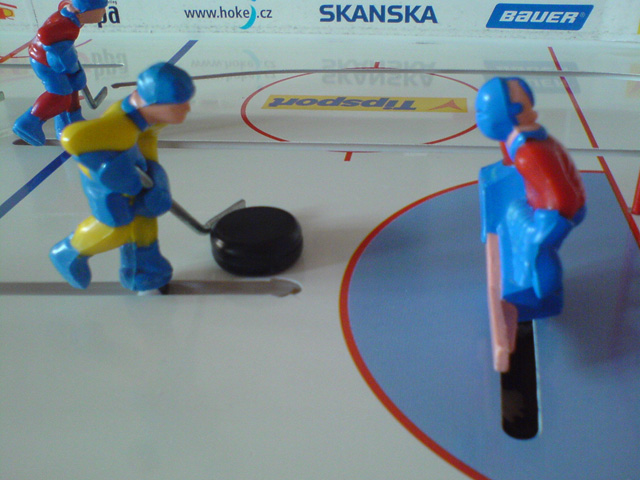
A player figure with puck.

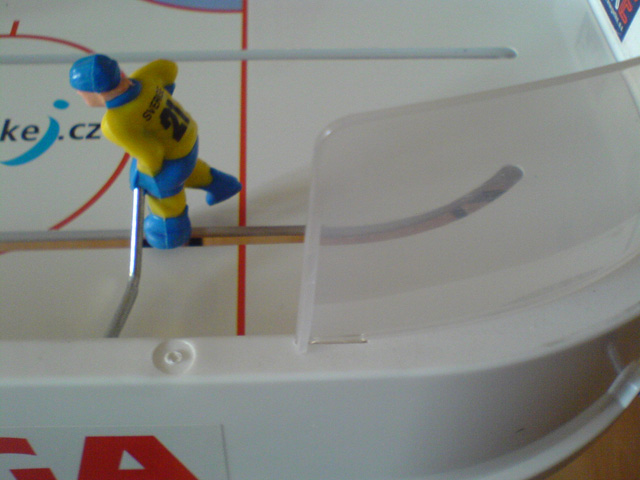
A plastic glass, which helps to keep the puck in play. It is attached to the table behind the goal.

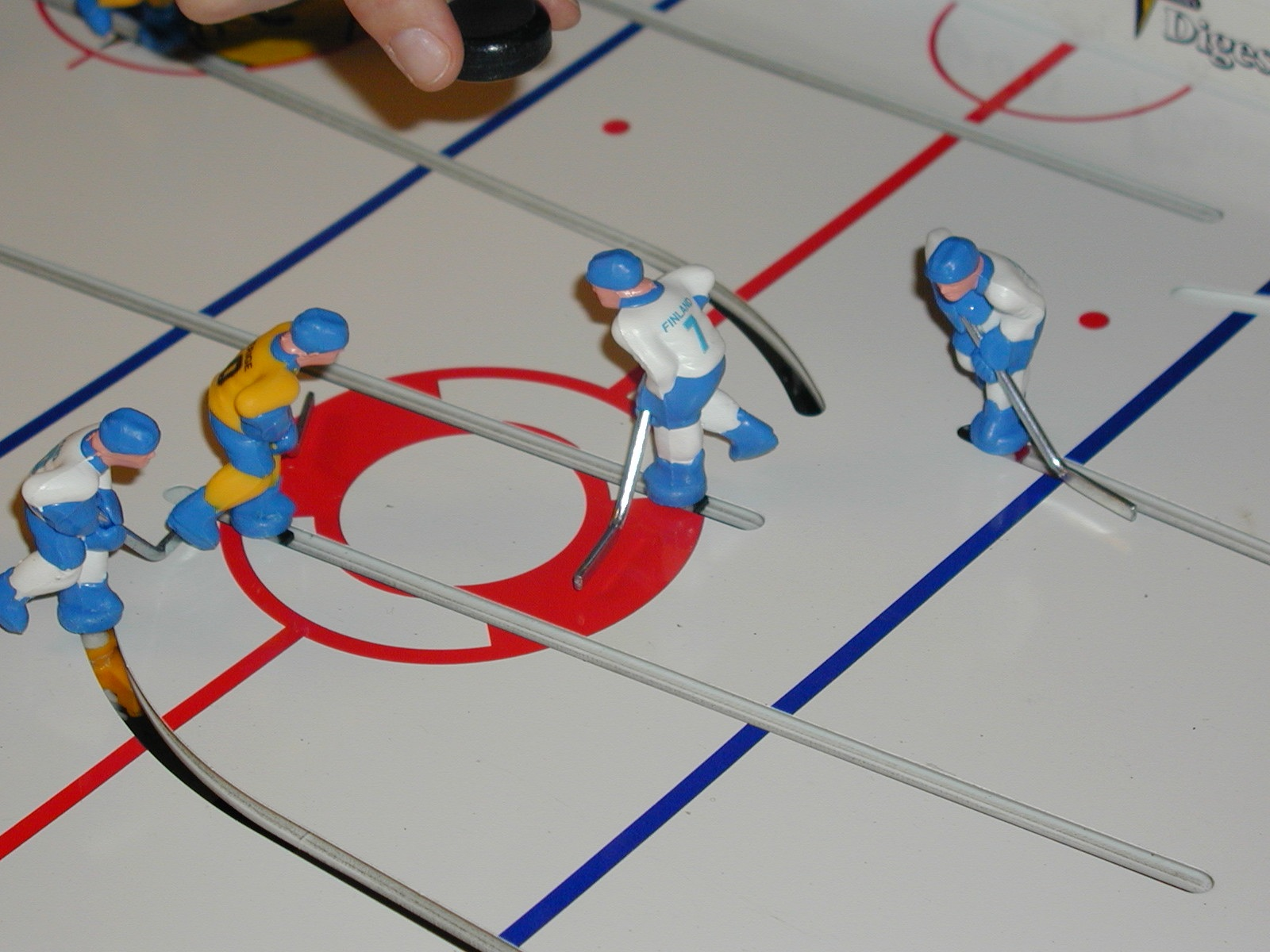
Table hockey face-off

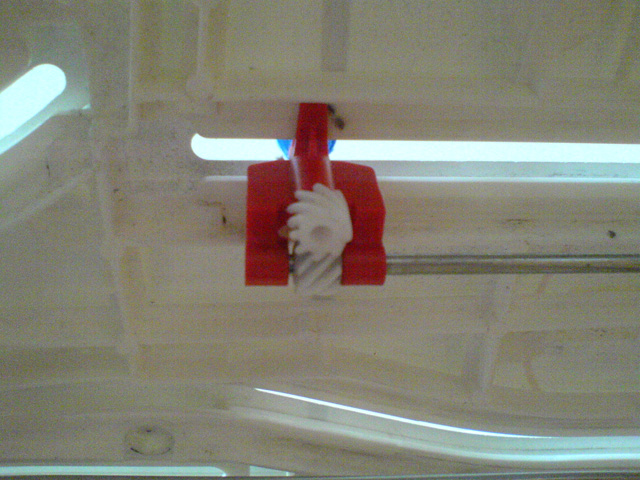
Table hockey mechanics of player movement.

These are the most important rules. Whole rules.

=== Game model and preparation ===
- Stiga games must be used.
- Goal cups must be removed.
- Games must be fastened to the table.
- The speed of the game's surface must be kept the same as the usual factory surface speed.

=== Playing figures ===
- Figures from the Stiga Play-off versions (all figures have the stick on the same side) of Stiga table hockey games must be used.

=== Matches ===
- Matches last five minutes.
- Time runs even if the puck is out of play.
- An audio timer should be used for all matches.
- If any player retires during a match when the opponent insists on continuing, he/she automatically loses all his/her goals scored during the game, while the opponent may add an extra five goals to his/her score.
- During the play-off matches, in the event of a draw at the end of the five minutes, there is an overtime. The overtime starts with a new face-off. The winner is the one who scores the first goal (sudden death).

=== Face-offs ===
- All matches begin with the puck placed at centre spot. Game starts with the opening signal. If any player plays the puck before the signal, face-off is made.
- Face-offs are made by dropping the puck on the centre spot.

Centre forwards and left defenders must stay on their own side of the centre red line during a face-off.

- Players must be sure that their opponent is ready before releasing the puck. If the face-off is made wrong the opponent is allowed to ask for a new one or he/she may make a new face-off by himself/herself. If a player makes a lot of bad drops in a play-off match, the opponent can ask for a neutral dropper.
- Three seconds must elapse after each face-off before a valid goal can be scored. This rule is in effect even if a neutral person is making the face-off.
- The puck must hit the sideboards, or a playing figure other than the center must gain control of the puck before a goal can be counted.

=== Scoring ===
- The puck must stay in the goal cage for the goal to count. In and outs do not count. If the puck goes out from the goal cage, the match continues without interruption
- If any player wants to interrupt the game in order to avoid the goal heading into his cage, he must clearly say a short phrase. The game is interrupted and puck placed in the middle of the board for the next face off. The phrase could only be said if the player keeps the puck long enough to enable his opponent to say it.
- The puck must be removed from the puck catcher (if there is any) before the next face off.
- A goal scored directly by pressing a motionless puck against the goal cage or against the goalie does not count. A goal scored in this way indirectly (off the bank or off another figure) counts.
- If a goal is scored when the final buzzer is sounding, the goal is not valid.
- If any figure or goalie breaks when a goal is scored, the goal is valid.
- A goal scored by moving the whole game is not valid.

=== Goal crease rule ===
- If the puck is in full rest in goal crease and is touching the goal line the defending player may call "block" and a new face-off is made.
- If the puck is in full rest in goal crease and is not touching the goal line the defending player must play the puck.

=== Possession rule ===
- It is not permitted to retain possession of the puck without making any recognizable attempt to score a goal. This is regarded as passive play.
- If the puck is kept in possession by one figure without passing or shooting, a warning can be given by the opponent after five (5) seconds has elapsed since the figure gained puck control.

=== Interference ===
- A player can tap down his/her figures only when he/she has complete possession of the puck.
- If a player scores a goal while the opponent is tapping his/her figures, the goal counts.
- Rough playing that results in shaking of the game and causing the puck to move is forbidden.
- If any figure loses possession of the puck due to shaking of the game, then the puck must be returned to this figure.

=== Interruption ===
- If any unusual situation happens (e.g. broken gear, rod or game, displaced goal cage, lights go out, several pucks appear on the game or somebody/something interrupts any of the opponents), the match must be immediately suspended. A player can interrupt the game by saying "stop" if the opponent is not aware of such situation. The match resumes when both players are ready again.
- If a match is interrupted and significant time is lost then the lost time must be added to remaining time and the match continues.
- If a player had indisputable control of the puck before the interruption, the match continues with the puck in the place where it was, otherwise a new face-off is made.

== World Table Hockey Tour ==
In 2003/04, the first worldwide league, EuroLeague (EL), was created. 6 tournaments formed the league, The tournaments were Helsinki Open, Oslo Open, Riga Cup, Swedish Masters, Moscow Open and Czech Open.

The league has changed name to World Table Hockey Tour (WT), and consists every year of around 15 tournaments. The original 6 tournaments (B6) were still regarded as the most important tournaments, and were called the Big Six tournaments. These tournaments were later renamed to SuperSeries, and in the 2021/2022 season there were 6 SuperSeries tournaments (in Slovenia, Latvia, Sweden, Estonia, Czech Republic and Russia).

== ITHF World ranking ==
The World ranking table sorts players by their actual rank points. The ranking is sum of player's best results in last two years. Points, which player gets for participating in any reported tournament are counted on the basis of: level of the tournament, number of players beaten and world ranking of players beaten. A winner of the World Championship always gets 1010 points and a winner of Europe Championship or North America Championship gets at least 610 points. World ranking with a reduced coefficient calculated points to six years. There are more than 8 000 players from more than 50 countries and five continents in the world ranking, organized through over 400 clubs.

=== ITHF ranking - National ===
The rank points of a nation is the sum of its five best players. The table below shows the top 10 nations and the top 10 individuals in every class as of July 14, 2026. Complete table

Rank	Nation	Top player (Rank)	Rank points
1	Latvia	Rainers Kalniņš (1)	22173
2	Sweden	Eddie Nilsson (5)	21137
3	Ukraine	Evgeniy Matantsev (2)	19941
4	Czech Republic	Patrik Petr (11)	19828
5	Finland	Roni Nuttunen (4)	19378
6	Norway	Magnus Klippen (29)	16490
7	Slovenia	Anže Božič (56)	15156
8	Germany	Linus Restel (73)	14243
9	Estonia	Timur Rimski (66)	13380
10	Russia	Pavel Fedorov (143)	13114

=== ITHF ranking - Open ===
Rank	Nation	Player	Rank points
1	Latvia	Rainers Kalniņš	4701
2	Ukraine	Evgeniy Matantsev	4617
3	Latvia	Edgars Caics	4543
4	Finland	Roni Nuttunen	4508
5	Sweden	Eddie Nilsson	4485
6	Latvia	Raivis Miglinieks	4479
7	Ukraine	Artem Matantsev	4372
8	Sweden	Hans Osterman	4325
9	Sweden	Oscar Henriksson	4300
10	Latvia	Elvijs Silins	4242

=== ITHF ranking - Juniors (Under 18) ===
Rank (Open rank)	Nation	Player	Year of birth
1 (32)	Latvia	Henrijs Prokuratovs	2010
2 (43)	Latvia	Janis Mikelis Bitmanis	2009
3 (64)	(Czech Republic) Czechia	Michal Touš	2010
4 (68)	Latvia	Krisjanis Zemnickis	2010
5 (69)	Sweden	James-John Forsberg	2010
6 (84)	Ukraine	Oleksander Pylypenko	2011
7 (78)	Sweden	Gustav Nilsson	2011
8 (90)	Ukraine	Artem Tseluiko	2010
9 (117)	(Czech Republic) Czechia	Vojtěch Kraus	2010
10 (123)	Finland	Eetu Hietaranta	2010

=== ITHF ranking - Ladies ===
Rank (Open rank)	Nation	Player	Rank points
1 (23)	Latvia	Krista Annija Lagzdiņa	3986
2 (55)	Ukraine	Hanna Ivantsova	3422
3 (144)	Estonia	Darja Hrustaljova	2792
4 (152)	Latvia	Elēna Rācenāja	2730
5 (157)	Latvia	Margarita Ābele	2693
6(206)	Ukraine	Polina Kvasnikova	2425
7 (213)	Latvia	Ilze Kirse	2399
8 (232)	Sweden	Liv Osterman	2357
9 (251)	Ukraine	Karyna Pirumshoieva	2235
10(256)	Russia	Kapitolina Semagina	2216

=== ITHF ranking - Veterans (40+) ===
Rank (Open rank)	Nation	Player	Rank points
1 (6)	Sweden	Hans Österman	4362
2 (39)	Sweden	Peter Östlund	3668
3 (43)	Sweden	Joakim Lundin	3537
4 (56)	Sweden	Lars Fridell	3343
5 (59)	Sweden	Truls Månsson	3278
6 (60)	Finland	Kristian Iso-Tryykäri	3277
7 (61)	Finland	Anssi Järvinen	3212
8 (62)	Sweden	Finn Fries	3211
9 (63)	Latvia	Salvis Skarainis	3208
10 (65)	Sweden	Herman Steen	3195

== See also ==
- Table hockey games
- Air hockey
- Stiga
- An equivalent for soccer football is Table football (or "foosball").
