= Stefan Edwall =

Swedish table hockey player (born 1971)

Stefan Edwall (born 1971) is an ITHF table hockey player. He was world champion in 1999, Nordic Champion in 2002, and won at the Oslo Open in 2006.
