= International Table Hockey Federation =

International table hockey governing body

International Table Hockey Federation (ITHF)
- Abbreviation: ITHF
- Formation: 2005; 21 years ago
- Type: Sports federation
- Headquarters: Plzeň, Czech Republic
- Members: 21 member association
- President: Bjarne Axelsen
- Website: ITHF.info

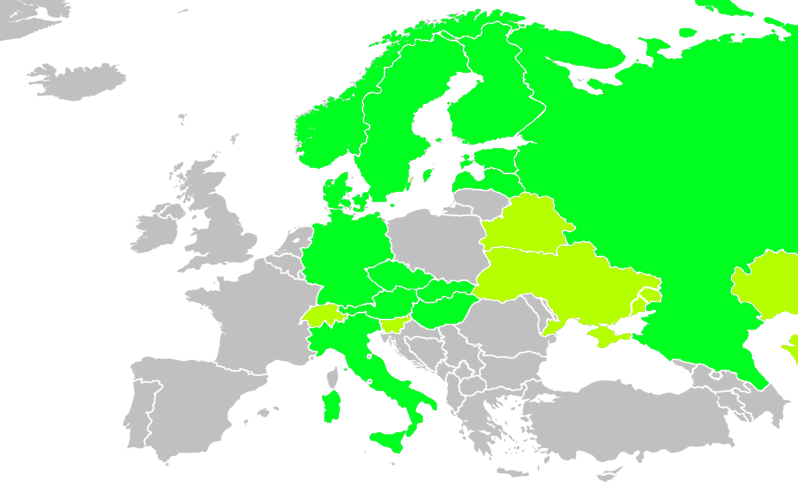
ITHF European countries at 2019

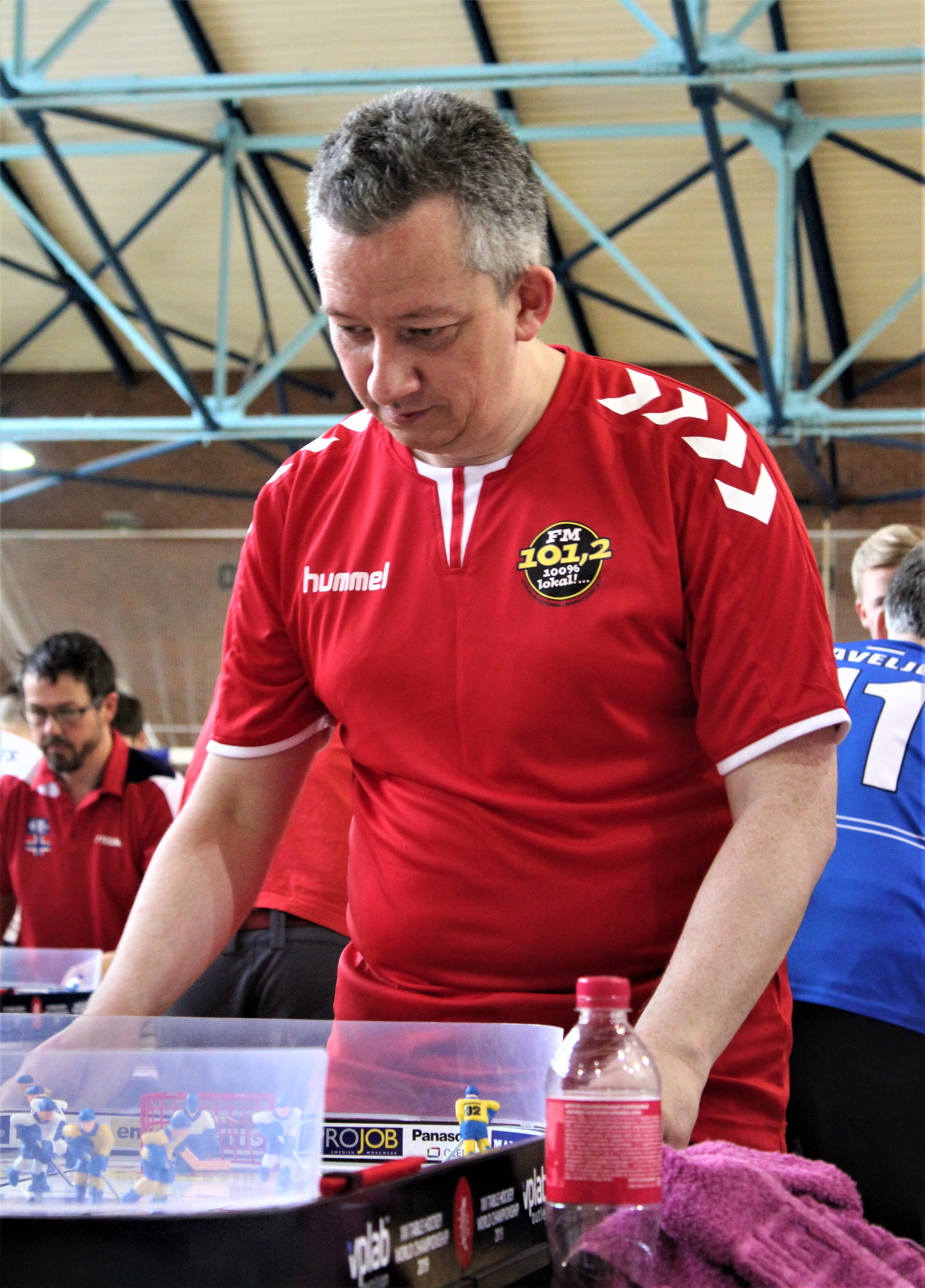
ITHF president Bjarne Axelsen at 2019

International Table Hockey Federation (ITHF) is the world governing body for ITHF table hockey, providing World and European championships, list of biggest international competitions, regulation of game and tournament rules and world ranking. Ranking at 2021 contained about 10,000 players from 70 countries.

It was officially founded in 2005 in Riga, Latvia with 15 member nations (Austria, Canada, Czech Republic, Denmark, Estonia, Finland, Germany, Hungary, Italy, Latvia, Norway, Russia, Slovakia, Sweden and US). Its head office is located in Plzeň, Czech Republic. Bjarne Axelsen is the current president. The BWF currently has 21 member nation around the world, adding Belarus, Kazakhstan, Portugal, Slovenia, Switzerland and Ukraine.

== Constitution ==
The constitution of ITHF states that it is a non-profit international non-governmental organization, the members of which are national associations of world table hockey players. In line with modern requirements, it also includes the fight against doping, as well as confirms religious and racial equality.

Associations wishing to join the ITHF are required to be officially registered in their home country as a table hockey association, with democratically elected leadership, a fixed number of active adult players and open tournaments. Representatives of countries that are unable to meet these requirements shall remain observers.

The supreme authority of the ITHF belongs to the Conference of Delegates - the vote of the representatives of the member states, in which all the officials of the organization are elected.

== Tournaments ==
Since its founding ITHF hold World Championships, which since 1989 until then were organized each second year at meetings of national delegations. ITHF accepted this order as is and added at free years European Championships. ITHF together with national federations organizes World Tour - about 20 major international table hockey tournaments in different countries and World Clubs Championship.

== Ranking ==
The ITHF World Ranking in Open, Women, Juniors and Veterans categories is introduced to determine the strength of the players. Ranking is used for determining the qualification for entry and seeding for the ITHF-sanctioned tournament. The points awarded is based on the final results of each tournament participated for the past 104 weeks, older tournaments results are lowed in points. Junior Ranking consists of players under 19 years old, Veteran Ranking - 40 years and older. Ranking is renewed weekly.

== Staff ==
Executive Committee contains:

- Bjarne Axelsen (Denmark), president
- Mykhaylo Shalomayev (Ukraine), secretary general
- Gustaf Hermansson (Sweden), member
- Igor Saveljev (Estonia), member
- Kevin Rafferty (USA), North America continental manager

Legal Committee contains:

- Gergely Regula (Hungary), chairman
- Intars Žubeckis (Latvia), member
- Rolf Locher (Switzerland), member

== Status ==
In most countries table hockey is not officially recognized as a sport and therefore ITHF works as non-government organization. However, in Latvia local table hockey federation, a member of ITHF, is a legal member of Council of Sports Federations.
