= Hans Österman =

Swedish table hockey player and journalist (born 1978)

Hans Österman (born 1978) is a former ITHF table hockey world champion and journalist from Sweden. He was world champion in 1997, 2001, and 2005. As a journalist, he works for the newspaper Aftonbladet.
