= Axel Tallberg =

Swedish visual artist and engraver

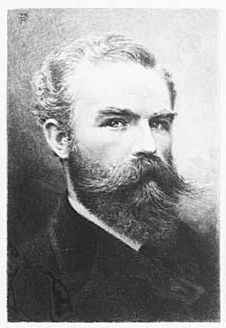
Self-portrait: etching on paper

Axel Tallberg (23 September 1860 – 8 January 1928) was a Swedish visual artist and engraver. He is remembered for his etching course at the Royal Swedish Academy of Art and for his portraits, including those of King Oscar II, Leo Tolstoy and Theodore Roosevelt.

== Biography ==
Born in Gävle, Tallberg was the son of Carl Erik Tallberg, a metalworker, and his wife Kristina Johansson. After graduating from the Royal Swedish Academy of Fine Arts, where he studied from 1878 to 1882, he spent a year in Düsseldorf, perfecting his landscape painting technique, especially the use of watercolours. Soon afterwards he turned to etching, spending some time studying abroad. After visiting Italy, France, Spain, North Africa and Germany, he went to England where from 1889 to 1895 he resided in Burnham to the west of London where he became associated with Swedish etchers.

In 1895, he returned to Sweden where he specialized in etching, and taught an etching course at the Royal Swedish Academy of Fine Arts. Building on the work of Carl Larsson, he became an influential figure among Swedish artists. In 1909, a School of Etching was created at the Academy. He taught there until 1926, gaining the status of professor in 1919 and remained in this position until his retirement in 1926. Many of the well-known Swedish etchers studied under him for varying lengths of time.

Also in 1895, he founded the journal Förgät-mig-ej which he subsequently edited. From 1902, he was Scandinavia's correspondent to the English art journal The Studio and was buried at Norra begravningsplatsen in Stockholm.

Axel Tallberg died in Solna.
