= Svenskt konstnärslexikon =

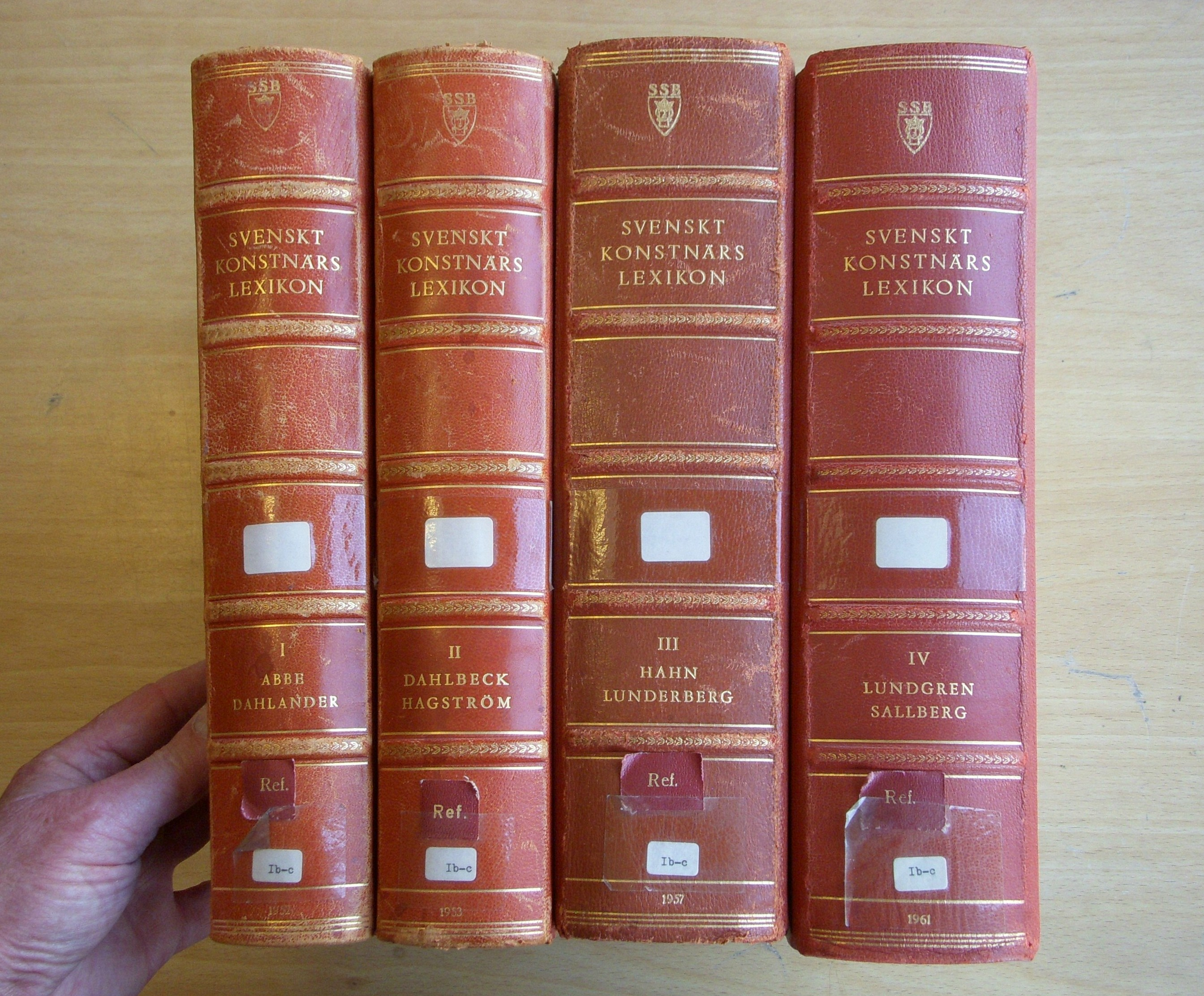
The four first volumes of the Svenskt konstnärslexikon.

The Svenskt konstnärslexikon is a dictionary of Swedish art and artists that was published in five volumes by Allhems Förlag AB from 1952 to 1967. The dictionary includes over 12,000 biographical entries for Swedish artists with detailed bibliographies for each entry. The editors were Gösta Lilja, Bror Olsson, Knut Andersson and S. Artur Svensson, with additional contributions by Johnny Roosval, Ragnar Josephson and Karl Erik Steneberg.
