= List of airports in Turkey =

This is a list of airports in Turkey, sorted by location.

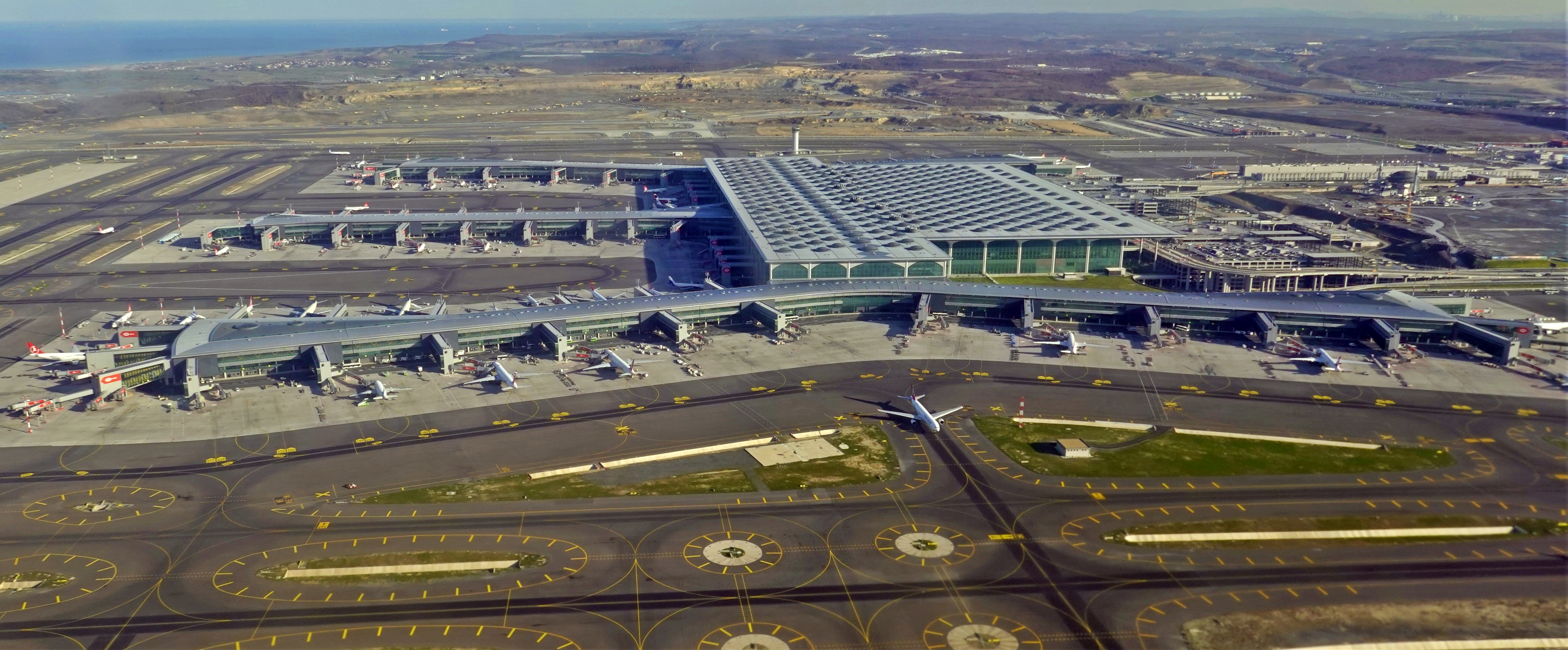
Istanbul Airport is one of the biggest airports in the world.

== Airports ==
Province	ICAO	IATA	Airport name	Coordinate
International airports
Ankara	LTAC	ESB	Ankara Esenboğa Airport	40°07′41″N 32°59′42″E
Antalya	LTFG	GZP	Gazipaşa Airport	36.2993°N 32.3014°E
Antalya	LTAI	AYT	Antalya Airport	36°54′01″N 30°47′34″E
Balıkesir	LTFD	EDO	Balıkesir Koca Seyit Airport	39°33′16″N 27°00′49″E
Bursa	LTBR	YEI	Bursa Yenişehir Airport	40°15′18″N 29°33′45″E
Denizli	LTAY	DNZ	Denizli Çardak Airport	37°47′08″N 29°42′04″E
Diyarbakır	LTCC	DIY	Diyarbakır Airport	37°53′38″N 40°12′03″E
Elazığ	LTCA	EZS	Elazığ Airport	38°36′24″N 39°17′29″E
Erzurum	LTCE	ERZ	Erzurum Airport	39°57′19″N 41°10′09″E
Eskişehir	LTBY	AOE	Eskişehir Hasan Polatkan Airport	39°48′36″N 30°31′10″E
Gaziantep	LTAJ	GZT	Gaziantep Airport	36°56′52″N 37°28′44″E
Hatay	LTDA	HTY	Hatay Airport	36°21′46″N 36°16′56″E
Iğdır	LTCT	IGD	Iğdır Airport	39°58′59″N 43°51′59″E
Isparta	LTFC	ISE	Isparta Süleyman Demirel Airport	37°51′54″N 30°22′55″E
Istanbul	LTFM	IST	Istanbul Airport	41°15′46″N 28°44′28″E
Istanbul	LTFJ	SAW	Istanbul Sabiha Gökçen Airport	40°53′54″N 29°18′33″E
İzmir	LTBJ	ADB	İzmir Adnan Menderes Airport	38°17′21″N 27°09′18″E
Kars	LTCF	KSY	Kars Harakani Airport	40°33′44″N 43°06′54″E
Kayseri	LTAU	ASR	Kayseri Airport	38°46′13″N 35°29′43″E
Kocaeli	LTBQ	KCO	Kocaeli Cengiz Topel Airport	40°44′06″N 30°05′00″E
Konya	LTAN	KYA	Konya Airport	37°58′44″N 32°33′42″E
Kütahya	LTBZ	KZR	Zafer Airport	39°06′41″N 30°07′47″E
Malatya	LTAT	MLX	Malatya Airport	38°26′07″N 38°05′27″E
Mersin	LTDB	COV	Çukurova International Airport	36°53′49″N 35°04′03″E
Muğla	LTBS	DLM	Dalaman Airport	36°42′53″N 28°47′34″E
Muğla	LTFE	BJV	Milas–Bodrum Airport	37°15′02″N 27°39′51″E
Nevşehir	LTAZ	NAV	Nevşehir Kapadokya Airport	38°46′08″N 34°31′35″E
Ordu	LTCB	OGU	Ordu-Giresun Airport	40°58′05″N 38°04′35″E
Rize	LTFO	RZV	Rize-Artvin Airport	41°10′09″N 40°49′44″E
Samsun	LTFH	SZF	Samsun-Çarşamba Airport	41°15′56″N 36°32′55″E
Sinop	LTCM	NOP	Sinop Airport	42°00′57″N 35°03′59″E
Sivas	LTAR	VAS	Sivas Nuri Demirağ Airport	39°46′00″N 37°01′00″E
Şanlıurfa	LTCS	GNY	Şanlıurfa GAP Airport	37°27′00″N 38°54′00″E
Tekirdağ	LTBU	TEQ	Tekirdağ Çorlu Airport	41°08′18″N 27°55′09″E
Trabzon	LTCG	TZX	Trabzon Airport	40.9951°N 39.7897°E
Van	LTCI	VAN	Van Ferit Melen Airport	38°28′06″N 43°19′56″E
Zonguldak	LTAS	ONQ	Zonguldak Çaycuma Airport	41.5064°N 32.0886°E
Domestic airports
Adıyaman	LTCP	ADF	Adıyaman Airport	37°43′54″N 38°28′08″E
Ağrı	LTCO	AJI	Ağrı Ahmed-i Hani Airport	39°39′16″N 43°01′38″E
Amasya	LTAP	MZH	Amasya Merzifon Airport	40°49′45″N 35°31′19″E
Aydın	LTBD	CII	Aydın Çıldır Airport	37°48′54″N 27°53′21″E
Balıkesir	LTBF	BZI	Balıkesir Merkez Airport	39°37′09″N 27°55′33″E
Batman	LTCJ	BAL	Batman Airport	37°55′56″N 41°06′59″E
Bingöl	LTCU	BGG	Bingöl Airport	38°51′36″N 40°35′38″E
Çanakkale	LTBH	CKZ	Çanakkale Airport	40°08′15″N 26°25′36″E
Çanakkale	LTFK	GKD	Gökçeada Airport	40°12′04″N 25°52′56″E
Erzincan	LTCD	ERC	Erzincan Airport	39°42′36″N 39°31′37″E
Hakkari	LTCW	YKO	Hakkari–Yüksekova Selahaddin Eyyubi Airport	37°33′6″N 44°14′01″E
Istanbul	LTBW	–	Istanbul Hezarfen Airfield	41°06′16″N 28°33′00″E
İzmir	LTFB	–	Selçuk–Efes Airport	37°57′02″N 27°19′45″E
Kahramanmaraş	LTCN	KCM	Kahramanmaraş Airport	37°32′20″N 36°57′12″E
Kastamonu	LTAL	KFS	Kastamonu Airport	41.3138°N 33.7949°E
Mardin	LTCR	MQM	Mardin Airport	37°13′58″N 40°38′26″E
Muş	LTCK	MSR	Muş Airport	38°44′41″N 41°39′14″E
Siirt	LTCL	SXZ	Siirt Airport	37°58′00″N 41°50′00″E
Şırnak	LTCV	NKT	Şırnak Şerafettin Elçi Airport	37°21′48″N 42°03′35″E
Tokat	LTAW	TJK	Tokat Airport	40°18′42″N 36°22′25″E
Uşak	LTBO	USQ	Uşak Airport	38.6796°N 29.4816°E
Military airports
Adana	LTAG	UAB	İncirlik Air Base	37°00′07″N 35°25′33″E
Afyon	LTAH	AFY	Afyon Airport	38°43′35″N 30°36′04″E
Amasya	LTAP	MZH	Merzifon Air Base	40°49′45″N 35°31′19″E
Ankara	LTAD	ANK	Etimesgut Air Base	39°56′59″N 32°41′19″E
Ankara	LTAB	–	Güvercinlik Army Air Base	39°56′05″N 32°44′26″E
Ankara	LTAE	–	Mürted Air Base	40°04′44″N 32°33′56″E
Balıkesir	LTBF	BZI	Balıkesir Air Base	39°37′09″N 27°55′33″E
Balıkesir	LTBG	BDM	Bandırma Air Base	40°19′04″N 27°58′39″E
Bursa	LTBE	-	Bursa Yunuseli Airport	40°13′50″N 29°00′40″E
Diyarbakır	LTCC	DIY	Diyarbakır Air Base	37°53′38″N 40°12′03″E
Edirne	LTFL	–	Keşan Army Air Base	40°47′14″N 26°36′24″E
Eskişehir	LTBI	ESK	Eskişehir Air Base	39°47′02″N 30°34′55″E
Eskişehir	LTAV	–	Sivrihisar Air Base	39°27′05″N 31°21′55″E
Istanbul	LTBX	–	Istanbul Samandıra Army Air Base	40°59′34″N 29°12′56″E
İzmir	LTBL	IGL	Çiğli Air Base	38°30′46″N 27°00′36″E
İzmir	LTBK	–	Gaziemir Army Air Base	38°19′08″N 27°09′33″E
İzmir	LTFA	–	Kaklıç Air Base	38°31′26″N 26°58′28″E
Kayseri	LTAU	ASR	Erkilet Air Base	38°46′13″N 35°29′43″E
Kocaeli	LTBQ	KCO	Cengiz Topel Naval Air Station	40°44′06″N 30°05′00″E
Konya	LTAN	KYA	Konya Air Base	37°58′44″N 32°33′42″E
Kütahya	LTBN	–	Kütahya Air Base	39°25′36″N 30°01′00″E
Malatya	LTAT	MLX	Erhaç Air Base	38°26′07″N 38°05′27″E
Malatya	LTAO	–	Malatya Tulga Army Air Base	38°21′14″N 38°15′14″E
Manisa	LTBT	–	Akhisar Air Base	38°48′34″N 27°50′06″E
Muğla	LTBV	BXN	Bodrum-Imsik Airport	37°08′25″N 27°40′11″E
Yalova	LTBP	–	Yalova Air Base	40°41′02″N 29°22′34″E
Defunct airports
Adana	LTAF	ADA	Adana Airport	36°58′55″N 35°16′49″E
Hatay	LTAK	–	İskenderun Airport	36°34′28″N 36°09′12″E
Istanbul	LTBA	ISL	Atatürk Airport	40°58′34″N 28°48′51″E
Samsun	LTAQ	SSX	Samsun Samair Airport	41°16′43″N 36°18′19″E
Şanlıurfa	LTCH	SFQ	Şanlıurfa Airport	37°06′01″N 38°50′34″E
Projected airports
Antalya			Kaş-Demre Batı Antalya Airport	36°13′47″N 29°41′12″E
Bitlis			Tatvan Airport	38°34′15″N 42°20′51″E
Edirne			Edirne-Kırklareli Airport	41°37′43″N 26°53′18″E
İzmir			Çeşme-Alaçatı Airport	38°14′19″N 26°25′22″E
Gümüşhane			Gümüşhane-Bayburt Airport	40°13′23″N 39°47′34″E
Karaman			Karaman Airport	37°16′48″N 33°26′17″E
Niğde			Hasandağı (Niğde Aksaray) Airport	37°50′45″N 34°28′23″E
Yozgat			Yozgat Airport	39°53′21″N 34°59′24″E

== See also ==
- List of the busiest airports in Turkey
- List of the busiest airports in Europe
- List of the busiest airports in the Middle East
- List of Turkish Air Force bases and airfields
- Aviation in Turkey
- List of airports by ICAO code: L#LT – Turkey
- List of airports in Ankara
