= List of Turkish Airlines destinations =

Currently served countries Previously served countries Countries planned to be served Countries served only by Turkish Cargo

Turkish Airlines flies to 53 domestic and 305 international destinations in 133 countries, excluding those only served by Turkish Airlines Cargo. Following is a list of destinations Turkish Airlines and Turkish Airlines Cargo fly to as part of scheduled services, as of November 2026. The list includes the city, country, and the airport's name, with the airline's hub, focus airports, cargo services, future and terminated destinations marked.

The continents with the most destinations outside Turkey are Europe with 125 (including Transcaucasia, Cyprus and Siberia), Asia with 85, Africa with 65 (including Sinai Peninsula), the Americas with 26 and Oceania with 2. Outside Turkey, the countries with the largest number of airports served by the carrier are Russia with 17; the United States with 14; Germany with 11; Italy with 10; France with 8; Saudi Arabia with 7; Iran, Kazakhstan and the United Kingdom with 6; Egypt, Iraq, Spain and Uzbekistan with 5 each.

== Destinations ==
Country	City	Airport	Notes	Refs
Afghanistan	Kabul	Kabul International Airport	Passenger + cargo	
Afghanistan	Mazar-i-Sharif	Mawlana Jalaluddin Mohammad Balkhi International Airport	Passenger	
Albania	Tirana	Tirana International Airport Nënë Tereza	Passenger	
Algeria	Algiers	Houari Boumediene Airport	Passenger + cargo	
Algeria	Batna	Mostépha Ben Boulaid Airport	Terminated	
Algeria	Constantine	Mohamed Boudiaf International Airport	Passenger	
Algeria	Oran	Ahmed Ben Bella Airport	Passenger	
Algeria	Tlemcen	Zenata – Messali El Hadj Airport	Terminated	
Angola	Luanda	Dr. António Agostinho Neto International Airport	Suspended	
Angola	Luanda	Quatro de Fevereiro Airport	Terminated	
Argentina	Buenos Aires	Ezeiza International Airport	Passenger + cargo	
Armenia	Yerevan	Zvartnots International Airport	Passenger + cargo	
Australia	Melbourne	Melbourne Airport	Passenger + cargo	
Australia	Sydney	Sydney Airport	Passenger + cargo	
Austria	Graz	Graz Airport	Terminated	
Austria	Linz	Linz Airport	Terminated	
Austria	Salzburg	Salzburg Airport	Passenger	
Austria	Vienna	Vienna International Airport	Passenger + cargo	
Azerbaijan	Baku	Heydar Aliyev International Airport	Passenger + cargo	
Azerbaijan	Ganja	Ganja International Airport	Passenger	
Azerbaijan	Nakhchivan	Nakhchivan International Airport	Passenger	
Bahrain	Manama	Bahrain International Airport	Passenger	
Bangladesh	Dhaka	Hazrat Shahjalal International Airport	Passenger + cargo	
Belarus	Minsk	Minsk National Airport	Passenger	
Belgium	Brussels	Brussels Airport	Passenger + cargo	
Belgium	Liège	Liège Airport	Cargo	
Benin	Cotonou	Cadjehoun Airport	Passenger + cargo	
Bosnia and Herzegovina	Sarajevo	Sarajevo International Airport	Passenger	
Bosnia and Herzegovina	Tuzla	Tuzla International Airport	Terminated	
Brazil	Campinas	Viracopos International Airport	Terminated	
Brazil	São Paulo	São Paulo/Guarulhos International Airport	Passenger + cargo	
Bulgaria	Sofia	Sofia Airport	Passenger	
Bulgaria	Varna	Varna Airport	Passenger	
Burkina Faso	Ouagadougou	Thomas Sankara International Airport Ouagadougou	Passenger + cargo	
Cambodia	Phnom Penh	Techo International Airport	Passenger + cargo	
Cameroon	Douala	Douala International Airport	Passenger + cargo	
Cameroon	Yaoundé	Yaoundé Nsimalen International Airport	Passenger + cargo	
Canada	Montreal	Montréal–Trudeau International Airport	Passenger + cargo	
Canada	Toronto	Toronto Pearson International Airport	Passenger + cargo	
Canada	Vancouver	Vancouver International Airport	Passenger + cargo	
Chad	N'Djamena	N'Djamena International Airport	Passenger	
Chile	Santiago	Arturo Merino Benítez International Airport	Passenger + cargo	
China	Beijing	Beijing Capital International Airport	Passenger + cargo	
China	Chengdu	Chengdu Tianfu International Airport	Passenger	
China	Chengdu	Chengdu Shuangliu International Airport	Cargo	
China	Guangzhou	Guangzhou Baiyun International Airport	Passenger + cargo	
China	Shanghai	Shanghai Pudong International Airport	Passenger + cargo	
China	Shenzhen	Shenzhen Bao'an International Airport	Cargo	
China	Ürümqi	Ürümqi Tianshan International Airport	Cargo	
China	Xi'an	Xi'an Xianyang International Airport	Passenger	
China	Zhengzhou	Zhengzhou Xinzheng International Airport	Cargo	
Colombia	Bogotá	El Dorado International Airport	Passenger + cargo	
Comoros	Moroni	Prince Said Ibrahim International Airport	Seasonal	
Congo, Democratic Republic of	Kinshasa	N'djili Airport	Suspended	
Congo, Republic of	Pointe-Noire	Agostinho-Neto International Airport	Suspended	
Croatia	Dubrovnik	Dubrovnik Airport	Seasonal	
Croatia	Zagreb	Zagreb Airport	Passenger	
Cuba	Havana	José Martí International Airport	Passenger	
Curaçao	Curaçao	Curaçao International Airport	Terminated	
Cyprus	Nicosia	Nicosia International Airport	Terminated	
Czech Republic	Prague	Václav Havel Airport Prague	Passenger + cargo	
Denmark	Aalborg	Aalborg Airport	Terminated	
Denmark	Billund	Billund Airport	Suspended	
Denmark	Copenhagen	Copenhagen Airport	Passenger	
Djibouti	Djibouti City	Djibouti-Ambouli International Airport	Passenger	
Ecuador	Quito	Mariscal Sucre International Airport	Cargo	
Egypt	Alexandria	Alexandria International Airport	Passenger	
Egypt	Cairo	Cairo International Airport	Passenger + cargo	
Egypt	Hurghada	Hurghada International Airport	Suspended	
Egypt	Luxor	Luxor International Airport	Passenger	
Egypt	Sharm El Sheikh	Sharm El Sheikh International Airport	Passenger	
Equatorial Guinea	Malabo	Malabo International Airport	Passenger	
Eritrea	Asmara	Asmara International Airport	Passenger + cargo	
Estonia	Tallinn	Tallinn Airport	Passenger	
Ethiopia	Addis Ababa	Addis Ababa Bole International Airport	Passenger + cargo	
Finland	Helsinki	Helsinki Airport	Passenger + cargo	
Finland	Rovaniemi	Rovaniemi Airport	Seasonal	
France	Bordeaux	Bordeaux–Mérignac Airport	Passenger	
France	Lyon	Lyon–Saint-Exupéry Airport	Passenger + cargo	
France	Marseille	Marseille Provence Airport	Passenger	
France	Nice	Nice Côte d'Azur Airport	Passenger	
France	Paris	Charles de Gaulle Airport	Passenger + cargo	
France	Paris	Orly Airport	Terminated	
France	Strasbourg	Strasbourg Airport	Terminated	
France	Toulouse	Toulouse–Blagnac Airport	Passenger	
Gabon	Libreville	Léon-Mba International Airport	Suspended	
Gambia	Banjul	Banjul International Airport	Passenger + cargo	
Georgia	Batumi	Batumi International Airport	Passenger	
Georgia	Tbilisi	Tbilisi International Airport	Passenger + cargo	
Germany	Berlin	Berlin Brandenburg Airport	Passenger + cargo	
Germany	Berlin	Berlin Schönefeld Airport	Airport closed	
Germany	Berlin	Berlin Tegel Airport	Airport closed	
Germany	Bremen	Bremen Airport	Passenger	
Germany	Cologne; Bonn	Cologne Bonn Airport	Passenger	
Germany	Düsseldorf	Düsseldorf Airport	Passenger + cargo	
Germany	Frankfurt	Frankfurt Airport	Passenger + cargo	
Germany	Friedrichshafen	Friedrichshafen Airport	Terminated	
Germany	Hamburg	Hamburg Airport	Passenger	
Germany	Hanover	Hannover Airport	Passenger	
Germany	Karlsruhe; Baden-Baden	Karlsruhe/Baden-Baden Airport	Terminated	
Germany	Leipzig	Leipzig/Halle Airport	Suspended	
Germany	Munich	Munich Airport	Passenger + cargo	
Germany	Münster; Osnabrück	Münster Osnabrück Airport	Terminated	
Germany	Nuremberg	Nuremberg Airport	Passenger	
Germany	Stuttgart	Stuttgart Airport	Passenger	
Ghana	Accra	Accra International Airport	Passenger + cargo	
Greece	Athens	Athens International Airport	Passenger + cargo	
Greece	Athens	Ellinikon International Airport	Airport closed	
Greece	Thessaloniki	Thessaloniki Airport	Passenger	
Guinea	Conakry	Ahmed Sékou Touré International Airport	Passenger + cargo	
Hong Kong	Hong Kong	Hong Kong International Airport	Passenger + cargo	
Hungary	Budapest	Budapest Ferenc Liszt International Airport	Passenger + cargo	
India	Ahmedabad	Ahmedabad Airport	Terminated	
India	Bengaluru	Kempegowda International Airport	Cargo	
India	Chennai	Chennai International Airport	Cargo	
India	Delhi	Indira Gandhi International Airport	Passenger + cargo	
India	Hyderabad	Rajiv Gandhi International Airport	Cargo	
India	Mumbai	Chhatrapati Shivaji Maharaj International Airport	Passenger + cargo	
India	Mumbai	Navi Mumbai International Airport	Cargo	
Indonesia	Denpasar	Ngurah Rai International Airport	Passenger + cargo	
Indonesia	Jakarta	Soekarno–Hatta International Airport	Passenger + cargo	
Iran	Ahvaz	Qasem Soleimani International Airport	Terminated	
Iran	Isfahan	Isfahan Shahid Beheshti International Airport	Terminated	
Iran	Kermanshah	Kermanshah Airport	Terminated	
Iran	Mashhad	Mashhad Shahid Hasheminejad International Airport	Terminated	
Iran	Shiraz	Shiraz Shahid Dastgheib International Airport	Terminated	
Iran	Tabriz	Tabriz Shahid Madani International Airport	Terminated	
Iran	Tehran	Imam Khomeini International Airport	Terminated	
Iran	Urmia	Urmia Shahid Bakeri International Airport	Terminated	
Iraq	Baghdad	Baghdad International Airport	Passenger + cargo	
Iraq	Basra	Basra International Airport	Passenger	
Iraq	Erbil	Erbil International Airport	Passenger + cargo	
Iraq	Kirkuk	Kirkuk International Airport	Suspended	
Iraq	Mosul	Mosul International Airport	Terminated	
Iraq	Najaf	Al Najaf International Airport	Suspended	
Iraq	Sulaymaniyah	Jalal Talabani International Airport	Passenger	
Ireland	Dublin	Dublin Airport	Passenger + cargo	
Ireland	Shannon	Shannon Airport	Terminated	
Israel	Tel Aviv	Ben Gurion Airport	Suspended	
Italy	Bari	Bari Karol Wojtyła Airport	Passenger	
Italy	Bergamo	Milan Bergamo Airport	Passenger	
Italy	Bologna	Bologna Guglielmo Marconi Airport	Passenger	
Italy	Catania	Catania–Fontanarossa Airport	Passenger	
Italy	Genoa	Genoa Cristoforo Colombo Airport	Terminated	
Italy	Milan	Milan Linate Airport	Terminated	
Italy	Milan	Milan Malpensa Airport	Passenger + cargo	
Italy	Naples	Naples International Airport	Passenger	
Italy	Palermo	Palermo Airport	Passenger	
Italy	Pisa	Pisa International Airport	Terminated	
Italy	Rome	Rome Fiumicino Airport	Passenger + cargo	
Italy	Turin	Turin Airport	Passenger	
Italy	Venice	Venice Marco Polo Airport	Passenger	
Ivory Coast	Abidjan	Félix-Houphouët-Boigny International Airport	Passenger + cargo	
Japan	Osaka	Kansai International Airport	Passenger + cargo	
Japan	Tokyo	Haneda Airport	Passenger + cargo	
Japan	Tokyo	Narita International Airport	Passenger + cargo	
Jordan	Amman	Queen Alia International Airport	Passenger + cargo	
Jordan	Aqaba	King Hussein International Airport	Suspended	
Kazakhstan	Aktau	Aktau International Airport	Passenger	
Kazakhstan	Aktobe	Aktobe International Airport	Terminated	
Kazakhstan	Almaty	Almaty International Airport	Passenger + cargo	
Kazakhstan	Astana	Nursultan Nazarbayev International Airport	Passenger + cargo	
Kazakhstan	Atyrau	Atyrau Airport	Passenger	
Kazakhstan	Karaganda	Sary-Arka Airport	Passenger	
Kazakhstan	Shymkent	Şymkent International Airport	Cargo	
Kazakhstan	Turkistan	Äziret Sūltan International Airport	Suspended	
Kenya	Mombasa	Moi International Airport	Passenger	
Kenya	Nairobi	Jomo Kenyatta International Airport	Passenger + cargo	
Kosovo	Pristina	Pristina International Airport	Passenger	
Kuwait	Kuwait City	Kuwait International Airport	Passenger + cargo	
Kyrgyzstan	Bishkek	Manas International Airport	Passenger + cargo	
Kyrgyzstan	Osh	Osh Airport	Terminated	
Latvia	Riga	Riga International Airport	Passenger	
Lebanon	Beirut	Beirut–Rafic Hariri International Airport	Passenger + cargo	
Liberia	Monrovia	Roberts International Airport	Suspended	
Libya	Benghazi	Benina International Airport	Passenger	
Libya	Misrata	Misrata Airport	Passenger	
Libya	Sabha	Sabha Airport	Terminated	
Libya	Tripoli	Mitiga International Airport	Passenger + cargo	
Libya	Tripoli	Tripoli International Airport	Terminated	
Lithuania	Kaunas	Kaunas Airport	Terminated	
Lithuania	Vilnius	Vilnius Airport	Passenger + cargo	
Luxembourg	Luxembourg City	Luxembourg Airport	Passenger	
Macau	Macau	Macau International Airport	Terminated	
Madagascar	Antananarivo	Ivato International Airport	Passenger + cargo	
Malaysia	Kuala Lumpur	Kuala Lumpur International Airport	Passenger + cargo	
Maldives	Malé	Velana International Airport	Passenger + Cargo	
Mali	Bamako	Modibo Keita International Airport	Passenger	
Malta	Valletta	Malta International Airport	Passenger + cargo	
Mauritania	Nouakchott	Nouakchott–Oumtounsy International Airport	Passenger + cargo	
Mauritius	Port Louis	Sir Seewoosagur Ramgoolam International Airport	Passenger + cargo	
Mexico	Cancún	Cancún International Airport	Passenger + cargo	
Mexico	Mexico City	Felipe Ángeles International Airport	Cargo	
Mexico	Mexico City	Mexico City International Airport	Passenger + cargo	
Moldova	Chișinău	Chișinău International Airport	Passenger	
Mongolia	Ulaanbaatar	Buyant-Ukhaa International Airport	Terminated	
Mongolia	Ulaanbaatar	Chinggis Khaan International Airport	Passenger + cargo	
Montenegro	Podgorica	Podgorica Airport	Passenger	
Montenegro	Tivat	Tivat Airport	Seasonal	
Morocco	Casablanca	Mohammed V International Airport	Passenger + cargo	
Morocco	Marrakesh	Marrakesh Menara Airport	Passenger	
Mozambique	Maputo	Maputo International Airport	Passenger + cargo	
Myanmar	Yangon	Yangon International Airport	Terminated	
Namibia	Windhoek	Hosea Kutako International Airport	Terminated	
Nepal	Kathmandu	Tribhuvan International Airport	Passenger + cargo	
Netherlands	Amsterdam	Amsterdam Airport Schiphol	Passenger + cargo	
Netherlands	Maastricht	Maastricht Aachen Airport	Cargo	
Netherlands	Rotterdam; The Hague	Rotterdam The Hague Airport	Terminated	
Niger	Niamey	Diori Hamani International Airport	Passenger	
Nigeria	Abuja	Nnamdi Azikiwe International Airport	Passenger + cargo	
Nigeria	Kano	Mallam Aminu Kano International Airport	Terminated	
Nigeria	Lagos	Murtala Muhammed International Airport	Passenger + cargo	
Nigeria	Port Harcourt	Port Harcourt International Airport	Passenger	
North Macedonia	Ohrid	Ohrid St. Paul the Apostle Airport	Seasonal	
North Macedonia	Skopje	Skopje International Airport	Passenger	
Northern Cyprus	Famagusta	Geçitkale Airport	Terminated	
Northern Cyprus	North Nicosia	Ercan International Airport	Passenger	
Norway	Oslo	Oslo Airport, Gardermoen	Passenger + cargo	
Oman	Muscat	Muscat International Airport	Passenger + cargo	
Pakistan	Islamabad	Benazir Bhutto International Airport	Airport closed	
Pakistan	Islamabad	Islamabad International Airport	Passenger + cargo	
Pakistan	Karachi	Jinnah International Airport	Passenger + cargo	
Pakistan	Lahore	Allama Iqbal International Airport	Passenger + cargo	
Panama	Panama City	Tocumen International Airport	Passenger + cargo	
Peru	Lima	Jorge Chávez International Airport	Begins 11 August 2027	
Philippines	Cebu	Mactan–Cebu International Airport	Terminated	
Philippines	Manila	Ninoy Aquino International Airport	Passenger + cargo	
Poland	Kraków	Kraków John Paul II International Airport	Passenger	
Poland	Warsaw	Warsaw Chopin Airport	Passenger	
Portugal	Lisbon	Lisbon Airport	Passenger	
Portugal	Porto	Porto Airport	Passenger	
Puerto Rico	Aguadilla	Rafael Hernández Airport	Terminated	
Qatar	Doha	Doha International Airport	Airport closed	
Qatar	Doha	Hamad International Airport	Passenger + cargo	
Romania	Bucharest	Bucharest Henri Coandă International Airport	Passenger + cargo	
Romania	Cluj-Napoca	Cluj International Airport	Passenger	
Romania	Constanța	Mihail Kogălniceanu International Airport	Passenger	
Romania	Timișoara	Timișoara Traian Vuia International Airport	Passenger	
Russia	Astrakhan	Narimanovo Airport	Terminated	
Russia	Chelyabinsk	Kurchatov Chelyabinsk International Airport	Passenger	
Russia	Kaliningrad	Khrabrovo Airport	Passenger	
Russia	Kazan	Kazan International Airport	Passenger	
Russia	Krasnodar	Krasnodar International Airport	Airport closed	
Russia	Moscow	Moscow Domodedovo Airport	Seasonal	
Russia	Moscow	Sheremetyevo International Airport	Cargo	
Russia	Moscow	Vnukovo International Airport	Passenger + cargo	
Russia	Novosibirsk	Tolmachevo Airport	Terminated	
Russia	Omsk	Omsk Central Airport	Seasonal	
Russia	Perm	Perm International Airport	Passenger	
Russia	Rostov-on-Don	Platov International Airport	Airport closed	
Russia	Rostov-on-Don	Rostov-on-Don Airport	Airport closed	
Russia	Saint Petersburg	Pulkovo Airport	Passenger	
Russia	Samara	Kurumoch International Airport	Passenger	
Russia	Sochi	Sochi International Airport	Passenger	
Russia	Stavropol	Stavropol Shpakovskoye Airport	Terminated	
Russia	Surgut	Farman Salmanov Surgut Airport	Passenger	
Russia	Tyumen	Roshchino International Airport	Seasonal	
Russia	Ufa	Ufa International Airport	Passenger	
Russia	Voronezh	Voronezh International Airport	Airport closed	
Russia	Yekaterinburg	Koltsovo International Airport	Passenger	
Rwanda	Kigali	Kigali International Airport	Passenger	
Saudi Arabia	Dammam	King Fahd International Airport	Passenger + cargo	
Saudi Arabia	Gassim	Prince Naif bin Abdulaziz International Airport	Passenger	
Saudi Arabia	Jeddah	King Abdulaziz International Airport	Passenger + cargo	
Saudi Arabia	Medina	Prince Mohammad bin Abdulaziz International Airport	Passenger + cargo	
Saudi Arabia	Riyadh	King Khalid International Airport	Passenger + cargo	
Saudi Arabia	Taif	Taif International Airport	Passenger	
Saudi Arabia	Yanbu	Prince Abdulmohsen Bin Abdulaziz International Airport	Passenger	
Senegal	Dakar	Blaise Diagne International Airport	Passenger + cargo	
Senegal	Dakar	Léopold Sédar Senghor International Airport	Terminated	
Serbia	Belgrade	Belgrade Nikola Tesla Airport	Passenger + cargo	
Serbia	Niš	Niš Constantine the Great Airport	Terminated	
Seychelles	Mahé	Seychelles International Airport	Cargo	
Sierra Leone	Freetown	Freetown International Airport	Suspended	
Singapore	Singapore	Changi Airport	Passenger + cargo	
Slovakia	Bratislava	Bratislava Airport	Terminated	
Slovakia	Košice	Košice International Airport	Terminated	
Slovenia	Ljubljana	Ljubljana Airport	Passenger	
Slovenia	Maribor	Maribor Edvard Rusjan Airport	Terminated	
Somalia	Mogadishu	Aden Adde International Airport	Passenger	
South Africa	Cape Town	Cape Town International Airport	Passenger + cargo	
South Africa	Durban	King Shaka International Airport	Passenger + cargo	
South Africa	Johannesburg	O. R. Tambo International Airport	Passenger + cargo	
South Korea	Seoul	Incheon International Airport	Passenger + cargo	
South Sudan	Juba	Juba International Airport	Suspended	
Spain	Barcelona	Josep Tarradellas Barcelona–El Prat Airport	Passenger + cargo	
Spain	Bilbao	Bilbao Airport	Passenger	
Spain	Madrid	Madrid–Barajas Airport	Passenger + cargo	
Spain	Málaga	Málaga Airport	Passenger + cargo	
Spain	Santiago de Compostela	Santiago–Rosalía de Castro Airport	Terminated	
Spain	Seville	Seville Airport	Passenger	
Spain	Valencia	Valencia Airport	Passenger	
Spain	Zaragoza	Zaragoza Airport	Terminated	
Sri Lanka	Colombo	Bandaranaike International Airport	Passenger + cargo	
Sudan	Khartoum	Khartoum International Airport	Terminated	
Sudan	Port Sudan	Port Sudan New International Airport	Seasonal	
Sweden	Gothenburg	Göteborg Landvetter Airport	Passenger	
Sweden	Stockholm	Stockholm Arlanda Airport	Passenger	
Switzerland	Geneva	Geneva Airport	Passenger + cargo	
Switzerland	Zürich	Zurich Airport	Passenger + cargo	
Switzerland; France; Germany	Basel; Mulhouse; Freiburg	EuroAirport Basel Mulhouse Freiburg	Passenger + cargo	
Syria	Aleppo	Aleppo International Airport	Passenger	
Syria	Damascus	Damascus International Airport	Passenger	
Taiwan	Taipei	Taoyuan International Airport	Passenger + cargo	
Tajikistan	Dushanbe	Dushanbe International Airport	Passenger	
Tajikistan	Khujand	Khujand Airport	Terminated	
Tanzania	Dar es Salaam	Julius Nyerere International Airport	Passenger	
Tanzania	Kilimanjaro	Kilimanjaro International Airport	Passenger	
Tanzania	Zanzibar	Abeid Amani Karume International Airport	Passenger	
Thailand	Bangkok	Suvarnabhumi Airport	Passenger + cargo	
Thailand	Phuket	Phuket International Airport	Passenger + cargo	
Tunisia	Tunis	Tunis–Carthage International Airport	Passenger + cargo	
Turkey	Adana	Adana Şakirpaşa Airport	Terminated	
Turkey	Adıyaman	Adıyaman Airport	Passenger	
Turkey	Afyonkarahisar	Afyon Airport	Terminated	
Turkey	Ağrı	Ağrı Airport	Passenger	
Turkey	Akhisar	Akhisar Airport	Terminated	
Turkey	Alanya	Gazipaşa–Alanya Airport	Passenger	
Turkey	Ankara	Ankara Güvercinlik Airport	Terminated	
Turkey	Ankara	Ankara Esenboğa Airport	Hub	
Turkey	Antalya	Antalya Airport	Focus city	
Turkey	Aydın	Aydın Çıldır Airport	Terminated	
Turkey	Balıkesir	Balıkesir Airport	Terminated	
Turkey	Bandırma	Bandırma Airport	Terminated	
Turkey	Batman	Batman Airport	Passenger	
Turkey	Bingöl	Bingöl Airport	Passenger	
Turkey	Bodrum	Milas–Bodrum Airport	Passenger	
Turkey	Bursa	Bursa Yunuseli Airport	Terminated	
Turkey	Bursa	Yenişehir Airport	Passenger	
Turkey	Çanakkale	Çanakkale Airport	Passenger	
Turkey	Dalaman	Dalaman Airport	Passenger	
Turkey	Denizli	Denizli Çardak Airport	Passenger	
Turkey	Diyarbakır	Diyarbakır Airport	Passenger	
Turkey	Edremit	Balıkesir Koca Seyit Airport	Passenger	
Turkey	Elazığ	Elazığ Airport	Passenger	
Turkey	Erzincan	Erzincan Airport	Passenger	
Turkey	Erzurum	Erzurum Airport	Passenger	
Turkey	Eskişehir	Hasan Polatkan Airport	Passenger	
Turkey	Gaziantep	Gaziantep Oğuzeli Airport	Passenger	
Turkey	Hakkâri	Hakkari–Yüksekova Airport	Passenger	
Turkey	Hatay	Hatay Airport	Passenger	
Turkey	Isparta	Isparta Süleyman Demirel Airport	Passenger	
Turkey	Istanbul	Atatürk Airport	Terminated	
Turkey	Istanbul	Istanbul Airport	Hub	
Turkey	Istanbul	Sabiha Gökçen International Airport	Terminated	
Turkey	İskenderun	İskenderun Airport	Airport closed	
Turkey	İzmir	İzmir Adnan Menderes Airport	Focus city	
Turkey	İzmir	Çiğli Airport	Terminated	
Turkey	Iğdır	Iğdır Airport	Passenger	
Turkey	Kahramanmaraş	Kahramanmaraş Airport	Passenger	
Turkey	Kars	Kars Harakani Airport	Passenger	
Turkey	Kastamonu	Kastamonu Airport	Passenger	
Turkey	Kayseri	Erkilet International Airport	Passenger	
Turkey	Kocaeli	Cengiz Topel Airport	Passenger	
Turkey	Konya	Konya Airport	Passenger	
Turkey	Kütahya	Kütahya Airport	Terminated	
Turkey	Kütahya	Zafer Airport	Passenger	
Turkey	Malatya	Malatya Erhaç Airport	Passenger	
Turkey	Mardin	Mardin Airport	Passenger	
Turkey	Merzifon	Amasya Merzifon Airport	Passenger	
Turkey	Muş	Muş Airport	Passenger	
Turkey	Nevşehir	Nevşehir Kapadokya Airport	Passenger	
Turkey	Ordu; Giresun	Ordu-Giresun Airport	Passenger	
Turkey	Rize; Artvin	Rize–Artvin Airport	Passenger	
Turkey	Samsun	Samsun-Çarşamba Airport	Passenger	
Turkey	Samsun	Samsun Samair Airport	Airport closed	
Turkey	Şanlıurfa	Şanlıurfa Airport	Airport closed	
Turkey	Şanlıurfa	Şanlıurfa GAP Airport	Passenger	
Turkey	Siirt	Siirt Airport	Passenger	
Turkey	Sinop	Sinop Airport	Passenger	
Turkey	Sivas	Sivas Airport	Passenger	
Turkey	Şırnak	Şırnak Şerafettin Elçi Airport	Passenger	
Turkey	Tarsus/Mersin/Adana	Çukurova International Airport	Passenger + cargo	
Turkey	Tekirdağ	Tekirdağ Çorlu Atatürk Airport	Passenger	
Turkey	Tokat	Tokat Airport	Passenger	
Turkey	Trabzon	Trabzon Airport	Passenger	
Turkey	Uşak	Uşak Airport	Passenger	
Turkey	Van	Van Ferit Melen Airport	Passenger	
Turkey	Yalova	Yalova Airport	Terminated	
Turkey	Zonguldak	Zonguldak Airport	Passenger	
Turkmenistan	Ashgabat	Aşgabat International Airport	Passenger	
Turkmenistan	Türkmenabat	Türkmenabat International Airport	Terminated	
Turkmenistan	Türkmenbaşy	Türkmenbaşy International Airport	Passenger	
Uganda	Entebbe	Entebbe International Airport	Passenger + cargo	
Ukraine	Dnipro	Dnipro International Airport	Terminated	
Ukraine	Donetsk	Donetsk International Airport	Terminated	
Ukraine	Ivano-Frankivsk	Ivano-Frankivsk International Airport	Terminated	
Ukraine	Kharkiv	Kharkiv International Airport	Terminated	
Ukraine	Kherson	Kherson International Airport	Terminated	
Ukraine	Kyiv	Boryspil International Airport	Terminated	
Ukraine	Lviv	Lviv Danylo Halytskyi International Airport	Terminated	
Ukraine	Mykolaiv	Mykolaiv Airport	Terminated	
Ukraine	Odesa	Odesa International Airport	Terminated	
Ukraine	Simferopol	Simferopol International Airport	Terminated	
Ukraine	Zaporizhzhia	Zaporizhzhia International Airport	Terminated	
United Arab Emirates	Abu Dhabi	Zayed International Airport	Passenger	
United Arab Emirates	Dubai	Al Maktoum International Airport	Cargo	
United Arab Emirates	Dubai	Dubai International Airport	Passenger + cargo	
United Arab Emirates	Sharjah	Sharjah International Airport	Passenger	
United Kingdom	Birmingham	Birmingham Airport	Passenger	
United Kingdom	Edinburgh	Edinburgh Airport	Passenger	
United Kingdom	London	Gatwick Airport	Passenger	
United Kingdom	London	Heathrow Airport	Passenger + cargo	
United Kingdom	London	Luton Airport	Terminated	
United Kingdom	London	London Stansted Airport	Passenger + cargo	
United Kingdom	Manchester	Manchester Airport	Passenger	
United States	Atlanta	Hartsfield–Jackson Atlanta International Airport	Passenger + cargo	
United States	Boston	Logan International Airport	Passenger + cargo	
United States	Chicago	O'Hare International Airport	Passenger + cargo	
United States	Columbus	Rickenbacker International Airport	Terminated	
United States	Dallas/Arlington/Fort Worth	Dallas Fort Worth International Airport	Passenger + cargo	
United States	Denver	Denver International Airport	Passenger + cargo	
United States	Detroit	Detroit Metropolitan Airport	Passenger + cargo	
United States	Houston	George Bush Intercontinental Airport	Passenger + cargo	
United States	Los Angeles	Los Angeles International Airport	Passenger + cargo	
United States	Miami	Miami International Airport	Passenger + cargo	
United States	New York City	John F. Kennedy International Airport	Passenger + cargo	
United States	Newark	Newark Liberty International Airport	Passenger + cargo	
United States	San Francisco	San Francisco International Airport	Passenger + cargo	
United States	Seattle	Seattle–Tacoma International Airport	Passenger + cargo	
United States	Washington, D.C.	Dulles International Airport	Passenger + cargo	
Uzbekistan	Bukhara	Bukhara International Airport	Passenger	
Uzbekistan	Fergana	Fergana International Airport	Suspended	
Uzbekistan	Navoiy	Navoiy International Airport	Terminated	
Uzbekistan	Samarkand	Samarkand International Airport	Passenger	
Uzbekistan	Tashkent	Tashkent International Airport	Passenger + cargo	
Uzbekistan	Urgench	Urgench International Airport	Passenger	
Venezuela	Caracas	Simón Bolívar International Airport	Passenger + cargo	
Vietnam	Hanoi	Noi Bai International Airport	Passenger + cargo	
Vietnam	Ho Chi Minh City	Tan Son Nhat International Airport	Passenger + cargo	
Yemen	Aden	Aden International Airport	Terminated	
Yemen	Sanaa	Sanaa International Airport	Terminated	
Zambia	Lusaka	Kenneth Kaunda International Airport	Suspended	
