= List of Turkish Air Force bases and airfields =

The following is a partial list of Turkish Air Force bases and airfields, past and present.

== Major active-duty installations ==
Until 2015 the combat formations of the Turkish Air Force were formed into two air forces (equal to air armies) - the 1st Air Force, covering the western part of the country, and the 2nd Air Force, covering the eastern part. The two have been merged into the Combat Air Force and Missile Air Defence Command (Muharip Hava Kuvveti ve Hava Füze Savunma Komutanlığı), headquartered at Eskişehir Air Base. The main air bases, which are tasked to regularly support full-spectrum operations, including those of the air combat squadrons are brigade equivalents called Main Jet Base Command (Ana Jet Üs Komutanlığı). The ground-based missile air defence squadrons are formed in Missile Base Command (Füze Üs Komutanlığı). The UAV units are centered around a Unmanned Aircraft Systems Main Base Command (İnsansız Uçak Sistemleri Ana Üs Komutanlığı) and the TAF's tanker aircraft around a Tanker Base Command (Tanker Üs Komutanlığı). The tactical air transport, VIP and MedEvac squadrons are formed into two Air Transport Main Base Command (Hava Ulaştırma Ana Üs Komutanlığı) subordinated to the Air Logistics Command, together with the second line maintenance and with the storage facilities of the TAF. Air training is centered around the Main Jet Base Flight Training Center Command (Ana Jet Üs Uçuş Eğitim Merkez Komutanlığı) under the Air Training Command. Current operational "major" active duty air bases and facilities, some with ICAO Airport Codes:

| Installation | ICAO | Province | Command | Wing | Function | Lat | Long |
|---|---|---|---|---|---|---|---|
| Balıkesir Air Base | LTBF | Balıkesir | Former 1st TAF | 9th MJBC | Multirole F-16 combat squadrons in Western Turkey. | 39.61917 | 27.92583 |
| Bandırma Air Base | LTBG | Balıkesir | Former 1st TAF | 6th MJBC | Multirole F-16 combat squadrons in Northwestern Turkey. | 40.31778 | 27.97722 |
| Çiğli Air Base | LTBL | İzmir | TAF Training | 2nd MJBFTCC | Main advanced flying training airbase. | 38.51278 | 27.01000 |
| Diyarbakır Air Base | LTCC | Diyarbakır | Former 2nd TAF HQ | 8th MJBC | F-16 squadrons in Southeastern Turkey. | 37.89389 | 40.20083 |
| Erhaç Air Base | LTAT | Malatya | Former 2nd TAF | 7th MJBC | Major base near Syrian border. | 38.43528 | 38.09083 |
| Erkilet Air Base | LTAU | Kayseri | TAF Logistics | 12th TMBC | Main tactical transport base. | 38.77028 | 35.49528 |
| Eskişehir Air Base | LTBI | Eskişehir | Former 1st TAF HQ | 1st MJBC | F-16 squadron + flight test unit. | 39.78389 | 30.58194 |
| Etimesgut Air Base | LTAD | Ankara | TAF Logistics HQ | 11th TMBC | CN-235 fleet hub + VIP/government aircraft. | 39.94983 | 32.68862 |
| Gaziemir Air Base | LTBK | İzmir | TAF Training HQ | part of 2nd MJBFTCC | HQ of Air Training Command. | 38.31911 | 27.15935 |
| İncirlik Air Base | LTAG | Adana | TAF Logistics | 10th TBC | KC-135 tanker wing. | 37.00194 | 35.42583 |
| Konya Air Base | LTAN | Konya | TAF Training | 3rd MJBC | Operational training + AEW. | 37.97900 | 32.56186 |
| Merzifon Air Base | LTAP | Amasya | Former 2nd TAF | 5th MJBC | F-16 squadrons in Northern Turkey. | 40.82917 | 35.52194 |
| Mürted Airfield Command | LTAE | Ankara | Former 1st TAF | 4th MJBC | Former F-16 OCU/OEU hub; downgraded. | 40.07889 | 32.56556 |
| Alemdağ Air Force Base | | | | | 15th Missile Wing | 41.05175 | 29.22595 |
| Batman Air Base | LTCJ | Batman | UAV Command | 14th UAV Wing | Unmanned aerial vehicle operations. | 37.93222 | 41.11639 |

Location of Turkish Air Force bases in Turkey
