= List of airports in Ankara =

List of airports in Ankara, this is a list of airports in Ankara, the capital of Turkey.

== List of airports ==
The list is sorted by the name of the community served, click the sort buttons in the table header to switch listing order.

Community	Airport name	Type	ICAO	IATA	Coordinates
Kahramankazan	Mürted Airfield Command	Military	LTAE		40°04′44″N 032°33′56″E
Esenboğa	Esenboğa International Airport	Public	LTAC	ESB	40°07′41″N 032°59′42″E
Etimesgut	Ankara Airport	Military/Public	LTAD	ANK	39°56′59.39″N 032°41′19.04″E
Etimesgut	Güvercinlik Army Air Base	Military	LTAB		39°56′05.82″N 32°44′26.79″E
Sincan	Based Education Army Air Base	Military	LT01		39.7389°N 32.3786°E
Gölbaşı	Polis Heliport Ufuk Danişmend	Military	LTHA/GBS		39°48′13″N 032°50′39″E

== See also ==
- List of airports in Turkey
