= Yozgat Airport =

Proposed airport in central Turkey

Yozgat Airport Yozgat Havalimanı
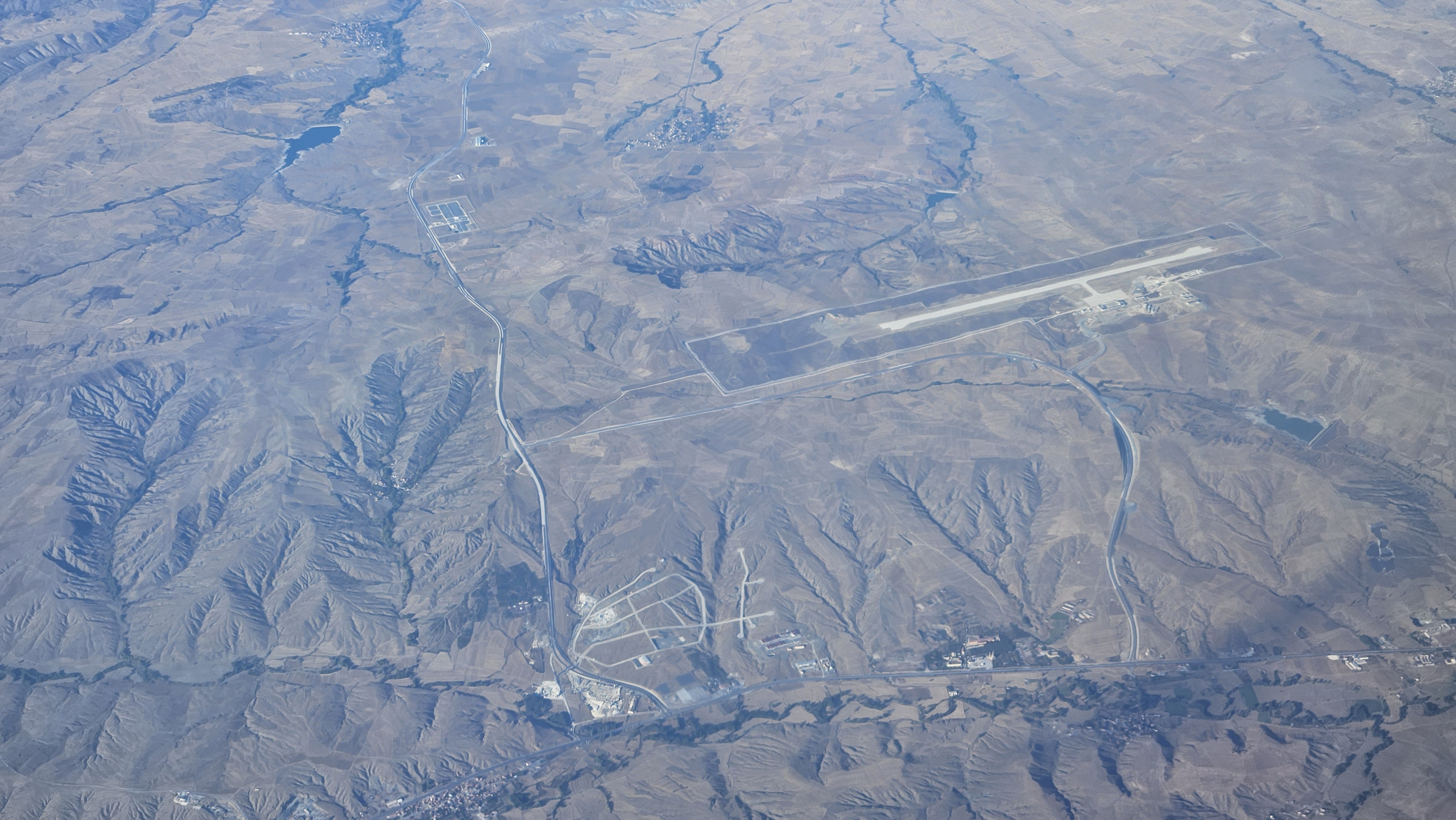
- IATA: ?; ICAO: ?

Summary
- Airport type: Public/Civil
- Owner: DHMI
- Operator: State Airports Administration (Turkish: Devlet Hava Meydanları İşletmesi (DHMİ))
- Serves: Yozgat, Turkey
- Location: Yozgat, Turkey
- Elevation AMSL: 1,335 m / 4,380 ft
- Coordinates: 39.8867°N 34.9906°E

Map

Runways
Direction	Length		Surface
Direction	m	ft	Surface
	3,500	11,482

Hattuşaş (Yozgat) Airport (IATA: ?, ICAO: ?) (Turkish: Yozgat Havalimanı) is an under-construction public airport around Deremumlu and Fakıbeyli in Yozgat Province, Turkey.

The airport location will be 15 km (9.3 mi) away from Yozgat town centre. The environmental impact report was published in June 2013.

The construction of the airport began on June 3rd, 2018
