= Fly Kıbrıs Airlines =

Flag carrier of Northern Cyprus

- Commenced operations: April 16, 2023
- Hubs: Ercan International Airport, Northern Cyprus
- Alliance: Freebird Airlines
- Fleet size: 2
- Destinations: 6
- Website: www.flykhy.com

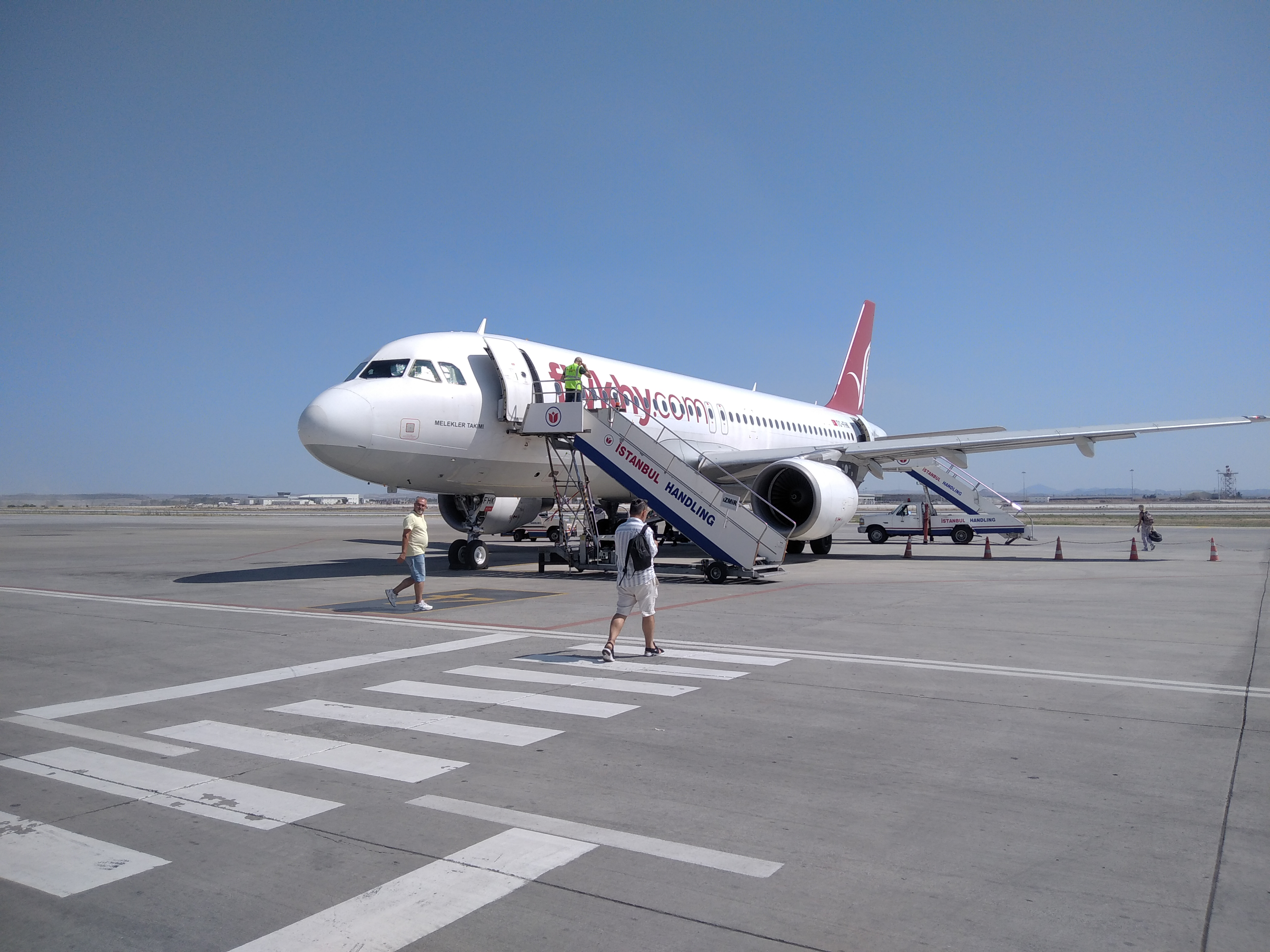
The Airbus A320 used on behalf of Fly Kıbrıs Airlines

Fly Kıbrıs Airlines (Turkish: Fly Kıbrıs Hava Yolları) or FLY KHY for short is a virtual airline that serves as the flag carrier of Northern Cyprus. It operates scheduled flights from Northern Cyprus. The airline made its first flight on April 16, 2023, and arranges flights operated by an Airbus A320-200 of Freebird Airlines and an Airbus A330-300 of Air Anka.

== History ==
On February 20, 2023, Minister of Public Works and Transport Erhan Arıklı announced that a new airline based in Northern Cyprus had been formed, and it will start its flights in April 2023. On March 13, 2023, the launch of Fly Kıbrıs Airlines took place at the new terminal building of Ercan International Airport. The airline's first flight was from Istanbul Airport to Ercan International Airport on April 16, 2023. It was announced that Baku and Tehran flights will begin on June 7, 2023, and Bodrum and Ordu flights will begin on June 14, 2023. Baku and Tehran flights have not begun. The airline has increased its fleet to 2 with a leased Airbus A330-300 from Air Anka on October 8, 2023.

== Destinations ==
As of October 9, 2023, Fly Kıbrıs Airlines flies to six destinations from Ercan International Airport.

City	Country	IATA	ICAO	Airport	Notes
Adana	Turkey	ADA	LTAF	Adana Şakirpaşa Airport	Airport Closed
Adana/Mersin	Turkey	COV	LTDB	Çukurova International Airport	
Ankara	Turkey	ESB	LTAC	Ankara Esenboğa Airport	
Antalya	Turkey	AYT	LTAI	Antalya Airport	
Istanbul	Turkey	IST	LTFM	Istanbul Airport	
İzmir	Turkey	ADB	LTBJ	İzmir Adnan Menderes Airport	
Muğla	Turkey	BJV	LTFE	Milas–Bodrum Airport	Seasonal
Nicosia	Northern Cyprus	ECN	LCEN	Ercan International Airport	Hub
Ordu	Turkey	OGU	LTCB	Ordu–Giresun Airport	Terminated
Trabzon	Turkey	TZX	LTCG	Trabzon Airport	Terminated

== Fleet ==
As of October 9, 2023, one Airbus A320-200 of Freebirds Airlines and one Airbus A330-300 of Air Anka are operating by these airlines on behalf of Fly Kıbrıs Airlines.

Aircraft	In service	Orders	Passengers			Notes
Aircraft	In service	Orders	C	Y	Total	Notes
Airbus A320-200	1	-				wet lease
Airbus A330-300	1	-				wet lease
Total	2	-				
