= Diyarbakır Airport =

Military airbase and public airport in Diyarbakır, Turkey

Diyarbakır Airport Diyarbakır Havalimanı
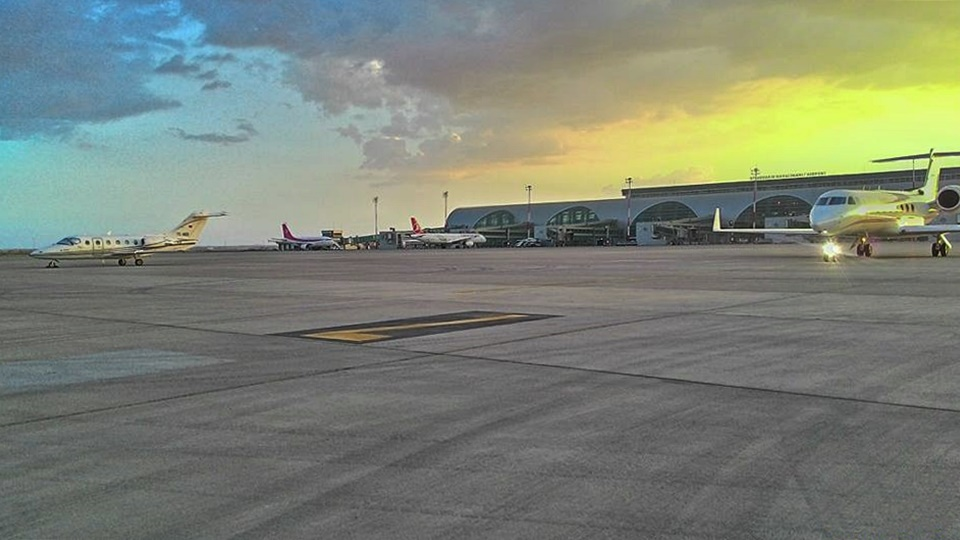
- IATA: DIY; ICAO: LTCC

Summary
- Airport type: Public/military
- Owner: Turkish Air Force
- Operator: DHMİ (State Airports Administration); 8th Air Wing, 2nd Air Force Command
- Serves: Diyarbakır, Turkey
- Location: Bağlar, Diyarbakır, Turkey
- Opened: 1952; 74 years ago
- Elevation AMSL: 686 m (2,251 ft)
- Coordinates: 37°53′38″N 040°12′03″E
- Website: www.dhmi.gov.tr

Map
- Location of airport in Turkey DIY (Asia)

Runways
Direction	Length		Surface
Direction	m	ft	Surface
16/34	3,549	11,644	Concrete

Statistics (2025)
- Annual passenger capacity: 5,000,000
- Passengers: 2,292,693
- Passenger change 2024–25: ▲7%
- Aircraft movements: 14,020
- Movements change 2024–25: ▲7%

Diyarbakır Airport (IATA: DIY, ICAO: LTCC) is a military airbase and public airport located in Diyarbakır, Turkey.

== Overview ==
Diyarbakır Airport is home to the 8th Air Wing (Ana Jet Üs or AJÜ) of the 2nd Air Force Command (Hava Kuvvet Komutanligi) of the Turkish Air Force (Türk Hava Kuvvetleri). Other wings of this command are located in Merzifon (LTAP), Malatya Erhaç (LTAT) and İncirlik (LTAG).

The airport was closed for renovation from 1 June to 1 September 2012. All air traffic was diverted to Batman, Mardin and Elazığ.

In 2012, an Armenian-American named Zuart Sudjian claimed that she held the land deed to the property of the airport and owned the right of its inheritance. She filed a lawsuit through her lawyer Ali Elbeyoğlu for the return of the lands. After a rejection by a local court, the case was taken to the Court of Cassation where the verdict is being appealed.

== Airlines and destinations ==
The following airlines operate regular scheduled and charter flights at Diyarbakır Airport:

Airlines	Destinations
AJet	Ankara, Bursa, Istanbul–Sabiha Gökçen, Trabzon; Seasonal: Skopje
Corendon Airlines	Seasonal: Hannover
Fly Kıbrıs Airlines	Ercan
Pegasus Airlines	Ankara, Cologne, Ercan, Istanbul–Sabiha Gökçen, Izmir
SunExpress	Antalya, Düsseldorf, Hannover, Izmir; Seasonal: Berlin, Frankfurt, Stuttgart
Turkish Airlines	Istanbul

== Traffic statistics ==
Diyarbakır Airport passenger traffic statistics
Year (months)	Domestic	% change	International	% change	Total	% change
2025	2,079,321	▲5%	213,372	▲25%	2,292,693	▲7%
2024	1,977,923	▲4%	170,958	▲28%	2,148,881	▲5%
2023	1,907,695	▲23%	133,052	▲9%	2,040,747	▲22%
2022	1,550,815	▲20%	121,562	▲116%	1,672,377	▲24%
2021	1,292,717	▲18%	56,407	▲141%	1,349,124	▲21%
2020	1,092,261	▼36%	23,381	▼69%	1,115,642	▼37%
2019	1,706,191	▼15%	76,045	▲43%	1,782,236	▼14%
2018	2,016,126	▲2%	53,180	▼28%	2,069,306	▲1%
2017	1,979,021	▲2%	74,181	▲125%	2,053,202	▲4%
2016	1,945,097	▼7%	32,920	▲118%	1,978,017	▼6%
2015	2,085,114	▲16%	15,087	▼7%	2,100,201	▲16%
2014	1,796,067	▲1%	16,141	▲2%	1,812,208	▲1%
2013	1,782,827	▲40%	15,826	▲4%	1,798.653	▲40%
2012	1,270,613	▼26%	15,211	▼20%	1,285,824	▼26%
2011	1,714,423	▲23%	18,951	▲31%	1,733,374	▲23%
2010	1,390,165	▲33%	14,425	▲25%	1,404,590	▲32%
2009	1,048,875	▲10%	11,506	▼34%	1,060,381	▲10%
2008	949,668	▲8%	17,420	▲21%	967,088	▲8%
2007	881,278	Steady	14,347	Steady	895,625	Steady

== Incidents ==
On January 8, 2003, Turkish Airlines Flight 634 crashed on approaching Diyarbakır Airport. 75 of the 80 passengers and crew on board were killed.

On August 27, 2016, several rockets were fired at the airport.
