= Kaklıç Air Base =

Kaklıç Air Base Kaklıç Hava Üssü
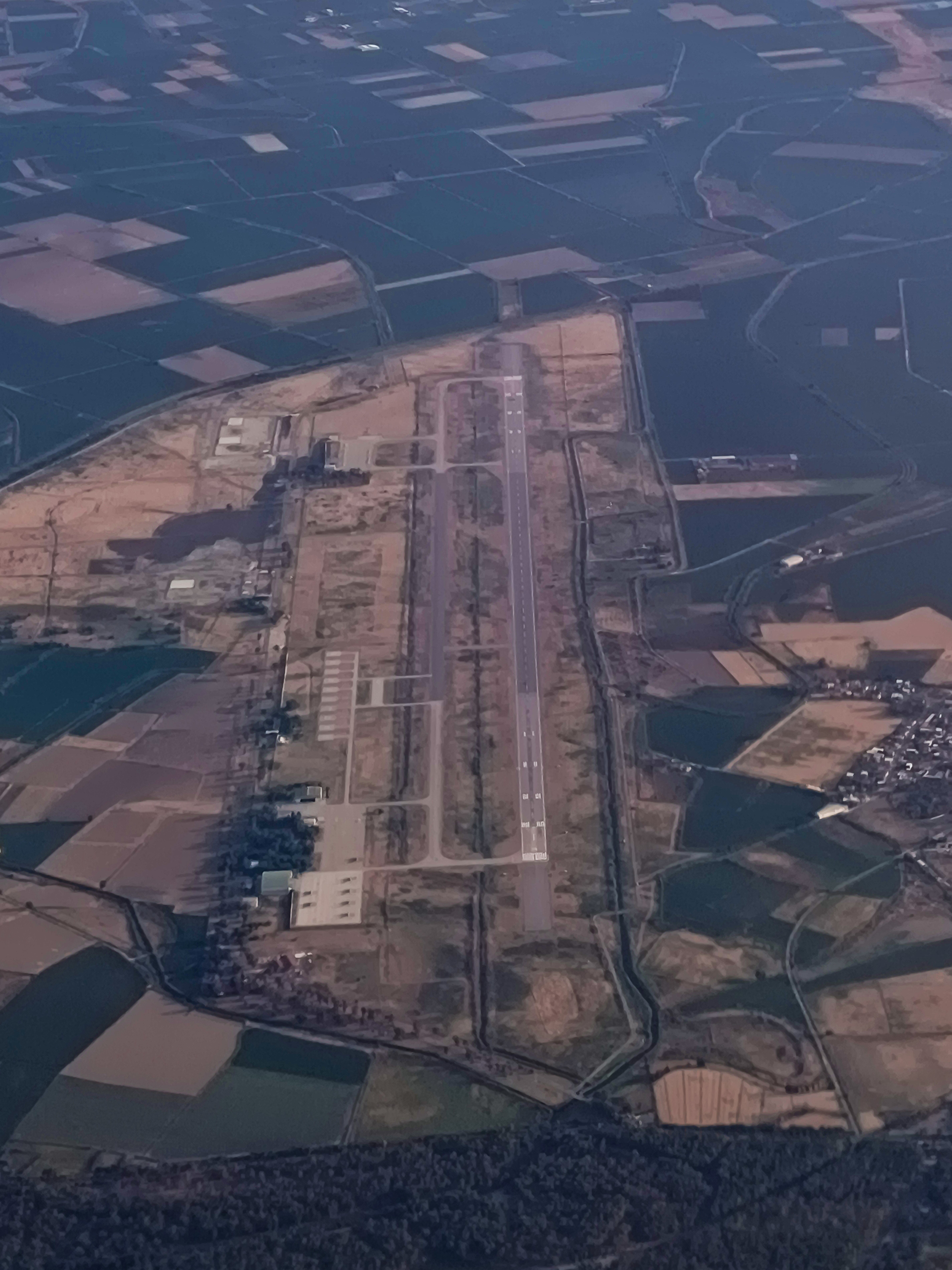
- Kaklıç Air Base, 2024
- IATA: none; ICAO: LTFA

Summary
- Airport type: Military
- Owner: Turkish Armed Forces
- Location: Çiğli, İzmir, Turkey
- Elevation AMSL: 13 ft / 4 m
- Interactive map of Kaklıç Air Base

Runways
Direction	Length		Surface
Direction	ft	m	Surface
17/35	9,836	2,998	Asphalt

Kaklıç Air Base (ICAO: LTFA) is an air base, owned by Turkish Air Force and located in Çiğli, İzmir. It is one of two air bases home to the 2nd Main Air Base Flight Education Center Command (the other being Çiğli Air Base). The air base lies 2 nautical miles (3.7 km) west of Çiğli Air Base.

== History ==
Air transport needs of İzmir was provided by Çiğli Air Base until 1987. However, the airfield was also used by the Air Force for pilot training and as a result the airport was transferred to the 2nd Main Air Base Command (2. Ana Jet Üssü Komutanlığı) and closed to civilian flights, for safety reasons. Under the instructions of Süleyman Demirel, then-Prime Minister of Turkey, a new civilian airport construction had started near Kaklıç village. However, the almost-finished airport was seized by the military in the aftermath of 1980 Turkish coup d'état, and the project was put on hold. Kaklıç Air Base had gradually switched into military use, as the site surrounding today's İzmir Adnan Menderes Airport was selected for building the new airport of İzmir.

== Military units ==
- 123rd Fleet (Palaz) - SF.260D & Super Mushshak
- 125th Fleet (Azman) - CN-235M-100 & UH-1H Iroquois
