= Zafer Airport =

Zafer Airport Zafer Havalimanı

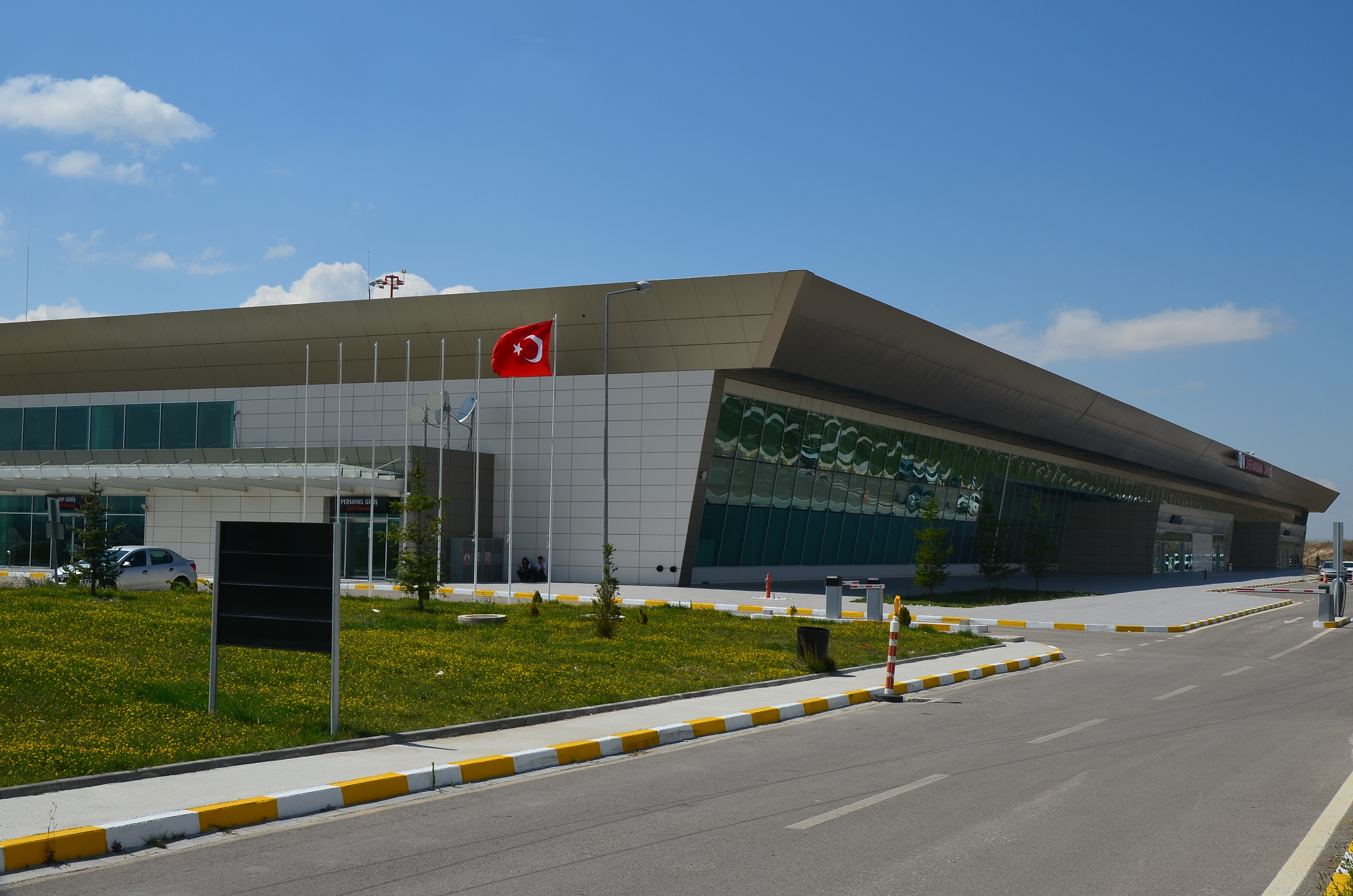
- IATA: KZR; ICAO: LTBZ

Summary
- Airport type: International
- Owner: DHMI
- Operator: IC İçtaş İnşaat Sanayi ve Ticaret A.Ş.
- Serves: Kütahya, Turkey
- Location: Altıntaş, Kütahya, Turkey
- Opened: 25 November 2012; 13 years ago
- Elevation AMSL: 3,322 ft (1,013 m)
- Coordinates: 39°06′41″N 30°07′48″E
- Website: zafer.aero

Map
- Location of airport in Turkey KZR (Europe)

Runways
| Direction | Length | | Surface |
| Direction | ft | m | Surface |
|---|---|---|---|
| 12/30 | 9,842 | 3,000 | Concrete |

Statistics (2025)
- Annual passenger capacity: 2,000,000
- Passengers: 78,819
- Passenger change 2024–25: ▲18%
- Aircraft movements: 13,870
- Movements change 2024–25: ▲26%

Zafer Airport (IATA: KZR, ICAO: LTBZ) (Turkish: Zafer Havalimanı) is an international regional airport that serves the cities of Kütahya, Afyonkarahisar and Uşak in Turkey. The airport opened on 25 November 2012.

== Location ==
Zafer Airport is located in the Kuyucak village of Altıntaş district 41 km (25 mi) south-southeast of Kütahya. It is 59 km (37 mi) away from Afyonkarahisar, 103 km (64 mi) to Uşak and 113 km (70 mi) to Eskişehir. Despite serving multiple districts, some have criticized the airport's location.

== Facilities ==
The airport's groundbreaking took place on 22 April 2011. As Turkey's first regional airport, it was constructed by IC İçtaş Construction Company in 18 months and financed in the build–operate–transfer form. It cost ₺155 million (approx. US$91 million) and will be operated until 2044 by the IC Holding. The facility with a total covered area of 27,000 m^{2} (290,000 sq ft) is built on 370 ha (910 acres) land.

=== Terminal ===
The only one terminal building of 17,600 m^{2} (189,000 sq ft) covered area is designed for domestic as well as for international passenger service. The building has 19 check-in counters and four gates. International passengers are handled at eight border checkpoints. There are four baggage carousels at the arrival hall. Zafer airport's annual capacity is planned to be two million passengers. The parking lot is capable of holding 87 cars and eight busses.

=== Runway ===
The airport's runway is 3,000 m (9,800 ft) long and 45 m (148 ft) wide. The airport ramp allows parking of five aircraft at the same time.

== Airlines and destinations ==
The following airlines operate regular scheduled and charter flights at Zafer Airport:

| Airlines | Destinations |
|---|---|
| Eurowings | Seasonal: Düsseldorf |
| SunExpress | Seasonal: Düsseldorf |
| Turkish Airlines | Istanbul |

== Statistics ==
Kütahya–Zafer Airport passenger traffic statistics
| Year (months) | Domestic | % change | International | % change | Total | % change |
|---|---|---|---|---|---|---|
| 2025 | 39,230 | ▲3% | 39,589 | ▲37% | 78,819 | ▲18% |
| 2024 | 37,911 | ▲3% | 28,824 | ▼41% | 66,735 | ▼22% |
| 2023 | 36,986 | ▲29% | 48,776 | ▲72% | 85,762 | ▲50% |
| 2022 | 28,723 | ▲54% | 28,374 | ▲558% | 57,097 | ▲149% |
| 2021 | 18,615 | ▲94% | 4,314 | ▼39% | 22,929 | ▲38% |
| 2020 | 9,605 | ▼83% | 7,040 | ▼71% | 16,645 | ▼80% |
| 2019 | 57,741 | ▼20% | 24,285 | ▼10% | 82,026 | ▼17% |
| 2018 | 72,427 | ▼12% | 26,968 | ▲26% | 99,395 | ▼4% |
| 2017 | 81,941 | ▲22% | 21,423 | ▲10% | 103,364 | ▲19% |
| 2016 | 67,281 | ▼5% | 19,452 | ▼17% | 86,733 | ▼8% |
| 2015 | 70,570 | ▲6% | 23,304 | ▼11% | 93,874 | ▲8% |
| 2014 | 60,303 | ▼6% | 26,274 | ▲26% | 86,557 | ▲2% |
| 2013 | 63,872 | ▲1908% | 20,902 | - | 84,774 | ▲2565% |
| 2012 | 3,181 | Steady | - | Steady | 3,181 | Steady |

^1: 2012 statistics correspond to the last 2 months of 2012 since the opening of the airport.

== Ground Transportation ==
There is an ad-hoc minibus service between central Kütahya and Zafer airport timed for commercial passenger flights. Taxis are also available at the airport.

== See also ==
- Uşak Airport
