= Yenişehir Airport =

Bursa Yenişehir Airport Bursa Yenişehir Havalimanı
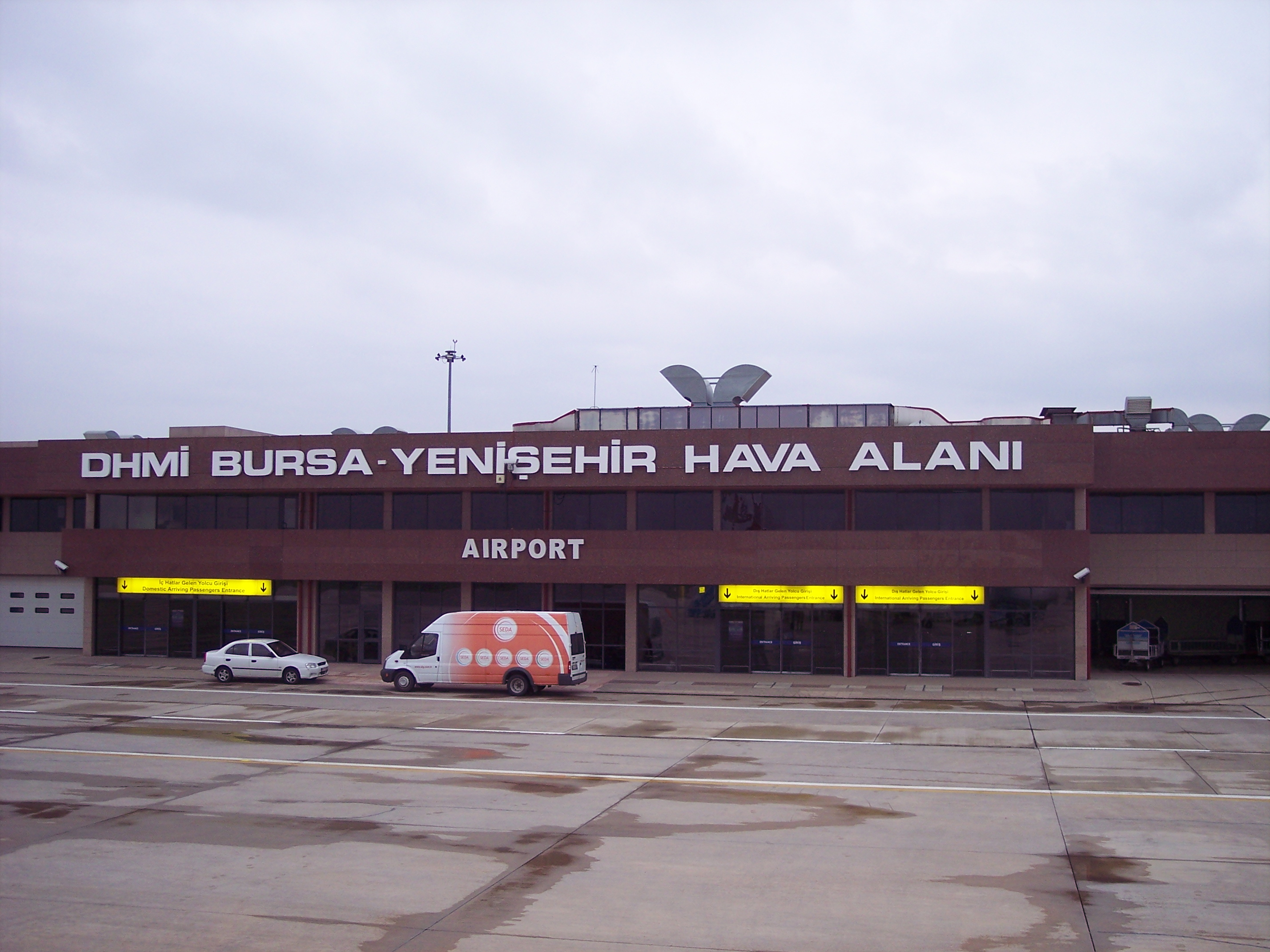
- IATA: YEI; ICAO: LTBR

Summary
- Airport type: Public / military
- Serves: Bursa, Turkey
- Location: Yenişehir, Bursa, Turkey
- Opened: 3 November 2000; 25 years ago
- Elevation AMSL: 764 ft (233 m)
- Coordinates: 40°15′18″N 029°33′45″E
- Website: www.dhmi.gov.tr

Map
- Location of airport in Turkey

Runways
Direction	Length		Surface
Direction	ft	m	Surface
07R/25L	9,818	2,993	Concrete
07L/25R	9,818	2,993	Concrete

Statistics (2025)
- Annual passenger capacity: 2,250,000
- Passengers: 246,543
- Passenger change 2024–25: ▲23%
- Aircraft movements: 28,220
- Movements change 2024–25: ▲55%

Yenişehir Airport (IATA: YEI, ICAO: LTBR) is an international airport in the city of Yenişehir in the Bursa Province of Turkey.

The Yenişehir Airport YHT railway station of the Osmaneli-Bursa-Bandırma high-speed rail line will serve the airport.

== Airlines and destinations ==
The following airlines operate regular scheduled and charter flights at Burşa Yenişehir Airport:

Airlines	Destinations
AJet	Diyarbakır, Erzurum, Muş, Trabzon
SunExpress	Adana/Mersin, Antalya, Düsseldorf; Seasonal: Stuttgart

== Traffic Statistics ==
Bursa–Yenişehir Airport passenger traffic statistics
Year (months)	Domestic	% change	International	% change	Total	% change
2025	193,997	▲9%	52,546	▲136%	246,543	▲23%
2024	178,401	▲3%	22,286	▲3%	200,687	▲3%
2023	173,289	▲76%	21,621	▲57%	194,910	▲73%
2022	98,735	▲29%	13,729	▲3503%	112,464	▲46%
2021	76,733	▲50%	381	▼96%	77,114	▲27%
2020	51,092	▼80%	9,479	▼43%	60,571	▼77%
2019	252,269	▲13%	16,722	▼10%	268,991	▲11%
2018	224,023	▼1%	18,548	▼25%	242,571	▼3%
2017	226,456	▼10%	24,691	▲4%	251,147	▼9%
2016	251,227	▲58%	23,664	▼17%	274,891	▲47%
2015	158,957	▲265%	28,560	▼7%	187,517	▲153%
2014	43,494	▼1%	30,614	▲32%	74,108	▲11%
2013	43,818	▼19%	23,111	▼10%	66,929	▼16%
2012	54,161	▼20%	25,595	▼42%	79,756	▼29%
2011	67,410	▲6%	44,140	▲31%	111,550	▲14%
2010	63,824	▲6%	33,710	▲154%	97,534	▲33%
2009	60,219	▼7%	13,277	▲25%	73,496	▼3%
2008	64,902	▲63%	10,560	▼12%	75,462	▲46%
2007	39,702	Steady	12,022	Steady	51,724	Steady
