= Gaziemir Air Base =

Gaziemir Air Base Gaziemir Hava Üssü
- IATA: none; ICAO: LTBK

Summary
- Airport type: Military
- Owner: Turkish Air Force
- Operator: Air Force Training Command
- Location: İzmir, Turkey
- Elevation AMSL: 132 m / 433 ft
- Coordinates: 38°19′08.78″N 27°09′33.67″E

Map
- Location of airport in Turkey

Runways
Direction	Length		Surface
Direction	m	ft	Surface
17/35	1,357	4,453	Asphalt
- Source: DAFIF

Gaziemir Air Base (Turkish: Gaziemir Hava Üssü, ICAO: LTBK) is an airbase of the Turkish Air Force 10 km (6.2 mi) south of İzmir, Turkey. It is owned by the Turkish Air Force and operated by the Air Force Training Command.

The airport is at an elevation of 132 m (433 ft) above mean sea level. It has one runway in north–south direction, designated 17/35, with an asphalt surface measuring 1,357 m (4,452 ft).

The air base is the headquarters of the Air Force Training Command and hosts the training wing's 203rd Search and Rescue Squadron (Ege) with its CASA CN-235M-100 aircraft.

The foreign-language school (Turkish: Hava Lisan Okulu Komutanlığı) of the Air Force is at the Gaziemir Air Base.
