= Bingöl Airport =

Bingöl Airport Bingöl Havalimanı
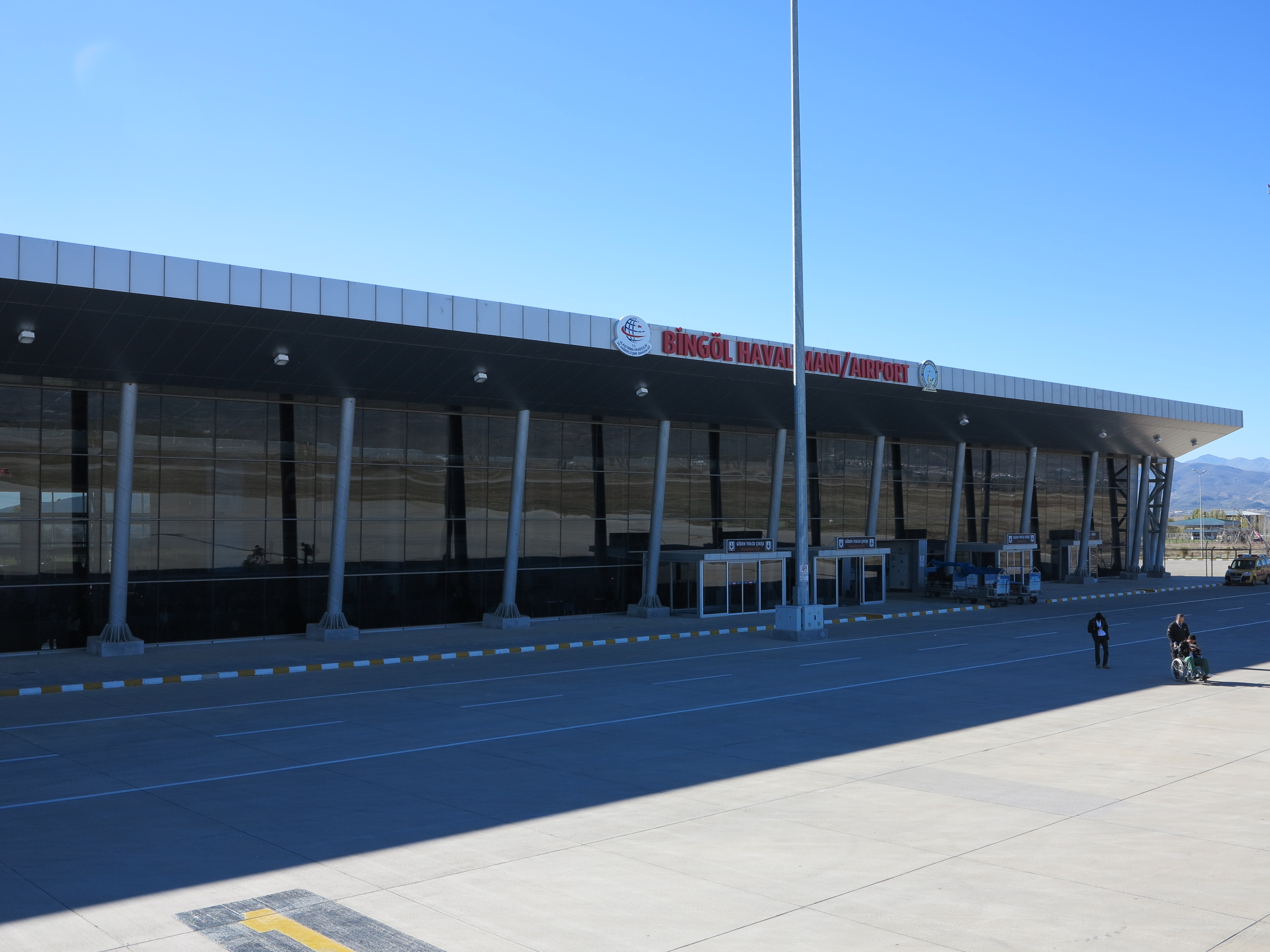
- IATA: BGG; ICAO: LTCU

Summary
- Airport type: Public
- Operator: General Directorate of State Airports Authority
- Serves: Bingöl, Turkey
- Location: Bingöl, Turkey
- Opened: 12 July 2013; 12 years ago
- Elevation AMSL: 3,490 ft / 1,063 m
- Coordinates: 38°51′40″N 40°35′33″E
- Website: www.dhmi.gov.tr

Map
- Location of airport in Turkey

Runways
Direction	Length		Surface
Direction	ft	m	Surface
12/30	7,545	2,300	Concrete

Statistics (2025)
- Annual passenger capacity: 1,000,000
- Passengers: 190,268
- Passenger change 2024–25: ▲5%
- Aircraft movements: 1,432
- Movements change 2024–25: ▲5%

Bingöl Airport (IATA: BGG, ICAO: LTCU) is an airport located in Çeltiksuyu, 20 km away to the south-east of the city of Bingöl, in the Bingöl Province of Turkey. It was inaugurated in July 2013 by prime minister Recep Tayyip Erdoğan. It has a passenger capacity of 500'000 a year.

== Airlines and destinations ==
The following airlines operate regular scheduled and charter flights at Bingöl Airport:

Airlines	Destinations
AJet	Ankara
Pegasus Airlines	Istanbul–Sabiha Gökçen
Turkish Airlines	Istanbul

== Traffic Statistics ==
Bingöl Airport passenger traffic statistics
Year (months)	Domestic	% change	International	% change	Total	% change
2025	188,678	▲5%	1,590	▲52%	190,268	▲5%
2024	179,608	▲5%	1,043	▲461%	180,651	▲6%
2023	170,333	▲27%	186	-	170,519	▲27%
2022	133,879	▼12%	-	-	133,879	▼12%
2021	152,967	▲26%	-	▼100%	152,967	▲26%
2020	121,111	▼40%	271	▼52%	121,382	▼40%
2019	202,753	▼10%	560	▼27%	203,313	▼10%
2018	224,708	▲34%	769	▼30%	225,477	▲34%
2017	167,127	▲7%	1,093	▲250%	168,220	▲7%
2016	156,603	▲15%	312	-	156,915	▲15%
2015	135,864	▲10%	-	-	135,864	▲10%
2014	123,782	▲320%	-	-	123,782	▲320%
2013	29,443	Steady	-	Steady	29,443	Steady

^1: 2013 statistics correspond to the last 6 months of 2013 since the opening of the airport.
