= Çanakkale Airport =

Çanakkale Airport Çanakkale Havalimanı
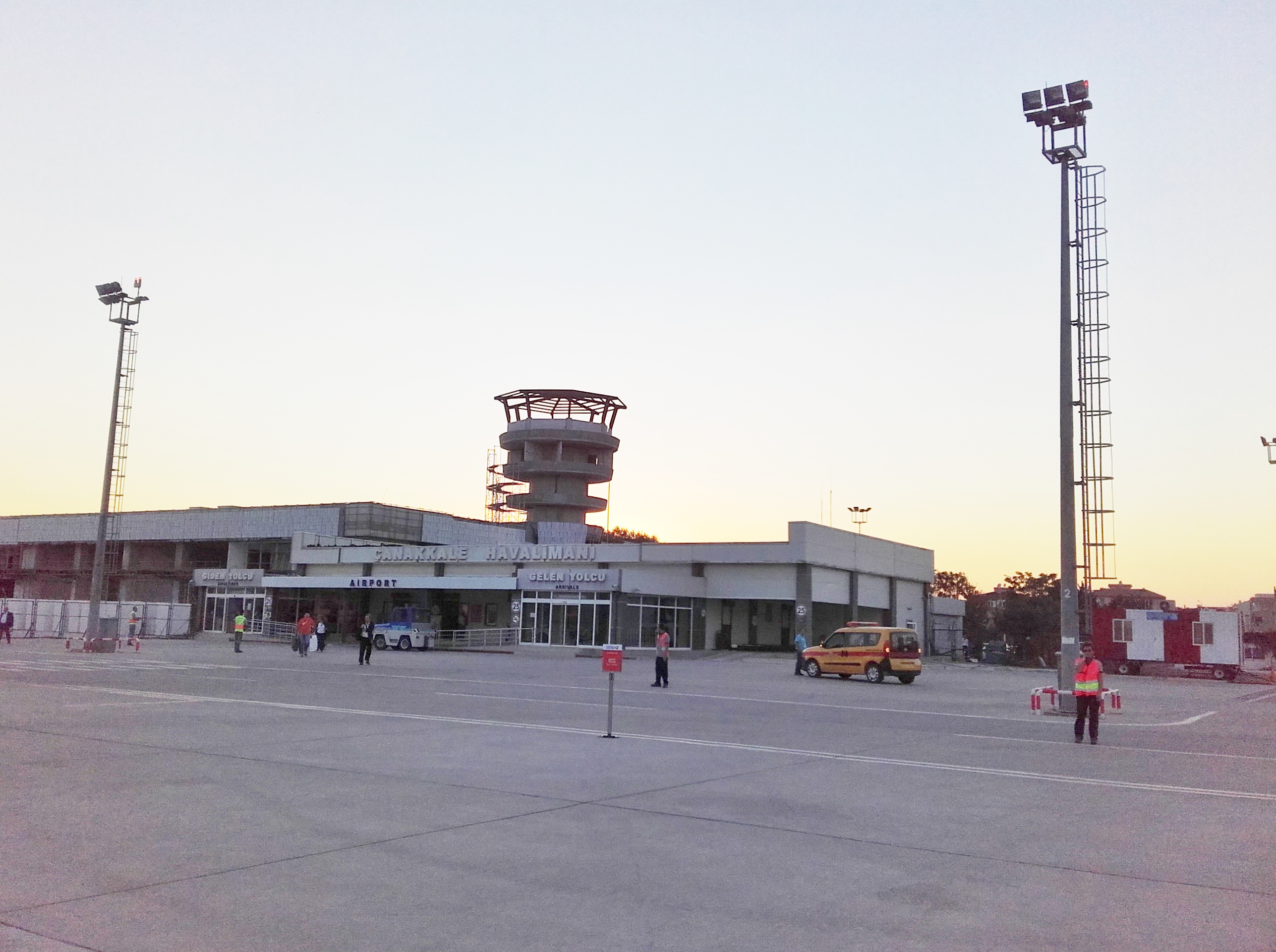
- IATA: CKZ; ICAO: LTBH

Summary
- Airport type: Public
- Operator: General Directorate of State Airports Authority
- Serves: Çanakkale, Turkey
- Location: Çanakkale, Turkey
- Opened: 1995; 31 years ago
- Elevation AMSL: 7 m / 23 ft
- Coordinates: 40°08′15.80″N 026°25′36.40″E
- Website: www.dhmi.gov.tr

Map
- Location of airport in Turkey CKZ (Europe)

Runways
Direction	Length		Surface
Direction	m	ft	Surface
04/22	2,350	7,709	Concrete

Statistics (2025)
- Annual passenger capacity: 2,000,000
- Passengers: 192,434
- Passenger change 2024–25: ▲3%
- Aircraft movements: 6,680
- Movements change 2024–25: ▲14%

Çanakkale Airport (IATA: CKZ, ICAO: LTBH) is an airport in the city of Çanakkale, Turkey.

== History ==
Total passenger traffic was 18,423 in 2009. The busiest days at the airport are 18 March and 25 April every year, both significant dates in Turkish history related to the Ottoman Empire's involvement in the Gallipoli Campaign of World War I; 18 March is the anniversary of World War I defeat of the allied attempt to force the Dardanelles; and 25 April is Anzac Day.

== Facilities ==
The airport has one runway, oriented in the 04-22 direction and with dimensions of 2350x45m.

== Airlines and destinations ==
The following airlines operate regular scheduled and charter flights at Çanakkale Airport:

Airlines	Destinations
AJet	Ankara

== Traffic Statistics ==
Çanakkale Airport passenger traffic statistics
Year (months)	Domestic	% change	International	% change	Total	% change
2025	187,623	▲1%	4,811	▲144%	192,434	▲3%
2024	185,663	▲9%	1,968	▼18%	187,631	▲9%
2023	169,923	▲12%	2,399	▲246%	172,322	▲13%
2022	151,914	▲92%	693	-	152,607	▲93%
2021	79,145	▼17%	-	▼100%	79,145	▼18%
2020	95,278	▼25%	1,286	▼69%	96,564	▼26%
2019	127,080	▼42%	4,160	▼62%	131,240	▼43%
2018	218,578	▲7%	10,829	▼18%	229,407	▲5%
2017	204,789	▲13%	13,266	▲325%	218,055	▲19%
2016	180,839	▲8%	3,119	▲538%	183,958	▲9%
2015	167,628	▲286%	489	▲36%	168,117	▲284%
2014	43,446	▼462%	359	-	43,805	▲466%
2013	7,737	▼84%	-	-	7,737	▼84%
2012	49,240	▼19%	-	-	49,240	▼19%
2011	60,543	▲151%	-	▼100%	60,543	▲150%
2010	24,160	▲26%	18	-	24,178	▲26%
2009	19,207	▼3%	-	▼100%	19,207	▼10%
2008	19,786	▼51%	1,473	▲307%	21,259	▼48%
2007	40,717	Steady	362	Steady	41,079	Steady
