= Sinop Airport =

Sinop Airport Sinop Havalimanı
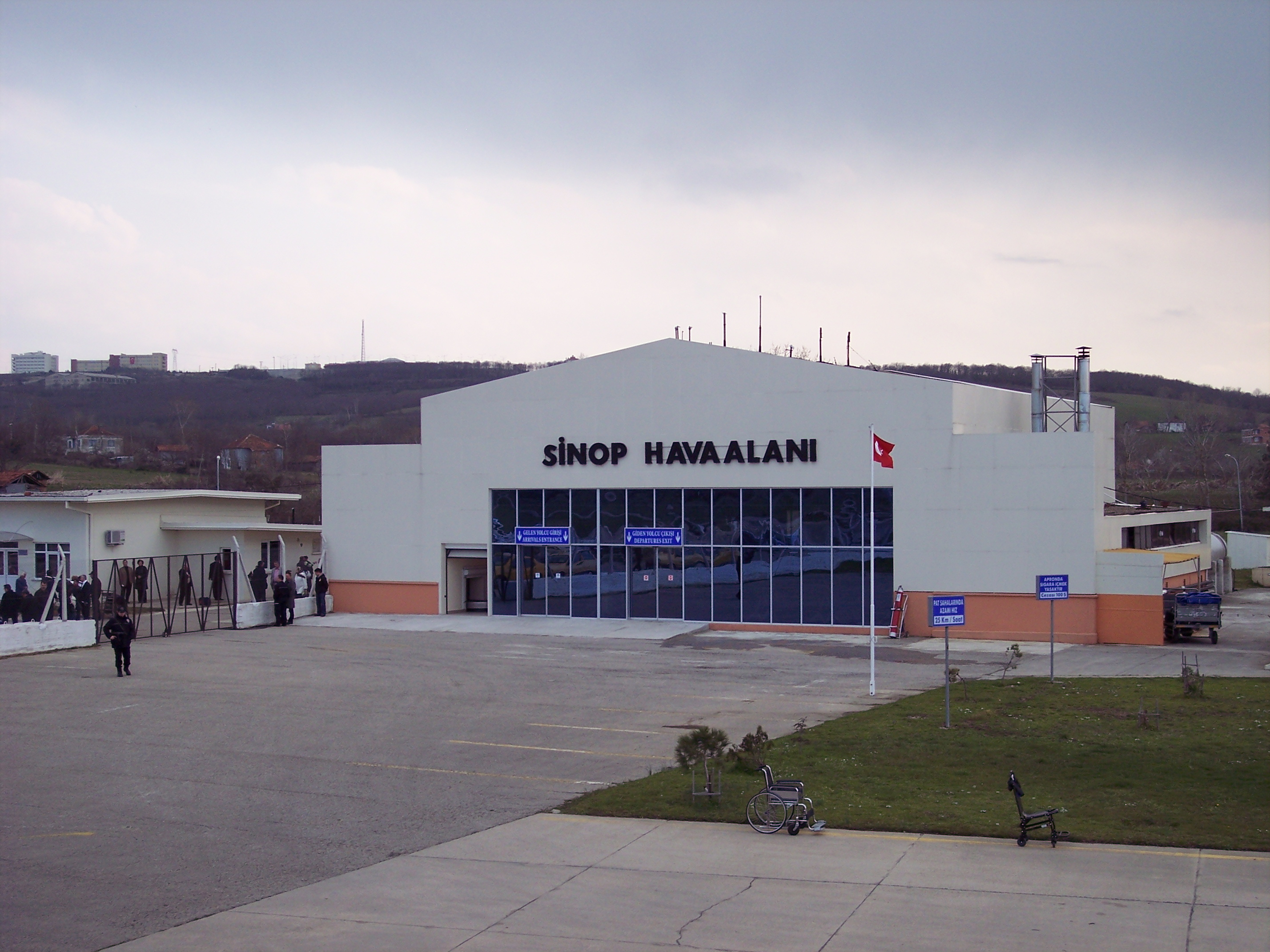
- IATA: NOP; ICAO: LTCM

Summary
- Airport type: Public
- Operator: General Directorate of State Airports Authority
- Serves: Sinop, Turkey
- Location: Sinop, Turkey
- Opened: 1993; 33 years ago
- Coordinates: 42°00′57″N 035°03′59″E
- Website: www.dhmi.gov.tr

Map
- Location of the airport in Turkey

Runways
Direction	Length		Surface
Direction	m	ft	Surface
05/23	1,980	6,496	Concrete

Statistics (2025)
- Annual passenger capacity: 2,000,000
- Passengers: 116,483
- Passenger change 2024–25: ▲26%
- Aircraft movements: 1,160
- Movements change 2024–25: ▲22%

Sinop Airport (IATA: NOP, ICAO: LTCM) is an airport in Sinop, in the Black Sea Region of Turkey. Turkish Airlines has daily flights from Istanbul. Tower and approach frequency is 126.300 MHz. The old runway of the airport was previously used by the US military base in Sinop. The IATA code has changed from ~~SIC~~ to NOP.

== Airlines and destinations ==
The following airlines operate regular scheduled and charter flights at Sinop Airport:

Airlines	Destinations
Pegasus Airlines	Istanbul–Sabiha Gökçen
Turkish Airlines	Istanbul

== Traffic Statistics ==
Sinop Airport passenger traffic statistics
Year (months)	Domestic	% change	International	% change	Total	% change
2025	115,578	▲26%	905	▲101%	116,483	▲26%
2024	91,634	▼3%	450	▲43%	92,084	▼3%
2023	94,697	▲35%	314	-	95,011	▲35%
2022	70,246	▼6%	-	-	70,246	▼6%
2021	74,463	▼5%	-	-	74,463	▼5%
2020	78,028	▼43%	-	▼100%	78,028	▼43%
2019	136,862	▼23%	319	▼40%	137,181	▼23%
2018	178,653	▲17%	530	▲4%	179,183	▲17%
2017	152,558	▲70%	512	▼67%	153,070	▲68%
2016	89,678	▼2%	1,537	▲197%	91,215	▼1%
2015	91,894	▲13%	517	-	92,411	▲13%
2014	81,497	-	-	-	81,497	-
2013	-	▼100%	-	-	-	▼100%
2012	67,404	▲15%	-	-	67,404	▲15%
2011	58,438	▲2%	-	-	58,438	▲2%
2010	57,454	▲22%	-	-	57,454	▲22%
2009	47,147	▲226%	-	-	47,147	▲226%
2008	14,464	Steady	-	Steady	14,464	Steady
