= Şırnak Şerafettin Elçi Airport =

Şırnak Şerafettin Elçi Airport Şırnak Şerafettin Elçi Havalimanı
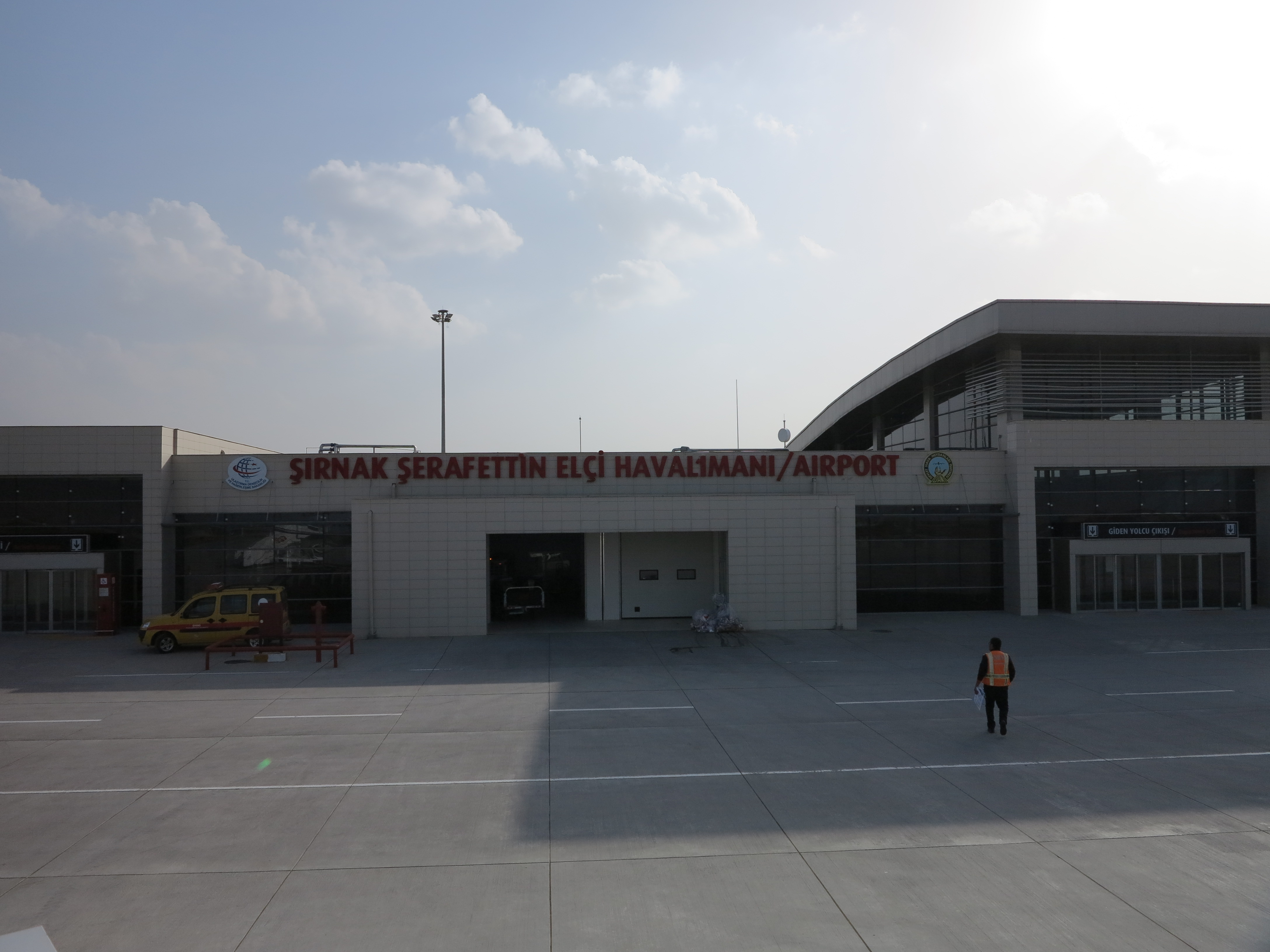
- IATA: NKT; ICAO: LTCV

Summary
- Airport type: Public
- Operator: General Directorate of State Airports Authority
- Serves: Şırnak, Turkey
- Location: Cizre, Şırnak, Turkey
- Opened: 26 July 2013; 12 years ago
- Elevation AMSL: 2,038 ft / 621 m
- Coordinates: 37°21′50″N 42°03′36″E
- Website: www.dhmi.gov.tr

Map
- Location of airport in Turkey

Runways
Direction	Length		Surface
Direction	ft	m	Surface
11/29	9,842	3,000	Concrete

Statistics (2025)
- Annual passenger capacity: 1,000,000
- Passengers: 421,160
- Passenger change 2024–25: ▲1%
- Aircraft movements: 7,158
- Movements change 2024–25: ▼9%

Şırnak Şerafettin Elçi Airport (IATA: NKT, ICAO: LTCV) (Turkish: Şırnak Şerafettin Elçi Havalimanı) is a public airport near Cizre, a town in Şırnak Province, Turkey. The airport was opened to public/civil air traffic on 26.July.2013, the airport is 60 km (37 mi) away from Şırnak town centre. It is named in honor of native politician Şerafettin Elçi (1938-2012).

== Airlines and destinations ==
The following airlines operate regular scheduled and charter flights at Şırnak Airport:

Airlines	Destinations
AJet	Ankara, Istanbul–Sabiha Gökcen
Turkish Airlines	Istanbul

== Traffic statistics ==
Şırnak–Şerafettin Elçi Airport passenger traffic statistics
Year (months)	Domestic	% change	International	% change	Total	% change
2025	420,516	▲1%	644	-	421,160	▲1%
2024	417,488	▲4%	-	-	417,488	▲4%
2023	401,663	▲42%	-	-	401,663	▲42%
2022	282,798	▼10%	-	-	282,798	▼10%
2021	312,973	▲38%	-	▼100%	312,973	▲38%
2020	227,169	▼38%	117	-	227,286	▼38%
2019	365,865	▼14%	-	-	365,865	▼14%
2018	425,345	▲25%	-	▼100%	425,345	▲25%
2017	339,725	▲41%	116	-	339,841	▲41%
2016	241,311	▼12%	-	▼100%	241,311	▼12%
2015	273,396	▲8%	71	-	273,467	▲8%
2014	254,254	▲551%	-	-	254,254	▲551%
2013	39,074	Steady	-	Steady	39,074	Steady

^1: 2013 statistics correspond to the last 6 months of 2013 since the opening of the airport.
