= Şanlıurfa Airport =

Şanlıurfa Airport Şanlıurfa Havalimanı
- IATA: SFQ; ICAO: LTCH

Summary
- Airport type: Defunct
- Serves: Şanlıurfa, Turkey
- Location: Şanlıurfa Province, Turkey
- Elevation AMSL: 452 m / 1,483 ft
- Coordinates: 37°05′39″N 038°50′49″E

Map
- Location of airport in Turkey

Runways
Direction	Length		Surface
Direction	m	ft	Surface
15/33	2,165	7,103	Asphalt
- Source: DAFIF, iata.org, skyvector.com

Şanlıurfa Airport (IATA: SFQ, ICAO: LTCH) was an airport in Şanlıurfa Province, Turkey. It was located 9 km (5.6 mi) south of the city of Şanlıurfa (commonly called "Urfa"). It was closed the 17 June 2007 after the opening of the newly built Şanlıurfa GAP Airport (IATA: GNY, ICAO: LTCS), about 34 km (21 mi) northeast of the city.
