= Kütahya Air Base =

Kütahya Air Base Kütahya Hava Üssü
- IATA: none; ICAO: LTBN

Summary
- Airport type: Military
- Owner: Turkish Air Force
- Location: Kütahya, Turkey
- Elevation AMSL: 3,026 ft (922 m)
- Coordinates: 39°25′36″N 30°01′00″E

Map
- Location of the air base in Turkey LTBN (NATO)

Runways
Direction	Length		Surface
Direction	ft	m	Surface
15/33	4,950	1,509	Asphalt
- Source: DAFIF

Kütahya Air Base (Turkish: Kütahya Hava Üssü) (ICAO: LTBN) is a military airport of the Turkish Air Force located in Kütahya, Turkey. The airport operates as primarily as a military air base but also accepts civilian passenger flights.

== Facilities ==
The airport resides at an elevation of 3,026 feet (922 m) above mean sea level. It has one runway designated 16/34 with an asphalt surface measuring 1,509 by 40 metres (4,951 ft × 131 ft).
