= Şanlıurfa GAP Airport =

Şanlıurfa GAP Airport Şanlıurfa GAP Havalimanı
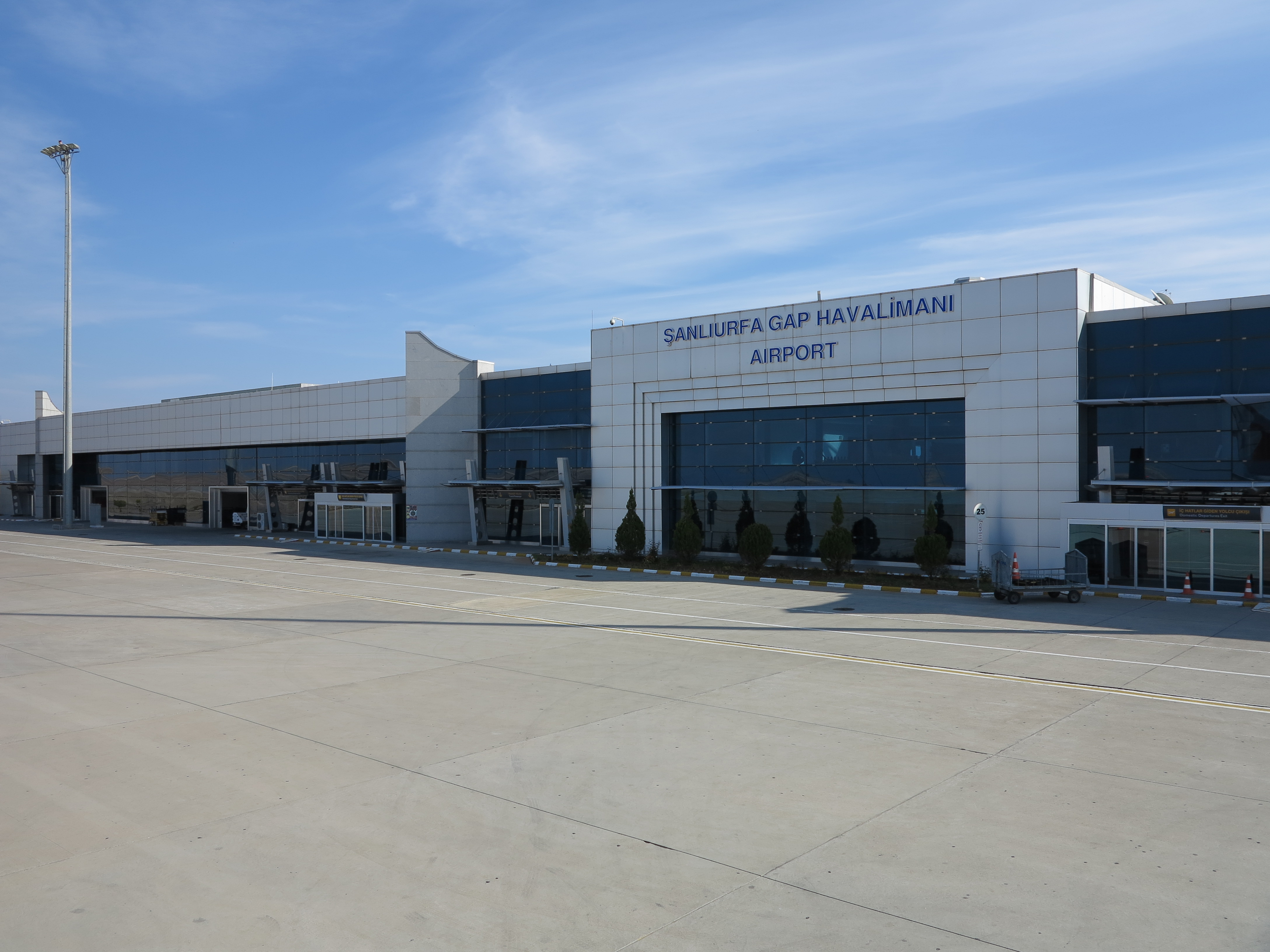
- IATA: GNY; ICAO: LTCS

Summary
- Airport type: Public
- Operator: General Directorate of State Airports Authority
- Serves: Şanlıurfa, Turkey
- Location: Karaköprü, Şanlıurfa, Turkey
- Opened: 16 July 2007; 19 years ago
- Elevation AMSL: 823 m (2,700 ft)
- Coordinates: 37°27′N 38°54′E
- Website: www.dhmi.gov.tr

Map
- Location of airport in Turkey

Runways
Direction	Length		Surface
Direction	m	ft	Surface
04/22	4,000	13,123	Asphalt

Statistics (2025)
- Annual passenger capacity: 2,000,000
- Passengers: 1,059,953
- Passenger change 2024–25: ▲15%
- Aircraft movements: 9,888
- Movements change 2024–25: ▲13%

Şanlıurfa GAP Airport (IATA: GNY, ICAO: LTCS) is an airport located in Şanlıurfa Province, Turkey. It is located about 18.3 nautical miles (33.9 km; 21.1 mi) northeast of the city centre of Şanlıurfa.

The airport is part of the Southeastern Anatolia Project (Turkish: Güneydoğu Anadolu Projesi, known as "GAP"), a regional development project in the area of the Atatürk Dam. The new airport is known as the "GAP airport" because it is designed to service the workers in the GAP project as well as the city of Şanlıurfa. Opened the 17 June 2007, it replaced the old Şanlıurfa Airport (IATA: SFQ, ICAO: LTCH), which was located 9 km (5.6 mi) south of the city.

The airport facilities include cafes, car hire offices, and airline ticket offices, but almost all facilities, including even the taxi rank, are staffed only when flights are due.

== Airlines and destinations ==
The following airlines operate regular scheduled and charter flights at Şanlıurfa Airport:

Airlines	Destinations
AJet	Ankara, Istanbul–Sabiha Gökçen
Pegasus Airlines	Istanbul–Sabiha Gökçen, Izmir
SunExpress	Antalya, Izmir
Turkish Airlines	Istanbul

== Ground transportation ==
Havaş operates shuttle buses from and to the airport to the city centre and to Siverek.

== Traffic Statistics ==
Şanlıurfa–GAP Airport Passenger Traffic Statistics
Year (months)	Domestic	% change	International	% change	Total	% change
2025	1,032,515	▲14%	27,438	▲57%	1,059,953	▲15%
2024	906,720	▲14%	17,437	▼17%	924,157	▲13%
2023	793,535	▲25%	20,943	▲272%	814,478	▲27%
2022	635,945	▲15%	5,635	▲1810%	641,580	▲16%
2021	554,892	▲38%	295	▼96%	555,187	▲36%
2020	400,665	▼44%	6,866	▼51%	407,531	▼44%
2019	715,853	▼15%	14,094	▼28%	729,947	▼15%
2018	837,286	▲2%	19,479	▲2%	856,765	▲2%
2017	821,647	▲9%	19,122	▼13%	840,769	▲8%
2016	755,923	▲12%	22,081	▲7%	778,004	▲11%
2015	677,109	▲16%	20,718	▲131%	697,827	▲18%
2014	583,963	▲10%	8,981	▼31%	592,944	▲9%
2013	532,580	▲60%	13,047	▼13%	545,627	▲57%
2012	332,306	▲48%	15,020	▲126%	347,326	▲50%
2011	224,677	▲4%	6,646	▲37%	231,323	▲5%
2010	216,192	▲21%	4,842	▲61%	221,034	▲22%
2009	178,144	▲18%	3,011	▼16%	181,155	▲17%
2008	151,074	▲33%	3,583	▲158%	154,657	▲35%
2007	113,291	Steady	1,390	Steady	114,681	Steady

^1: 2007 statistics correspond to the last 6 months of 2007 since the opening of the airport.
