= Cengiz Topel Naval Air Station =

Cengiz Topel Airport Cengiz Topel Havalimanı
- IATA: KCO; ICAO: LTBQ

Summary
- Airport type: Military and public
- Owner: Turkish Navy
- Operator: DHMI
- Serves: Kocaeli, Turkey
- Location: Kartepe, Kocaeli, Turkey
- Opened: 1976; 50 years ago
- In use: Active
- Elevation AMSL: 182 ft / 55 m
- Coordinates: 40°44′06.10″N 030°05′00.01″E

Map
- Location of airport in Turkey KCO (NATO) KCO (North Atlantic)

Runways
Direction	Length		Surface
Direction	ft	m	Surface
09/27	9,842	3,000	Asphalt

Statistics (2025)
- Annual passenger capacity: 800,000
- Passengers: 3,746
- Passenger change 2024–25: ▼29%
- Aircraft movements: 737
- Movements change 2024–25: ▲7%

Cengiz Topel Naval Air Station (Turkish: Cengiz Topel Deniz Hava Üssü), a.k.a. Topel Airport or formerly Cengiz Topel Air Base, (IATA: KCO, ICAO: LTBQ) is a Turkish Navy air station located east of İzmit in Kocaeli Province, Turkey. The airport is in joint use for military and civil. Restructured in 1976, it hosts the Turkish Naval Aviation Command with two flying units, the 301st Squadron of fixed-wing aircraft and the 351st Squadron of rotorcrafts.

The facility, formerly a base of the Turkish Air Force, is named after the Air Force fighter pilot Capt. Cengiz Topel, whose F-100 Super Sabre was shot down on August 8, 1964 during Turkey's military air bombardment in Cyprus. He ejected safely over land, but was promptly captured after landing and lynched by members of the Cyprus National Guard. He was the first Turkish pilot ever killed in action.

== History ==
Topel Airport was originally a Turkish Air Force facility. Following the re-establishment of the aviation branch of the Turkish Navy in 1968, the first naval helicopter pilots were trained by the Turkish Army Aviation Command's flight school at the Güvercinlik Army Air Base in Etimesgut, Ankara Province. The unit, formed in 1972 at the same base, was transferred on 19 May 1973 from Ankara to Cengiz Topel Air Base due to its location close to Gölcük Naval Base in Kocaeli Province following a protocol signed with the Turkish Air Force two weeks before. That day, Turkish Navy's first rotorcraft unit was renamed 351st Naval Helicopter Squadron.

The 301st Naval Air Squadron, formed in 1971 at Etimesgut Air Base in Ankara Province as the fixed wing aviation unit of the Navy, was transferred on 4 August 1972 to Bandırma Air Base to join the 6th Air Force Wing. With its four maritime patrol aircraft and twelve anti-submarine warfare (ASW) aircraft of type S-2 Tracker, the unit was then relocated to Cengiz Topel Air Base on 14 July 1976.

The base, in joint use since 1973 by the air force and the navy, was transferred to the Turkish Navy Command on 14 July 1976 following the order of the Turkish General Staff. Finally, the Naval Air Station Command was established on 4 August 1976.

The base was assigned to NATO on 28 October 1981. In 1983, helipads in Istanbul and Çanakkale were put in service so that helicopters of the air station could use them also.

In 2011, the airport was opened to public air traffic. Anadolujet operated domestic flights.

== Airlines and destinations ==
The following airlines operate regular scheduled and charter flights at Cengiz Topel Airport:

Airlines	Destinations
Pegasus Airlines	Seasonal: Trabzon

== Traffic Statistics ==
Kocaeli–Cengiz Topel Airport passenger traffic statistics
Year (months)	Domestic	% change	International	% change	Total	% change
2025	-	▼100%	3,746	▲107%	3,746	▼29%
2024	3,498	-	1,808	▼39%	5,306	▲79%
2023	-	▼100%	2,967	▲78%	2,967	▲68%
2022	103	▼99%	1,664	-	1,767	▼81%
2021	9,173	▼15%	-	-	9,173	▼15%
2020	10,784	▼79%	1,067	▼79%	11,851	▼79%
2019	52,107	▲5%	5,173	▲16%	57,280	▲6%
2018	49,656	▲7%	4,454	▲55%	54,110	▲10%
2017	46,363	▼20%	2,879	▲122%	49,242	▼17%
2016	57,753	▲39%	1,296	▲1158%	59,049	▲42%
2015	41,625	▲252%	103	-	41,728	▲252%
2014	11,841	▼10%	-	-	11,841	▼10%
2013	13,200	▼79%	-	-	13,200	▼79%
2012	62,311	▲426%	-	-	62,311	▲426%
2011	11,851	Steady	-	Steady	11,851	Steady

== Access ==
Cengiz Topel Naval Air Station is situated 2 km (1.2 mi) east of Köseköy neighborhood in İzmit and 5 km (3.1 mi) west of Lake Sapanca between the highway E80 / D.100 and the motorway O-4.
