= Muş Airport =

Muş Sultan Alparslan Airport Muş Sultan Alparslan Havalimanı
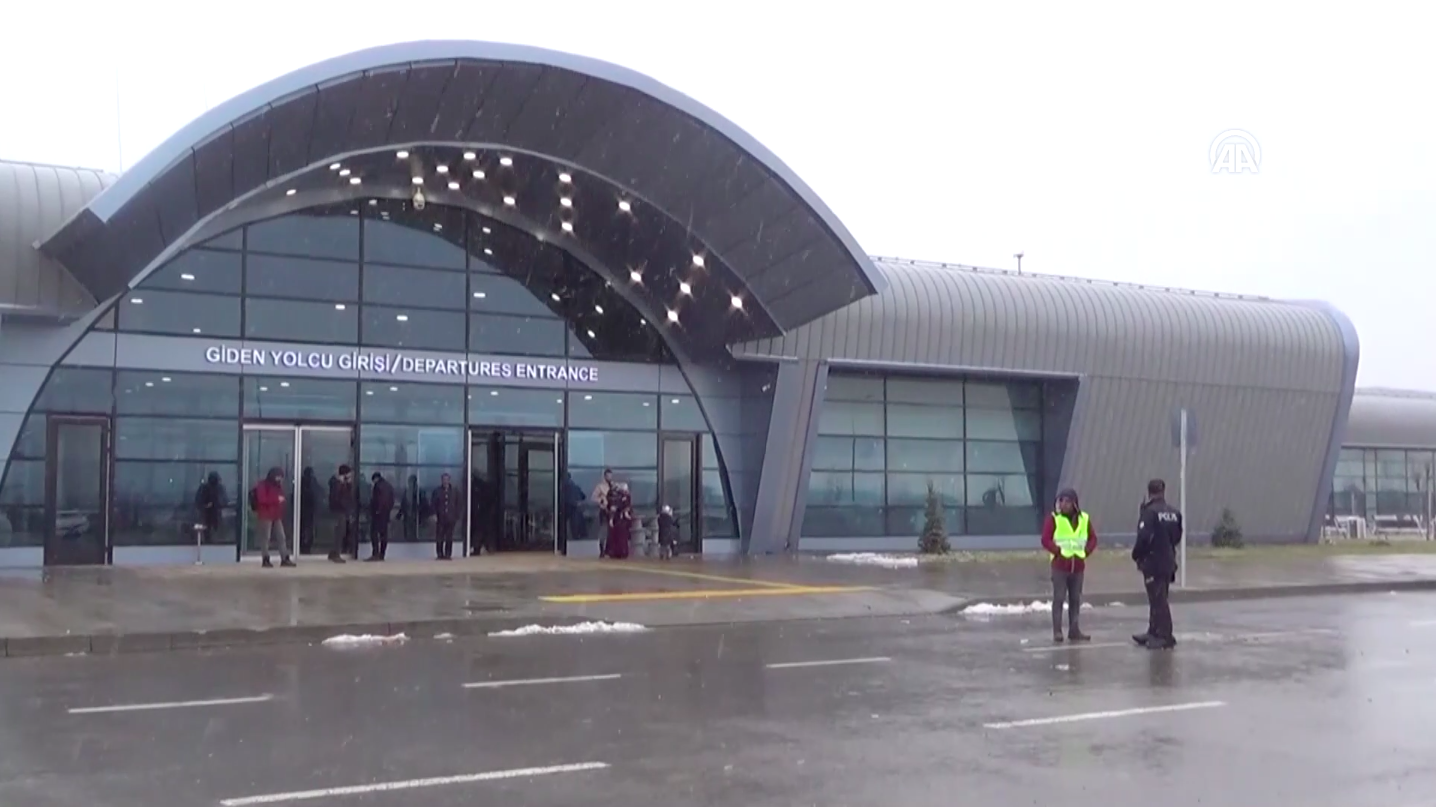
- IATA: MSR; ICAO: LTCK

Summary
- Airport type: Public / Military
- Operator: General Directorate of State Airports Authority
- Serves: Muş, Turkey
- Location: Muş, Turkey
- Opened: 26 February 1992; 34 years ago
- Elevation AMSL: 4,157 ft / 1,267 m
- Coordinates: 38°44′41″N 41°39′14″E
- Website: www.dhmi.gov.tr

Map
- Location of airport in Turkey

Runways
Direction	Length		Surface
Direction	m	ft	Surface
11/29	3,551	11,649	Asphalt

Statistics (2025)
- Annual passenger capacity: 2,000,000
- Passengers: 637,803
- Passenger change 2024–25: ▲26%
- Aircraft movements: 4,441
- Movements change 2024–25: ▲41%

Muş "Sultan Alparslan" Airport (IATA: MSR, ICAO: LTCK) is an airport in Muş, Turkey.

== Airlines and destinations ==
The following airlines operate regular scheduled and charter flights at Muş Airport:

Airlines	Destinations
AJet	Ankara, Bursa
Pegasus Airlines	Istanbul–Sabiha Gökçen
Turkish Airlines	Istanbul

== Traffic Statistics ==
Muş–Sultan Alparslan Airport Passenger Traffic Statistics
Year (months)	Domestic	% change	International	% change	Total	% change
2025	634,298	▲26%	3,505	▲128%	637,803	▲26%
2024	503,479	▲5%	1,537	▲26%	505,016	▲5%
2023	479,292	▲38%	1,223	▲116%	480,515	▲38%
2022	346,899	▼6%	567	-	347,466	▼5%
2021	367,390	▲33%	-	▼100%	367,390	▲32%
2020	276,697	▼28%	1,263	▼20%	277,960	▼28%
2019	384,011	▼16%	1,575	▼33%	385,586	▼16%
2018	457,504	▲5%	2,359	▲65%	459,863	▲5%
2017	436,610	▲17%	1,427	▲26%	438,037	▲17%
2016	373,025	▲9%	1,129	▼3%	374,154	▲9%
2015	340,703	▲9%	1,163	▼4%	341,866	▲9%
2014	313,656	▲18%	1,213	▼20%	314,869	▲17%
2013	266,635	▲30%	1,519	▲1%	268,154	▲29%
2012	205,740	▲5%	1,508	▲98%	207,248	▲5%
2011	195,784	▲10%	762	▼31%	196,546	▲9%
2010	178,705	▲56%	1,103	▼28%	179,808	▲55%
2009	114,268	▲30%	1,527	▲106%	115,795	▲30%
2008	88,132	▲269%	743	-	88,875	▲272%
2007	23,905	Steady	-	Steady	23,905	Steady
