= Aydın Çıldır Airport =

Aydın Çıldır Airport Aydın Çıldır Havalimanı
- IATA: CII; ICAO: LTBD

Summary
- Airport type: Public
- Operator: Turkish Airlines
- Serves: Aydın, Turkey
- Location: Efeler, Aydın, Turkey
- Opened: 2005; 21 years ago
- Elevation AMSL: 103 ft (31 m)
- Coordinates: 37°48′54″N 27°53′21″E

Map
- Location of airport in Turkey

Runways
Direction	Length		Surface
Direction	m	ft	Surface
09/27	1,435	4,708	Concrete

Aydın Çıldır Airport (IATA: CII, ICAO: LTBD) is an airport located southeast of the city of Aydın, in the Aydın Province of Turkey. DHMI has transferred the operation of this airport to Turkish Airlines for 20 years on 20 June 2012 after a public tender. Turkish Airlines Flight Academy has operated a flying school here since June 2013.
