= Ordu–Giresun Airport =

Airport in the Republic of Turkey

Ordu–Giresun Airport Ordu–Giresun Havalimanı
- IATA: OGU; ICAO: LTCB

Summary
- Airport type: Public
- Operator: General Directorate of State Airports Authority
- Serves: Ordu and Giresun, Turkey
- Location: Gülyalı, Ordu, Turkey
- Opened: 22 May 2015; 11 years ago
- Elevation AMSL: 11 ft (3.4 m)
- Coordinates: 40°58′00″N 38°04′48″E
- Website: dhmi.gov.tr

Map
- Location of airport in Turkey OGU (Europe)

Runways
Direction	Length		Surface
Direction	m	ft	Surface
10/28	3,000	9,842	Concrete/asphalt

Statistics (2025)
- Annual passenger capacity: 2,000,000
- Passengers: 1,163,300
- Passenger change 2024–25: ▲22%
- Aircraft movements: 8,009
- Movements change 2024–25: ▲26%

Ordu–Giresun Airport (IATA: OGU, ICAO: LTCB) (Turkish: Ordu-Giresun Havalimanı) is an airport on an artificial island just off the coast of Gülyalı, a town in Ordu Province, Turkey and Piraziz, a town in Giresun Province, Turkey. It is located 19 km (12 mi) away from Ordu and 25 km (16 mi) from Giresun city centres. It is the third artificial island airport in the world.

== History ==
The idea for an airport on an artificial island for the two Black Sea provinces was first conceived in 1992. The construction work was started in 1994. However, due to high costs, the project came to a halt shortly afterward. The government took a second airport project into consideration, and plans were worked out between 2008 and 2010. The project started on 13 July 2011. The opening of the airport for traffic took place on 22 May 2015. The airport is on reclaimed land from the sea in Gülyalı. About 30 million tons of rocks were used for the artificial island. It has a 3,000 m × 45 m (9,843 ft × 148 ft) runway, a 240 m × 120 m (790 ft × 390 ft) airport apron, a 250 m × 24 m (820 ft × 79 ft) taxiway, a 20,000 m^{2} (220,000 sq ft) terminal building as well as 16,500 m^{2} (178,000 sq ft) technical service and air traffic control building.

The airport's construction cost ₺ 290 million (US$128.5 million). It is expected to serve about 2 million passengers annually for the two provinces Ordu and Giresun, which have a total population of 1.2 million.

== Airlines and destinations ==
The following airlines operate regular scheduled and charter flights at Ordu–Giresun Airport:

Airlines	Destinations
AJet	Ankara, Istanbul–Sabiha Gökçen; Seasonal: İzmir
Fly Kıbrıs Airlines	Ercan
Pegasus Airlines	Istanbul–Sabiha Gökçen; Seasonal: Düsseldorf
SunExpress	Seasonal: Düsseldorf, Stuttgart
Turkish Airlines	Istanbul; Seasonal: Munich

== Traffic statistics ==
Ordu–Giresun Airport passenger traffic statistics
Year (months)	Domestic	% change	International	% change	Total	% change
2025	1,117,152	▲20%	46,148	▲143%	1,163,300	▲22%
2024	932,849	▼4%	18,993	▼26%	951,842	▼5%
2023	975,909	▲23%	25,620	▲37%	1,001,529	▲23%
2022	794,731	▲8%	18,639	▲865%	813,370	▲10%
2021	738,721	▲35%	1,932	▼78%	740,653	▲33%
2020	547,536	▼47%	8,896	▼65%	556,432	▼48%
2019	1,034,750	▼4%	25,515	▲30%	1,060,265	▼3%
2018	1,074,918	▼3%	19,632	▼77%	1,094,550	▼8%
2017	1,103,514	▲42%	84,272	▲342%	1,187,786	▲49%
2016	777,108	▲251%	19,080	▲1120%	796,188	▲257%
2015	221,372	Steady	1,564	Steady	222,936	Steady

^1: 2015 statistics correspond to the last 8 months of 2015 since the opening of the airport.
