= Uşak Airport =

Uṣak Airport Uşak Havalimanı
- IATA: USQ; ICAO: LTBO

Summary
- Airport type: Public
- Operator: General Directorate of State Airports Authority
- Serves: Uşak, Turkey
- Location: Uşak, Turkey
- Opened: 20 June 1998; 28 years ago
- Elevation AMSL: 2,897 ft / 883 m
- Coordinates: 38°40′47″N 29°28′54″E

Map
- Location of airport in Turkey

Runways
| Direction | Length | | Surface |
| Direction | ft | m | Surface |
|---|---|---|---|
| 09/27 | 8,385 | 2,556 | Concrete |

Statistics (2025)
- Annual passenger capacity: 500,000

Uşak Airport is the main airport of the city of Uşak in the Aegean Region of Turkey.

== Traffic statistics ==
Uşak Airport passenger traffic statistics
| Year (months) | Domestic | % change | International | % change | Total | % change |
|---|---|---|---|---|---|---|
| 2023 | 30 | - | 26 | - | 56 | - |
| 2022 | - | - | - | - | - | - |
| 2021 | 52 | ▼99% | - | ▼100% | 52 | ▼99% |
| 2020 | 6,792 | ▼75% | 708 | ▲39% | 7,500 | ▼73% |
| 2019 | 27,475 | ▲27% | 508 | ▲176% | 27,983 | ▲28% |
| 2018 | 21,713 | - | 184 | - | 21,897 | - |
| 2017 | - | ▼100% | - | - | - | ▼100% |
| 2016 | 12,303 | ▲12% | 330 | - | 12,633 | ▲15% |
| 2015 | 11,017 | ▲31% | - | - | 11,017 | ▲31% |
| 2014 | 8,405 | - | - | - | 8,405 | - |
| 2013 | - | - | - | - | - | - |
| 2012 | - | ▼100% | - | - | - | ▼100% |
| 2011 | 15,267 | ▼4% | - | - | 15,267 | ▼4% |
| 2010 | 15,889 | ▲54% | - | - | 15,889 | ▲54% |
| 2009 | 10,327 | ▼59% | - | - | 10,327 | ▼59% |
| 2008 | 25,305 | ▼19% | - | - | 25,305 | ▼19% |
| 2007 | 31,328 | Steady | - | Steady | 31,328 | Steady |
