= Amasya Merzifon Airport =

Amasya Merzifon Airport Amasya Merzifon Havalimanı
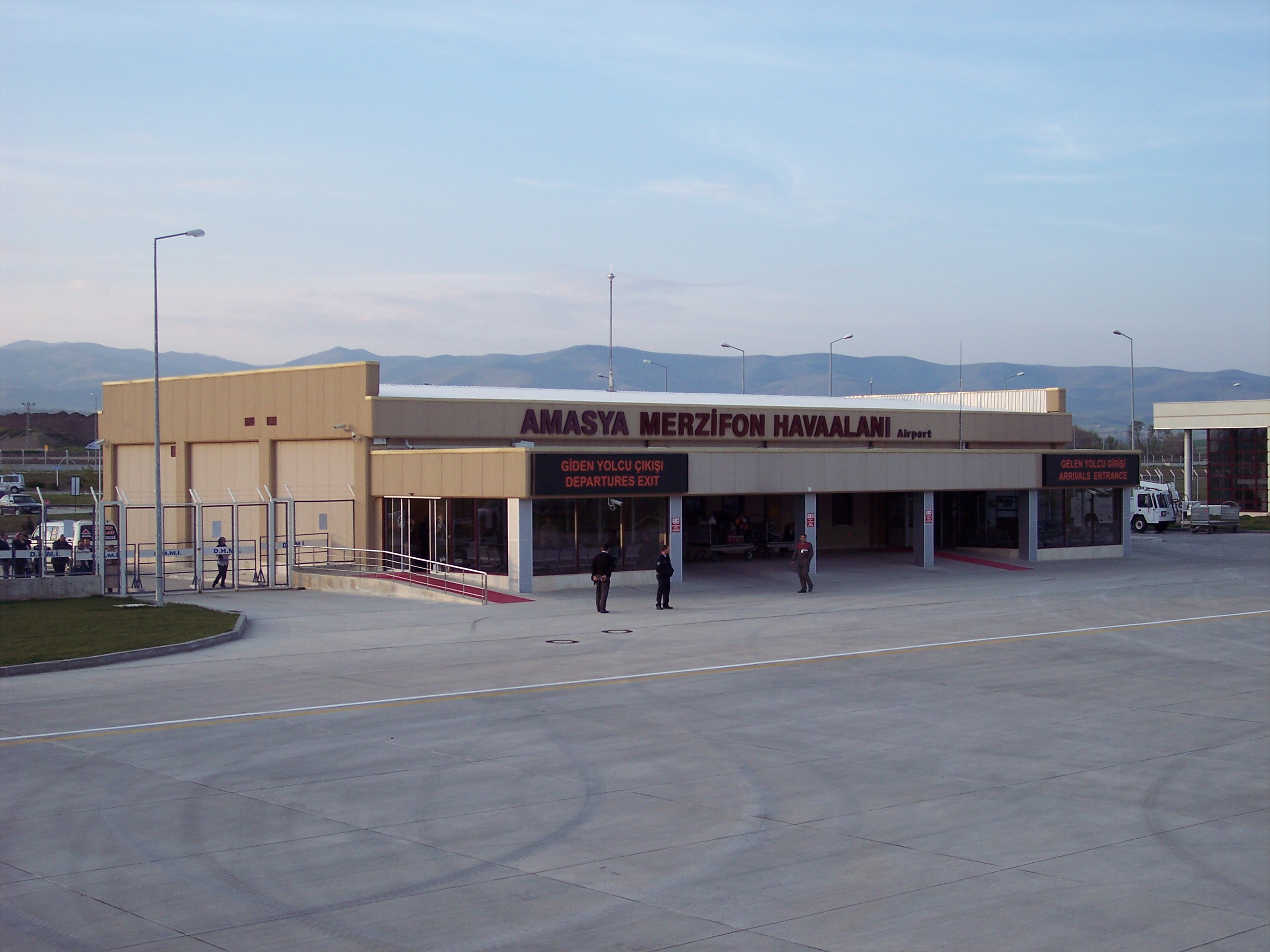
- IATA: MZH; ICAO: LTAP

Summary
- Airport type: Public / Military
- Operator: General Directorate of State Airports Authority
- Serves: Amasya, Turkey
- Location: Merzifon, Amasya, Turkey
- Opened: 20 June 2008; 18 years ago
- Elevation AMSL: 1,758 ft (536 m)
- Coordinates: 40°49′45″N 035°31′19″E
- Website: www.dhmi.gov.tr

Map
- Location of airport in Turkey

Runways
Direction	Length		Surface
Direction	m	ft	Surface
05R/23L	3,235	10,614	Concrete
05L/23R	3,235	10,614	Concrete

Statistics (2025)
- Annual passenger capacity: 700,000
- Passengers: 154,954
- Passenger change 2024–25: ▲12%
- Aircraft movements: 1,278
- Movements change 2024–25: ▲16%

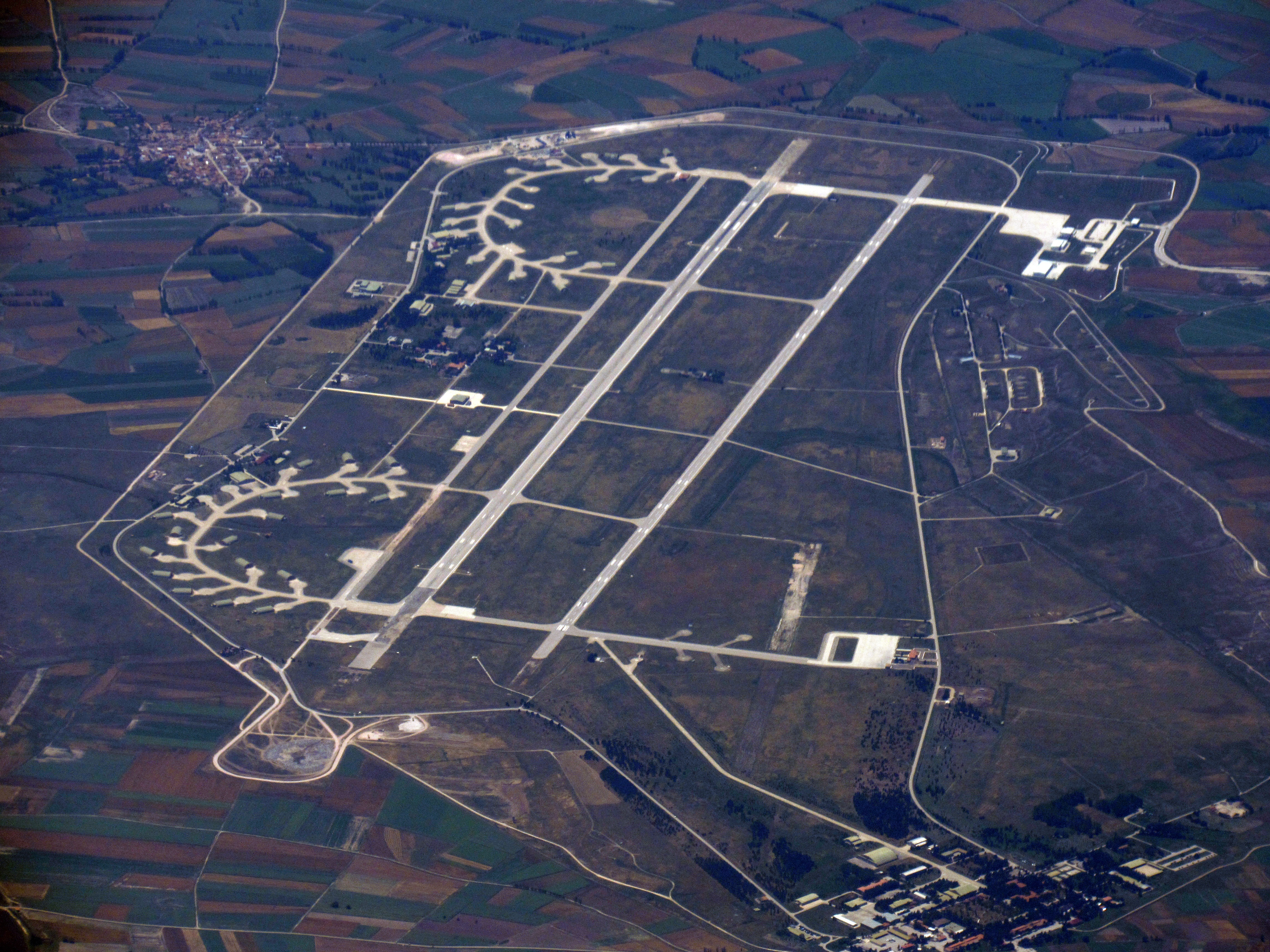
Aerial view of the airport.

Merzifon Airport (Turkish: Amasya Merzifon Havalimanı) or Amasya Merzifon Airport (IATA: MZH, ICAO: LTAP) is a military airport located in the city of Merzifon in the Amasya Province of Turkey.

== Airlines and destinations ==
The following airlines operate regular scheduled and charter flights at Amasya Merzifon Airport:

Airlines	Destinations
Pegasus Airlines	Istanbul–Sabiha Gökçen
Turkish Airlines	Istanbul

== Traffic statistics ==
Amasya–Merzifon Airport passenger traffic statistics
Year (months)	Domestic	% change	International	% change	Total	% change
2025	137,465	▲10%	17,489	▲38%	154,954	▲12%
2024	125,184	▲4%	12,666	▲25%	137,850	▲6%
2023	120,078	▲50%	10,126	▼23%	130,204	▲40%
2022	80,065	▼11%	13,168	▼38%	93,233	▼16%
2021	90,219	▲5%	21,226	▲423%	111,445	▲24%
2020	85,951	▼47%	4,062	▼41%	90,013	▼46%
2019	160,842	▼6%	6,916	▼24%	167,758	▼7%
2018	171,379	▼19%	9,092	▼11%	180,471	▼19%
2017	211,834	▲140%	10,162	▲198%	221,996	▲142%
2016	88,318	▼38%	3,411	▼11%	91,729	▼37%
2015	142,378	▲5%	3,830	▲43%	146,208	▲6%
2014	135,073	▲20%	2,680	▲235%	137,753	▲21%
2013	112,659	▲38%	799	▼42%	113,458	▲37%
2012	81,362	▲69%	1,388	-	82,750	▲72%
2011	48,035	▼25%	-	▼100%	48,035	▼25%
2010	64,007	▲62%	386	▲109%	64,393	▲63%
2009	39,392	▲184%	185	-	39,577	▲185%
2008	-	Steady	13,888	Steady	13,888	Steady

^1: 2008 statistics correspond to the last 7 months of 2008 since the opening of the airport.

== Military usage ==
Merzifon is the 5th Air Wing (Ana Jet Üs or AJÜ) of the 2nd Air Force Command (Hava Kuvvet Komutanligi) of the Turkish Air Force (Türk Hava Kuvvetleri). Other wings of this command are located in Malatya/Erhaç (LTAT), Diyarbakır (LTCC) and İncirlik (LTAG).
