= Konaklı, Antalya =

Konaklı
- Neighbourhood
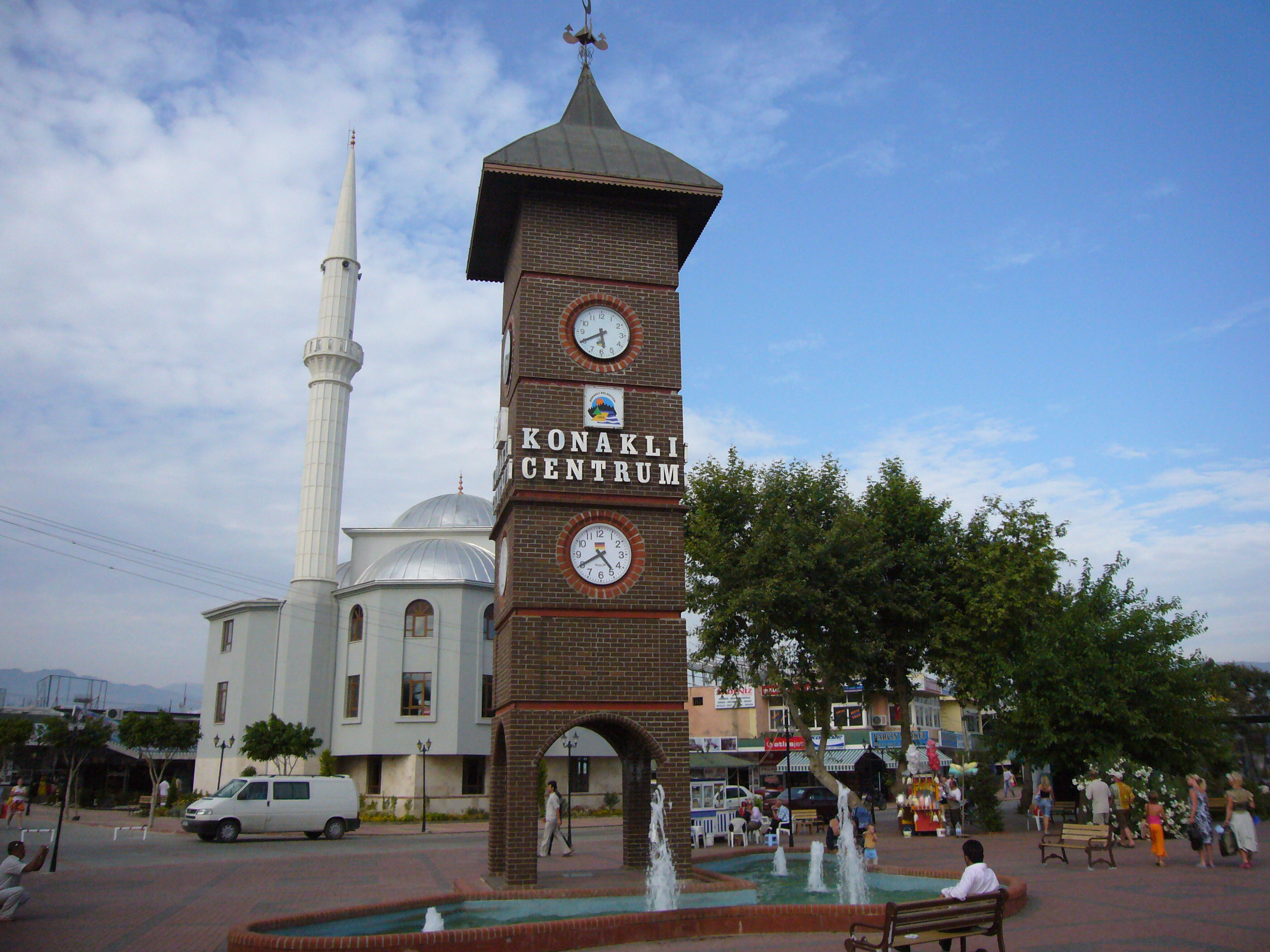

- Location within Turkey
- Coordinates: 36°35′N 31°53′E
- Country: Turkey
- Province: Antalya
- District: Alanya
- Elevation: 20 m (66 ft)
- Population (2022): 17,966
- Time zone: UTC+3 (TRT)
- Postal code: 07490
- Area code: 0242

Konaklı (formerly Şarapsa and Telatiye) is a neighbourhood in the municipality and district of Alanya, Antalya Province, Turkey. Its population is 17,966 (2022). Before the 2013 reorganisation, it was a town (belde).

== Geography ==
Konaklı is a coastal town in Alanya district of Antalya Province. It is on Turkish state highway D.400 which runs from west to east in south Turkey. Distance to downtown Alanya is 80 kilometres (50 mi), to Antalya is 220 kilometres (140 mi), to Antalya International Airport is 115 kilometres (71 mi), and to Alanya-Gazipaşa International Airport is 54 kilometres (34 mi).

== History ==
There are ruins of the Roman city Augae in the vicinity. The road constructed by the Seljuk sultan Alaattin Keykubat I connecting Alanya to Konya and the Şarapsa Han built by Seljuk sultan Gıyaseddin Keyhüsrev II (both in the 13th century) are in the vicinity.

In 1992, Konaklı was declared a seat of township.

== Economy ==
The town economy depends highly on tourism. There are over fifteen 5-star beach resorts in the town.

Greenhouse agriculture and banana plantations are other profitable sectors.

== Healthcare ==
Healthcare in the town is mainly provided by two organizations:

- Kemal Atlı Family Health Center (also called Kemal Atlı Aile Sağlığı Merkezi); a 9-to-5 state-owned minor-level primary care center which only serves the native population.
- Konaklı Medical Center (also called Özel Konaklı Polikliniği - Private Konaklı Polyclinic); a 24/7 private mid-level polyclinic and healthcare center led by Dr. Adnan Sarı M.D. wherein all physicians are multilingual as it predominantly serves the growing European population of the town.
