= LEAV Aviation =

German airline

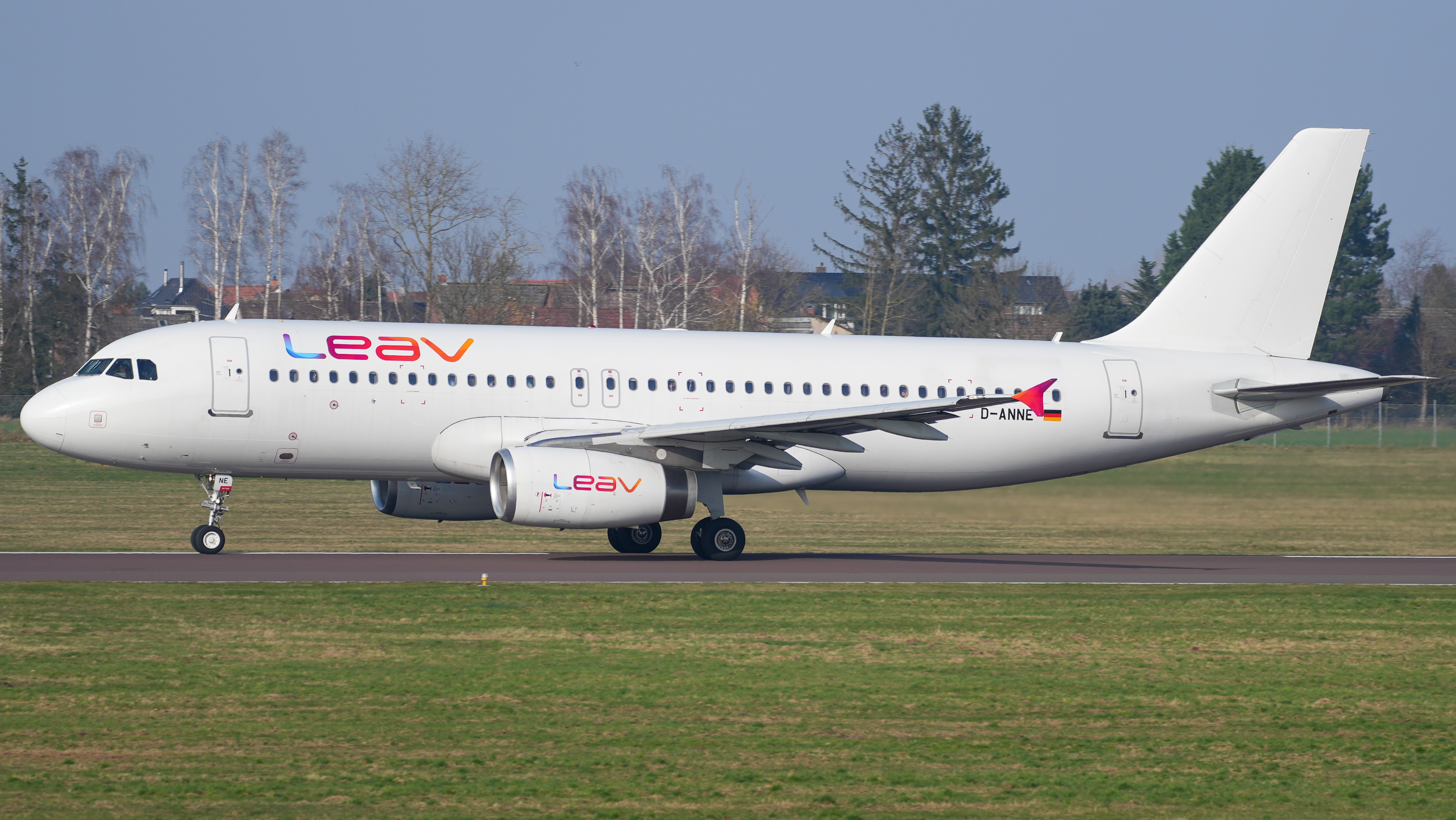
- Leav Aviation Airbus A320-200
IATA	ICAO	Call sign
KK	NGN	YODA
- Founded: 2020
- Hubs: Cologne Bonn Airport
- Fleet size: 3
- Headquarters: Cologne, Germany
- Key people: Daniel Broda (CEO)
- Total assets: €8.7 Million (2023)
- Employees: 110
- Website: www.leav.com/en/

LEAV Aviation GmbH, DBA LEAV Aviation, is a German airline based in Cologne and based at Cologne Bonn Airport.

== History ==
In September 2020, the company was founded as JOOT Aviation Project GmbH under the leadership of former EasyJet pilot and entrepreneur Daniel Broda and former Germania manager Johannes Klinsmann, and renamed LEAV Aviation GmbH in May 2021.

The first aircraft, an Airbus A320-200, was delivered to Cologne Bonn Airport in September 2021 and registered to the company in February 2022. The second aircraft followed in August 2022. The Air Operator Certificate (AOC) was issued by the German Federal Aviation Office on May 4, 2022, and flight operations commenced shortly thereafter.

Leaving Aviation is approximately three-quarters owned by Daniel Broda and Johannes Klinsmann, with the remaining shares distributed among about a dozen German, Swiss, and Czech investors. A profit was already generated in the 2023 financial year.

In the spring of 2025, LEAV Aviation equipped its two aircraft with in-flight entertainment systems and RGB interior lighting, and simultaneously passed the first phase of the SARPcheck audit program.

From July 17, 2025, to September 30, 2025, an Airbus A320 with the registration D-ANNE flew in a special McDonald's livery. The golden M was also affixed to all the aircraft's headrests during this period.

== Services ==
LEAV Aviation offers charter and ACMI services. Particularly during the summer season, short-term sub-charters are provided for other airlines. Customers include TUI Airlines, Corendon Airlines Europe, Marabu Airlines, Transavia, and Transavia France. For the summer season of 2024, an aircraft was leased long-term to TUI Airlines Belgium for the first time. Charter services are also provided for sports teams and cruise lines.

In the summer 2023 flight schedule, LEAV Aviation also began operating its own scheduled flights for the first time. The destinations are primarily in tourist regions.

== Destinations ==
LEAV Aviation does not operate a regular flight schedule, but it does run some scheduled flights from Cologne-Bonn Airport to various destinations in the Mediterranean region, as well as from Munich Airport and Frankfurt Airport. Starting with the summer 2026 flight schedule, the airline will also serve destinations from Münster Osnabrück Airport and Erfurt–Weimar Airport.

== Fleet ==
=== Current fleet ===
As of July 2026, LEAV Aviation operates the following aircraft:

Aircraft	In service	Orders	Passengers			Notes
Aircraft	In service	Orders	C	Y	Total	Notes
Airbus A320	3	—	—	180	180	
Total	3	—	—N/a			

=== Fleet development ===
Daniel Broda announced plans to integrate a third A320 into the fleet starting in October 2025 and to consider acquiring a fourth aircraft in 2026.

=== Special liveries ===
Aircraft type	Reg.	Livery	Period	Image
Airbus A320-200	D-ANNE	"Around the World with McDonald's"	17 July–30 September 2025	
