= Corendon Dutch Airlines =

Dutch airline

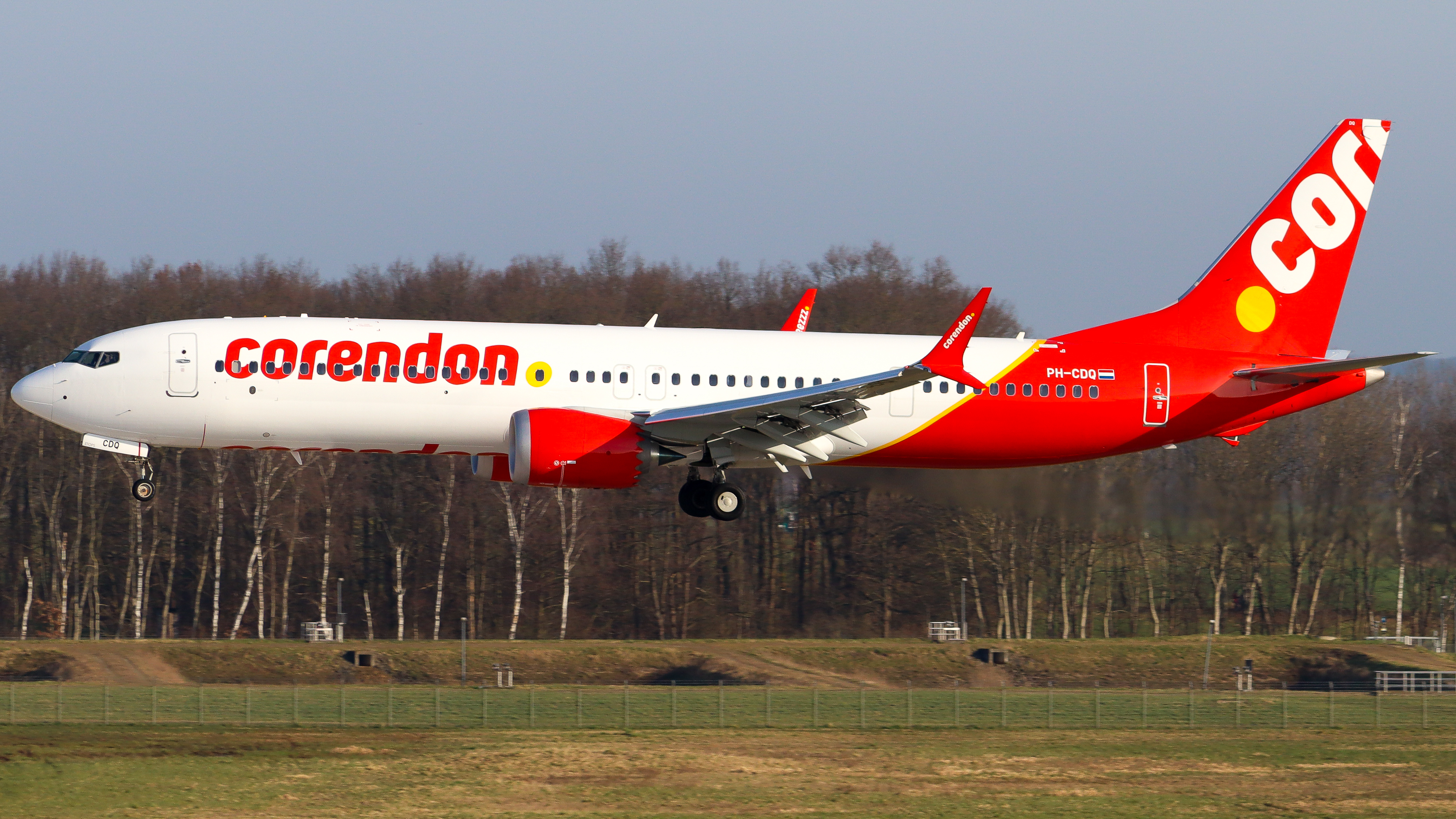
- Corendon Dutch Airlines Boeing 737 MAX 9
IATA	ICAO	Call sign
CD	CND	DUTCH CORENDON
- Founded: 2010; 16 years ago
- AOC #: NL-AOC-68
- Operating bases: Amsterdam Airport Schiphol; Maastricht Aachen Airport
- Fleet size: 3
- Destinations: 28
- Parent company: Corendon Tourism Group
- Headquarters: Badhoevedorp, Netherlands
- Key people: Atilay Uslu (Founder); Gunay Uslu (CEO)
- Website: corendon.nl

Corendon Dutch Airlines is a Dutch charter and scheduled airline headquartered in Badhoevedorp, Haarlemmermeer. It is a sister company of Corendon Airlines and Corendon Airlines Europe.

== History ==
First logo, used until 2014

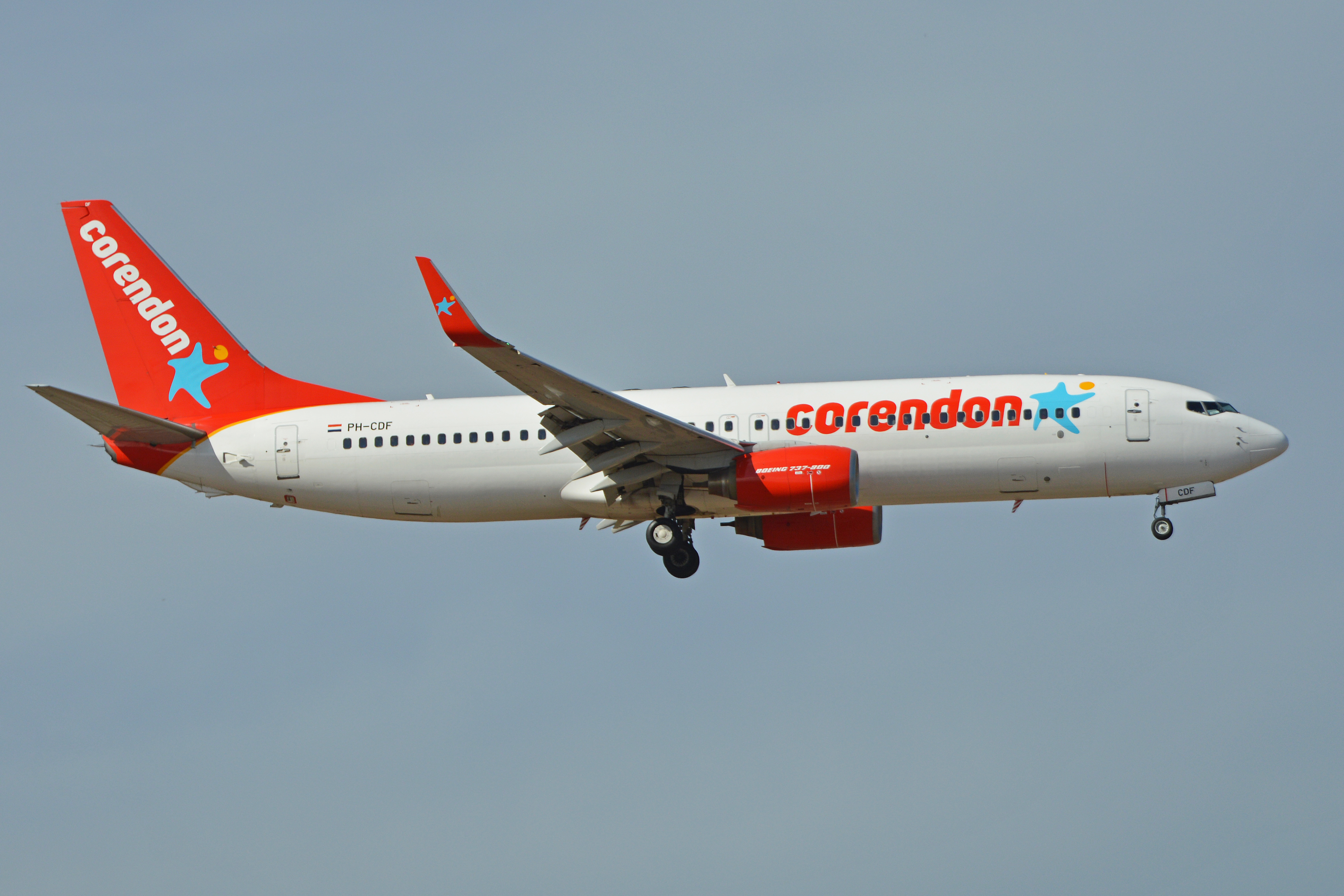
A former Corendon Dutch Airlines Boeing 737-800 in a previous livery

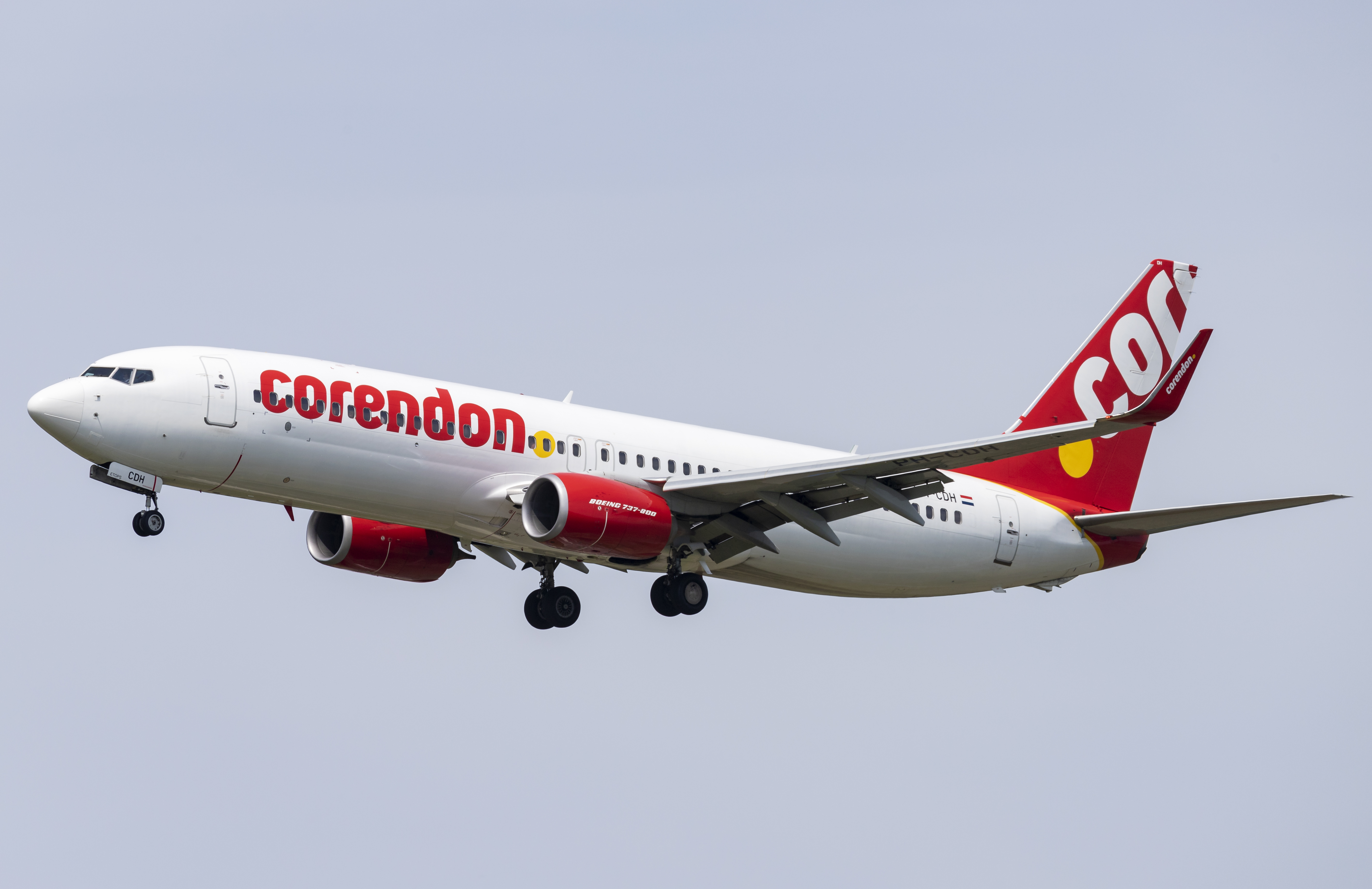
A former Corendon Dutch Airlines Boeing 737-800 in the current livery

Corendon Dutch Airlines is the Dutch branch of the Corendon Group. It started operations under its own AOC in April 2011 using a single Boeing 737-800 aircraft serving European and African holiday destinations from Amsterdam Airport Schiphol and Maastricht Aachen Airport.

In November 2023, Corendon Dutch Airlines entered a long-term agreement with Spanish airline World2Fly to wetlease a single A350-900 aircraft for operations to Curaçao International Airport. The aircraft was configured to include an "Adult Only Zone" in the front of the aircraft. In 2024, Corendon Dutch Airlines started operations to Bonaire's Flamingo International Airport, utilizing the same aircraft.

In 2025, the Corendon Group celebrated its 25th anniversary by introducing a special tattoo livery on a Corendon Dutch Airlines 737 MAX 9 aircraft, designed by Dutch tattoo artist Henk Schiffmacher. The aircraft was nicknamed "Sweet Louise", after Schiffmacher's wife.

In November 2026, it was announced that Corendon Dutch Airlines would commence operations as an independent airline, no longer flying solely for the Corendon tour operator. This change will enable the airline to start its own scheduled flights and be contracted by other tour operators.

== Destinations ==
Corendon Dutch Airlines carries out charter flights, mostly for the Dutch tour operator Corendon, to the following destinations:

=== Americas ===
==== Bonaire ====
- Bonaire – Flamingo International Airport

==== Curaçao ====
- Willemstad – Curaçao International Airport

=== Africa ===
==== Egypt ====
- Hurghada – Hurghada International Airport

==== The Gambia ====
- Banjul – Banjul International Airport

==== Morocco ====
- Al Hoceima – Cherif Al Idrissi Airport

=== Europe ===
==== Bulgaria ====
- Burgas – Burgas Airport

==== Greece ====
- Corfu – Corfu International Airport
- Heraklion – Heraklion International Airport
- Kos – Kos International Airport
- Mytilini – Mytilene International Airport
- Preveza – Aktion National Airport
- Rhodes – Diagoras International Airport
- Samos – Samos International Airport
- Zakynthos -Zakynthos International Airport

==== Netherlands ====
- Amsterdam – Amsterdam Schiphol Airport
- Maastricht – Maastricht Aachen Airport
- Rotterdam – Rotterdam The Hague Airport

==== North-Macedonia ====
- Ohrid – Ohrid Airport

==== Spain ====
- Gran Canaria – Gran Canaria Airport
- Tenerife – Tenerife South Airport
- Ibiza – Ibiza Airport
- Palma de Mallorca – Palma de Mallorca Airport

==== Turkey ====
- Antalya – Antalya Airport
- Bodrum – Milas–Bodrum Airport
- Dalaman – Dalaman Airport
- Gazipaşa – Gazipaşa-Alanya Airport
- İzmir – İzmir Adnan Menderes Airport
- Kayseri – Kayseri Airport

== Fleet ==
As of August 2025, Corendon Dutch Airlines operates the following aircraft:

Corendon Dutch Airlines fleet
Aircraft	In service	Orders	Passengers	Notes
Boeing 737 MAX 9	3	—	213	Replaced the Boeing 737-800 in 2023
Total	3	—		
