= Aunesis =

Coastal town of ancient Pamphylia

Coordinates: 36°34′26″N 31°55′25″E

Aunesis (Ancient Greek: Αὔνησις) was a coastal town of ancient Pamphylia or of Cilicia, inhabited during Roman times. It was the port of Hamaxia.

Its site is located below Hamaxia, in Turkey.
