= Hannover Airport =

International airport in Langenhagen, Lower Saxony, Germany

Hannover Airport Flughafen Hannover

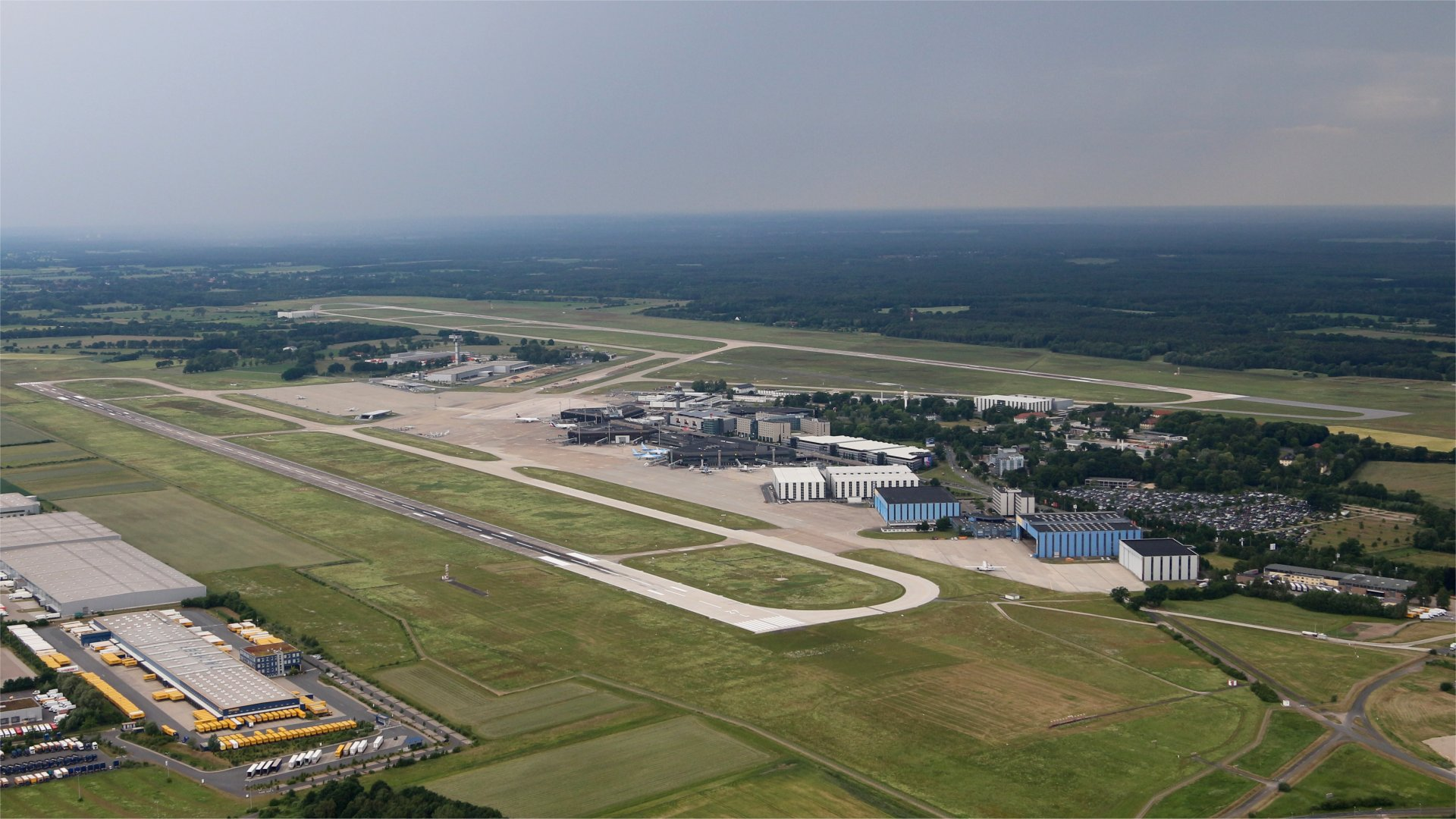
- IATA: HAJ; ICAO: EDDV

Summary
- Airport type: Public
- Owner/Operator: Flughafen Hannover-Langenhagen GmbH
- Serves: Hannover-Braunschweig-Göttingen-Wolfsburg Metropolitan Region
- Location: Langenhagen, Lower Saxony
- Opened: 26 April 1952; 74 years ago
- Operating base for: Corendon Airlines Europe; Eurowings; TUI fly Deutschland
- Elevation AMSL: 56 m (184 ft)
- Coordinates: 52.460214°N 9.683522°E
- Website: hannover-airport.de

Map
- Airport diagram

Runways
Direction	Length		Surface
Direction	m	ft	Surface
09L/27R	3,800	12,467	Concrete
09R/27L	2,340	7,677	Concrete
09C/27C	780	2,559	Asphalt

Statistics (2024)
- Passengers: 5,223,745 ▲+13,56%
- Aircraft movements: 61,871 ▲+26,6%
- Cargo (metric tons): 36,644 ▼-1,6%
- Sources: Statistics at ADV., AIP at German air traffic control.

Hannover Airport (IATA: HAJ, ICAO: EDDV) is an international airport serving Hanover, the capital of the German state of Lower Saxony. The ninth largest airport in Germany, it is situated on 570 hectares (1,400 acres) in Langenhagen, 11 kilometres (6.8 mi) north of the centre of Hanover. The airport has flights to European metropolitan and leisure destinations, and serves as a base for Eurowings, Corendon Airlines Europe and TUI fly Deutschland.

== History ==
=== Early years ===
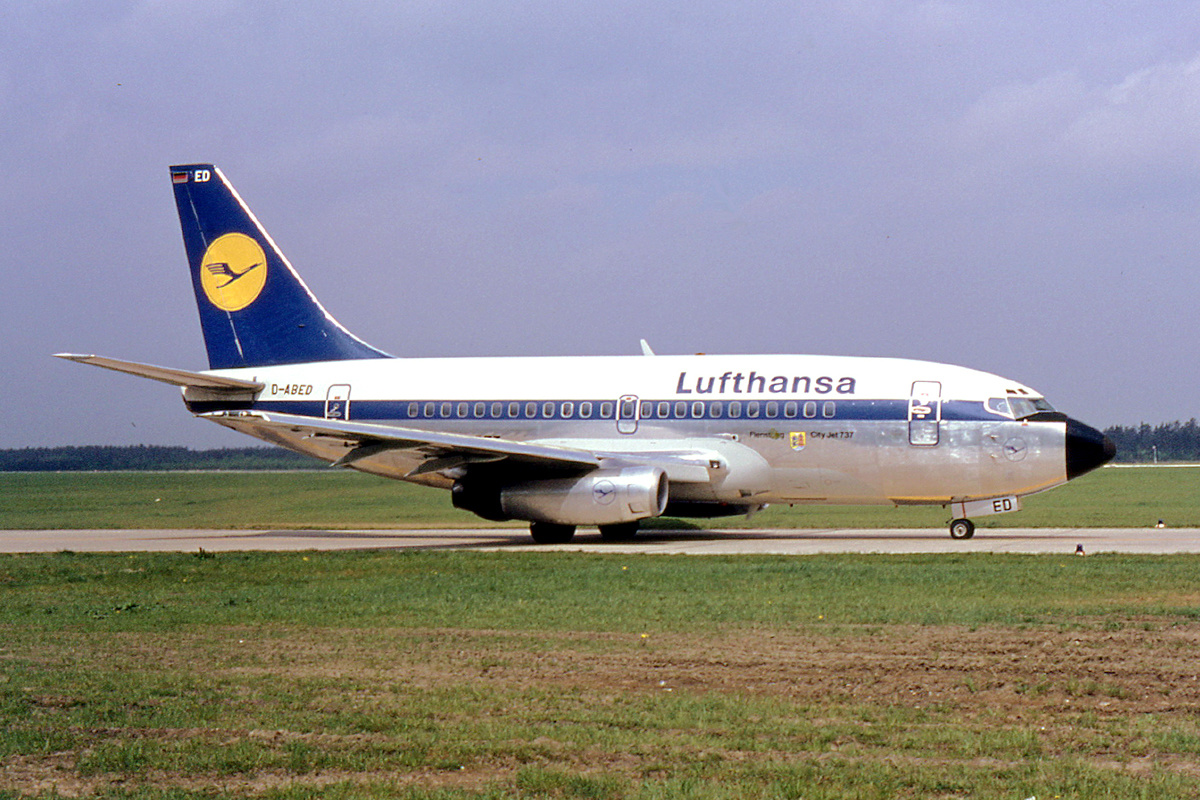
A Lufthansa Boeing 737-100 at Hannover Airport in April 1968

Hannover Airport opened in Langenhagen in 1952, replacing an airfield situated within the 1952 city limits of Hanover. In 1973 two modern passenger terminals opened as terminals A and B that, as of 2023, are still in service. Known for their compact design, Sheremetyevo International Airport in Moscow was modelled after them.

In the 1990s, trials of intercontinental services to the United States and Canada were stopped due to low passenger numbers.

Terminal C, the largest of the three passenger terminals, was opened in 1998 to handle more passengers, adding 8 more boarding gates and 3 bus departure gates. Up to 33 aircraft can be handled simultaneously, of which 20 can use aircraft stands equipped with a jet bridge. All three terminals are capable of handling a Boeing 747.

From 1957 to 1990, the airport hosted the Internationale Luft- und Raumfahrtausstellung, Germany's largest air show. After a fatal accident in 1988, when a Royal Air Force Chinook helicopter hit a jet bridge with its rotor, and after German Reunification two years later, the air show moved to Berlin in 1992.

=== Development since the 2000s ===
An S-Bahn connection was established between the airport and Hamelin via Hanover central station in 2000. This replaced the airport's shuttle bus service. While the bus service ran more frequently than the S-Bahn (it ran every 20 minutes), it also took longer to travel between the airport and central station. The train service was extended to Paderborn in 2003.

Hannover Airport has struggled to generate increased demand since the late 2000s, possibly due to not being able to attract Europe's low-cost carriers to the airport. In addition, new routes from established legacy carriers with their hubs were not able to sustain themselves, as seen with Aer Lingus, airBaltic, Finnair, Brussels Airlines, Iberia, LOT Polish Airlines, and TAP Air Portugal. Passenger traffic declined from 5.64 million in 2008 to 4.97 million in 2009, recovered to 6.30 million in 2019, fell to 1.45 million in 2020 during the COVID-19 pandemic, and reached 5.34 million in 2025. Hannover Airport is one of the very few airports in Germany that are open 24 hours a day, but only a few passenger and cargo flights operate at Hannover between 11 pm and 4 am.

In September 2006 the general aviation terminal, located near the centre runway, was renamed to Karl Jatho Terminal in honour of Hanoverian aviation pioneer Karl Jatho.

== Terminals ==
The landside areas of Hannover Airport's three passenger terminals A, B, and C (each with shops, restaurants, and travel agents) are interconnected, but each terminal also has its own, separate, airside area with further facilities. Terminals A and B each have six boarding gates equipped with jet bridges, while terminal C has eight of them. Additional bus gates are available in each concourse. Terminal A underwent a major refurbishment from April 2013, reopening on 9 July 2014.

A separate Terminal D is located east of the main terminals. It was formerly used by the Royal Air Force to transport British troops to and from northern Germany, but has been used again for regular passenger traffic during peak periods since July 2023.

== Airlines and destinations ==
=== Passenger ===
The following airlines offer regular scheduled and charter flights at Hannover Airport.

Airlines	Destinations
Aegean Airlines	Seasonal: Athens, Thessaloniki
Air Cairo	Hurghada; Seasonal: Marsa Alam
Air France	Paris–Charles de Gaulle
Air Serbia	Belgrade
AJet	Bodrum, Istanbul–Sabiha Gökçen; Seasonal: Dalaman (begins 24 April 2027)
Austrian Airlines	Vienna
British Airways	London–Heathrow
Corendon Airlines	Antalya, Fuerteventura, Gran Canaria, Hurghada, Tenerife–South; Seasonal: Adana/Mersin, Corfu, Diyarbakır, Heraklion, İzmir, Marsa Alam, Kos, Palma de Mallorca, Rhodes
Condor	Seasonal charter: Arvidsjaur
Eurowings	Palma de Mallorca, Pristina; Seasonal: Alicante, Bastia, Beirut, Erbil, Faro, Funchal, Gran Canaria, Glasgow, Hurghada, Lamezia Terme, Lisbon, Málaga, Marrakesh, Milan–Malpensa, Nice, Olbia, Pula, Rome–Fiumicino, Stockholm–Arlanda, Tenerife–South Thessaloniki; Seasonal charter: Arvidsjaur
FlyErbil	Erbil
Freebird Airlines	Antalya
GP Aviation	Pristina
KLM	Amsterdam
Lufthansa	Frankfurt, Munich
Lufthansa City Airlines	Munich
Mavi Gök Airlines	Antalya
Nesma Airlines	Hurghada
Nouvelair	Seasonal: Djerba, Monastir
Pegasus Airlines	Istanbul–Sabiha Gökçen; Seasonal: Antalya
Scandinavian Airlines	Copenhagen
Sky Alps	Seasonal: Bolzano,
SunExpress	Adana/Mersin, Antalya, Diyarbakır, Izmir; Seasonal: Bodrum, Kayseri
Swiss International Air Lines	Zürich
TUI fly Deutschland	Boa Vista, Fuerteventura, Funchal, Gran Canaria, Hurghada, Lanzarote, Palma de Mallorca, Sal, Tenerife–South; Seasonal: Burgas, Corfu, Dalaman, Djerba, Faro, Heraklion, Ibiza, Jerez de la Frontera, Kos, Larnaca, Málaga (begins 2 May 2027), Menorca, Patras, Olbia (begins 3 May 2027), Rhodes, Trieste, Varna
Turkish Airlines	Istanbul
Vueling	Barcelona

=== Cargo ===
Airlines	Destinations
Amazon Air	Barcelona, Madrid, Milan-Malpensa, Paris–Charles de Gaulle
FedEx Express	Billund, Liege, Oslo, Paris–Charles de Gaulle

== Statistics ==
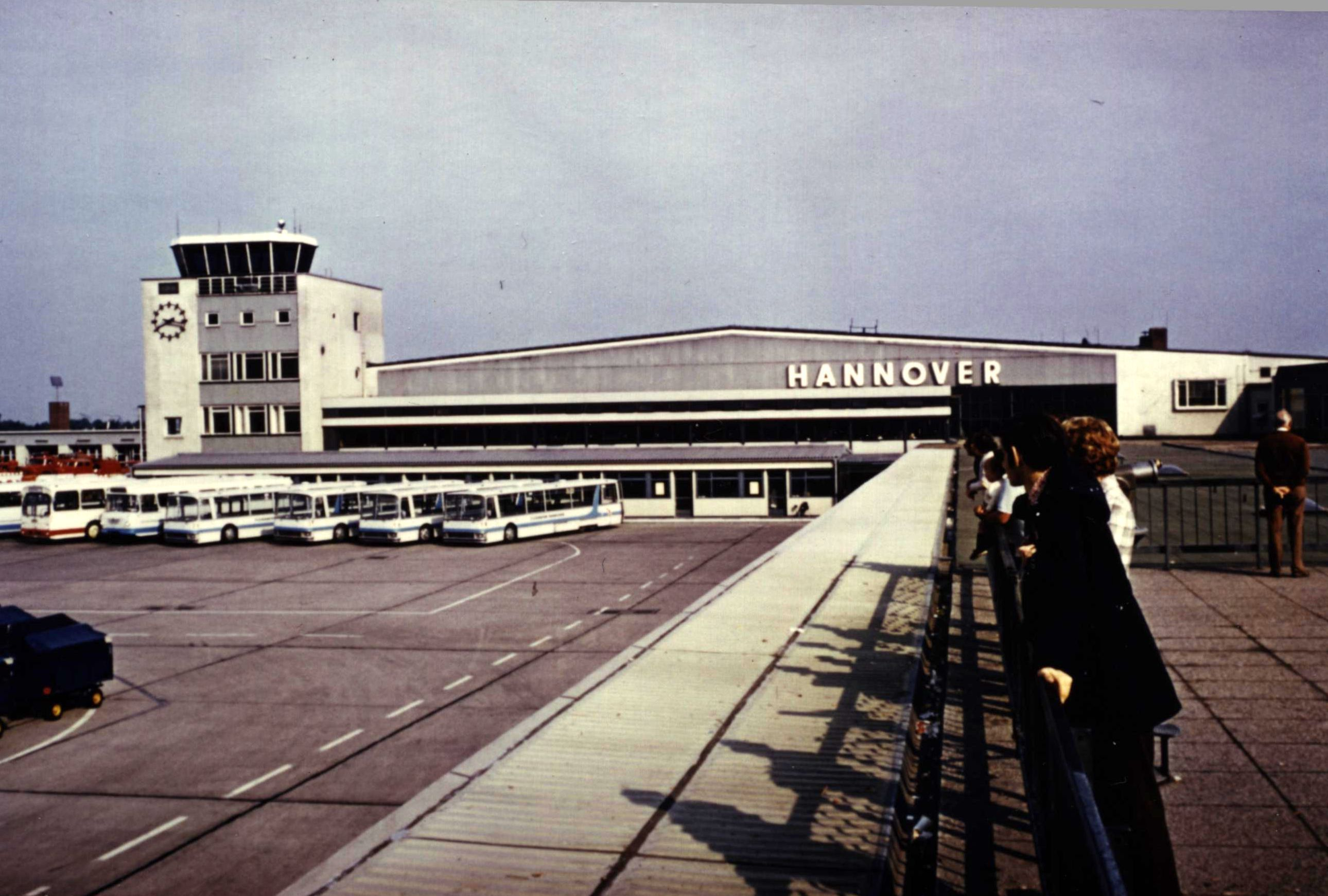
Hannover Airport in 1970

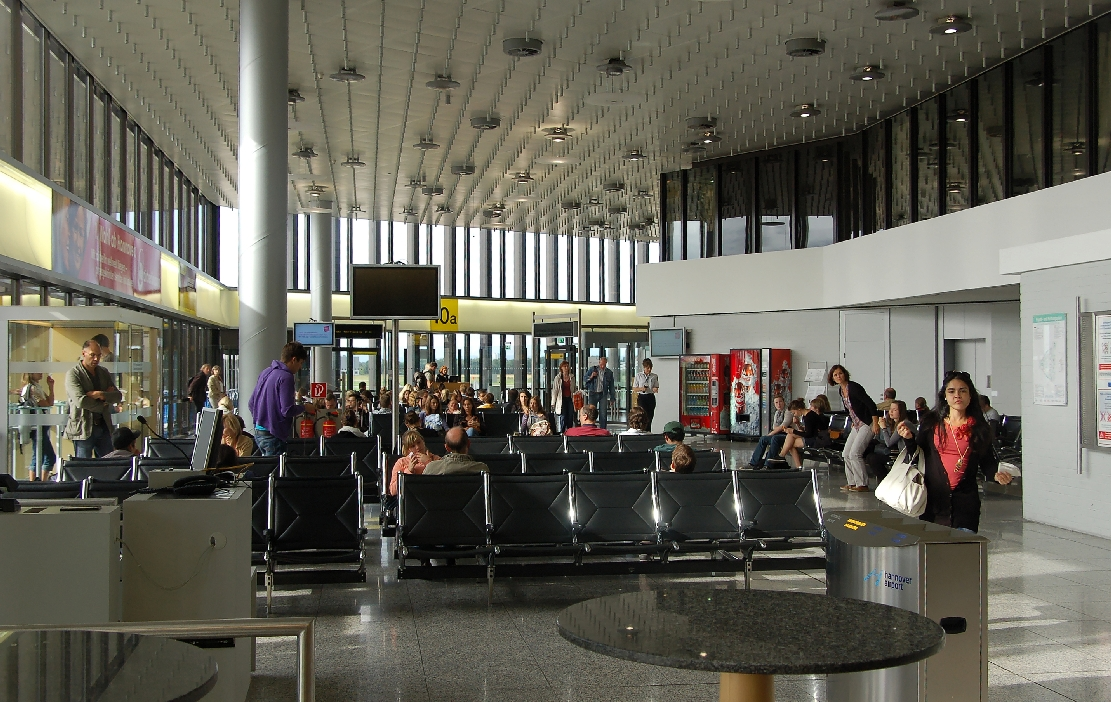
Departure area

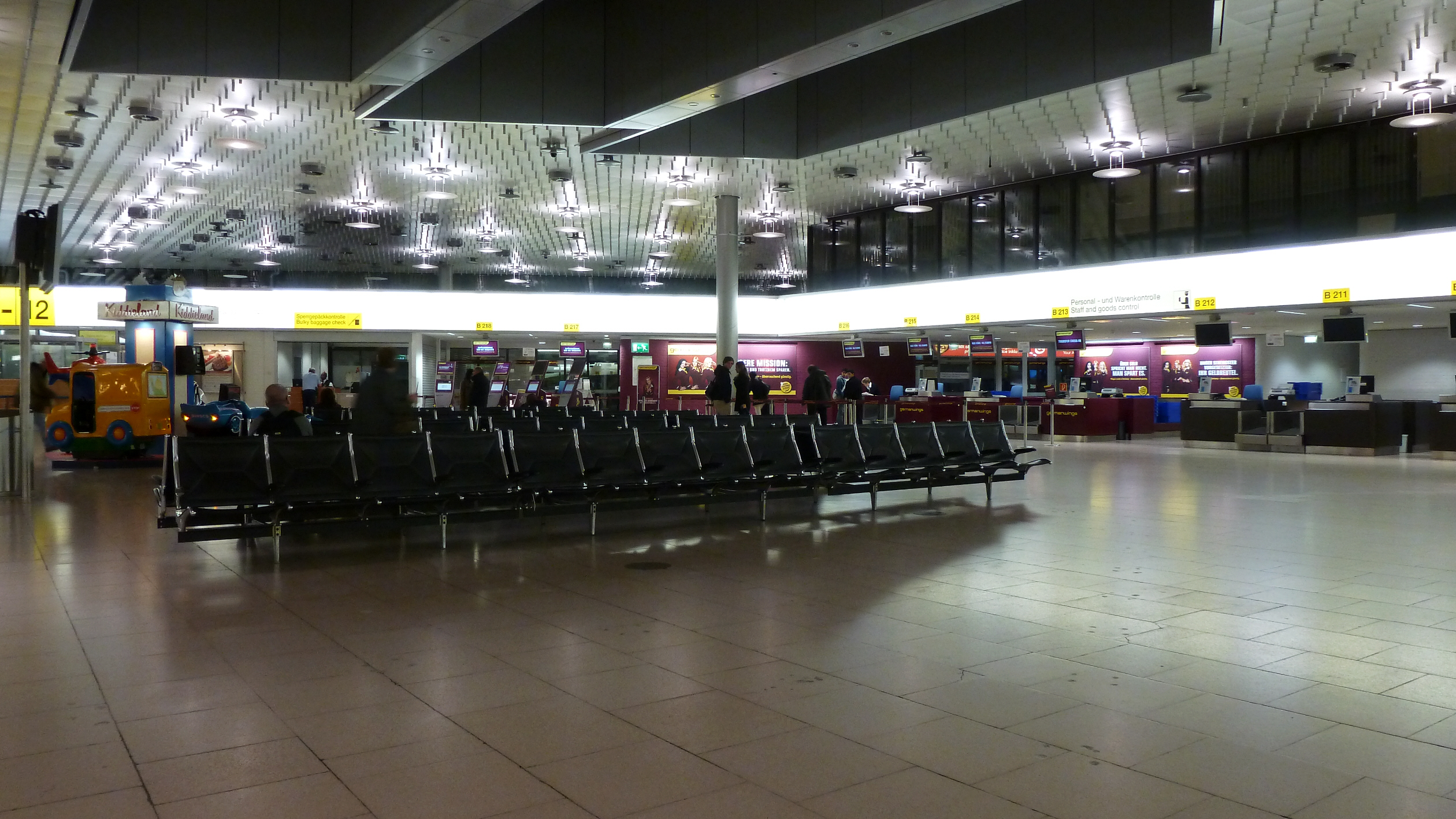
Check-in area

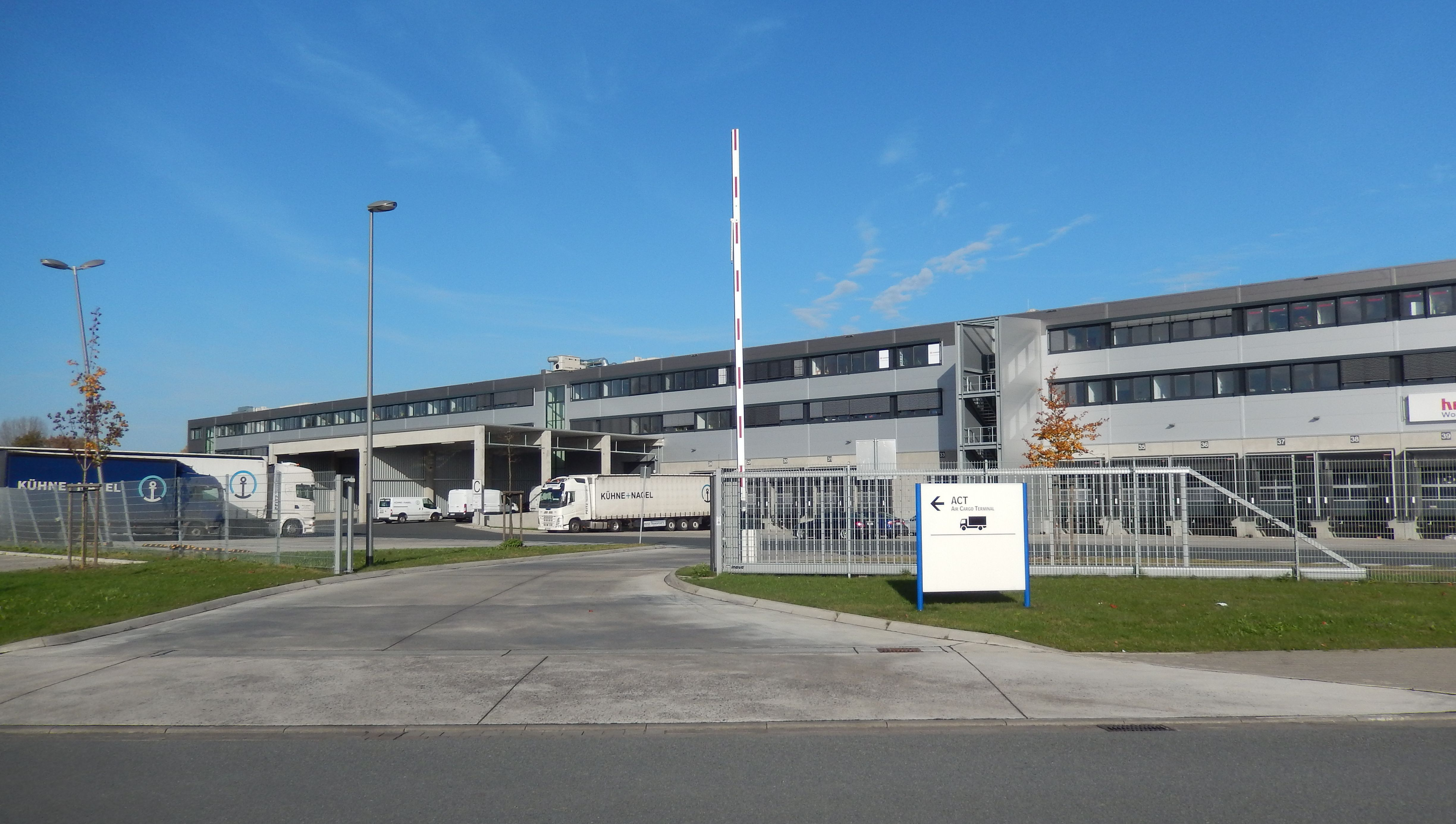
Cargo terminal

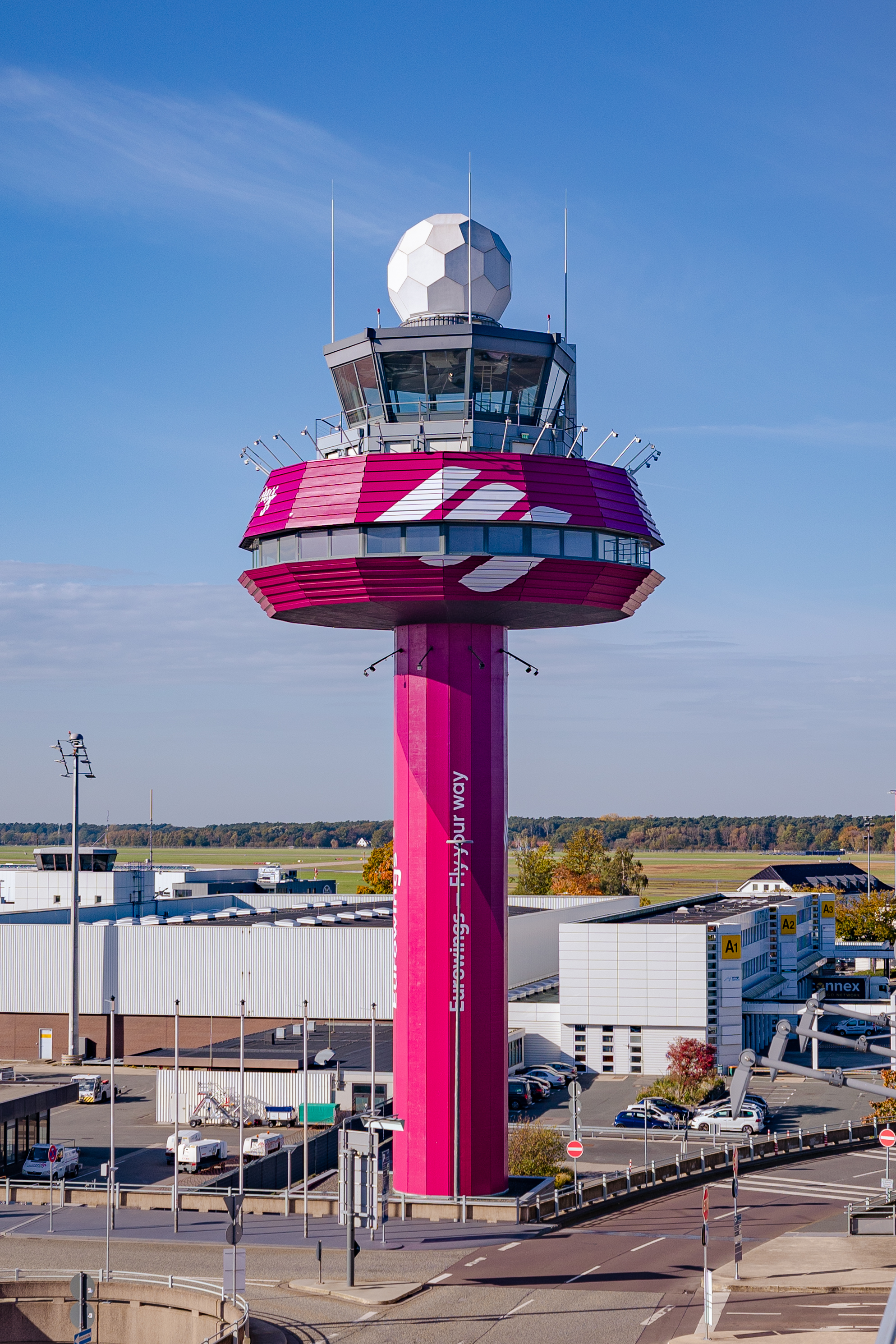
Former Hannover Airport tower

Annual Passenger Traffic
Year	Passengers	% Change
2000	5,530,284	Steady
2001	5,157,558	▼ -6.7%
2002	4,751,921	▼ -7.8%
2003	5,044,870	▲6.1%
2004	5,249,169	▲4.0%
2005	5,637,385	▲7.4%
2006	5,699,299	▲1.1%
2007	5,644,582	▼ -1%
2008	5,637,517	▼ -0.1%
2009	4,969,799	▼ -11.8%
2010	5,059,800	▲2%
2011	5,340,264	▲5.5%
2012	5,287,831	▼ -1%
2013	5,234,909	▼ -1%
2014	5,291,981	▲1%
2015	5,452,669	▲3%
2016	5,408,814	▼ -1%
2017	5,870,104	▲8.5%
2018	6,324,634	▲7.7%
2019	6,301,366	▼ -0.4%
2020	1,452,333	▼ -76.9%
2021	2,057,452	▲ +41.7%
2022	3,961,983	▲ +92.5
2023	4,599,823	▲ +16.1
2024	5,223,745	▲ +13.56

== Ground transportation ==
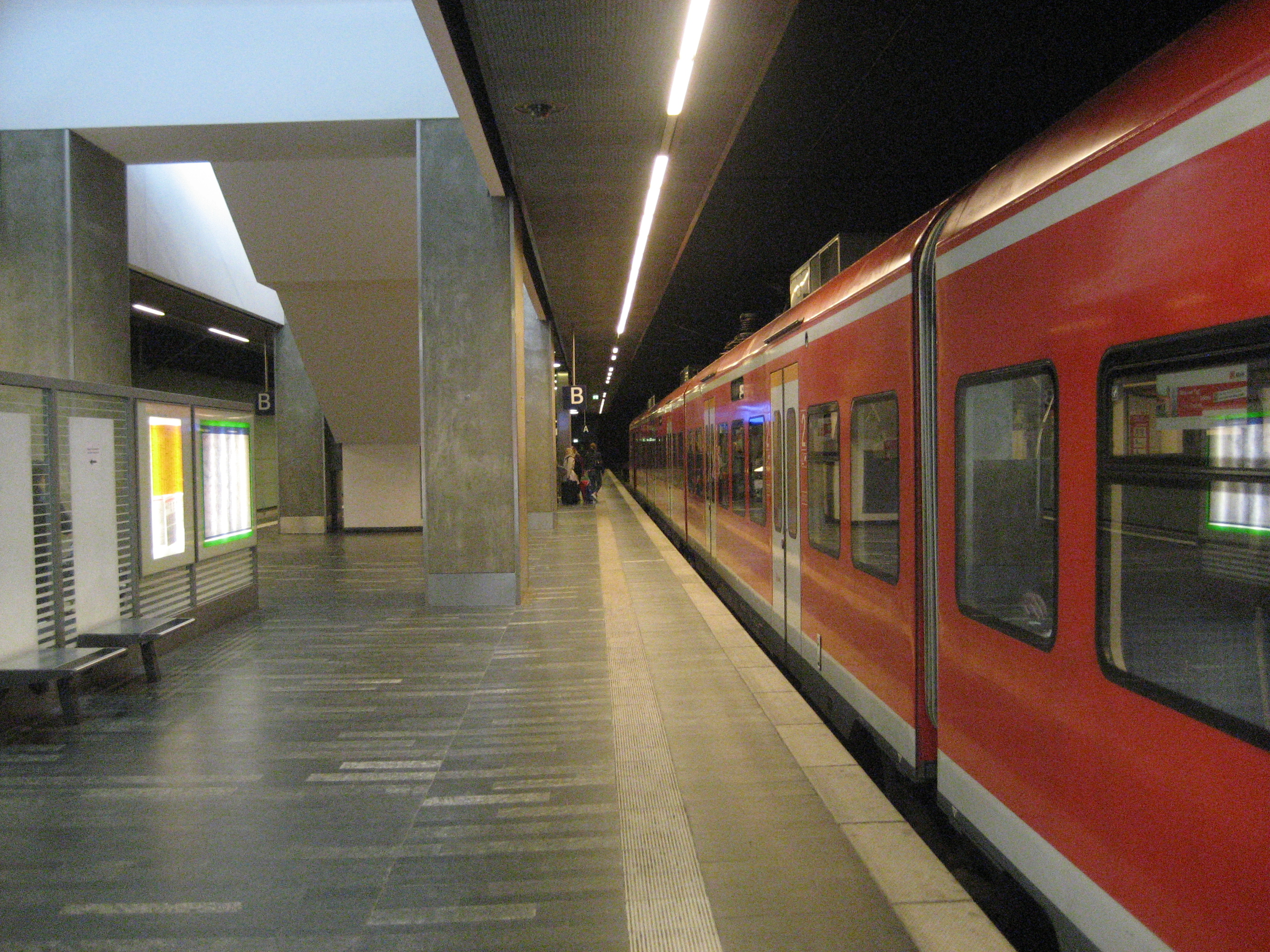
Hannover Airport railway station

=== Train ===
Hannover Flughafen railway station is located beneath terminal C and features frequent services of Hanover S-Bahn line S5 to the city centre of Hanover. The service runs every 30 minutes for 22 hours a day, and takes approximately 17 minutes. During important fairs like the Hanover Fair, additional hourly services of Hanover S-Bahn line S8 link the airport with the Hanover fairground.

=== Bus ===
The 470 bus runs directly from the Langenhagen-Zentrum station to Hannover Airport.

=== Car ===
Hannover Airport has its own exit on autobahn A352, but can also be reached via local roads. Approximately 14,000 parking spaces are available.

== Incidents ==
- On 30 August 1939, a Lufthansa Junkers Ju 52 crashed after takeoff. All seven occupants died.
- On 26 May 1988, a Fokker F-27 Friendship operated byStar Air A/S crashed on approach to Hannover when the flaps were fully extended and the aircraft pitched up violently causing a cargo shift. Both occupants died.

== See also ==
- Transport in Germany
- List of airports in Germany
