= Maastricht Aachen Airport =

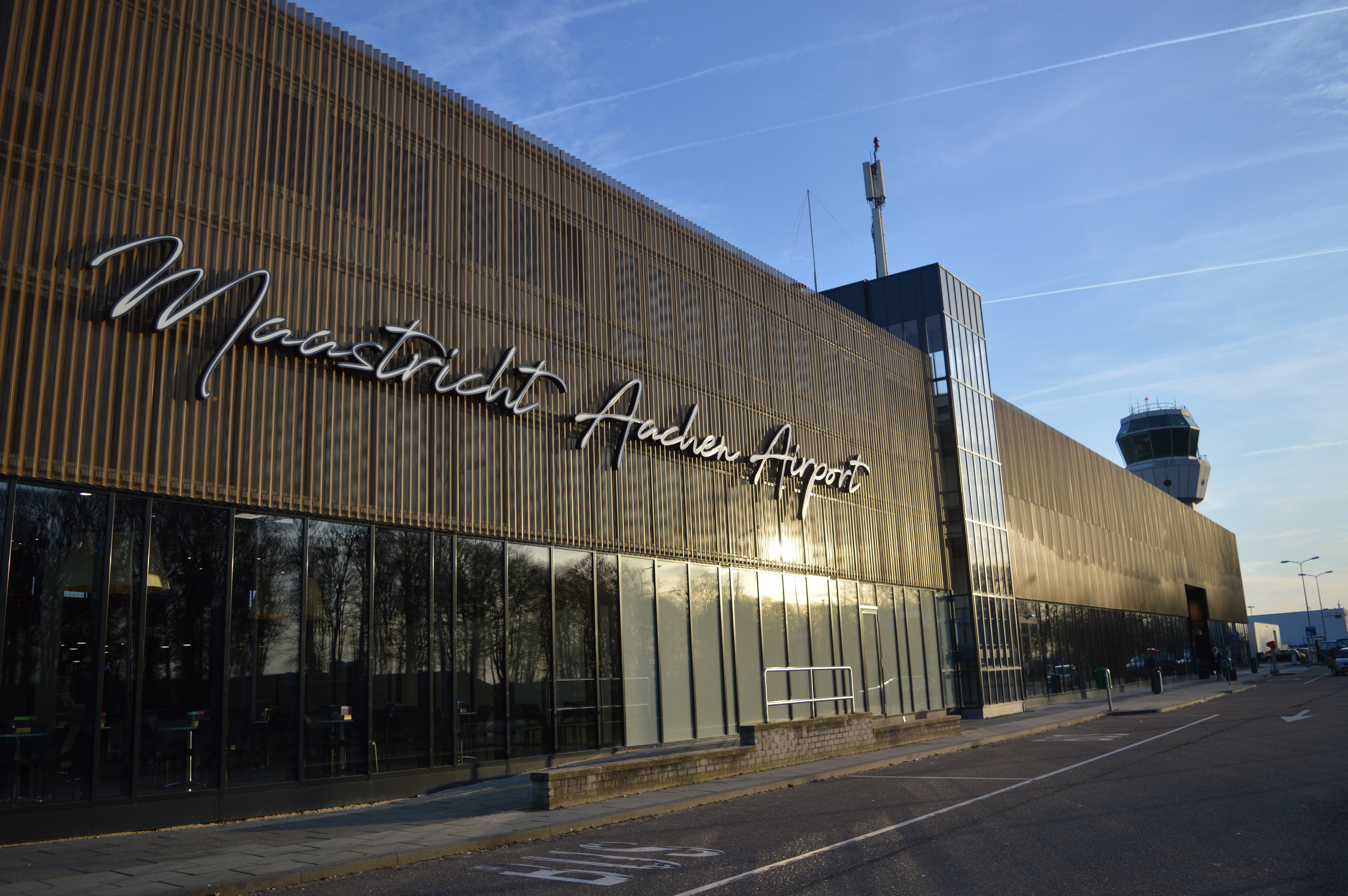
- IATA: MST; ICAO: EHBK

Summary
- Airport type: Public
- Owner: Schiphol Group (40%); Province of Limburg (60%)
- Operator: Maastricht Aachen Airport BV
- Serves: Maastricht, the Netherlands, Aachen, Germany, and Euregio Meuse-Rhine
- Location: Beek, Limburg, the Netherlands
- Elevation AMSL: 375 ft (114 m)
- Coordinates: 50°54′57″N 005°46′37″E
- Website: www.maa.nl

Map
- Location of airport in Netherlands

Runways
Direction	Length		Surface
Direction	m	ft	Surface
03/21	2,500	8,200	Asphalt

Statistics (2024)
- Passengers: 230,932 ▲ (estimated)
- Cargo (tonnes): 29,448 ▼ (estimated)
- Source: Statistics Netherlands

Maastricht Aachen Airport (IATA: MST, ICAO: EHBK) is a major cargo hub and regional passenger airport in Beek in Limburg, the Netherlands, located 5 NM (9.3 km; 5.8 mi) northeast of Maastricht and 15 NM (28 km; 17 mi) northwest of Aachen, Germany. It is the second-largest hub for cargo flights in the Netherlands. As of 2024, the airport had a passenger throughput of 230,932 and handled 29,448 tons of cargo.

The Maastricht Upper Area Control Centre (MUAC) of the European Organisation for the Safety of Air Navigation (EUROCONTROL) is also located at the airport.

== History ==
=== Pre-World War II ===
Plans for an airport in southern Limburg date back as far as 1919, with various locations being considered. Years of debate among various municipalities over the location and funding of the airport delayed its construction. In July 1939, the Limburg provincial government agreed to financially back the airport, however, the start of World War II meant the plans were put on hold once more.

=== Advanced Landing Ground Y-44 ===
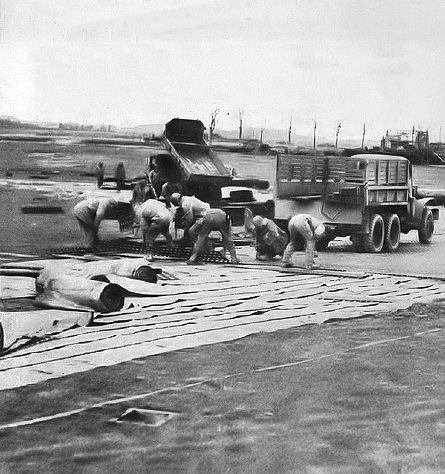
IX Engineering Command constructing an advanced landing ground

After the allied invasion of Normandy, the USAAF Ninth Air Force, specifically the IX Engineer Command, was tasked with constructing temporary airfields close to the advancing front. The area around Maastricht was liberated in 1944. In October 1944, the advance headquarters of the XIX Tactical Air Command and the 84th and 303rd Fighter Wings were moved to Maastricht to keep up with the Ninth Army.

Because of the proximity to the new headquarters, the decision was made to create a temporary airfield between the towns of Beek, Geulle and Ulestraten. Several orchards which had suffered damage from a tank battle were commandeered and cleared. Rubble from the nearby town of Geleen, which had been unintentionally bombed in 1942, was used to level the area.

The runway was 5,565 feet (1,696 m) and reinforced with pierced steel planks.

The field was built in less than 2 months and was operational on 22 March 1945, and was designated Y-44.

The first unit to be based at the field was the 31st Tactical Reconnaissance Squadron, flying the F-6, a reconnaissance version of the P-51 Mustang. The unit arrived on 22 March 1945.

As Nazi Germany was rapidly collapsing, the front was already well into Germany by the time the field was ready, and no direct combat sorties were operated from Y-44. 31st TRS was moved to Y-80 near Wiesbaden on 19 April 1945.

==== Units operating at the field ====
- 31st Tactical Reconnaissance Squadron, North American F-6 Mustang (22 March 1945 – 19 April 1945 )
- 39th Photographic Reconnaissance Squadron, Lockheed F-5 Lightning (2 April 1945 – 20 April 1945)
- 67th Tactical Reconnaissance Group
  - 155th Photographic Reconnaissance Squadron (Night), Douglas F-3 (4 April 1945 – 10 July 1945)
- 387th Bombardment Group (Medium)
  - 556, 557, 558 and 559th Squadrons, Martin B-26 Marauder (4 May 1945) – 30 May 1945

=== After World War II ===
Authority over what was to become known as Beek airfield (vliegveld Beek), was officially transferred to the Dutch government on 1 August 1945. It was decided to keep it open rather than re-open the pre-war debate over the location of an airport in the Maastricht area. The first civilian aircraft landed on 26 September 1945 and were operated by the Regeeringsvliegdienst, a government service with the purpose of carrying government officials and other people with urgent business, because the war had left many roads and railroads heavily damaged. The service used six de Havilland Dragon Rapides made available by the British government.

In 1946, the service was taken over by KLM, using Douglas DC-3 Dakotas. However, as repairs to the Dutch infrastructure progressed, demand for the service dropped and it was stopped in 1949. The first semi-permanent airport terminal was completed in 1947. The runway was paved in 1949, and a second paved runway was completed in 1950. In 1951, an agreement between the airport and the Dutch Air Force allowed for rapid expansion of the facilities. Runway 04/22 was lengthened to 1,850 m (6,070 ft), and permanent runway lighting was installed in 1960.

=== 1950s and 1960s ===
The late 1950s and early 1960s brought significant expansion in commercial operations at the airport. Operators included KLM, Airnautical, Skytours, Euravia, Tradair and Transair. The airport was also used as an intermediate stop for services from London and Manchester to Switzerland, Austria, Italy and Yugoslavia. A local airline based at the airport, Limburg Airways, had a contract with the International Herald Tribune for distributing the newspaper's European edition, which was printed in Paris. Limburg Airways was taken over by Martin's Air Charter (now Martinair) in 1962.

A promotion campaign by the Dutch tourist board for the nearby town of Valkenburg aan de Geul, aimed at British tourists, was highly successful and brought services by Invicta Airlines, Britannia and Channel Airways.

Domestic travel picked up as well, and newly created NLM CityHopper started to operate a service between Maastricht and Amsterdam Schiphol in 1966. The service would continue after KLM acquired NLM in 1992, and would last until 2008. When it was cancelled, it was the last remaining domestic service in the Netherlands.

An ILS system, which allows landings in poor weather, was built in 1967, for runway 22 only.

=== 1970s ===
In 1973, the airport was expanded again to handle bigger aircraft. The main runway was lengthened to 2500 m (8,200 ft), taxiways were widened, and aprons were enlarged. This mostly offset the negative effects of the 1973 oil crisis, passenger volume remained the same and cargo operations expanded.

The international air traffic control area control centre for EUROCONTROL was built at the airport. It started operations on March 1, 1972.

=== 1980s ===
Around 1980, the airport changed its name to "Maastricht Airport". In 1983, the aging passenger terminal and air traffic control tower were replaced by new buildings The new terminal was later expanded and is still in use as of 2010.

On 14 May 1985, Pope John Paul II held an open-air mass for 50,000 people at the airport, as part of his visit to the Netherlands.

==== Plan for an east–west runway ====
In 1981, a development plan for the airport recommended constructing a 3,500m east–west runway to facilitate growth in cargo operations, particularly during the night hours. The new runway would greatly reduce noise impact over the towns of Beek, Meerssen and the city of Maastricht. Although some night operations are allowed (including distribution of the European edition of The Wall Street Journal), runway length limits intercontinental operations. The Dutch government initially approved plans for the runway in 1985, however, the new runway would mean increased noise over other towns and parts of Belgium as well, and the final decision was delayed. As the new east–west runway would require substantial investment, it would only be profitable if night operations were permitted and increasingly the debate became focused on whether or not night flights should be allowed. Successive cabinets could not reach a final decision, and in 1998, after some 25 years of debate and postponement, the plan was aborted altogether.

=== 1990–2009 ===
In 1992, the Belgian town of Tongeren became shareholder of the airport. Two years later, the board of trade or chamber of commerce of the nearby German city of Aachen became shareholder. This interest eventually became prominent and in October 1994 the airport's name was changed to "Maastricht-Aachen Airport".

In July 2004, a 100% share in the airport was acquired by OmDV, a consortium of airport investment company Omniport and the construction company Dura Vermeer, making it the first fully privatised airport in the Netherlands.

Substantial investments in the airport infrastructure have been made since the privatization. Between August and October 2005, the runway was resurfaced and renamed to 03/21 (from 04/22) to compensate for changes in the Earth's magnetic field. The airport originally had two runways; the second (shorter, 1,080 m (3,540 ft)) runway (07/25) was closed and removed to make room for a new cargo terminal and additional aircraft maintenance facilities. Construction of the new facilities started in April 2008.

On 7 May 2005, Air Force One carrying US president George W. Bush landed at the airport. Bush visited the Netherlands American Cemetery in nearby Margraten the next day.

The instrument landing system (ILS) for runway 21 was upgraded to category III in 2008, which allows landings in very low visibility conditions. Amsterdam Airport Schiphol is the only other airport in the Netherlands that has category III ILS.

=== 2010s ===
In March 2011, the airport was certified to handle the upcoming Boeing 747-8, as two of the airport's major airlines—Cargolux and AirBridge Cargo—have placed orders for this aircraft.

Ryanair announced on July 3, 2012, that Maastricht will become a new Ryanair base from December 2012, the first on Dutch soil, with one Boeing 737-800 being based at the airport and three new routes being launched: Dublin, London-Stansted and Treviso. In October of the same year, German low-cost airline Germanwings ended its flights to Berlin after already halving its flights a year prior. In the same month, start-up Dutch airline, Maastricht Airlines, announced plans to base six Fokker 50 aircraft at the airport, initially operating to Berlin, Munich, and Amsterdam, before adding Copenhagen, Paris Charles de Gaulle and Southend in 2014. This did not happen and the company declared bankruptcy.

In December 2013, a spokesperson of the airport confirmed the closure of the Ryanair base from March 2014, entailing the ending of the Bergamo, Brive, Dublin, London-Stansted and Málaga flights. Also in 2013, the airport was helped by the province with a 4.5 million euro contribution. The airport was very close to bankruptcy during this period. Later on, in March 2014, the same province of Limburg believed that closure was never an option. They decided that they would like to take over the airport.

In late 2015, also Transavia announced they would not return to Maastricht in the summer of 2016, at the same time Vueling announced a new route to Barcelona, however, this latter route was only short-lived.

In 2017, the Dutch holiday airline Corendon Dutch Airlines announced that it would open a base at the airport with one aircraft based in summer 2018. In late 2018, renovations started on the passenger terminal. Also, freight carriers as Emirates SkyCargo and Saudia Cargo found their way to the airport, while Turkish Airlines Cargo, Silk Way Airlines, and Sky Gates Airlines further expanded their operations in Maastricht. Meanwhile, both Corendon Dutch Airlines and Ryanair announced that they would expand their number of destinations. Corendon Dutch Airlines even based a second aircraft during the summer season.

=== 2020s ===
Following a record-breaking year in 2019 with 435,977 passengers, the pandemic abruptly ended the airport's positive trend. In the years after the pandemic, passenger traffic never recovered to the pre-pandemic level, and while cargo throughput remained relatively stable, a sharp drop occurred after 2022 without recovery in the years following. In 2023, the Royal Schiphol Group acquired 40% of the shares in the airport from the Province of Limburg. This strategic acquisition followed a vote by the Provincial Council of Limburg on whether to close the airport or not in November 2022.

Another major setback for the airport came in June 2025, when Ryanair announced that it would be ending its operations on October 26 due to rising costs at the airport, resulting in the termination of flights to Alicante, Bari, Girona, Porto, and Zadar. This was a significant loss for the airport, as the low-cost airline was its largest customer, accounting for the majority of all passenger traffic. A few months later, in September 2025, also Corendon Dutch Airlines announced it would not be returning to Maastricht and would focus on nearby airports in Belgium and Germany instead. As a reason, the airline stated it had been unsuccessful in attracting German passengers to Maastricht, as well as the more attractive financial and operational conditions at nearby airports.

As Ryanair and Corendon decided to leave the airport, Wizz Air announced it would be returning to Maastricht with flights to Bucharest, Chișinău, Katowice, Lublin, Podgorica and Tuzla. However, after several schedule revisions, only flights to Tuzla commenced as planned, while flights to Bucharest and Chișinău were cancelled after they had already been postponed. The flights to Katowice, Lublin, and Podgorica commenced as planned in March 2026.

In March 2026, both TUI fly Netherlands and Transavia announced that they will temporarily move a significant number of flights from Eindhoven Airport to Maastricht as the airport in Eindhoven will close for five months in February 2027 due to runway renovations.

From April to July 2027, Maastricht Aachen Airport will offer flights to Alicante, Ibiza, Malaga, Mallorca, Valencia, Gran Canaria, Tenerife, Faro, Crete, Kos, Rhodes, Zakynthos, Al Hoceima, Nador, Oujda, and Antalya.

== Airlines and destinations ==
=== Passenger ===
The following airlines operate regular scheduled and charter flights to and from Maastricht/Aachen:

Airlines	Destinations
TAROM	Charter: Bucharest
Transavia	Alicante (begins 1 February 2027), Faro (begins 1 February 2027), Gran Canaria (begins 1 February 2027), Heraklion (begins 1 February 2027),Ibiza (begins 1 February 2027),Malaga (begins 1 February 2027), Rhodes (begins 1 February 2027), Seville (begins 2 February 2027), Tenerife-South (begins 2 February 2027), Valencia (begins 1 February 2027) Zakynthos (begins 1 February 2027)
TUI fly Netherlands	Las Palmas (begins 2 February 2027), Hurghada (begins 3 February 2027), Nador (begins 2 February 2027), Oujda (begins 2 February 2027), Sal (begins 1 February 2027), Tenerife-South (begins 2 February 2027)
Wizz Air	Lublin, Katowice, Tuzla, Podgorica

=== Cargo ===
Airlines	Destinations
Atlas Air	Hong Kong, Miami
Avianca Cargo	Miami, Quito, Zaragoza
Emirates SkyCargo	Columbus–Rickenbacker, Dubai–Al Maktoum, Nairobi–Jomo Kenyatta, New York–JFK, Zaragoza
Ethiopian Cargo	Addis Ababa, Hong Kong, Jeddah, Muscat, Oslo
My Freighter Airlines	Almaty, Shanghai, Tashkent
Royal Jordanian Cargo	Amman–Queen Alia
Sky Vision Airlines	Larnaca
Turkish Cargo	Accra, Chicago–O'Hare, Istanbul, Miami, Nairobi–Jomo Kenyatta, Quito
Zimex Aviation	Birmingham, Dublin

== Statistics ==
Year	Passengers	Cargo
2006	270,086	54,000
2007	134,579 ▼	58,000 ▲
2008	231,824 ▲	55,000 ▲
2009	135,696 ▼	53,000 ▼
2010	226,635 ▲	62,000 ▲
2011	333,910 ▲	65,000 ▲
2012	305,439 ▼	52,000 ▼
2013	429,545 ▲	54,000 ▲
2014	241,473 ▼	57,000 ▲
2015	195,180 ▼	57,000
2016	176,562 ▼	60,000 ▲
2017	167,544 ▼	87,000 ▲
2018	274,986 ▲	125,000 ▲
2019	435,977 ▲	111,457 ▼
2020	81,080 ▼	135,985 ▲
2021	97,646 ▲	127,994 ▼
2022	266,032 ▲	108,218 ▼
2023	223,152 ▼	32,275 ▼
2024	230,932 ▲	29,448 ▼
2025	151,990 ▼	41,637 ▲

Source: Statistics Netherlands

=== Busiest routes ===
Busiest routes from Maastricht Aachen Airport (2024)
Rank	Airport	Passengers 2024
1	Antalya, Turkey	42,811
2	Alicante, Spain	39,240
3	Porto, Portugal	30,439
4	Bari, Italy	21,362
5	Girona, Spain	19,165

== Other facilities ==
Jet Center - Maastricht Aachen Airport (MAA) provides handling for general aviation aircraft. Jet Center operates from a hangar situated on the East side of the airport.

Maas Aviation has operated an aircraft painting facility at the airport since the late 1980s. In 2017 it doubled its capacity when it opened a second adjacent paint shop hangar.

Maastricht Upper Area Control Centre (MUAC) of the European Organisation for the Safety of Air Navigation (EUROCONTROL) is located next to the airport.

Samco Aircraft Maintenance B.V. operates from a hangar on the east side of the airport and supports a wide range of aircraft maintenance activities. Building work on a second adjacent hangar was completed in 2018.

Aviation Competence Centre (ACC) is a training organization for aircraft mechanics and is located at the airport.

== Facilities ==
A modern hotel operated by GR8 is located 50 metres from the terminal building The GR8 hotel opened 2021.

The airport has two car parks. P1 short/long term 'comfort' parking and P 2 long term parking.

There are several car rental companies at the airport with desks in the terminal.

== Ground transportation ==
=== Car ===
The airport is located along motorway A2, exit 50. Taxis are available at the airport.

=== Bus ===
There is bus service (line 30), operated by Arriva, running every 30 mins to Maastricht and Sittard. This line also covers the transport connections from the airport to the national rail network via Maastricht railway station and Sittard railway station.

KLM operates a bus connection service to Amsterdam Airport Schiphol via Maastricht railway station and Eindhoven Airport. Tickets to use this service are an add-on to a KLM flight ticket.

=== Bicycle ===
The airport is situated along the Sittard-Maastricht fast cycling route, which is designed to encourage more people to cycle.

== See also ==
- Advanced Landing Ground
