= Hurghada International Airport =

Airport serving Hurghada, Egypt

Hurghada International Airport مطار الغردقة الدولي
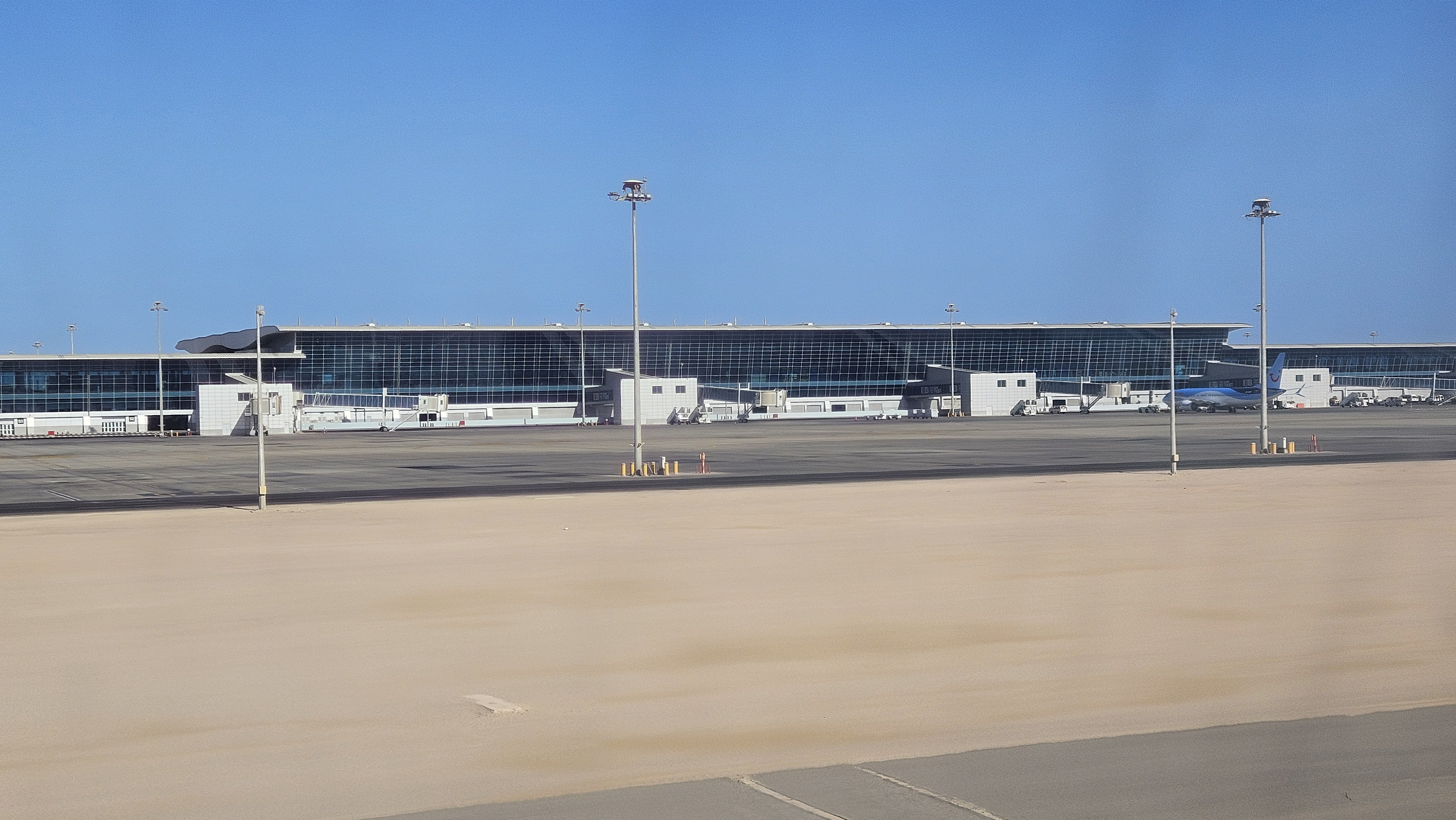
- IATA: HRG; ICAO: HEGN

Summary
- Airport type: Public
- Operator: Government
- Serves: Hurghada, Egypt
- Focus city for: Air Cairo
- Elevation AMSL: 52 ft (16 m)
- Coordinates: 27°10′41″N 33°47′57″E
- Website: hurghada-airport.com

Map
- Location of airport in Egypt HRG (Middle East)

Runways
Direction	Length		Surface
Direction	m	ft	Surface
16L/34R	4,000	13,123	Asphalt
16R/34L	4,000	13,123	Asphalt

Statistics (2024)
- Passengers: 9,636,689
- Source: DAFIF

Hurghada International Airport (IATA: HRG, ICAO: HEGN) is an international airport serving Hurghada, Egypt. It is located inland, 5 km (3.1 mi) southwest of El Dahar, the city centre of Hurghada. It is the second busiest airport in Egypt after Cairo International Airport, the 19th busiest airport in the Middle East and the 6th busiest airport in Africa.

== Terminal ==
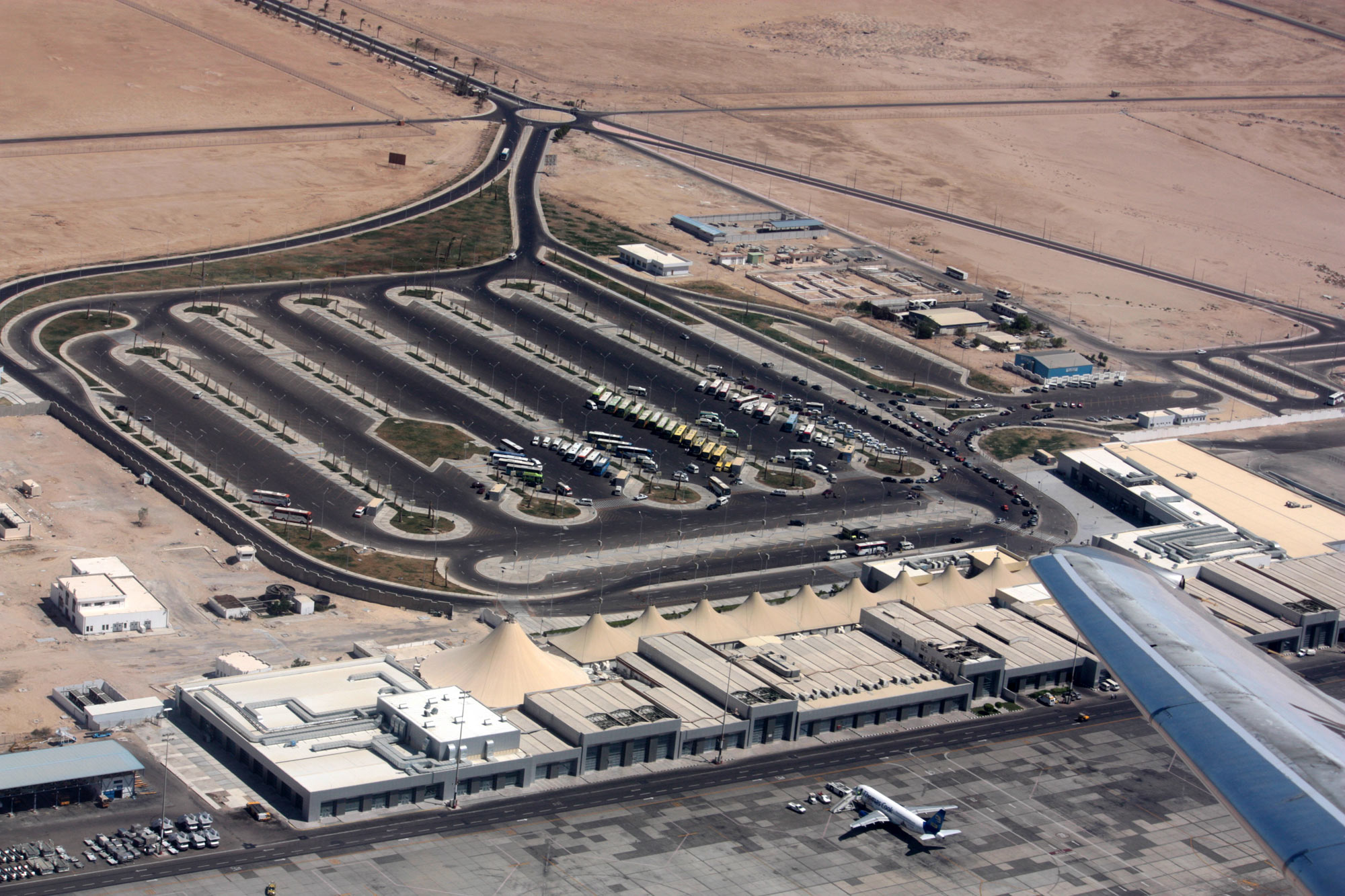
Aerial overview

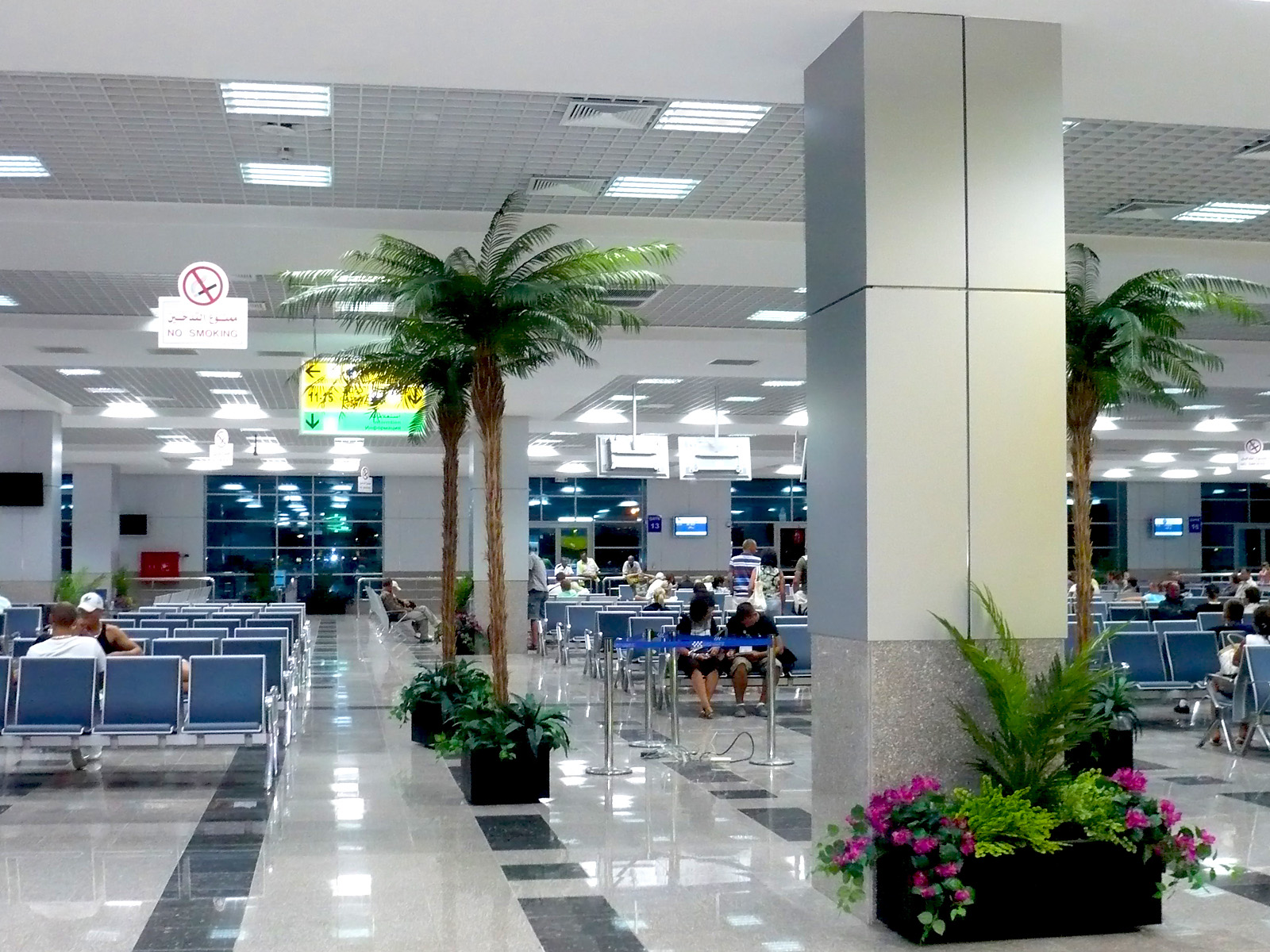
Departure area

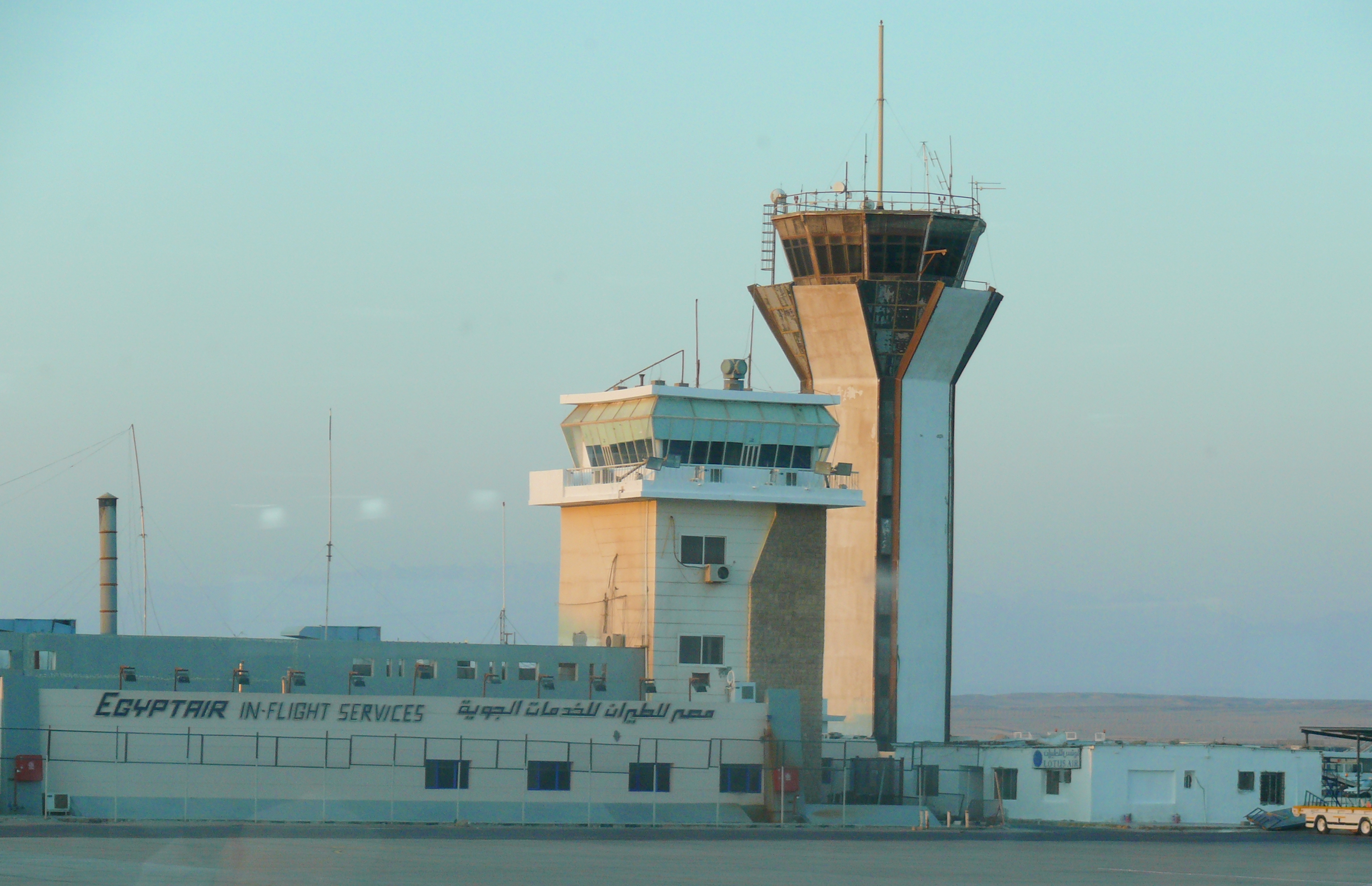
Control tower

The airport currently has two passenger terminals: Terminal 1 and Terminal 2. Construction of the new terminal complex cost $335 million, which was mainly financed by the Arab Fund for Economic Development. Egypt's aviation minister, Houssam Kamal, said that the airport would be able to host up to 13 million visitors annually. The project was inaugurated by President Abdel Fattah el-Sisi on 17 December 2014. The new terminal has a total area of 92,000 square metres on three levels. The departure hall has 72 check-in counters and 20 departure gates.

== Airlines and destinations ==
The following airlines operate regular scheduled and charter flights at Hurghada Airport:

Airlines	Destinations
Aeroflot	Krasnodar, Moscow–Sheremetyevo, Saint Petersburg
Air Algerie	Seasonal charter: Algiers
Air Astana	Seasonal charter: Almaty
Air Cairo	Basel/Mulhouse, Belgrade, Berlin, Bratislava, Budapest, Cairo, Cologne/Bonn, Düsseldorf, Frankfurt, Hamburg, Hannover, Istanbul (resumes 26 December 2026), Leipzig/Halle, Luxor, Milan–Malpensa, Mombasa (begins 25 December 2026), Munich, Naples, Prague, Sarajevo, Sharm El Sheikh, Skopje, Stuttgart, Vienna, Yerevan, Zürich; Seasonal: Aalborg (begins 21 December 2026), Amman–Queen Alia, Aswan, Banja Luka, Bilbao, Copenhagen, Dresden, Erfurt-Weimar, Lisbon, Málaga, Moscow–Sheremetyevo, Oslo, Paderborn/Lippstadt, Rome–Fiumicino (begins 25 December 2026), Saint Petersburg, Valencia, Yekaterinburg
Air Serbia	Seasonal charter: Belgrade, Niš
AirBaltic	Seasonal: Riga
AJet	Istanbul–Sabiha Gökçen
AlMasria Universal Airlines	Seasonal charter: Chelyabinsk, Kazan, Moscow–Domodedovo, Perm, Volgograd, Wrocław
Azur Air	Seasonal charter: Perm
Belavia	Seasonal charter: Homiel, Minsk
BH Air	Seasonal charter: Sofia
Brussels Airlines	Seasonal: Brussels
Chair Airlines	Zürich
Condor	Düsseldorf, Frankfurt, Munich, Münster/Osnabrück (begins 4 November 2026), Stuttgart; Seasonal: Berlin
Corendon Airlines	Cologne/Bonn, Düsseldorf, Hamburg, Vienna; Seasonal: Salzburg, Stuttgart
Corendon Dutch Airlines	Seasonal: Amsterdam, Groningen, Maastricht
Discover Airlines	Seasonal: Frankfurt, Munich
EasyJet	Belfast–International, Bristol, Glasgow, Liverpool, London–Gatwick, London–Luton, Manchester; Seasonal: Amsterdam, Basel/Mulhouse, Berlin, Birmingham, Edinburgh, Geneva, Lyon, Milan–Malpensa, Nantes, Naples, Paris–Charles de Gaulle
Edelweiss Air	Zurich
Egyptair	Cairo; Seasonal: Budapest, Moscow–Domodedovo, Prague
Eurowings	Düsseldorf; Seasonal: Berlin, Cologne, Graz, Hamburg, Hannover, Prague, Salzburg, Stuttgart
Finnair	Seasonal charter: Helsinki
Fly Lili	Seasonal charter: Bucharest–Băneasa
Flynas	Seasonal: Jeddah, Riyadh
GetJet Airlines	Seasonal charter: Riga, Tallinn, Vilnius
HiSky	Seasonal charter: Chișinău
ITA Airways	Seasonal charter: Milan–Malpensa
Jazeera Airways	Seasonal: Kuwait City
Jet2.com	Birmingham (begins 13 February 2027), East Midlands (begins 13 February 2027), Glasgow (begins 11 February 2027), Leeds/Bradford (begins 14 February 2027), London–Gatwick (begins 12 February 2027), London–Stansted (begins 12 February 2027), Manchester (begins 14 February 2027)
Luxair	Luxembourg
Marabu	Cologne/Bonn, Munich; Seasonal: Berlin, Hamburg
Nesma Airlines	Basel/Mulhouse; Seasonal charter: Moscow–Vnukovo, Saint Petersburg, Saratov, Volgograd
Nile Air	Cairo; Seasonal charter: Prague, Vienna
Norwegian Air Shuttle	Seasonal: Copenhagen, Gothenburg, Helsinki, Oslo, Stockholm–Arlanda
Pegasus Airlines	Istanbul–Sabiha Gökçen
Red Sea Airlines	Seasonal charter: Erfurt-Weimar, Moscow–Vnukovo
Red Wings Airlines	Seasonal charter: Moscow–Domodedovo, Moscow–Sheremetyevo
Rossiya Airlines	Seasonal charter: Chelyabinsk, Kazan, Nizhny Novogorod, Moscow–Sheremetyevo, Perm, Samara, Ufa, Yekaterinburg
Scandinavian Airlines	Seasonal charter: Oslo, Stockholm–Arlanda
SCAT Airlines	Seasonal charter: Almaty, Astana
Saudia	Seasonal: Jeddah
SkyUp	Seasonal charter: Bucharest–Otopeni, Cluj-Napoca, Gdańsk, Katowice, Poznań, Riga, Tallinn, Vilnius, Warsaw–Chopin, Wrocław, Yerevan
Smartwings	Prague; Seasonal: Brno, Ostrava; Seasonal charter: Bratislava, Budapest, Katowice, Poznan, Warsaw–Chopin
Sunclass Airlines	Seasonal charter: Copenhagen, Gothenburg, Helsinki, Oslo, Stockholm–Arlanda
Sundair	Berlin, Dresden
Sunday Airlines	Seasonal charter: Almaty, Astana
Swiss International Air Lines	Seasonal: Geneva
TAROM	Seasonal charter: Bucharest–Otopeni, Cluj-Napoca, Iași, Timișoara
Transavia	Seasonal: Amsterdam, Bordeaux, Lyon, Marseille, Nantes, Paris–Orly
TUI Airways	Birmingham, Bristol, Cardiff, East Midlands, London–Gatwick, Manchester, Newcastle upon Tyne
TUI fly Belgium	Brussels; Seasonal: Ostend/Bruges
TUI fly Deutschland	Düsseldorf, Frankfurt, Hannover, Munich, Stuttgart
TUI fly Netherlands	Amsterdam, Eindhoven
Turkish Airlines	Istanbul (Suspended)
Ural Airlines	Seasonal charter: Kazan, Moscow–Domodedovo, Samara, Sochi, Yekaterinburg
Uzbekistan Airways	Tashkent
Wizz Air	Bratislava, Katowice, Rome–Fiumicino, Warsaw–Modlin, Wrocław; Seasonal: Budapest, London–Luton, Naples (begins 2 December 2026),

== See also ==
- List of the busiest airports in the Middle East
