= Corendon Airlines =

Airline of Turkey

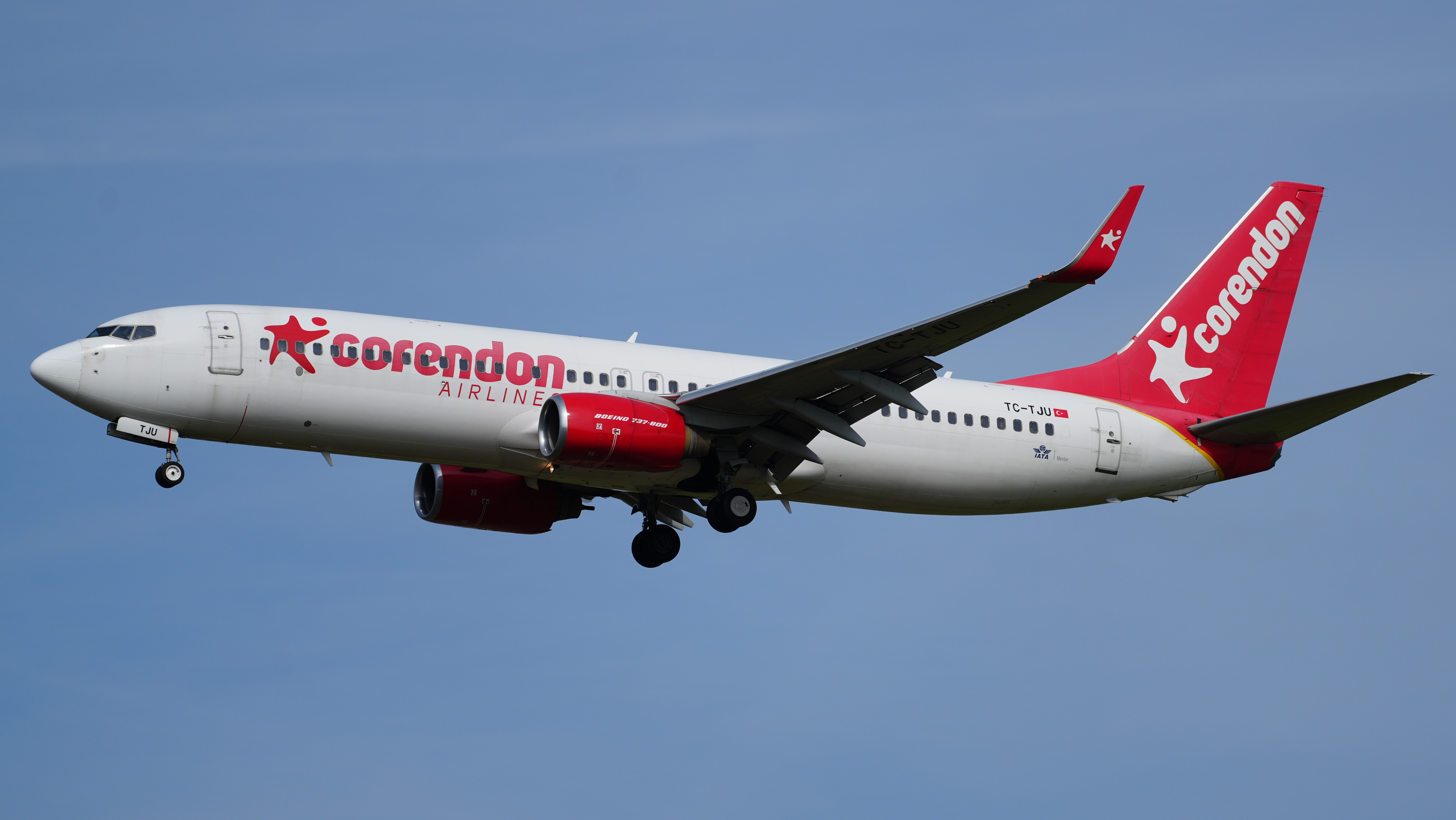
- Corendon Airlines Boeing 737-800
IATA	ICAO	Call sign
XC	CAI	CORENDON
- Founded: November 2004; 21 years ago
- Operating bases: Antalya Airport; İzmir Adnan Menderes Airport; Ankara Esenboğa Airport
- Subsidiaries: Corendon Dutch Airlines; Corendon Airlines Europe
- Fleet size: 15
- Destinations: 144
- Parent company: Corendon Tourism Group
- Headquarters: Antalya, Turkey
- Key people: Yildiray Karaer (CEO) Atilay Uslu (Chairman)
- Revenue: $535.78 million (2023)
- Employees: 1,283 (2023)
- Website: www.corendonairlines.com

Corendon Airlines (legally Turistik Hava Taşımacılık A.Ş.) (Turkish pronunciation: [koˈɾændon], Dutch pronunciation: [koːˈrɛndɔn]) is a Turkish leisure airline headquartered in Antalya, Turkey. A subsidiary of the Corendon Tourism Group, it was founded in 2004 and began operations in 2005. The airline operates scheduled and charter flights to over 140 destinations in Europe, the Middle East, and North Africa, with hubs at Antalya Airport and İzmir Adnan Menderes Airport. As of May 2025, Corendon Airlines operates a fleet of 17 aircraft and has two European sister carriers: Corendon Dutch Airlines and Corendon Airlines Europe. It maintains partnerships with TUI Airways and Hahn Air.

== History ==
Corendon Airlines was founded in 2004 with flight operations starting in April 2005. The Dutch sister company Corendon Dutch Airlines was founded in 2011 and the Maltese sister company Corendon Airlines Europe was founded in 2017.

Corendon Airlines has continued to operate in Russia following the country's invasion of Ukraine. The airline announced the launch of charter flights from Perm to Antalya in May 2024.

== Destinations ==
As of May 2025, Corendon Airlines serves the following destinations shown here.

Country	City	Airport	Notes	Refs
Austria	Graz	Graz Airport	Seasonal	
Austria	Linz	Linz Airport	Seasonal	
Austria	Salzburg	Salzburg Airport	Seasonal	
Austria	Vienna	Vienna International Airport	Seasonal	
Belgium	Brussels	Brussels Airport	Seasonal	
Cyprus	Larnaca	Larnaca International Airport	Seasonal	
Czech Republic	České Budějovice	České Budějovice Airport	Seasonal charter	
Egypt	Hurghada	Hurghada International Airport		
Egypt	Marsa Alam	Marsa Alam International Airport	Seasonal	
France	Lyon	Lyon–Saint-Exupéry Airport	Terminated	
France	Paris	Charles de Gaulle Airport	Seasonal	
Germany	Berlin	Berlin Brandenburg Airport		
Germany	Bremen	Bremen Airport	Seasonal	
Germany	Cologne	Cologne Bonn Airport		
Germany	Dresden	Dresden Airport	Seasonal	
Germany	Düsseldorf	Düsseldorf Airport		
Germany	Erfurt	Erfurt–Weimar Airport		
Germany	Frankfurt	Frankfurt Airport	Seasonal	
Germany	Friedrichshafen	Friedrichshafen Airport	Seasonal	
Germany	Hamburg	Hamburg Airport		
Germany	Hanover	Hannover Airport		
Germany	Karlsruhe/Baden-Baden	Karlsruhe/Baden-Baden Airport	Seasonal	
Germany	Kassel	Kassel Airport	Terminated	
Germany	Leipzig	Leipzig Airport		
Germany	Munich	Munich Airport	Seasonal	
Germany	Munster	Münster Osnabrück Airport	Seasonal	
Germany	Nuremberg	Nuremberg Airport		
Germany	Paderborn	Paderborn Lippstadt Airport		
Germany	Rostock	Rostock–Laage Airport	Seasonal	
Germany	Saarbrücken	Saarbrücken Airport	Terminated	
Greece	Corfu	Corfu International Airport	Seasonal	
Greece	Heraklion	Heraklion International Airport "Nikos Kazantzakis"	Seasonal	
Greece	Kos	Kos International Airport	Seasonal	
Greece	Rhodes	Rhodes International Airport	Seasonal	
Israel	Tel Aviv	David Ben Gurion International Airport	Seasonal	
Kazakhstan	Astana	Nursultan Nazarbayev International Airport	Terminated	
Morocco	Nador	Nador International Airport	Seasonal	
Netherlands	Rotterdam	Rotterdam The Hague Airport	Seasonal	
Poland	Bydgoszcz	Bydgoszcz Ignacy Jan Paderewski Airport	Terminated	
Poland	Katowice	Katowice Airport		
Poland	Szczecin	Solidarity Szczecin–Goleniów Airport	Terminated	
Poland	Warsaw	Warsaw Chopin Airport	Seasonal	
Romania	Bucharest	Bucharest Henri Coandă International Airport	Seasonal	
Romania	Cluj-Napoca	Cluj International Airport	Seasonal	
Russia	Orenburg	Yuri Gagarin Orenburg International Airport	Seasonal charter	
Russia	Perm	Perm International Airport	Terminated	
Slovakia	Bratislava	Bratislava Airport	Seasonal	
Slovenia	Ljubljana	Ljubljana Airport	Seasonal	
Spain	Fuerteventura	Fuerteventura Airport		
Spain	Lanzarote	Lanzarote Airport		
Spain	Gran Canaria	Gran Canaria Airport		
Spain	Palma de Mallorca	Palma de Mallorca Airport	Seasonal	
Switzerland; France; Germany	Basel; Mulhouse; Freiburg	EuroAirport Basel Mulhouse Freiburg	Seasonal	
Switzerland	Zurich	Zurich Airport	Seasonal	
Turkey	Adana	Adana Şakirpaşa Airport	Airport Closed	
Turkey	Alanya	Gazipaşa–Alanya Airport	Seasonal	
Turkey	Ankara	Ankara Esenboğa Airport	Seasonal	
Turkey	Antalya	Antalya Airport	Hub	
Turkey	Bodrum	Milas–Bodrum Airport	Seasonal	
Turkey	Dalaman	Dalaman Airport	Seasonal	
Turkey	Diyarbakir	Diyarbakır Airport	Seasonal	
Turkey	Eskişehir	Hasan Polatkan Airport	Seasonal	
Turkey	Gaziantep	Gaziantep Oğuzeli Airport	Seasonal	
Turkey	Istanbul	Istanbul Airport	Future	
Turkey	İzmir	İzmir Adnan Menderes Airport	Hub	
Turkey	Kayseri	Erkilet International Airport	Seasonal	
Turkey	Konya	Konya Airport	Terminated	
Turkey	Samsun	Samsun-Çarşamba Airport	Seasonal	
Turkey	Trabzon	Trabzon Airport	Terminated	
Turkey	Zonguldak	Zonguldak Airport	Seasonal	
United Kingdom	Birmingham	Birmingham Airport	Seasonal	
United Kingdom	Bristol	Bristol Airport	Terminated	
United Kingdom	Glasgow	Glasgow Airport	Seasonal	
United Kingdom	London	Gatwick Airport	Seasonal	
United Kingdom	London	London Stansted Airport	Seasonal	
United Kingdom	Manchester	Manchester Airport	Seasonal	
United Kingdom	Newcastle upon Tyne	Newcastle International Airport	Seasonal	

=== Airline partnerships ===
Corendon Airlines currently has a codeshare partnership with TUI Airways and also an interline agreement with Hahn Air.

== Fleet ==
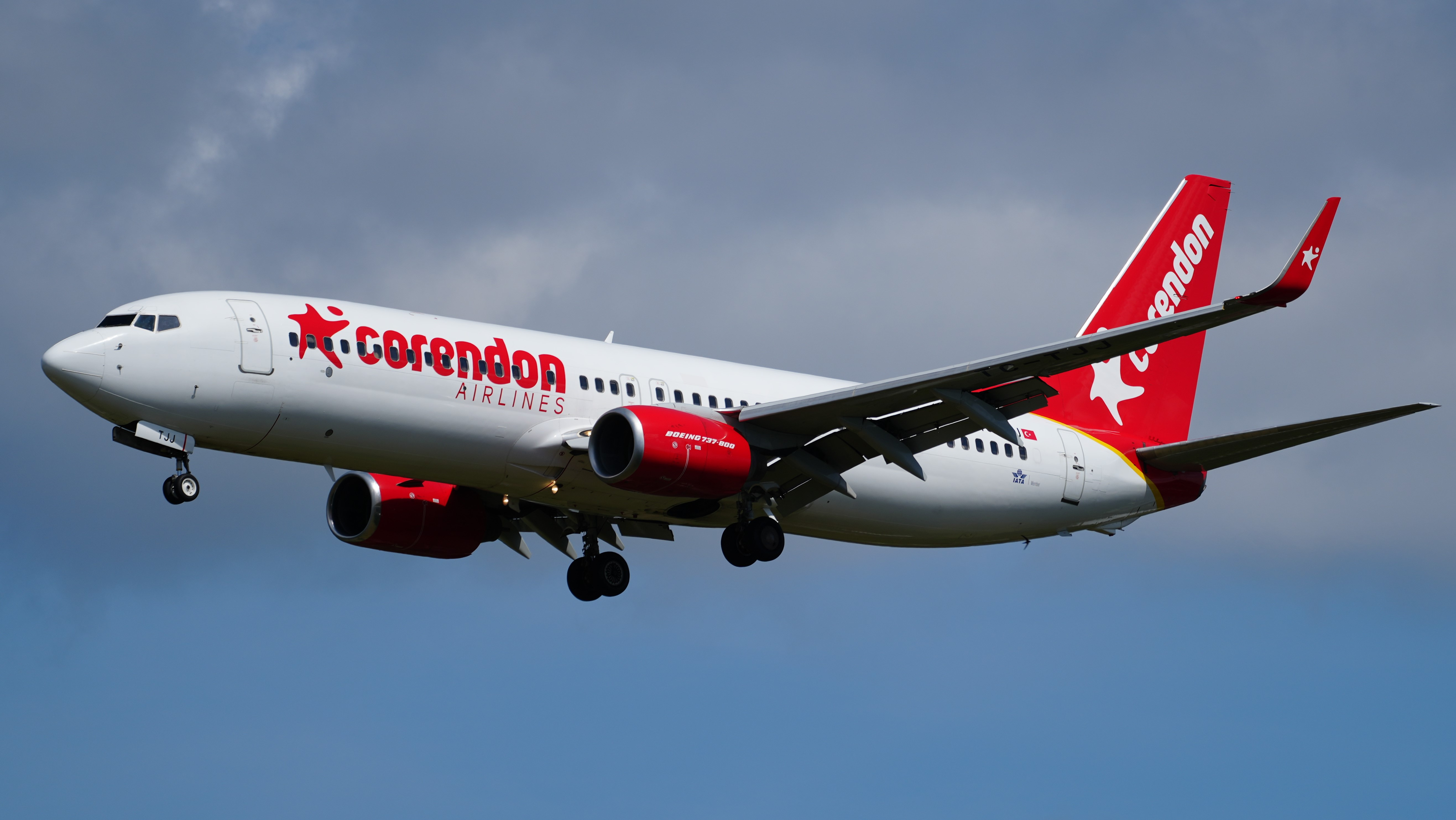
Corendon Airlines Boeing 737-800

=== Current fleet ===
As of August 2025, Corendon Airlines operates an all-Boeing 737 fleet composed of the following aircraft:

Aircraft	In service	Orders	Passengers	Notes
Boeing 737-800	9	—	189	
Boeing 737 MAX 8	6	—	189	
Total	15	—		

== Accidents and incidents ==
- On 2 October 2010 a Boeing 737-400 of Corendon Airlines overran runway 22 at Amsterdam Schiphol Airport and ended up with its nose gear in the mud after a flight from Dalaman.
- On 14 October 2012 Corendon Airlines Flight 733, a Boeing 737-800 operating between Antalya and Trondheim suffered a hull loss after the plane caught fire during pushback from the gate. 27 passengers were injured during the evacuation. The cause was determined to be a short circuit in the captain's cockpit panel near an oxygen tank.
