= Augai =

Populated place in ancient Cilicia

Coordinates: 36°34′16″N 31°51′47″E

Augai (Ancient Greek: Αὐγὰι) or Augae was a coastal town of ancient Pamphylia or of Cilicia, inhabited during Roman times. It was located 70 stadia from Aunesis.

Its site is tentatively located near Sarapşa, in Turkey.
