= Erkilet International Airport =

Airport in Kayseri, Turkey

Kayseri Erkilet Airport Kayseri Erkilet Havalimanı
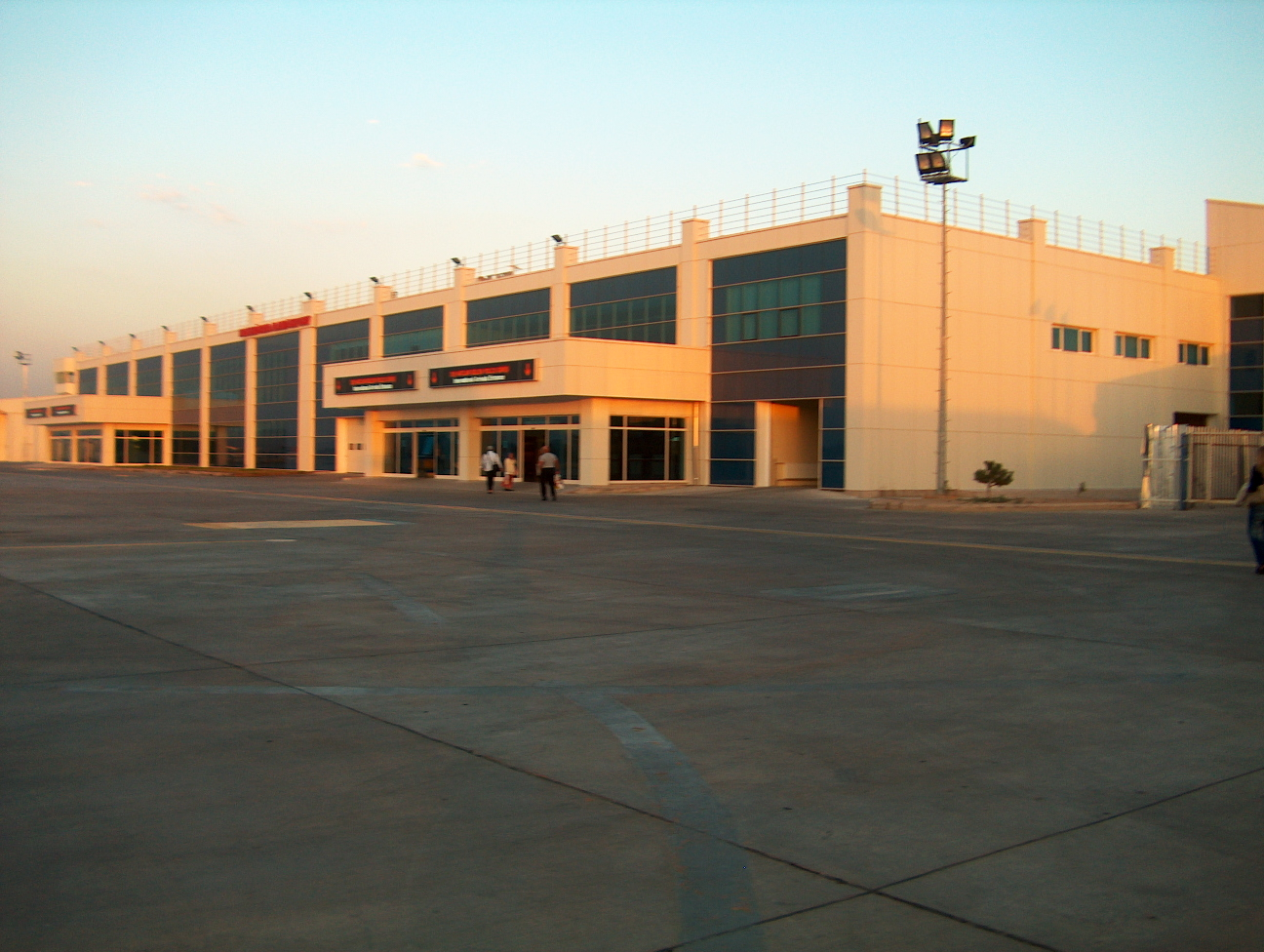
- IATA: ASR; ICAO: LTAU

Summary
- Airport type: Public / Military
- Operator: DHMİ (State Airports Administration); Turkish Air Force
- Serves: Kayseri, Turkey
- Location: Kocasinan, Kayseri, Turkey
- Opened: 15 November 1998; 27 years ago
- Operating base for: Pegasus Airlines, AJet
- Elevation AMSL: 3,506 ft (1,069 m)
- Coordinates: 38°46′13″N 035°29′43″E
- Website: www.dhmi.gov.tr/Sayfalar/Havalimani/Kayseri/AnaSayfa.aspx

Map
- Location of airport in Turkey ASR/LTAU (Asia)

Runways
Direction	Length		Surface
Direction	ft	m	Surface
07/25	9,841	3,000	Concrete

Statistics (2025)
- Annual passenger capacity: 6,000,000
- Passengers: 2,765,751
- Passenger change 2024–25: ▲6%
- Aircraft movements: 18,081
- Movements change 2024–25: ▲6%

Erkilet International Airport or Kayseri Erkilet Airport (IATA: ASR, ICAO: LTAU) is a military airbase and public airport located 5 km (3.1 mi) north of Kayseri in the Kayseri Province of Turkey. The airport is a major hub for travel to Cappadocia.

== Facilities ==
The prior capacity of the airport was 600,000 passengers per year. With the opening of the new international terminal in March 2007, its total capacity increased up to one million passengers per year. The airport is able to accommodate jets the size of the Boeing 747. However, smaller jets like the Boeing 737 and Airbus A320 more commonly seen there.

== Airlines and destinations ==
The following airlines operate regular scheduled and charter flights at Erkilet Airport

Airlines	Destinations
AJet	Istanbul–Sabiha Gökçen; Seasonal: Munich, Stuttgart
Corendon Airlines	Seasonal: Cologne/Bonn, Düsseldorf, Hannover, Nuremberg, Rotterdam/The Hague
Eurowings	Seasonal: Cologne/Bonn
Pegasus Airlines	Antalya, Düsseldorf, Ercan, Istanbul–Sabiha Gökçen, Izmir, Lyon, Rotterdam/The Hague, Stuttgart; Seasonal: Amsterdam, Cologne/Bonn
Smartwings	Seasonal charter: Prague
SunExpress	Amsterdam, Antalya, Düsseldorf, Frankfurt, Hannover, Izmir, Munich, Stuttgart; Seasonal: Basel/Mulhouse, Berlin, Brussels, Cologne/Bonn, Geneva, London–Stansted, Prague, Rotterdam/The Hague, Vienna
TUI fly Belgium	Seasonal: Brussels
Turkish Airlines	Istanbul

== Statistics ==
Kayseri–Erkilet International Airport Passenger Traffic Statistics
Year (months)	Domestic	% change	International	% change	Total	% change
2025	2,216,868	▲8%	548,883	▲1%	2,765,751	▲6%
2024	2,060,857	▲9%	542,587	▲16%	2,603,444	▲11%
2023	1,885,345	▲9%	466,307	▼15%	2,351,652	▲3%
2022	1,736,480	▲36%	548,124	▲36%	2,284,604	▲36%
2021	1,279,854	▲34%	402,255	▲97%	1,682,209	▲45%
2020	957,290	▼52%	203,869	▼41%	1,161,159	▼50%
2019	1,980,252	▲8%	345,611	▲8%	2,325,863	▲7%
2018	1,863,373	▼1%	320,474	▲22%	2,183,847	▲2%
2017	1,884,103	▲6%	263,217	▲30%	2,147,320	▲8%
2016	1,781,989	▲1%	202,536	▼6%	1,984,525	▲1%
2015	1,756,787	▲17%	215,361	▼4%	1,972,148	▲14%
2014	1,501,520	▲6%	224,326	▲3%	1,745,846	▲6%
2013	1,414,826	▲29%	218,186	▼6%	1,633,012	▲23%
2012	1,096,883	▲13%	232,943	▼9%	1,329,826	▲9%
2011	968,942	▲35%	254,818	▲16%	1,223,760	▲30%
2010	720,297	▲27%	219,948	▲4%	940,245	▲21%
2009	568,106	▲18%	210,533	▲8%	778,639	▲15%
2008	479,857	▼17%	194,976	▲3%	674,833	▼12%
2007	575,473	Steady	189,833	Steady	765,306	Steady

== Access ==
Public buses run from the airport (just outside the gates) to the city center and vice versa. Travelers can also hire a taxi or rent a car. A less expensive option is to pre-arrange your airport pick up either through a travel agency or your hotel.
