= Corendon Airlines Europe =

Maltese charter airline

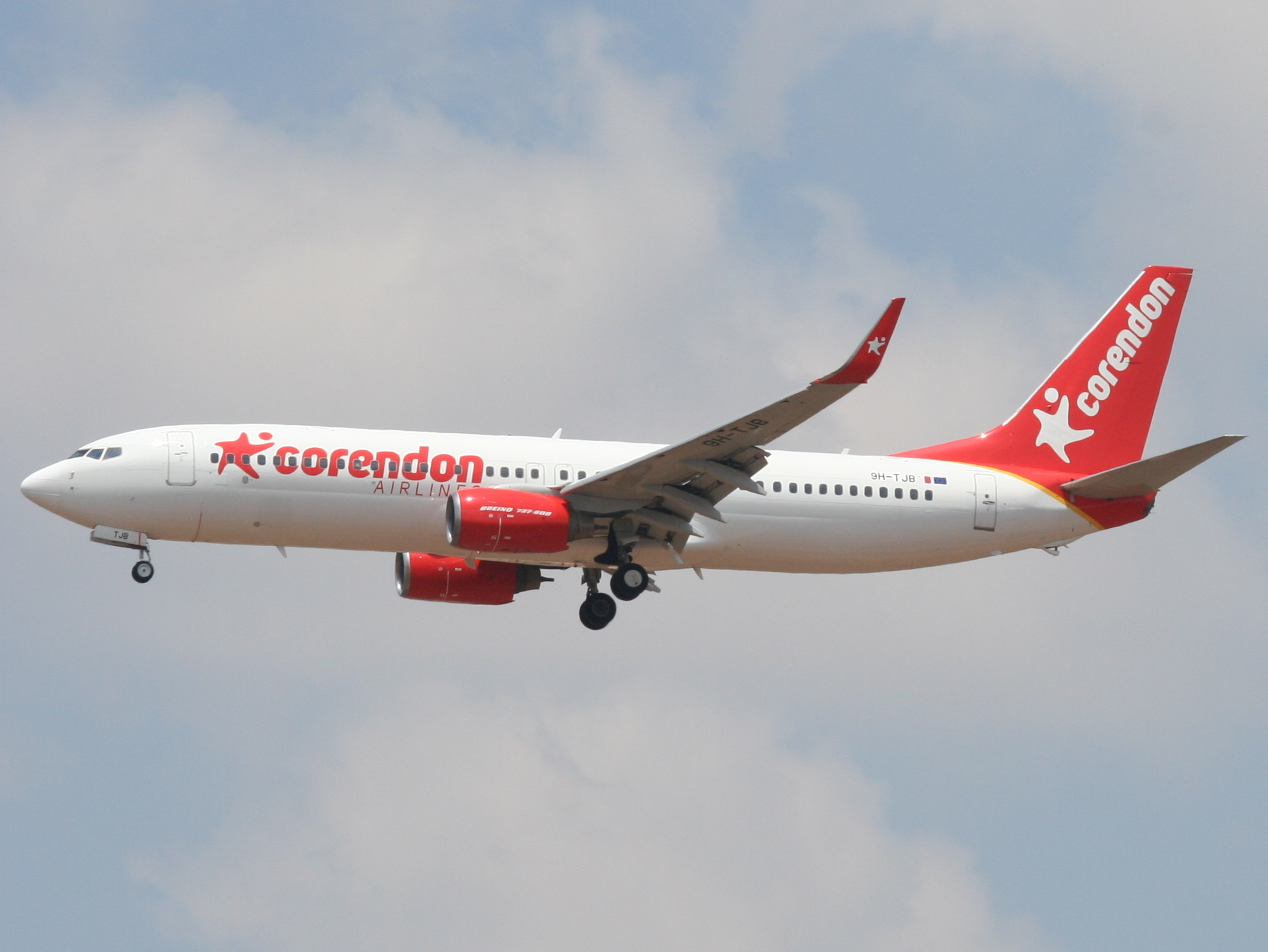
- Corendon Airlines Europe Boeing 737-800
IATA	ICAO	Call sign
XR	CXI	TOURISTIC
- Founded: 2017
- AOC #: MT-48
- Operating bases: Düsseldorf
- Fleet size: 13
- Parent company: Corendon Tourism Group
- Headquarters: Luqa, Malta
- Key people: Yildiray Karaer (CEO)
- Website: corendonairlines.com

Corendon Airlines Europe, legally incorporated as Touristic Aviation Services Ltd., is a European charter airline headquartered in Luqa and based at Malta International Airport. It carries a Maltese air operators certificate and is a sister company of Corendon Airlines and Corendon Dutch Airlines.

== History ==
Corendon Airlines Europe was established in February 2017 as a subsidiary of the Corendon Group in Birkirkara. On May 26, 2017, it conducted its inaugural flight from Malta to Naples. The sole owner of the company is AY Malta Holding Ltd., with its shareholders being E. Uslu Holding B.V. and Y. Karaer Holding B.V.. Erol (also known as Atılay) Uslu and Yildiray Karaer are the co-founders of the Corendon Group. In 2017, Corendon Airlines Europe appeared in publications related to the Paradise Papers. In June 2020, the company's headquarters were relocated to Luqa Airport.

In April 2023, it became publicly known that Corendon Airlines is facing financial difficulties. Among other issues, the airline owes the German state approximately 6 million euros because it had not paid air traffic taxes for an extended period.

== Fleet ==
=== Current fleet ===
As of July 2026, Corendon Airlines Europe operates the following aircraft:

Aircraft	In service	Passengers
Boeing 737-800	13	189
Total	13	189

=== Former fleet ===
As of August 2025, Corendon Airlines Europe operated 13 Boeing 737-800.

== Destinations ==
Corendon Airlines Europe based its aircraft at several airports in Germany, including Düsseldorf, Nuremberg, Cologne/Bonn, and Hanover, as well as one in Basel/Mulhouse in France.

Apart from the base airports, Corendon Airlines Europe serves mostly holiday destinations such as Turkey, Greek Islands, Canary and Balearic Islands (both in Spain), Egypt and Tel Aviv (Israel).

== Accidents and incidents ==
On October 1, 2021, several passengers on flight XR1050 from Cologne Bonn Airport to the island of Rhodes, reportedly collapsed and fell unconscious. Upon treatment by crew members and passengers with medical training, the affected passengers recovered and the flight continued to its destination.
