= Hamaxia (town) =

Town in the east of ancient Pamphylia

Coordinates: 36°34′43″N 31°56′22″E

Hamaxia (Ancient Greek: Ἁμαξία) was a town in the east of ancient Pamphylia or in the west of Cilicia. It had a good roadstead for ships, and excellent cedars for ship-building. Hamaxia is likely the same place as Anaxion or Anaxium or Amaxian (Ἁμαξίαν) mentioned by the Stadiasmus Maris Magni as being west of Coracesium. Strabo reports that the town was one of the gifts of Mark Antony to Cleopatra.

Its site is tentatively located near Sinekkalesi, in Turkey. There are archaeological remains, including walls and a gate.
