= Gazipaşa–Alanya Airport =

Gazipaşa–Alanya Airport Gazipaşa-Alanya Havalimanı

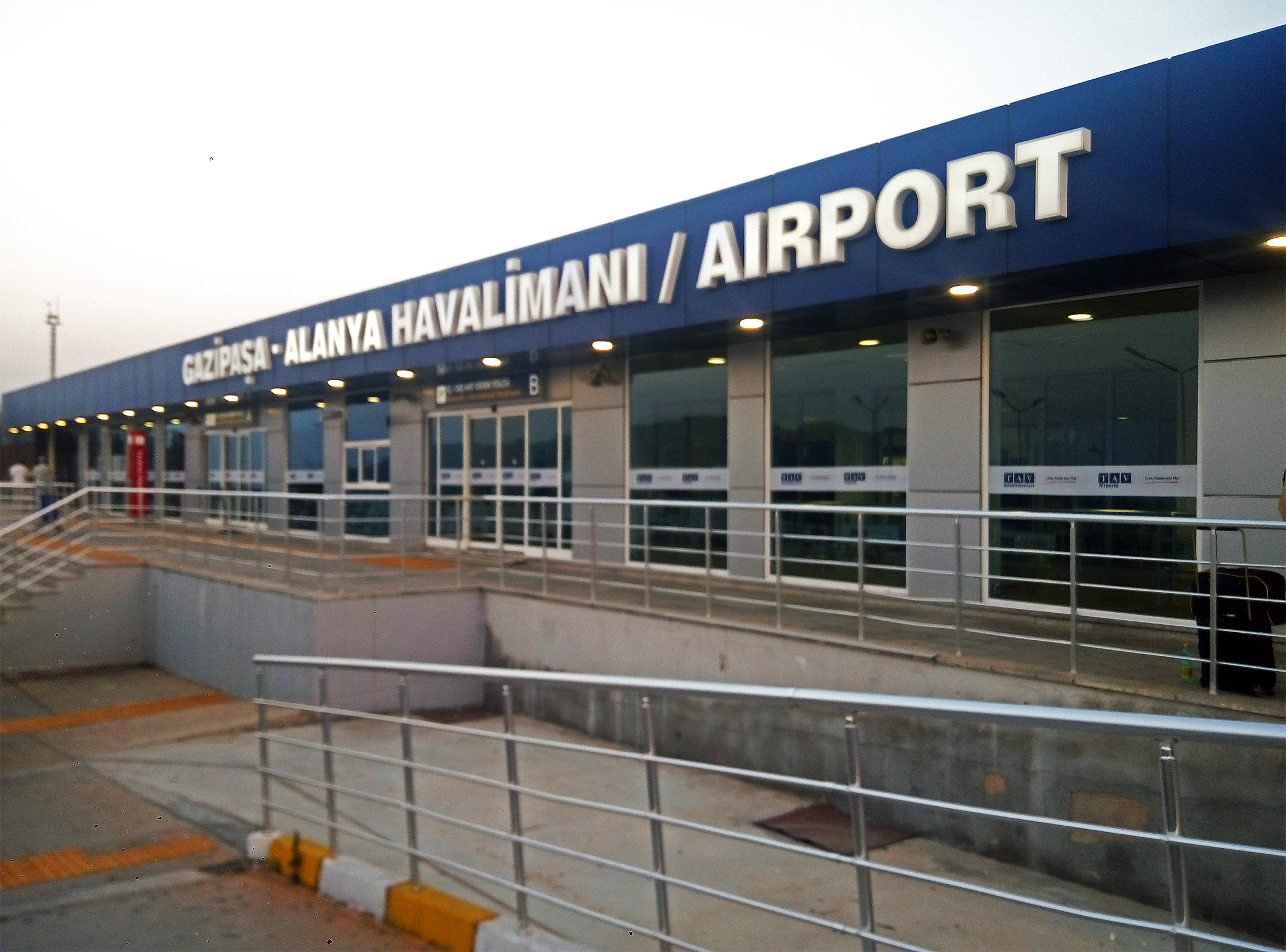
- IATA: GZP; ICAO: LTFG

Summary
- Airport type: Public
- Owner: General Directorate of State Airports (DHMİ)
- Operator: TAV Airports
- Serves: Alanya
- Location: Gazipaşa, Turkey
- Opened: 12 July 2010; 16 years ago
- Elevation AMSL: 92 ft (28 m)
- Coordinates: 36°17′56″N 32°18′00″E
- Website: gzpairport.com

Map
- Location of airport in Turkey GZP (Mediterranean) GZP (Europe)

Runways
Direction	Length		Surface
Direction	m	ft	Surface
08/26	2,350	7,710	Concrete / asphalt

Statistics (2025)
- Annual passenger capacity: 1,500,000
- Passengers: 992,383
- Passenger change 2024–25: ▼3%
- Aircraft movements: 7,477
- Movements change 2024–25: ▼4%

Gazipaşa Airport (IATA: GZP, ICAO: LTFG) is an airport which serves the Gazipaşa, Anamur, Alanya, Kargıcak, Kestel, Payallar, Avsallar, Okurcalar, Kızılağaç and Side areas of the Antalya Province in Turkey. The airport opened for domestic flights in July 2010 with daily flights from Istanbul with Borajet. International flights began in the 2011 holiday season, with flights from Amsterdam. The new airport is only 30 minutes by road from Alanya compared to a travel time of two hours between Alanya and Antalya Airport, which was previously the nearest airport, 120 km away.

== Construction ==
The airport was finished in 1999, but it was not opened for operation. Talks were held in 2006, with reports commissioned by the national government, local government, and tourist organizations to commence operation. Finally, the decision was made clear in 2007 after multiple bids had been submitted to award operation to Tepe Akfen Ventures Airports Holding (TAV), which paid $50,000 a year, and a 65% share in profit for the right to operate the airport for 25 years. TAV then updated and expanded the airport, including lengthening the runway to 2,350m in order to handle international operations, among other things.

== Facilities ==
The airport has an annual passenger capacity of 1,500,000 passengers, a terminal area of 6,700 square meters and a parking lot with a capacity of 105 vehicles.

== Airlines and destinations ==
The following airlines operate regular scheduled and charter flights at Gazipaşa Airport:

Airlines	Destinations
Air Serbia	Seasonal charter: Belgrade, Niš
AJet	Ankara
Avion Express	Seasonal charter: Vilnius
Corendon Airlines	Seasonal: Aalborg, Berlin, Bucharest-Otopeni, Cluj-Napoca, Cologne/Bonn, Leipzig/Halle
Corendon Dutch Airlines	Seasonal: Amsterdam, Groningen
Finnair	Helsinki
FlyArystan	Almaty; Seasonal: Astana
IrAero	Seasonal: Sochi
Norwegian Air Shuttle	Seasonal: Oslo
Pegasus Airlines	Istanbul–Sabiha Gökçen
Pobeda	Moscow-Vnukovo
Scandinavian Airlines	Seasonal: Copenhagen, Oslo, Stockholm–Arlanda
Sunclass Airlines	Seasonal charter: Helsinki, Oslo, Stockholm–Arlanda
TUI fly Netherlands	Seasonal: Amsterdam
Turkish Airlines	Istanbul

== Traffic statistics ==
Alanya–Gazipaşa Airport passenger traffic statistics
Year (months)	Domestic	% change	International	% change	Total	% change
2025	430,817	▼8%	561,566	▲0%	992,383	▼3%
2024	467,125	▼1%	560,529	▲55%	1,027,654	▲23%
2023	473,046	▲12%	362,663	▲39%	835,709	▲22%
2022	421,266	▲14%	261,388	▲24%	682,654	▲18%
2021	369,495	▲74%	210,140	▲259%	579,635	▲114%
2020	212,311	▼57%	58,557	▼90%	270,868	▼75%
2019	493,485	▼14%	591,416	▼6%	1,084,901	▼10%
2018	575,218	▲20%	626,677	▲83%	1,201,895	▲46%
2017	478,837	▲16%	342,341	▲11%	821,178	▲14%
2016	411,471	▲2%	307,247	▼40%	718,718	▼21%
2015	403,792	▲26%	510,225	▲26%	914,017	▲26%
2014	319,578	▲189%	405,264	▲78%	724,842	▲114%
2013	110,590	▲2.769%	227,932	▲200%	338,522	▲325%
2012	3,854	▼8%	75,886	▲664%	79,740	▲464%
2011	4,192	▼11%	9,938	-	14,130	▲202%
2010	4,684	Steady	-	Steady	4,684	Steady

^1: 2010 statistics correspond to the last 6 months of 2010 since the opening of the airport.

== Accidents and incidents ==
- On 9 May 2024, a Boeing 737-800 passenger aircraft belonging to Corendon Airlines saw one of its tires burst during landing, resulting emergency landing on one of the airport's runways after its front landing gear failed, resulting in the evacuation of all 190 passengers and crew on board and the temporary closure of the runway.
