= Philia (disambiguation) =

Philia is one of the four ancient Greek words for love.

Philia may also refer to:

- Philia (Greco-Roman magic), in Greco-Roman religion.
- "Philia" (song), a song by Versailles.
- Philia (Thrace), town of ancient Thrace.
- Philia culture, which existed on Cyprus in the middle and late Bronze Age.
- Philia (nymph), Greek mythology.
- 280 Philia, an asteroid named after the previous item.
- Philia, a character in the Sword Art Online videogame series.
- Philia, a character in A Funny Thing Happened on the Way to the Forum.
- Philia, a character in the movie All About Lily Chou-Chou.
- "Philia (Prelude)", a song by Flobots from Noenemies.
- Philia, a taxonomic synonym for a genus of bugs, Lampromicra.
