= Tayakadın, Arnavutköy =

Tayakadın
- Neighbourhood
- Location in Turkey Tayakadın (Istanbul)
- Coordinates: 41.2703°N 28.69006°E
- Country: Turkey
- Province: Istanbul
- District: Arnavutköy
- Population (2022): 2,951
- Time zone: UTC+3 (TRT)
- Postal code: 34277
- Area code: 0212

Tayakadın is a neighbourhood in the municipality and district of Arnavutköy, Istanbul Province, Turkey. Its population is 2,951 (2022). It was located in Çatalca until 1972, after which it was reassigned to Gaziosmanpaşa in 1972 before being transferred to Arnavutköy in 2008.

== Geography ==
Tayakadın is at the junction of Arnavutköy-Göktürk-Çatalca roads. It located is 12 km (7.5 mi) from Arnavutköy, 20 km (12 mi) from Göktürk and 12 km (7.5 mi) from Karaburun. It is very close to Istanbul Airport.
