= DHX =

DHX may refer to:

- ICAO designator for DHL International Aviation ME, a Bahraini cargo airline, subsidiary of DHL Express.
- DHX Media, a former name of the Canadian media production, distribution and broadcasting company WildBrain.
