= Bahrain Airport Company =

Coordinates: 26°16′15″N 050°38′01″E

- Native name: شركة مطار البحرين
- Type: Semi-governmental
- Founded: January 17, 2008; 18 years ago
- Headquarters: Muharraq, Bahrain
- Services: Airport management
- Owner: Gulf Air Group Holding Company
- Subsidiaries: Hala Bahrain
- Website: Official website

Bahrain Airport Company (BAC; Arabic: شركة مطار البحرين) is a semi-governmental company that is the operator and managing body of Bahrain International Airport, the country's only international civilian airport. Headquartered on Airport Avenue on the island of Muharraq, the company is fully owned by Mumtalakat, Bahrain's sovereign wealth fund, and falls under the Gulf Air Group Holding Company.

The current CEO of the company is Ahmed Mohamed Janahi, having succeeded Mohamed Yousif Al Binfalah in 2026.

== History ==
The Bahrain Airport Company was established on 17 January 2008. The company is responsible for developing BIA and enhancing its capacity and infrastructure to accommodate future growth. Under the company, the airport was awarded the Best Middle East Airport award at the Skytrax World Airport Awards in 2010. In the 2026 edition, the airport was also awarded the Cleanest Middle East Airport award by Skytrax.

In 2017, the Bahrain Airport Company launched Hala Bahrain, a wholly-owned subsidiary company dedicated to premium hospitality services at Bahrain International Airport. It is classified as part of the taxi and limousine industry.

In 2026, BAC announced the renewal of its baggage handling maintenance contract partnership with Vanderlande at Bahrain International Airport.

== See also ==
- Transport in Bahrain
