= Istanbul Airport =

Largest airport serving Istanbul, Turkey

Istanbul Airport İstanbul Havalimanı

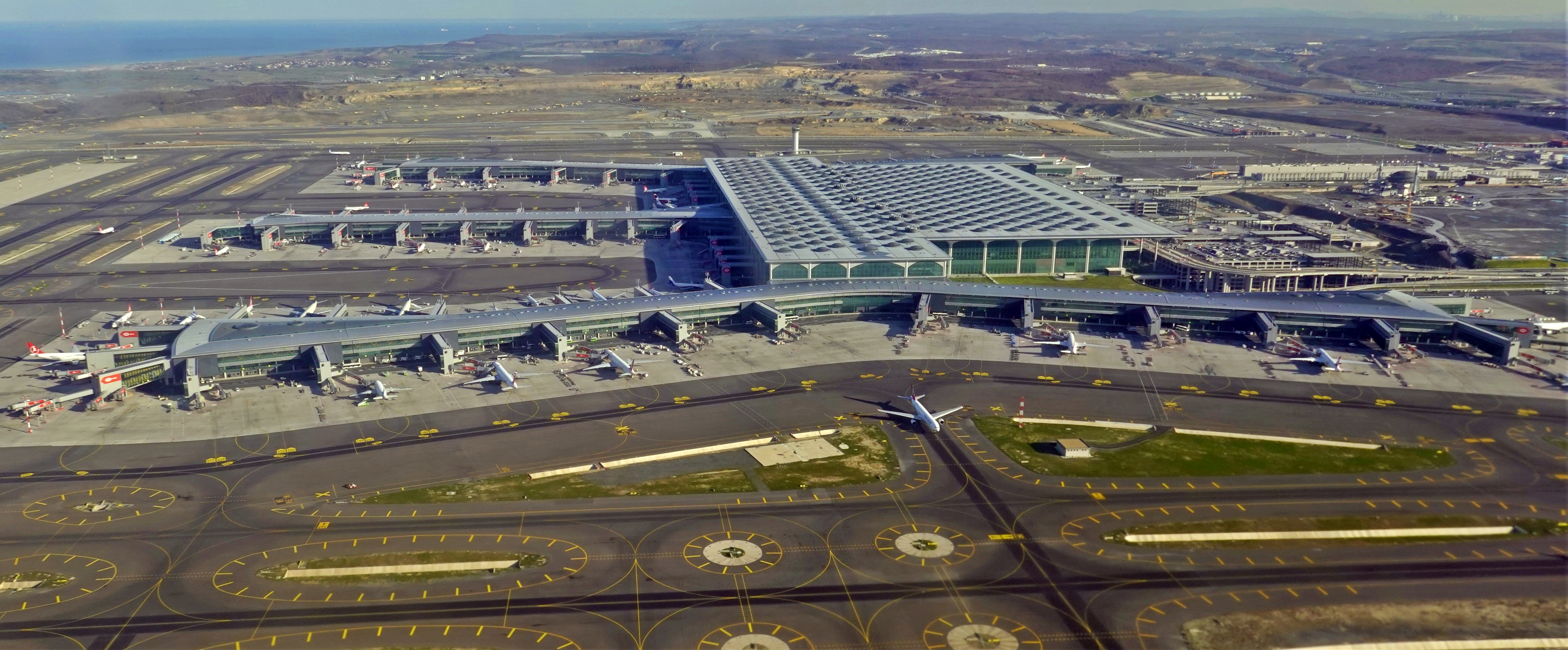
- IATA: IST; ICAO: LTFM

Summary
- Airport type: Public
- Owner: General Directorate of State Airports Authority
- Operator: IGA (Istanbul Grand Airport) Havalimanı İşletmesi A.Ş.
- Serves: Istanbul, Turkey
- Location: Arnavutköy, Istanbul, Turkey
- Opened: Ceremony: 29 October 2018; 8 years ago; All passenger services: 6 April 2019; 7 years ago; All cargo services: 5 February 2022; 4 years ago
- Hub for: Turkish Airlines; Turkish Cargo
- Focus city for: Istanbul
- Operating base for: Turkish Airlines
- Time zone: TRT (UTC+03:00)
- Elevation AMSL: 99 m (325 ft)
- Coordinates: 41°15′44″N 28°43′40″E
- Public transit access: Istanbul Metro: M11İstanbul Havalimanı station
- Website: www.istairport.com

Maps
- Location of airport in Turkey IST/LTFM (Turkey) IST/LTFM (Europe) IST/LTFM (Balkans) IST/LTFM (North Atlantic)
- Interactive map of Istanbul Airport

Runways
Direction	Length		Surface
Direction	m	ft	Surface
16L/34R	3,750	12,303	Asphalt
16R/34L	3,750	12,303	Asphalt
17L/35R	4,100	13,451	Asphalt
17R/35L	4,100	13,451	Asphalt
18/36	3,060	10,039	Asphalt/concrete
09/27	2,819	9,249	Concrete

Statistics (2025)
- Annual passenger capacity: 90,000,000
- Total passengers: 84,513,937
- Rank (world): 8th
- International passengers: 66,637,356
- Aircraft operations: 549,296
- Cargo tonnage: 2,086,241
- Source: (Turkish AIP at Eurocontrol) Turkish Airports Authority

Istanbul Airport (IATA: IST, ICAO: LTFM) is the larger of two international airports serving Istanbul, Turkey. It is located in the Arnavutköy district on the European side of the city. It is the largest airport in Turkey, the largest privately-owned airport operation in the world, and one of the busiest airports in Europe.

All scheduled commercial passenger flights were transferred from Atatürk Airport to Istanbul Airport on 6 April 2019, following the closure of Atatürk Airport for scheduled passenger flights. The IATA airport code IST was also transferred to the new airport.

It served more than 84 million passengers in 2025, making it the second-busiest airport in Europe in 2025, after Heathrow Airport. It was also the eighth-busiest airport in the world of 2025 in terms of total passenger traffic and, by serving more than 66 million international passengers, the sixth-busiest airport in the world in terms of international passenger traffic according to ACI World traffic values. It has regular flights to up to 122 countries and is the hub for Turkish Airlines.

== History ==
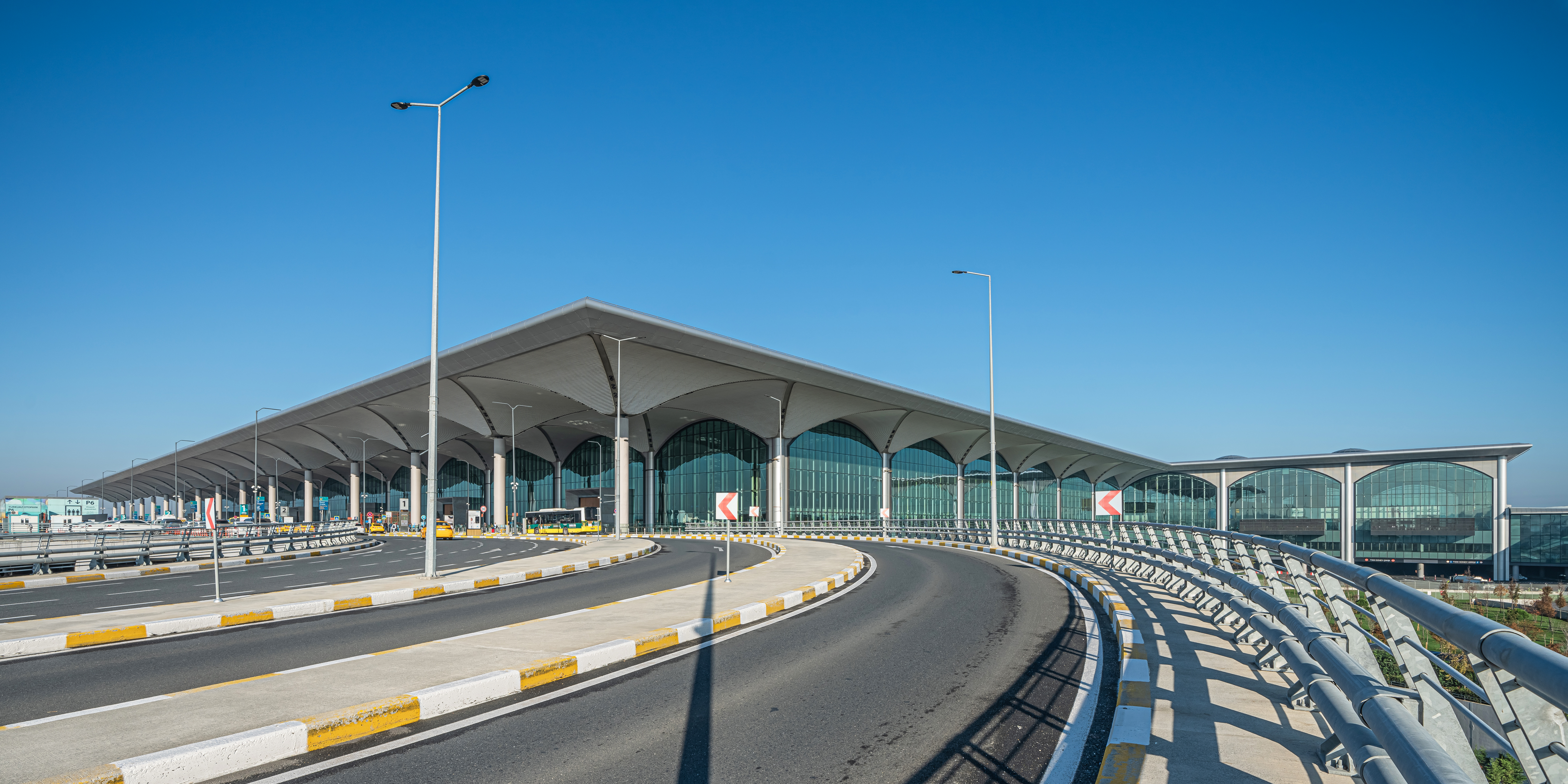
Terminal building exterior

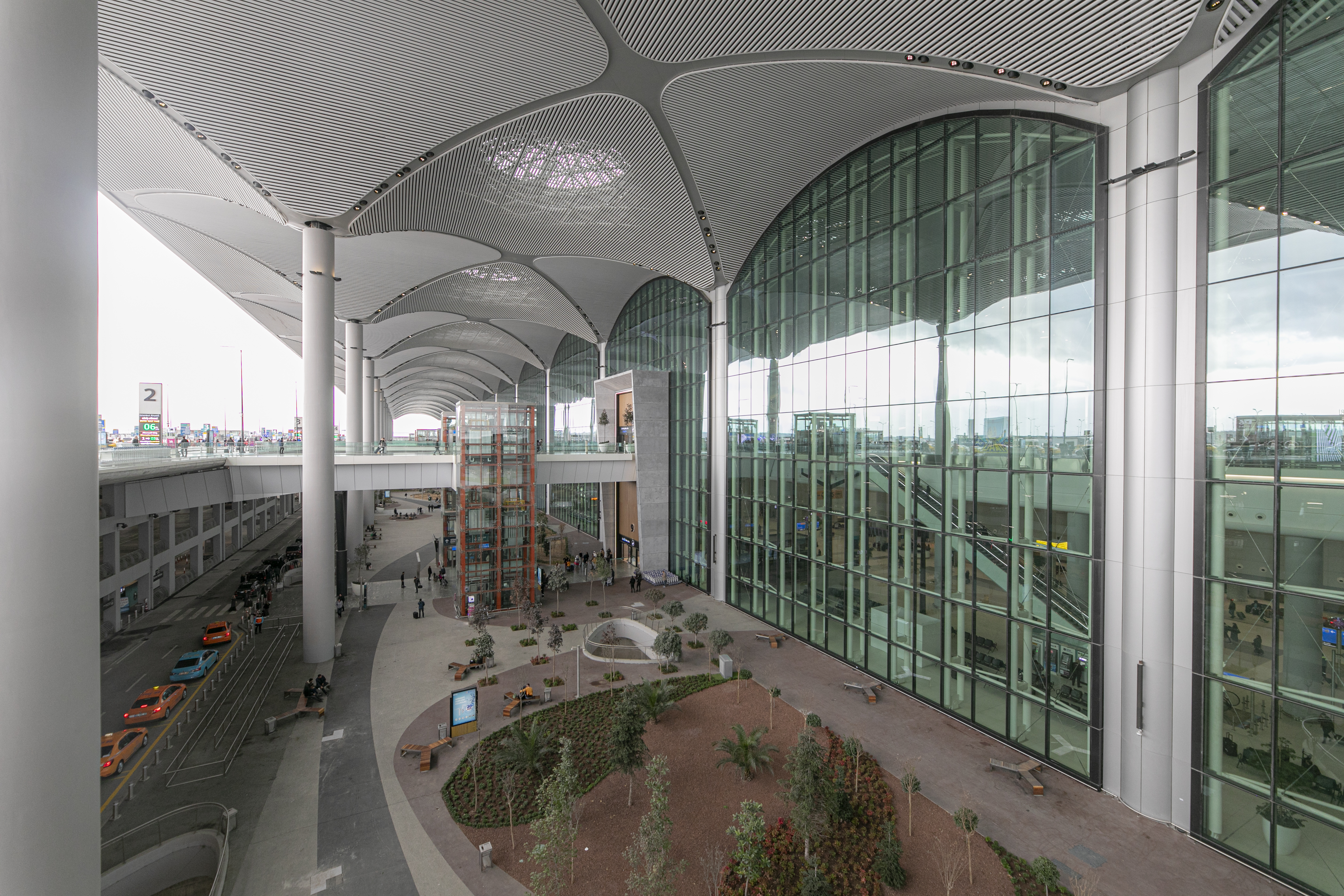
Entrance area

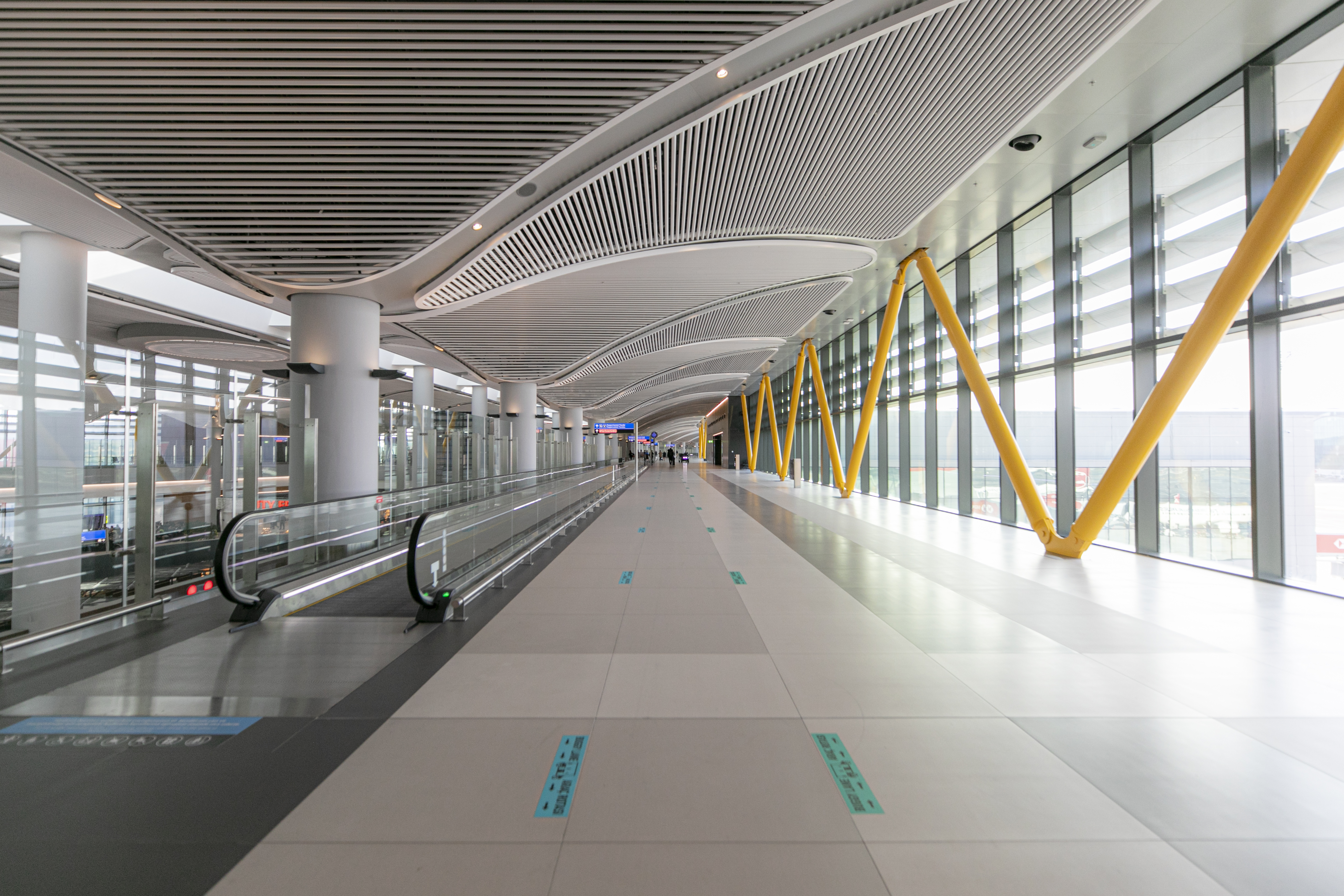
Terminal building interior

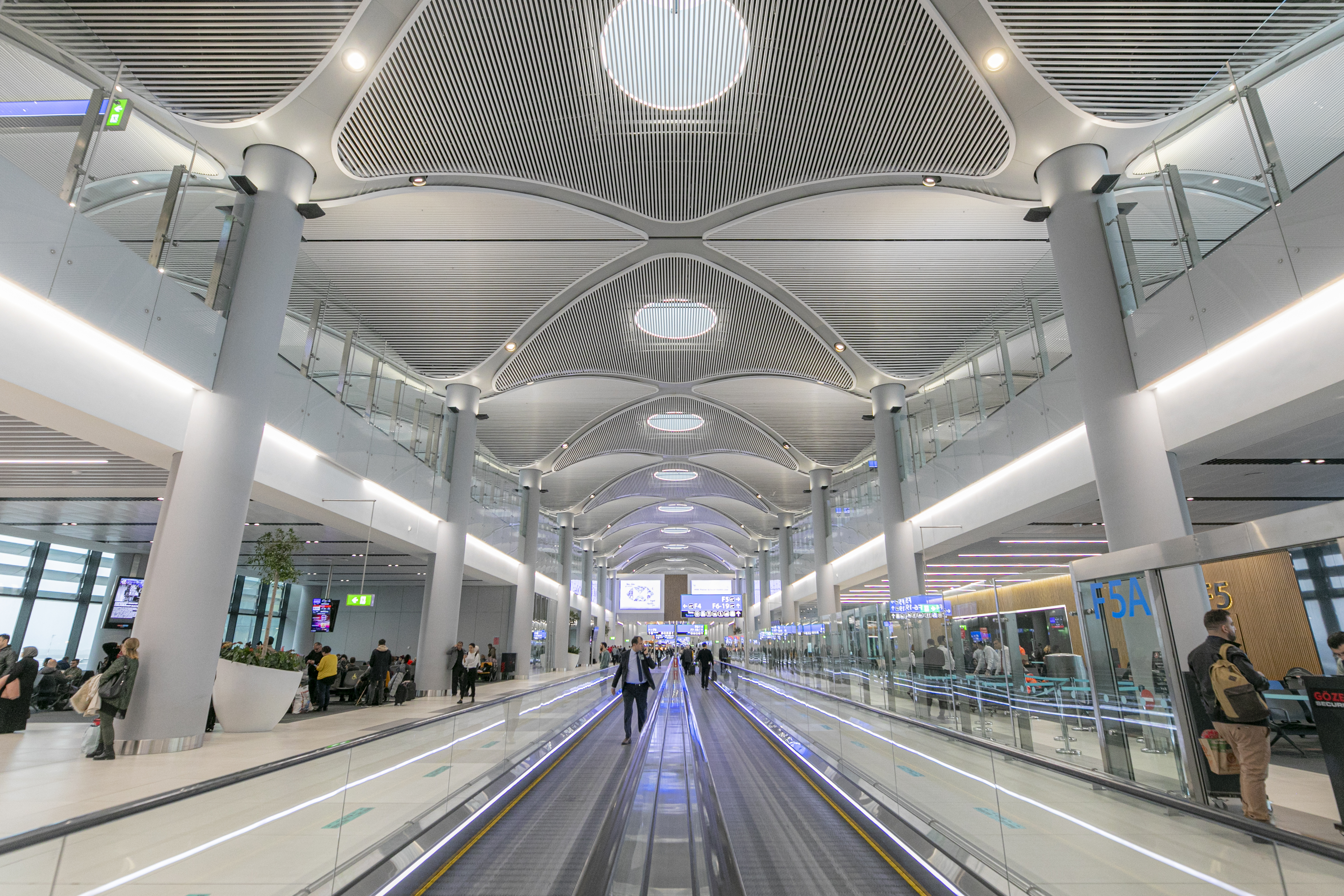
Airside area interior

=== Background ===
Atatürk Airport was one of the busiest airports in Europe. Since 2013, it had ranked among the five busiest airports in Europe by passenger traffic. In 2017, Atatürk Airport and Sabiha Gökçen, Istanbul's other international airport, handled more than 100 million passengers combined. By comparison, in 2025, the six London-area airports serve more than 175 million passengers a year, while the three Paris-area airports serve more than 110 million passengers a year.

As Atatürk Airport was hemmed in by the city on three sides and the sea of Marmara on another, it was unable to expand to meet the growing demands placed on it. Sabiha Gökçen was also at capacity. The decision was taken to build a new airport, well away from the city to ensure ample space.

=== Location ===
It was decided to construct the new airport at the intersection of roads to Arnavutköy, Göktürk, and Çatalca, north of central Istanbul and between the Black Sea coast towns of Yeniköy, Tayakadın and Akpınar. The area is a 7,600-hectare (19,000-acre) region near Lake Terkos. Some 6,172 hectares (15,250 acres) of this area was state-owned forest. The distance between Istanbul Airport and Atatürk Airport is approximately 35 km (22 mi). The area encompassed old open-pit coal mines, which were later filled with soil.

According to the Environmental Impact Assessment (ÇED) report published in April 2013, there were a total of 2,513,341 trees in the area and 657,950 of them would need to be cut indispensably, while 1,855,391 trees would be moved to new places. However, the Ministry of Forest and Water Management claimed the exact number of trees cut and moved would only be revealed after construction was complete.

=== Construction ===
Construction of the airport was divided over four phases. When all stages are completed, the airport will have the capacity to serve 200 million yearly passengers, which would at that time have made it the world's largest airport in terms of capacity. The cost of the project was estimated at €22 billion, making it the second most expensive airport ever built.

The project was achieved by an international design team working across different phases, but all focused on the collective vision. The architects behind the concept design were Grimshaw Architects, Nordic Office of Architecture and Haptic Architects. The lead delivery architect was Scott Brownrigg, also in charge of the interior concept design with IGA Design. Local delivery architects were Fonksiyon Mimarlik, Turgut Alton Mimarlik and Kiklop Design & Engineering.

A tender was made for the construction as well as for operating the airport. Bidding for these tenders took place on 3 May 2013. Of the eligible companies, four Turkish and two foreign contenders took part in the bidding process. The Turkish joint venture consortium of Cengiz-Kolin-Limak-Mapa-Kalyon won the tender and were obliged to pay the government €26.142 billion including value-added tax for a 25-year lease starting from 2018. The completion date of the construction's first stage was officially set for 2018 – 42 months after the finalization of the tender's approval.

The groundbreaking ceremony took place on 7 June 2014, though construction only started in May 2015 after the land was officially handed over.

The inauguration of the airport took place on the planned date of 29 October 2018. It was reported that the first test landing at the airport would take place on 26 February 2018; however, the first landing took place on 20 June 2018. Testing of navigational and electronic systems with DHMİ aircraft had begun on 15 May 2018.

The control tower is in the shape of the Turkish national flower, the tulip.

=== Project stages ===
The construction of the airport is taking place in several stages, expanding the airport and its facilities over time.

The first stage consists of the main terminal, with an annual passenger capacity of 90 million and an area of 1,440,000 m^{2} (15,500,000 sq ft) — making it the world's third-largest airport terminal building. There will also be two pairs of parallel runways connected to eight parallel taxiways to the west of the main terminal, approximately 4,000,000 m^{2} (43,000,000 sq ft) of apron space, and an indoor car-park with a capacity of 12,000 vehicles. In addition, the airport will feature three technical blocks for repairs, maintenance, and fueling, as well as an air traffic control tower, eight ramp control towers, and hangars for cargo and general aviation aircraft. Several other services are also to be in operation, including hospitals, frequent-flyer and VIP lounges, prayer rooms, convention centers, and hotels; some of these are expected to form part of the Istanbul Airport City project.

The second stage will add a third independent runway to the east of the main terminal, as well as a fourth remote runway with an east–west heading and additional taxiways and apron areas. The third stage is planned to add a second passenger terminal with a capacity of 60 million annual passengers and an estimated area of around 960,000 m^{2} (10,300,000 sq ft), as well as an additional runway and new support facilities area. The fourth and final stage of expansion will, along with adding another runway, allow for the construction of satellite terminals with a combined capacity of 50 million passengers and an area of up to 800,000 m^{2} (8,600,000 sq ft) if needed.

Once fully completed by 2027, the airport will have six sets of runways (eight in total), 16 taxiways, and a total annual passenger capacity of 150 million passengers. If fully expanded to a capacity of 200 million, the airport will exhibit four terminal buildings with interconnecting rail access that combine for a total indoor area of 3,200,000 m^{2} (34,000,000 sq ft). The airport will also have a 6,500,000 m^{2} (70,000,000 sq ft) apron with a parking capacity of 500 aircraft, VIP lounges, cargo and general aviation facilities, a state palace, and indoor and outdoor parking that can accommodate up to 70,000 cars. A medical center, aircraft rescue and firefighting stations, hotels, convention centers, power plants, and wastewater treatment facilities will also be built.

=== Controversies ===
The Turkish Chamber of Environmental Engineers (ÇMO) took the project tender to court on the grounds that the project violated the existing legislation for the preparation of the Environmental impact assessment (ÇED) report. In February 2014, an Istanbul administrative court ordered the construction of the airport to be suspended. However, the groundbreaking ceremony still took place a few months later, on 7 June 2014.

A report published in the Turkish newspaper Cumhuriyet in February 2018 claimed that more than 400 workers had been killed during the construction of the airport, with accidents killing three to four workers every week, and families of the killed workers being paid to remain silent about the incidents. Turkish daily Evrensel also alleged that fatal accidents continued to occur. This prompted opposition MP Veli Ağbaba to submit a written questionnaire to the Turkish parliament on 13 February 2018. In response, the Turkish Ministry of Labour and Social Security claimed that there were only 27 fatalities during the construction of the airport. In October 2019, UK publications Construction News and Architects' Journal published a joint investigation into fatalities at the airport, nicknamed by workers "the cemetery" as so many have died. By this point, the official death toll had risen to 55, but unofficial estimates suggested that the figure could be "higher than 400".

Mass worker protests broke out on 14 September 2018 after a bus carrying workers crashed, injuring 17. Complaints by workers included poor living conditions in "vermin-infested dormitories", issues in transportation that had left them stranded under the rain or on-site during holidays, and long delays in payments, among others.

=== Operations ===
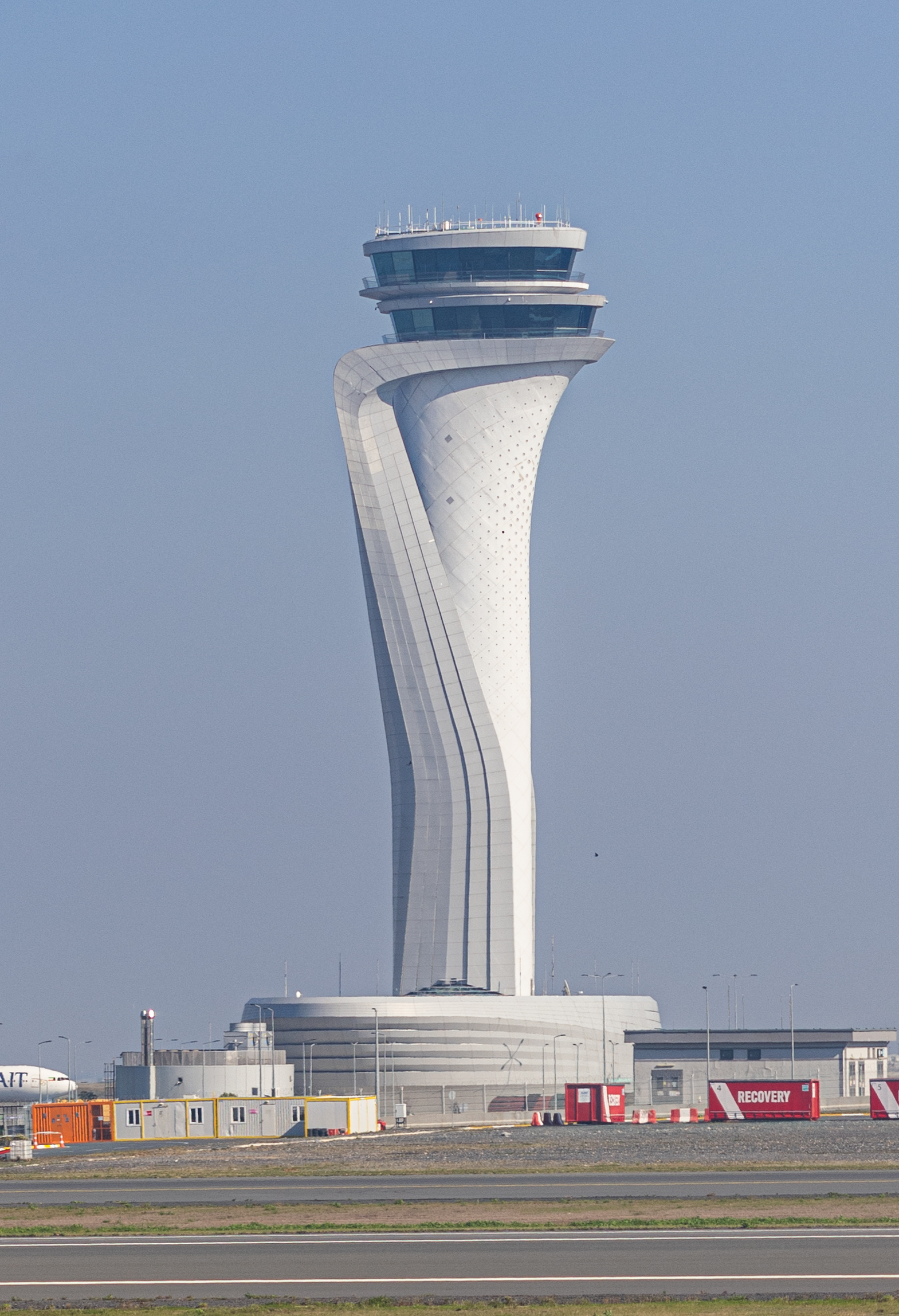
ATC tower at the Istanbul Airport

The opening ceremony took place on 29 October 2018, scheduled so as to coincide with the 95th anniversary of the proclamation of the Turkish Republic. The airport had been unofficially known as 'Istanbul New Airport' during construction – the new official name of 'Istanbul Airport' was announced at the opening ceremony. The first flight from the airport was Turkish Airlines flight TK2124 to the Turkish capital Ankara on 31 October 2018. On 1 November 2018, five daily flights began to arrive and depart from the airport: from Ankara, Antalya, Baku, North Nicosia, and İzmir, followed by Adana and Trabzon starting in December.

Before the full transfer, all flights were operated exclusively by Turkish Airlines. Regularly scheduled flights to all of the new airport's destinations continued to depart from Atatürk and Sabiha Gökçen airports alongside these trial flights. It was originally planned that on 31 December 2018, all equipment from Atatürk Airport would be transferred to the new airport via the O-7 motorway. As of 17 January 2019, the transfer phase was set to start 1 March 2019. However, on 25 February, the transfer phase was moved a fourth time to 5 April 2019.

The full transfer of all scheduled commercial passenger flights from Atatürk Airport to the new Istanbul Airport took place on 6 April 2019 between 02:00 and 14:00. Hundreds of trucks carried more than 10,000 pieces of equipment, each weighing about 44 tons were moved to the new airport over 41 hours. Atatürk Airport's IATA code IST was swapped with Istanbul Airport's previous code of ISL.

In February 2022, Turkish Cargo relocated all cargo flights and operations from their former base at Atatürk Airport to the new airport.

== Facilities ==
=== Runways ===
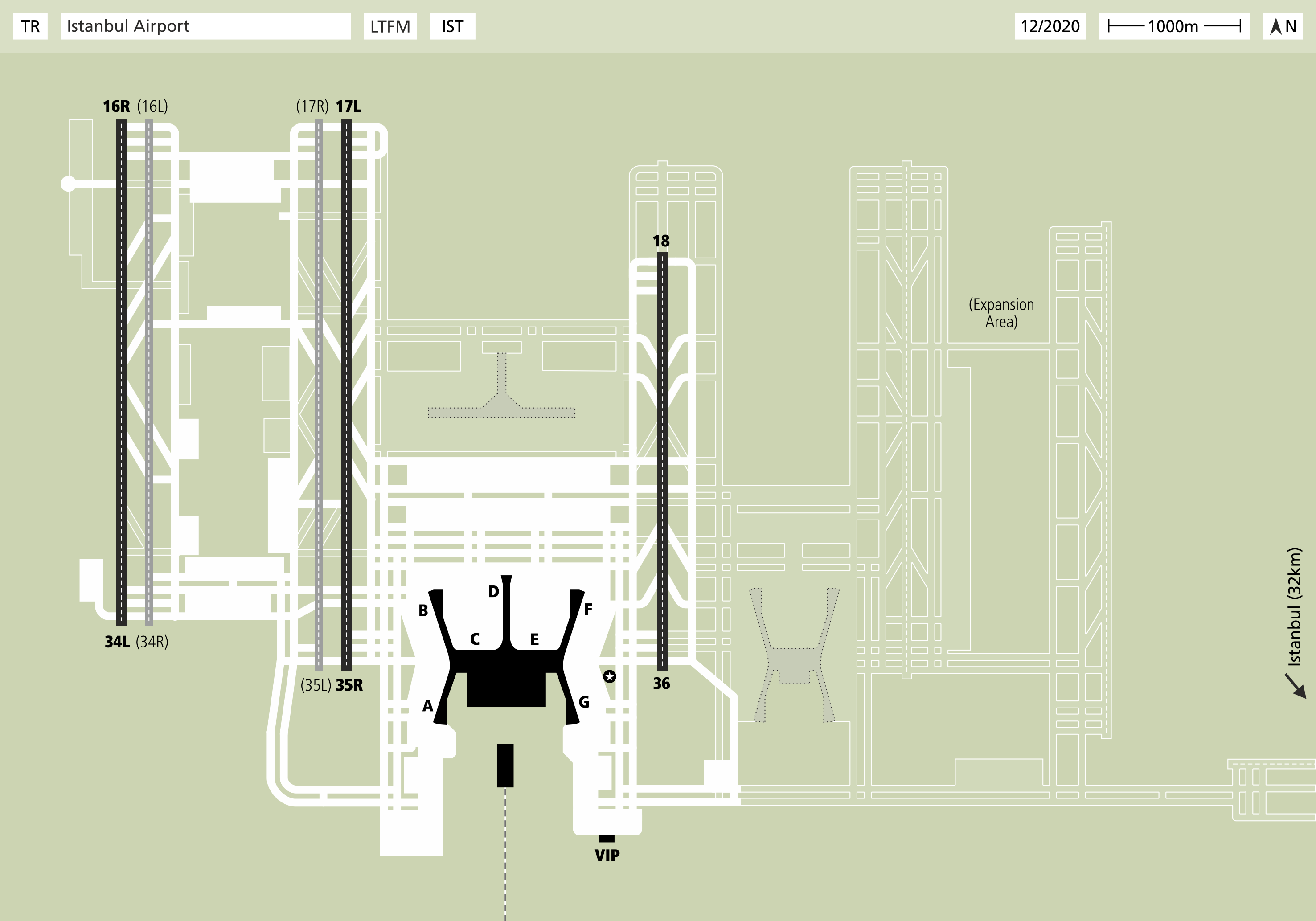
Airport layout (as of December 2020)

The airport currently has one terminal in service for domestic and international flights and five runways (three main and two backups) that are currently in operation. The two 17/35 runways are both 4,100 metres (13,500 feet) long, while the 16/34 runways are both 3,750 metres (12,300 feet) long. Runway 18/36 is 3,060 metres (10,040 feet) long, shorter than the other runways, although it is projected to expand to 3,750 metres (12,300 feet), the same length as the 16/34 pair. Runways 17L/35R and 16R/34L are 60 metres (200 feet) wide, while 17R/35L, 16L/34R and 18/36 are 45 metres (148 feet) wide. All runway surfaces are asphalt.

=== Concourses ===
The airport features a total of five concourses, lettered A, B, D, F, and G, with a total of 143 passenger boarding bridges. Concourse G, which is located in the southeast, is reserved solely for domestic flights. Concourses A, B, D, and F are used for international flights. The C and E concourses connect directly to the main terminal and are therefore not independent concourses.

=== Security ===
3,500 security personnel and a total of 1,850 police, including 750 immigration officers, provide the airport's security. The site's perimeter is protected using ground radar, fixed CCTV cameras every 60 meters, pan–tilt–zoom cameras every 360 meters (1,180 feet), thermal cameras and fiber optic sensors every 720 meters (2,360 feet). The active terminal building uses up to 9,000 CCTV cameras.

=== Mosque ===
Ali Kuşçu Mosque, which lies within Airport City to the south of the airport and can accommodate up to 6,000 worshippers, has become the world's first "LEED Gold" certified mosque registered with the U.S. Green Building Council.

== Airlines and destinations ==
=== Passenger ===
The following airlines operate regular scheduled and charter flights at Istanbul Airport:

Airlines	Destinations
Aegean Airlines	Athens, Heraklion, Thessaloniki; Seasonal: Mykonos, Rhodes, Santorini
Aeroflot	Krasnodar, Mineralnye Vody, Moscow–Sheremetyevo, Saint Petersburg, Sochi, Yekaterinburg
Afriqiyah Airways	Misrata
Air Algérie	Algiers, Annaba, Constantine, Oran
Air Arabia	Rabat, Sharjah
Air Astana	Almaty, Astana, Atyrau
Air Cairo	Cairo, Hurghada (resumes 26 December 2026), Sharm El Sheikh
Air China	Beijing–Capital
Air Europa	Madrid
Air France	Paris–Charles de Gaulle
Air Montenegro	Podgorica, Tivat
Air Samarkand	Samarqand
Air Serbia	Belgrade, Kraljevo, Niš
Air Seychelles	Seychelles
Air Transat	Montréal–Trudeau, Toronto–Pearson
AirBaltic	Riga
All Nippon Airways	Tokyo–Haneda
Animawings	Bucharest–Otopeni, Cluj-Napoca, Craiova, Iași, Timișoara
Ariana Afghan Airlines	Kabul
Asiana Airlines	Seoul–Incheon
Azerbaijan Airlines	Baku
azimuth	Krasnodar, Mineralnye Vody, Sochi
Badr Airlines	Port Sudan
Basra Airlines	Baghdad
Belavia	Minsk
Berniq Airways	Benghazi
British Airways	London–Heathrow
Centrum Air	Namangan, Fergana, Samarqand, Tashkent
China Eastern Airlines	Shanghai–Pudong, Xi'an
China Southern Airlines	Beijing–Daxing, Guangzhou, Ürümqi
Croatia Airlines	Split
Crown Airlines	Tripoli–Mitiga
Egyptair	Cairo
Emirates	Dubai–International
Ethiopian Airlines	Addis Ababa
Etihad Airways	Abu Dhabi
Fly Baghdad	Baghdad
Fly Oya	Tripoli–Mitiga
Flyadeal	Jeddah, Medina, Riyadh
FlyArystan	Aqtau, Qarağandy
Flydubai	Dubai–International
FlyErbil	Erbil
Flykhiva	Termez
Flynas	Abha, Gassim, Riyadh
FlyOne	Chișinău,
Ghadames Air Transport	Tripoli–Mitiga
Gulf Air	Bahrain
HiSky	Chișinău
Icelandair	Seasonal: Reykjavík–Keflavík
IndiGo	Delhi–Indira Gandhi, Mumbai–Shivaji
Iraqi Airways	Baghdad, Kirkuk, Sulaymaniyah
Jazeera Airways	Kuwait City
Kam Air	Kabul, Mazar-i-Sharif
Karun Airlines	Ahvaz
KLM	Amsterdam
KM Malta Airlines	Malta
Korean Air	Seoul–Incheon
Kuwait Airways	Kuwait City
Libyan Airlines	Tripoli–Mitiga
Libyan Wings	Tripoli–Mitiga
LOT Polish Airlines	Gdańsk, Kraków, Warsaw–Chopin
Lufthansa	Frankfurt
MIAT Mongolian Airlines	Ulaanbaatar
Middle East Airlines	Beirut
Nordwind Airlines	Kazan
Norwegian Air Shuttle	Seasonal: Oslo
Nouvelair	Tunis
Oman Air	Muscat
Pegasus Airlines	Ercan, İzmir
Pobeda	Moscow–Vnukovo, Ufa
Polaris Aviation	Chișinău
Qanot Sharq	Namangan, Qarshi, Tashkent
Qatar Airways	Doha
Red Wings Airlines	Chelyabinsk, Kaluga, Makhachkala, Moscow–Zhukovsky, Nalchik, Nizhnekamsk, Nizhny Novgorod, Samara, Sochi, Stavropol, Tyumen, Vladikavkaz
Rossiya Airlines	Moscow–Sheremetyevo, Saint Petersburg
Royal Air Maroc	Casablanca, Tangier
Royal Jordanian	Amman–Queen Alia; Seasonal: Amman–City
S7 Airlines	Moscow–Domodedovo, Novosibirsk
SalamAir	Muscat
Saudia	Jeddah, Medina, Riyadh
SCAT Airlines	Almaty, Aqtöbe, Atyrau, Şymkent
Sichuan Airlines	Athens, Chengdu–Tianfu
Singapore Airlines	Singapore
Sky Express	Athens
Somon Air	Dushanbe, Khujand
Southwind Airlines	Seasonal charter: Moscow–Sheremetyevo, Moscow–Zhukovsky
Syrian Air	Damascus
TAROM	Bucharest–Otopeni
Thai Airways International	Bangkok–Suvarnabhumi
Transavia	Bordeaux, Lyon, Montpellier, Nantes, Paris–Orly, Strasbourg
Tunisair	Tunis
Turkish Airlines	Abidjan, Abu Dhabi, Abuja, Accra, Adana/Mersin, Addis Ababa, Adıyaman, Ağrı, Aleppo, Alexandria, Algiers, Almaty, Amman–Queen Alia, Amsterdam, Ankara, Antalya, Antananarivo, Aqaba, Aqtau, Ashgabat, Asmara, Astana, Athens, Atlanta, Baghdad, Bahrain, Baku, Bamako, Bangkok–Suvarnabhumi, Banjul, Barcelona, Bari, Basel/Mulhouse, Basra, Batman, Batumi, Beijing–Capital, Beirut, Belgrade, Benghazi, Berlin, Bilbao, Billund, Bingöl, Birmingham, Bishkek, Bissau, Bodrum, Bogotá, Bologna, Bordeaux, Boston, Bremen, Brussels, Bucharest–Otopeni, Budapest, Buenos Aires–Ezeiza, Bukhara, Cairo, Çanakkale, Cancún, Cape Town, Caracas, Casablanca, Catania, Chengdu–Tianfu, Chicago–O'Hare, Chișinău, Cluj-Napoca, Cologne/Bonn, Colombo–Bandaranaike, Conakry, Constanța, Constantine, Copenhagen, Cotonou, Dakar–Diass, Dalaman, Dallas/Fort Worth, Damascus, Dammam, Dar es Salaam, Delhi–Indira Gandhi, Denizli, Denpasar, Denver, Detroit, Dhaka, Diyarbakır, Djibouti, Doha, Douala, Dubai–International, Dublin, Durban, Dushanbe, Düsseldorf, Edinburgh, Edremit, Elazığ, Entebbe, Erbil, Erzincan, Erzurum, Fergana, Frankfurt, Freetown, Ganja, Gaziantep, Gazipaşa/Alanya, Geneva, Gothenburg, Guangzhou, Hakkari, Hamburg, Hannover, Hanoi, Hatay, Havana, Helsinki, Ho Chi Minh City, Hong Kong, Houston–Intercontinental, Hurghada, Iğdır, Islamabad, Isparta, İzmir, Jakarta–Soekarno-Hatta, Jeddah, Johannesburg–O. R. Tambo, Juba, Kabul, Kahramanmaraş, Karachi, Kars, Kastamonu, Kathmandu, Kayseri, Kigali, Kilimanjaro, Kinshasa–N'djili, Kirkuk, Konya, Kraków, Kuala Lumpur–International, Kuwait City, Kütahya, Lagos, Lahore, Leipzig/Halle, Libreville, Lisbon, Ljubljana, London–Gatwick, London–Heathrow, London–Stansted, Los Angeles, Luanda–Agostinho Neto, Lusaka, Luxembourg, Lyon, Madrid, Málaga, Malatya, Malé, Malta, Manchester, Manila, Maputo, Mardin, Marrakech, Marseille, Mauritius, Medina, Melbourne, Merzifon, Mexico City–Benito Juárez, Miami, Milan–Malpensa, Minsk, Misrata, Mogadishu, Mombasa, Monrovia, Montréal–Trudeau, Moscow–Vnukovo, Mumbai–Shivaji, Munich, Muş, Muscat, Nairobi–Jomo Kenyatta, Najaf, Nakhchivan, Naples, N'Djamena, Nevşehir, New York–JFK, Newark, Niamey, Nice, Nicosia–Ercan, Nouakchott, Nuremberg, Oran, Ordu/Giresun, Osaka–Kansai, Oslo, Ouagadougou, Palermo, Panama City–Tocumen, Paris–Charles de Gaulle, Phnom Penh, Phuket, Podgorica, Pointe-Noire, Porto, Port Sudan, Prague, Pristina, Riga, Riyadh, Rize/Artvin, Rome–Fiumicino, Saint Petersburg, Salzburg, Samarqand, Samsun, San Francisco, Şanlıurfa, Santiago de Chile, São Paulo–Guarulhos, Sarajevo, Seattle/Tacoma, Seoul–Incheon, Seville, Shanghai–Pudong, Sharjah, Sharm El Sheikh, Singapore, Sinop, Şırnak, Sivas, Skopje, Sofia, Stockholm–Arlanda, Strasbourg, Stuttgart, Sulaimaniyah, Sydney–Kingsford Smith, Ta'if, Taipei–Taoyuan, Tallinn, Tashkent, Tbilisi, Thessaloniki, Timișoara, Tirana, Tokat, Tokyo–Haneda, Tokyo–Narita, Toronto–Pearson, Toulouse, Trabzon, Tripoli–Mitiga, Tunis, Turin, Türkıstan, Ulaanbaatar, Urgench, Valencia, Van, Vancouver, Varna, Venice, Vienna, Vilnius, Warsaw–Chopin, Washington–Dulles, Yanbu, Yaoundé, Yerevan, Zagreb, Zanzibar, Zonguldak, Zürich; Seasonal: Dubrovnik, Mahé, Moroni, Ohrid, Rovaniemi, Tivat
Turkmenistan Airlines	Ashgabat
Ural Airlines	Moscow–Domodedovo, Yekaterinburg
Utair	Grozny, Tyumen; Seasonal: Ufa
Uzbekistan Airways	Andizhan
Vueling	Barcelona
Wizz Air	Budapest, Debrecen, Iași, London–Luton

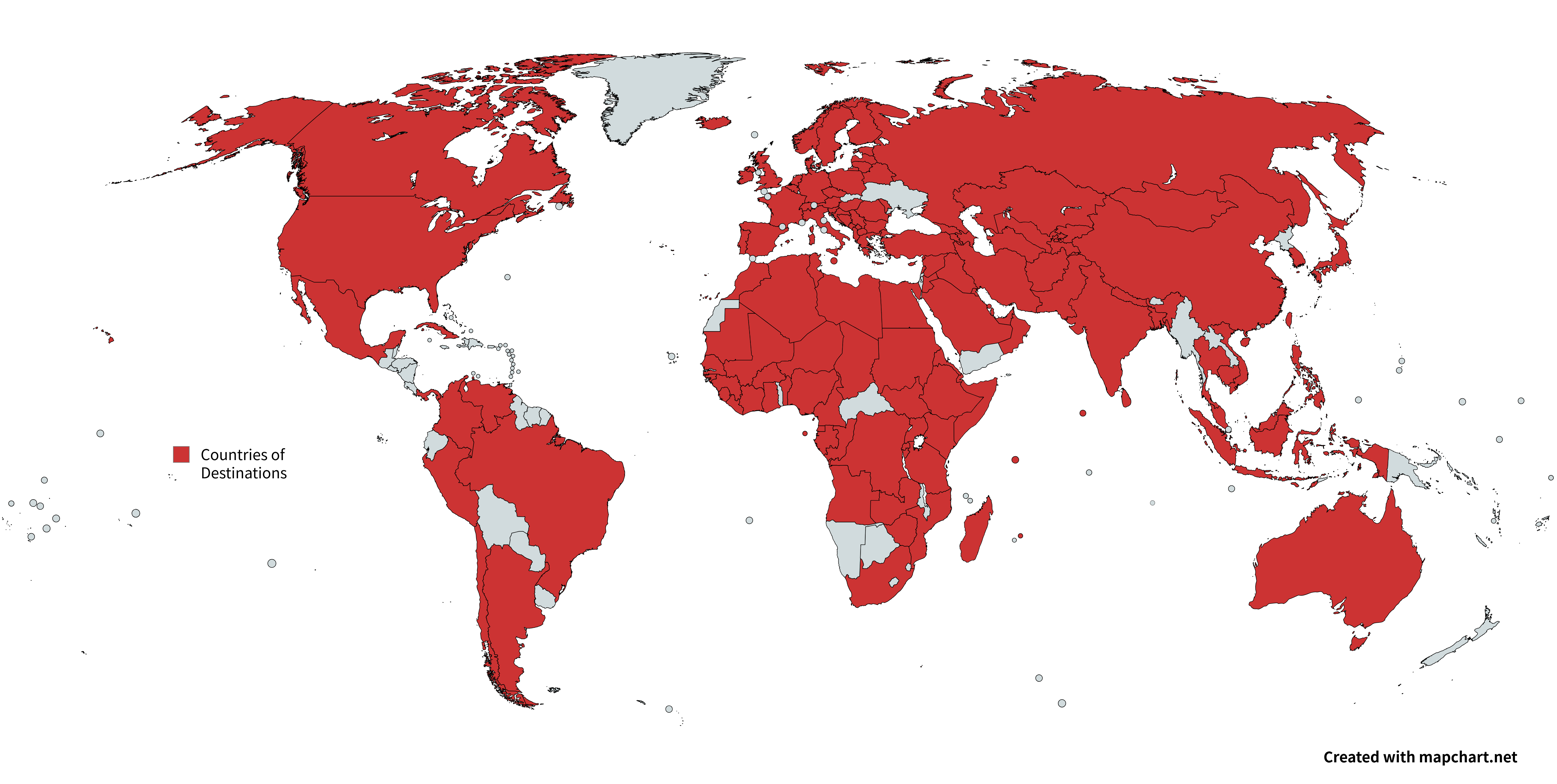
Destinations from Istanbul Airport as of February 2026.

== Statistics ==
Below is the passenger data and development for Istanbul Airport for the years 2018–2026:

Passenger statistics at Istanbul Airport
Year	Domestic passengers	Passenger % change	International passengers	Passenger % change	Total passengers	Passenger % change
2026 (October)	15,003,545	▼1%	56,966,023	▲2%	71,969,568	▲2%
2025	17,876,581	▲3%	66,637,356	▲6%	84,513,937	▲5%
2024	17,393,810	▼2%	63,036,930	▲8%	80,430,740	▲6%
2023	17,740,865	▲11%	58,271,042	▲20%	76,011,907	▲18%
2022	15,948,502	▲49%	48,569,571	▲83%	64,518,073	▲74%
2021	10,676,237	▲43%	26,505,670	▲66%	37,181,907	▲59%
2020	7,473,875	▼41%	15,936,505	▼60%	23,410,380	▼55%
2019	12,574,641	▲19244%	39,434,579	▲130482%	52,009,220	▲54529%
2018^{1}	65,006	Steady	30,199	Steady	95,205	Steady

^1: 2018 statistics correspond to the last 3 months of 2018 since the opening of the airport.

== Environmental impact ==
The airport is estimated by Climate Trace to have emitted 9.5 million tonnes of CO_{2} in 2023, making it the country's second largest greenhouse gas emitter.

== Ground transport ==
=== Metro ===
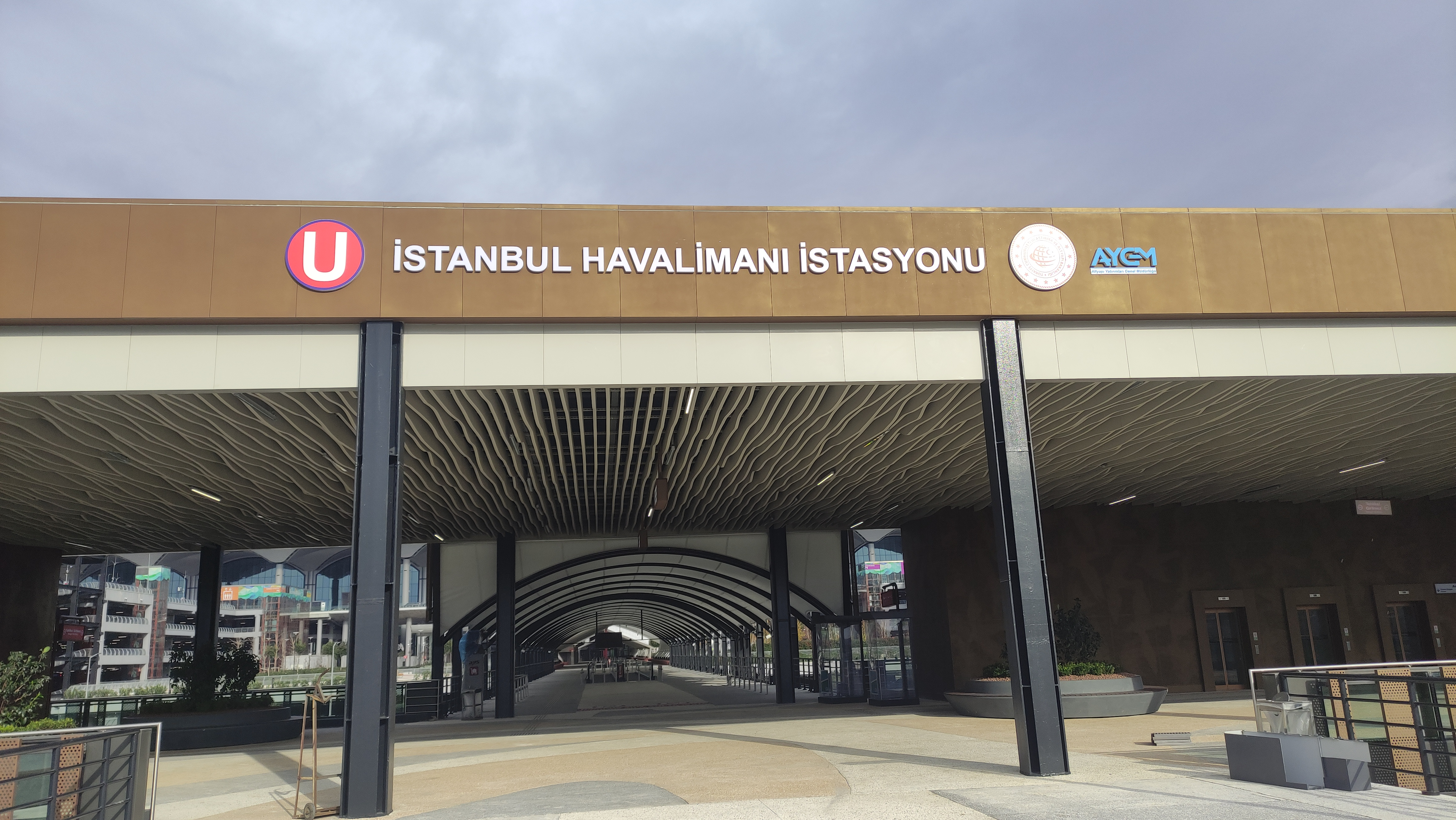
Metro station entrance

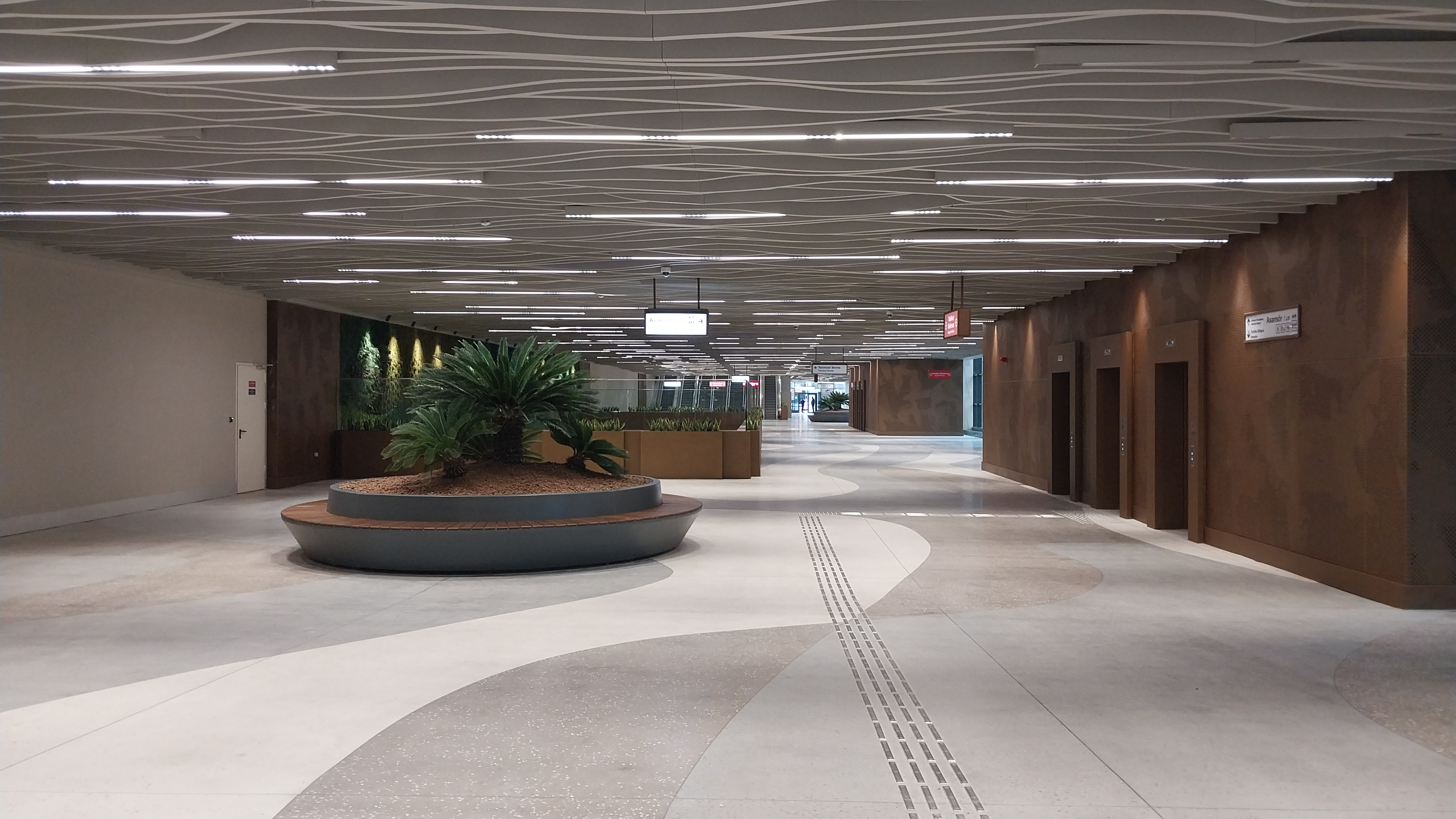
Istanbul Airport Metro Station

The M11 metro line opened on 22 January 2023, originally going to Kağıthane. With the Gayrettepe extension of the line being put into service on 29 January 2024, trains run eastward to Gayrettepe and westward to Arnavutköy. The section of the line extended to Halkalı entered service on 20 June 2026.

=== Bus ===
The airport is serviced from the city by public IETT and Havaist buses.

=== Car and taxi ===
The airport is reachable by car from the O-7 motorway or D.020 highway. Istanbul city taxis are available 24 hours a day outside the arrival and departure areas of the airport. A trip to Istanbul city centre by taxi takes approximately an hour.

=== Rail ===
There are plans for mainline railway to connect the airport to Çatalca and Halkalı, and via outer city bypass running over the Yavuz Sultan Selim Bridge across the Bosporus and connecting with the Anatolian rail network at Gebze but construction has been continuously delayed.

== See also ==
- Çanakkale 1915 Bridge
- Istanbul Canal
- Istanbul Sabiha Gökçen Airport
- List of airports with triple takeoff/landing capability
- List of the busiest airports in Europe
- Northern Marmara Motorway
- Yavuz Sultan Selim Bridge
