= Arnavutköy (district) =

- District and municipality
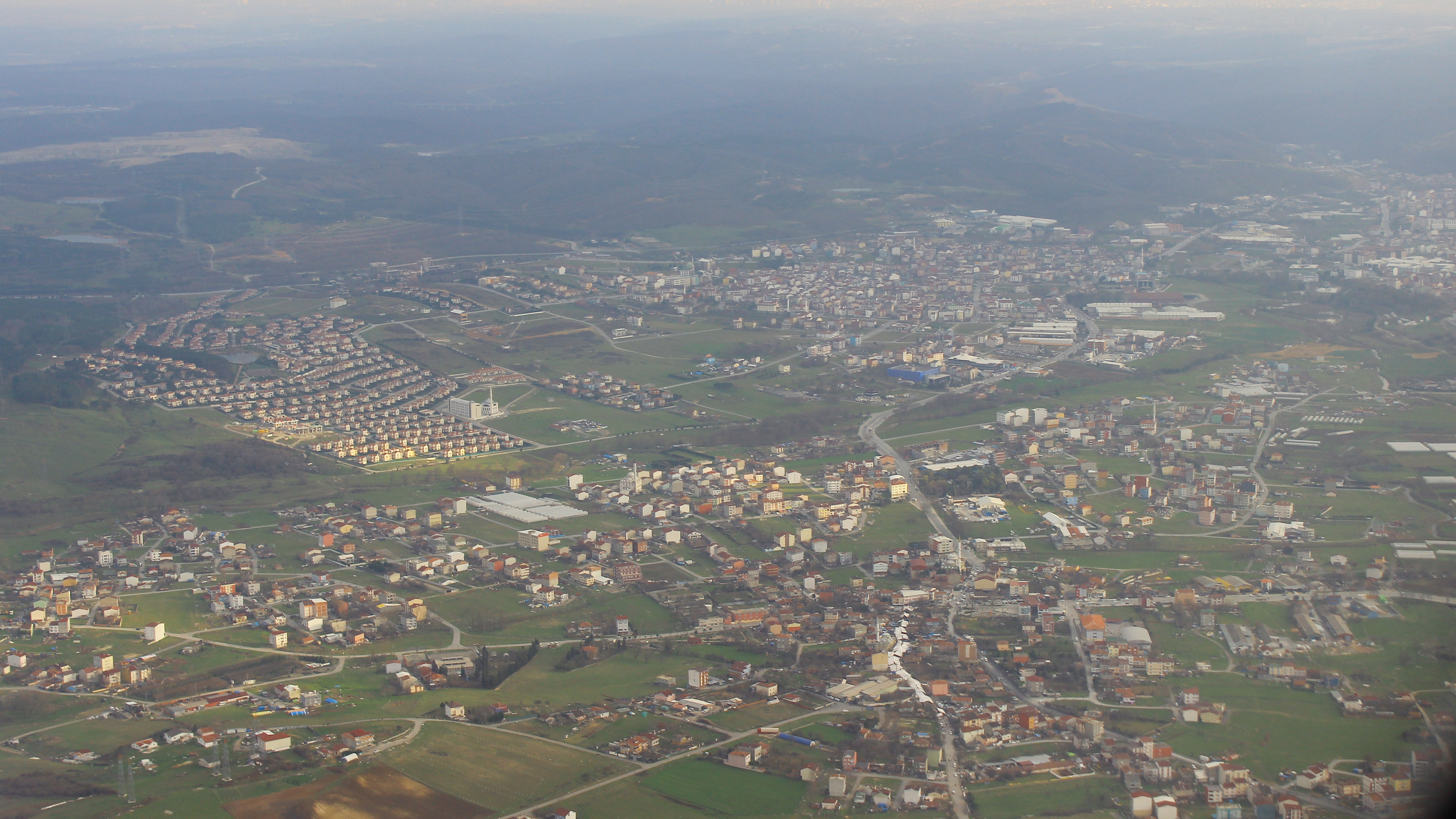
- Aerial view of the town

- Logo

- Map showing Arnavutköy District in Istanbul Province

- Location within Turkey Location within Istanbul
- Coordinates: 41°11′08″N 28°44′26″E
- Country: Turkey
- Province: Istanbul

Government
  - Mayor: Mustafa CANDAROĞLU (AKP)
- Area: 453 km^{2} (175 sq mi)
- Population (2022): 326,452
  - Density: 721/km^{2} (1,870/sq mi)
- Time zone: UTC+3 (TRT)
- Area code: 0212
- Website: www.arnavutkoy.bel.tr

Arnavutköy (meaning "Albanian village" in Turkish Turkish pronunciation: [aɾ.na.ʋut.cʰøj]) is a municipality and district of Istanbul Province, Turkey. Its area is 453 km^{2}, and its population is 326,452 (2022). It is located on the European side of Istanbul and borders the Black Sea. Istanbul Airport is in the district. The mayor is Mustafa Candaroğlu of the AK Party. Arnavutköy borders Çatalca to the west, Büyükçekmece to the southwest, Esenyurt and Başakşehir to the south, and Eyüp to the east. Karaburun is a seaside resort on the Black Sea.

In 2008 the district Arnavutköy was created from parts of the districts Çatalca and Gaziosmanpaşa. The urban part of the new district, 29 neighbourhoods, was established as a municipality. At the 2013 Turkish local government reorganisation, the rural part of the district was integrated into the municipality, the villages becoming neighbourhoods.

== Composition ==
There are 38 neighbourhoods in Arnavutköy District:

- Adnan Menderes
- Anadolu
- Arnavutköy Merkez
- Atatürk
- Baklalı
- Balaban
- Boğazköy İstiklal
- Bolluca
- Boyalık
- Çilingir
- Deliklikaya
- Dursunköy
- Durusu
- Fatih
- Hacımaşlı
- Hadımköy
- Haraççı
- Hastane
- Hicret
- İmrahor
- İslambey
- Karaburun
- Karlıbayır
- Mareşal Fevzi Çakmak
- Mavigöl
- Mehmet Akif Ersoy
- Mustafa Kemal Paşa
- Nene Hatun
- Ömerli
- Sazlıbosna
- Taşoluk
- Tayakadın
- Terkos
- Yassıören
- Yavuz Selim
- Yeniköy
- Yeşilbayır
- Yunus Emre
