= Bahrain International Airport =

Sole international airport serving Bahrain

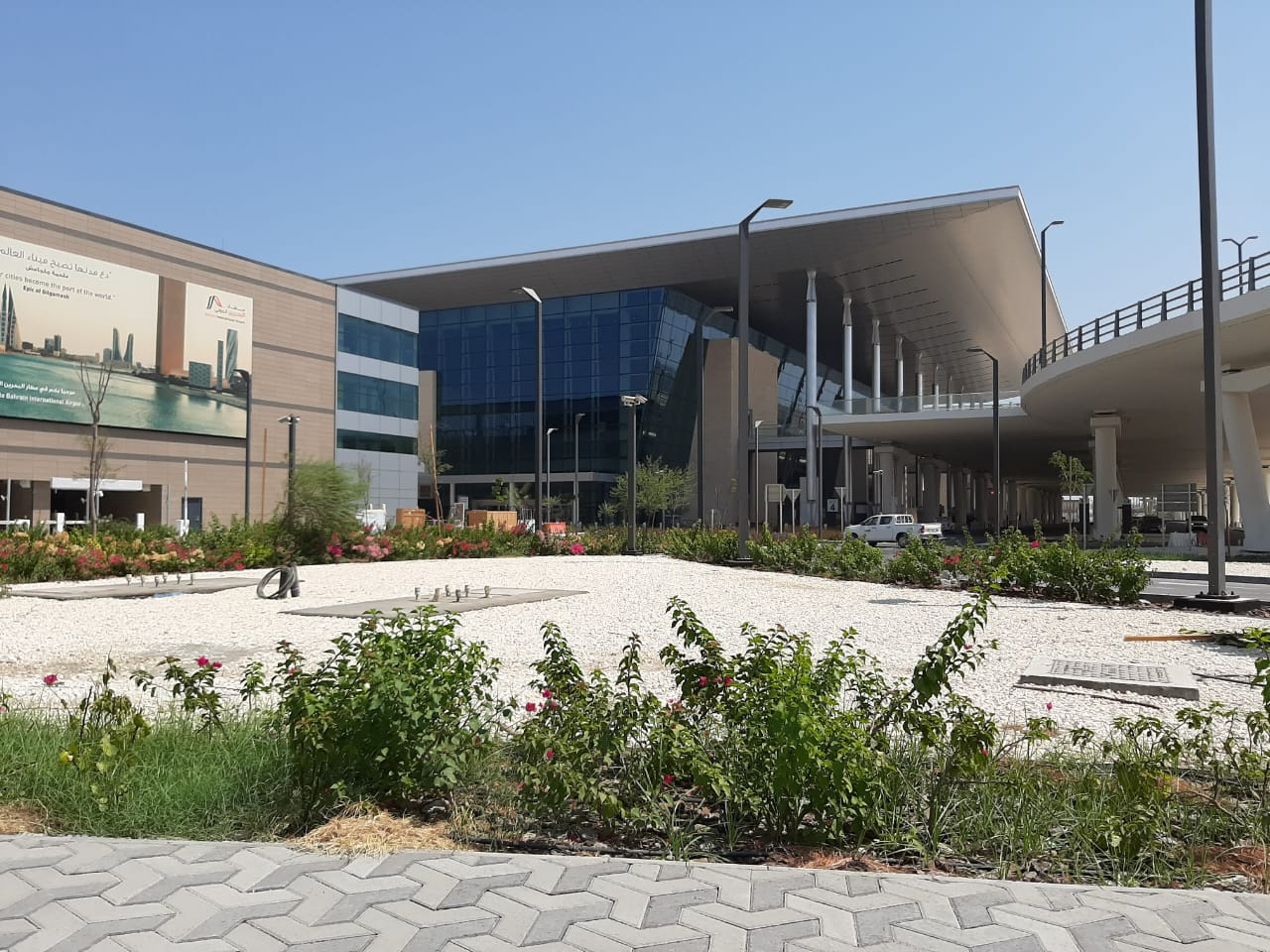
- IATA: BAH; ICAO: OBBI

Summary
- Airport type: Public
- Owner/Operator: Bahrain Airport Company
- Serves: Bahrain
- Location: Muharraq
- Opened: 1927; 99 years ago
- Hub for: Gulf Air; Kalitta Air; SNAS/DHL; Texel Air
- Elevation AMSL: 8 ft (2.4 m)
- Coordinates: 26°16′15″N 050°38′01″E
- Website: bahrainairport.bh

Maps
- Location in Al Muharraq, Bahrain BAH/OBBI (Asia)
- Interactive map of Bahrain International Airport

Runways
Direction	Length		Surface
Direction	m	ft	Surface
12L/30R	3,964	13,005	Asphalt
12R/30L	2,530	8,301	Asphalt

Statistics (2023 – 2024)
- Passengers: 9,350,580 ▲7%
- Aircraft movements: 101,534 ▲8%
- Cargo (MT): 392,811 ▲11%
- Source: Statistics from the Ministry of Transportation and Telecommunication

Bahrain International Airport (IATA: BAH, ICAO: OBBI) (Arabic: مطار البحرين الدولي, romanized: Maṭār al-Baḥrayn al-dwalī) is the international airport of Bahrain. Located on Muharraq Island, adjacent to the capital Manama and the city of Muharraq, it serves as the hub for the national carrier Gulf Air. The airport is managed by the Bahrain Airport Company. Established in 1927, it is the Arabian Peninsula's oldest international airport.

== History ==
=== Origins ===
The origins of Bahrain's international airport dates to 1927 when a chartered flight to Bahrain landed. The first scheduled commercial airliner to arrive in Bahrain, in 1932, was a flight from London to Delhi operated on a Handley Page H.P.42 aircraft named Hannibal. The H.P.42 carried only 24 passengers, and the flight from London had taken several days of flying at speeds of 100 miles per hour. Through this regularly scheduled service, Bahrain became established as one of the Persian Gulf's first international airports as well as one of the busiest airports in the Middle East.

During World War II, the airport was used by the United States Army Air Forces Air Transport Command Central African Wing, being designated as Station # 13. It functioned as a stopover en route to Abadan Airport, Iran or Sharjah Airport, in present-day UAE on the Karachi-Cairo route. From 1943 until Bahrain's independence in December 1971, the Royal Air Force maintained a military installation at the airfield known initially as RAF Bahrain and from 1963 as RAF Muharraq. The majority of these facilities were later acquired by the Bahraini flag carrier airline, Gulf Air, while a small portion continues to be utilized by the U.S. Navy as Aviation Support Unit (ASU) Bahrain.

=== 20th century ===
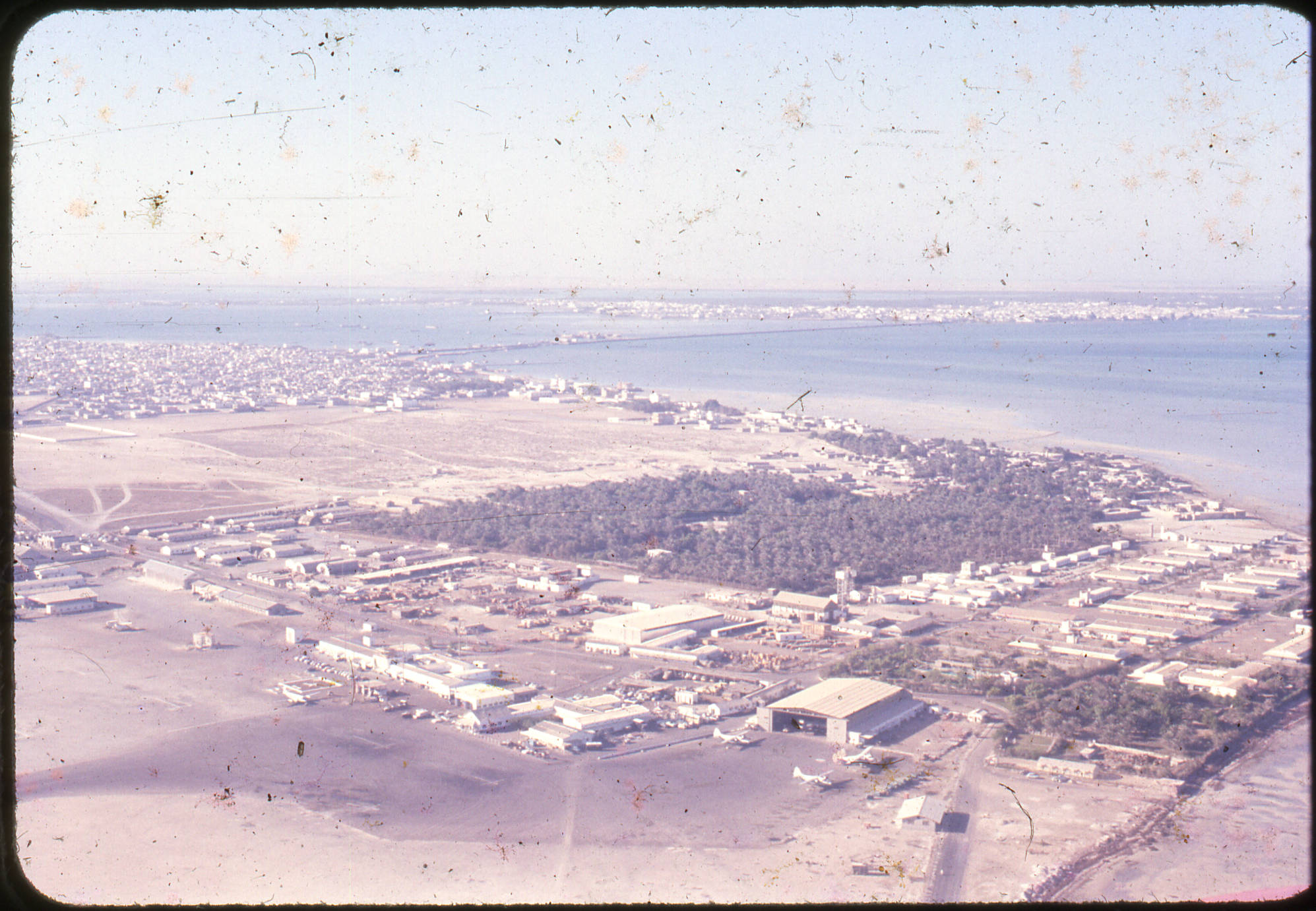
Photo of the airport hangars in 1961.

In 1936, the operation of H.P.42 aircraft from London to India via Bahrain had been stepped up to a twice-weekly frequency. In 1937, Bahrain saw the regular service of the Empire sea planes. The landing strip of these giants on the water was from where the marina club is located in Mina Salman today. From the 1950s, BOAC operated several services a week through Bahrain. These included weekly services to Karachi, Singapore, Hong Kong and three times a week to Sydney. 1950 was a significant year not only for Muharraq as an international airport, but also for Bahrain's commercial aviation history. In this year, a new local airline, Gulf Aviation Company, was formed – the forerunner of Gulf Air. The company started with only one aircraft, a second-hand Anson Mark II, which was used initially on services to Dhahran. However, within two years, the fleet had expanded to four de Havilland aircraft and DC-3s for use on a steadily growing network in the Persian Gulf. This established Bahrain on an international stage. It was easily the most modern and advanced airport in the Persian Gulf with a good runway, control tower, lighting, communication facilities and even restaurants. It began to attract other carriers such as Middle East Airlines, Air India, Air Ceylon and Iran Air – mostly operating Dakotas. In December 1961, a new passenger terminal opened at the airport. During 1970–1971, RAF Muharraq was scaled back and eventually closed. In December 1971, the airport opened new passenger facilities, which included a wide area that could accommodate four 747 aircraft. In 1976, the airport marked another significant first with the inauguration of supersonic flights, which saw the start-up of regular BA Concorde service between London and Bahrain. Pan Am introduced direct flights to New York in December 1976. It operated the route with Boeing 747SPs.

In the 1980s and 1990s, major facelifts took place and several major airline companies made the airport a destination. In 1994, a US$100 million terminal was inaugurated which boosted the airport's maximum capacity to 10 million passengers a year. In July 1994, Gulf Air started nonstop service to New York on Airbus A340s. Due to the length of the route, westbound flights occasionally had to make a refuelling stop.

=== 21st century expansion ===
In 2008, the airport was placed under the management of the newly created Bahrain Airport Company, which falls under the umbrella of the Gulf Air Holding Company, which in turn is owned by Mumtalakat, Bahrain's sovereign wealth fund. On 8 October 2009, it was announced that BHD 1.8 billion expansion of Bahrain International Airport will start in 2010. The expansion, planned over the next 30 years, intended to triple the passenger capacity to 27 million a year.

In April 2010, United Airlines began service to Washington, D.C., via Kuwait. The carrier flew the route with a Boeing 777. United left Bahrain in January 2016.

Since 2020 the airport has placed an increased effort to enhance the sustainability of the airport, including a LEED gold certification for the new Terminal Passenger Building in 2021, achieving a second consecutive ISO recertification for quality, environmental and occupational health and safety management systems in March 2024 and becoming the first airport in the world to achieve the International Air Transport Association Environmental Assessment Certification in November 2024.

== Facilities ==
=== Terminal ===
The airport's new terminal building, April 2024

The airport's new $1.1 billion terminal opened on 28 January 2021. At 210,000 square metres (2,300,000 sq ft), the Passenger Terminal increases Bahrain International Airport's (BIA) capacity to 14 million passengers and 130,000 air traffic movements per year with a handling capacity of 4,700 bags per peak hour. The new terminal cost 1.1 billion USD. The terminal features check-in halls, check-in desks, passport control booths, E-gates, security lanes, a 9,000 m^{2} (97,000 sq ft) duty-free retail space, lounges, food and beverage zones, 24 departure gates, and 7,000 new parking spaces both at-grade and in multi-story facilities.

=== Cargo ===
Through the airport's 25,000 m^{2} (270,000 sq ft) Cargo Terminal, a wide range of services are offered, including export cargo sales, transhipment, inter-airport trucking, and customs clearance. Bahrain is also the regional hub for DHL Aviation. With 115 weekly flights and 250 vehicles, DHL operates an integrated air and land network. Other cargo and logistics companies operating out of the airport include FedEx, TNT Express, Aramex, and Global Logistical Services (GLS).

=== Ground handling ===
Bahrain Airport Services (BAS) provides airport services at Bahrain International Airport (BIA). Supported by a 3,000-strong staff, BAS is an ISAGO-accredited Ground Service Provider. Overseeing the Kingdom's oil, gas, and petroleum assets, Bahrain Jet Fuel Company (BJFCO) is a joint venture between Bahrain Airport Company and the nogaholding. BJFCO is currently constructing a fuel farm complex in the northeastern area of the airport as part of a major restructuring of the Kingdom's aviation fueling industry.

=== Awal Private Terminal ===
The Awal Private Terminal at Bahrain International Airport is a dedicated facility for VIP passengers, government officials, and private aviation clients. The terminal offers private check-in, security screening, and immigration procedures. The 4,000 m^{2} (43,000 sq ft) terminal is operated by Hala Bahrain, a subsidiary of Bahrain Airport Company.

== Airlines and destinations ==
=== Passenger ===
Airlines	Destinations	Refs
Air Arabia	Abu Dhabi, Sharjah	
Air India Express	Delhi, Kannur, Kochi, Kozhikode, Mangaluru, Thiruvananthapuram	
AJet	Istanbul–Sabiha Gökçen	
Azerbaijan Airlines	Baku	
British Airways	London–Heathrow	
Egyptair	Cairo	
Emirates	Dubai–International	
Ethiopian Airlines	Addis Ababa	
Etihad Airways	Abu Dhabi	
Fly Jinnah	Islamabad, Lahore	
FlyArystan	Seasonal: Almaty	
Flydubai	Dubai–International	
Flynas	Medina, Riyadh	
Gulf Air	Abu Dhabi, Amman–Queen Alia, Athens, Baku, Bangkok–Suvarnabhumi, Bengaluru, Bodrum, Cairo, Casablanca, Chennai, Colombo–Bandaranaike, Dammam, Delhi, Dhaka, Doha, Dubai–International, Frankfurt, Gassim, Goa–Dabolim, Guangzhou, Hyderabad, Islamabad, Istanbul, Jeddah, Karachi, Kochi,Kozhikode, Kuwait City, Lahore, Larnaca, London–Gatwick, London–Heathrow, Kuala Lumpur–International, Malé, Manchester, Manila, Medina, Milan–Malpensa, Moscow–Sheremetyevo, Mumbai, Munich, Muscat, Nairobi–Jomo Kenyatta, Najaf, New York–JFK, Paris–Charles de Gaulle, Riyadh, Rome–Fiumicino, Shanghai–Pudong, Singapore, Tbilisi, Thiruvananthapuram; Seasonal: Al Ula, El Alamein, Geneva, Málaga, Nice, Salalah; Seasonal charter: Sarajevo, Sochi	
IndiGo	Kochi, Mumbai	
Jazeera Airways	Kuwait City	
Kuwait Airways	Kuwait City	
Oman Air	Muscat	
Pakistan International Airlines	Lahore, Sialkot	
Pegasus Airlines	Istanbul–Sabiha Gökçen; Seasonal: Trabzon	
Qatar Airways	Doha	
Red Wings Airlines	Sochi	
Royal Jordanian	Amman–Queen Alia	
SalamAir	Muscat, Salalah	
Saudia	Jeddah, Riyadh	
Smartwings	Seasonal charter: Bratislava, Prague	
Southwind Airlines	Seasonal charter: Antalya, Trabzon	
SunExpress	Charter: Antalya, Istanbul–Sabiha Gökçen, Trabzon	
Turkish Airlines	Istanbul	

=== Cargo ===
Airlines	Destinations
AeroLogic	Frankfurt, Leipzig/Halle, Singapore
Cargolux	Luxembourg
DHL Aviation	Abu Dhabi, Amman–Queen Alia, Amsterdam, Baghdad, Bangkok–Suvarnabhumi, Bengaluru, Brussels, Cairo, Cincinnati, Dubai–International, Hong Kong, Istanbul, Jeddah, Kandahar, Karachi, Kuwait City, Lahore, Liège, New York–JFK, Nairobi–Jomo Kenyatta, Sharjah
Emirates SkyCargo	Dubai–Al Maktoum
Lufthansa Cargo	Frankfurt
Qatar Airways Cargo	Doha
SpiceXpress	Delhi
Turkish Cargo	Istanbul

== Statistics ==
=== Traffic figures ===
Traffic by calendar year, official ACI statistics
	Passengers	Change from previous year	Aircraft operations	Change from previous year	Cargo (metric tons)	Change from previous year
2005	5,581,503	▲8.50%	73,891	▲1.88%	334,832	▲10.91%
2006	6,696,025	▲19.97%	80,538	▲9.00%	357,277	▲6.70%
2007	7,320,039	▲9.32%	87,417	▲8.54%	385,278	▲7.84%
2008	8,758,068	▲19.65%	101,203	▲17.77%	369,822	▼4.01%
2009	9,053,631	▲3.37%	103,727	▲2.49%	342,734	▼7.32%
2010	8,898,197	▼1.72%	106,355	▲2.53%	329,937	▼3.73%
2011	7,793,527	▼12.41%	102,068	▼4.03%	292,147	▼11.45%
2012	8,479,266	▲8.80%	105,931	▲3.78%	262,386	▼10.19%
2013	7,371,651	▼13.06%	90,837	▼14.25%	245,146	▼6.57%
2014	8,102,502	▲9.91%	96,193	▲5.90%	276,390	▲12.75%
2015	8,586,645	▲5.97%	100,625	▲4.61%	256,408	▼7.23%
2016	8,766,151	▲2.09%	101,345	▲0.72%	263,956	▲2.94%
2017	8,477,331	▼3%	95,966	▼5%	289,331	▲10%
2018	9,082,707	▲7%	96,030	▲0%	288,235	▲0%
2019	9,578,797	▲5%	95,486	▼1%	291,017	▲1%
2020	2,269,232	▼ -76%	38,182	▼ -60%	300,205	▲3%
2021	3,020,942	▲33%	51,177	▲34%	325,801	▲9%
2022	6,888,284	▲128%	82,487	▲61%	380,414	▲17%
2023	8,711,018	▲26%	93,648	▲14%	353,542	▼ -7%
2024	9,350,580	▲7%	101,534	▲8%	392,811	▲11%
2025	9,739,928	▲4%	100,997	▼1%	405,217	▲3%
Source: Airports Council International, World Airport Traffic Reports & Bahrain's Ministry of Transportation and Telecommunications (MTT) Annual Reports. (years 2005, 2006, 2007, 2009, 2011, 2012, 2013, 2014, 2015, 2016, 2017 2018, 2019 and 2025)

=== Busiest routes ===
Busiest routes at Bahrain International Airport (by number of flights weekly)
Rank	City	Country	Number of flights
1	Dubai	United Arab Emirates	104
2	Doha	Qatar	57
3	Riyadh	Saudi Arabia	54
4	Kuwait City	Kuwait	52
5	Abu Dhabi	United Arab Emirates	47
6	Istanbul	Turkey	35
7	Jeddah	Saudi Arabia	30
8	Dammam	Saudi Arabia	28
9	Muscat	Oman	26
10	Cairo	Egypt	23
11	London, Mumbai, Sharjah	United Kingdom, India, United Arab Emirates	21
12	Amman, Delhi	India	20
13	Kochi	India	17
14	Kozhikode	India	14
15	Chennai	India	10

== Ground transportation ==
The airport is situated in central Muharraq and has transportation connections with the capital city Manama through the Airport Avenue roadway and Shaikh Isa Causeway. Bahrain International Airport is served 24/7 by several taxi operators. Bahrain Public Transport Company (BPTC) provides buses.

== Accidents and incidents ==
- On 12 June 1950, an Air France Douglas DC-4 crashed 5.5 km (3.4mls) into the sea SE of Bahrain because the pilot did not keep an accurate check of his altitude and rate of descent during the approach, allowing the aircraft to impact the sea. Pilot fatigue also may have played a factor. 46 out of the 52 passengers and crew were killed.
- On 14 June 1950, just two days later, an Air France Douglas DC-4 flying the same leg crashed again into the sea at night SE of Bahrain because of similar errors on approach two days prior. Also BAH lacked radio landing aids and suitable runway approach lights. 40 of the 53 passengers and crew died.
- On 9 September 1970, British Overseas Airways Corporation Flight 7755, a Vickers VC10, flying from Bombay (now Mumbai) to London via Bahrain and Beirut was hijacked after departing Bahrain and forcibly landed at Dawsons Field in Jordan. The hijacking was done by a Popular Front for the Liberation of Palestine sympathizer who wanted to influence the British government to free Leila Khaled.
- In August 2000, a Gulf Air Airbus 320 (Gulf Air Flight 072) from Cairo crashed when landing at the airport. All 135 passengers and eight crew died.
- In August 2017, an American F-18 fighter jet crash-landed at the airport, with the pilot safely ejecting.

== See also ==
- List of airports in Bahrain
- Transport in Bahrain
- List of the busiest airports in the Middle East
