= Philia (Thrace) =

Ancient coastal town in Thrace

Coordinates: 41°20′17″N 28°40′36″E

Philia (Ancient Greek: Φιλία) was a town of ancient Thrace, on the coast of the Euxine, situated on a promontory of the same name. It was situated 310 stadia southeast of Salmydessus.

Its site is located near Karaburun in European Turkey.
