= Texel Air =

Cargo airline and MRO based in the Kingdom of Bahrain

IATA	ICAO	Call sign
-	XLR	TEXEL
- Founded: 2013; 13 years ago
- Commenced operations: 2014; 12 years ago
- Hubs: Bahrain International Airport
- Subsidiaries: Texel Air Australasia
- Fleet size: 5
- Parent company: Chisholm Enterprises
- Headquarters: Samaheej
- Key people: John Chisholm (Chairman and founder)
- Employees: 100
- Website: www.texelair.com

Texel Air is a cargo airline and MRO based in Bahrain. It was founded in 2013 and commenced operations in 2014. The airline has its main hub at the Bahrain International Airport and its fleet consists of one Boeing 737-300F aircraft, two Boeing 737-800BCF as well as two Boeing 737-700FC FlexCombi, capable of swiftly converting between passenger and cargo operations.

== Texel Air Australasia ==
The company has a subsidiary in New Zealand, named Texel Air Australasia.

== Fleet ==
=== Current fleet ===
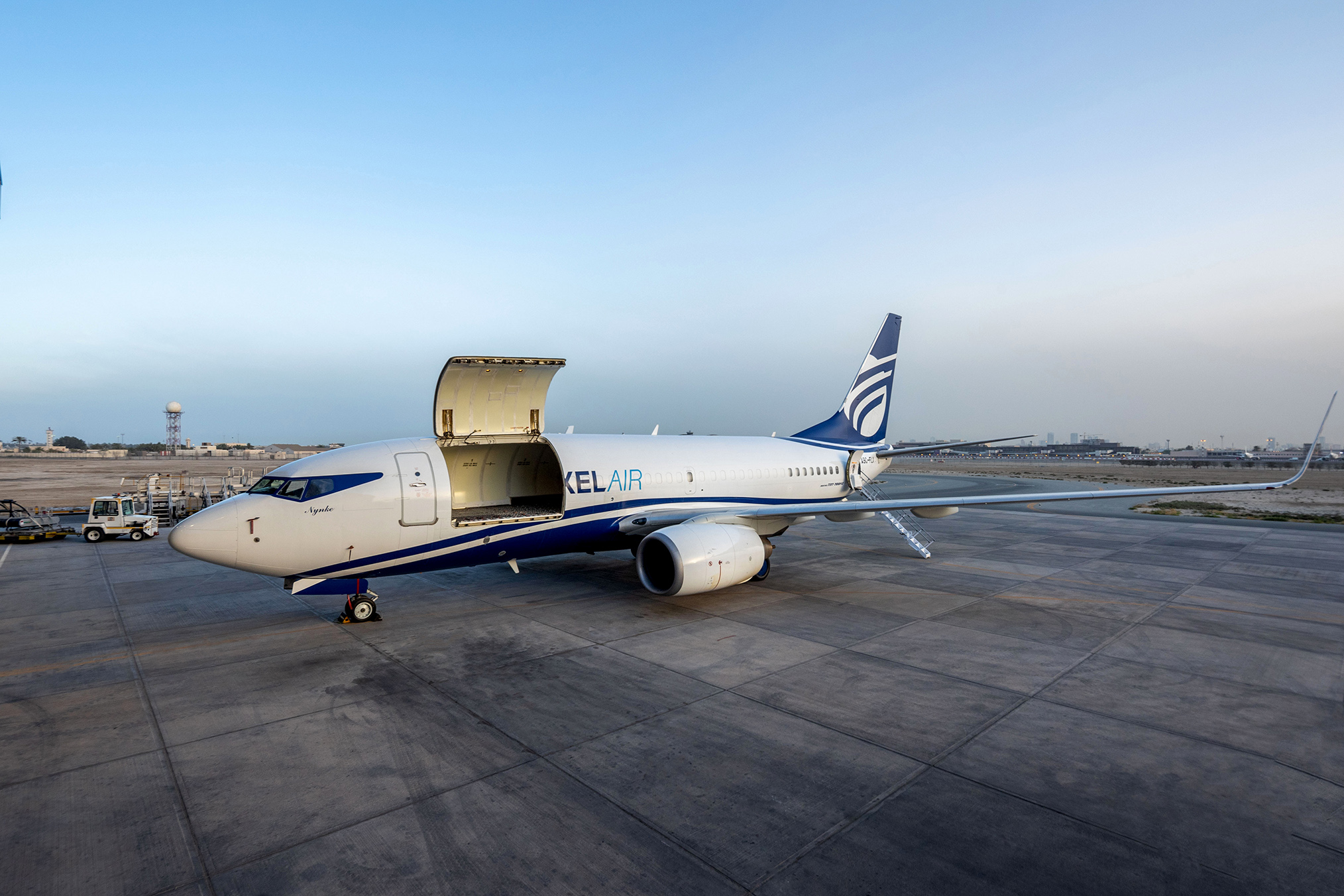
FlexCombi

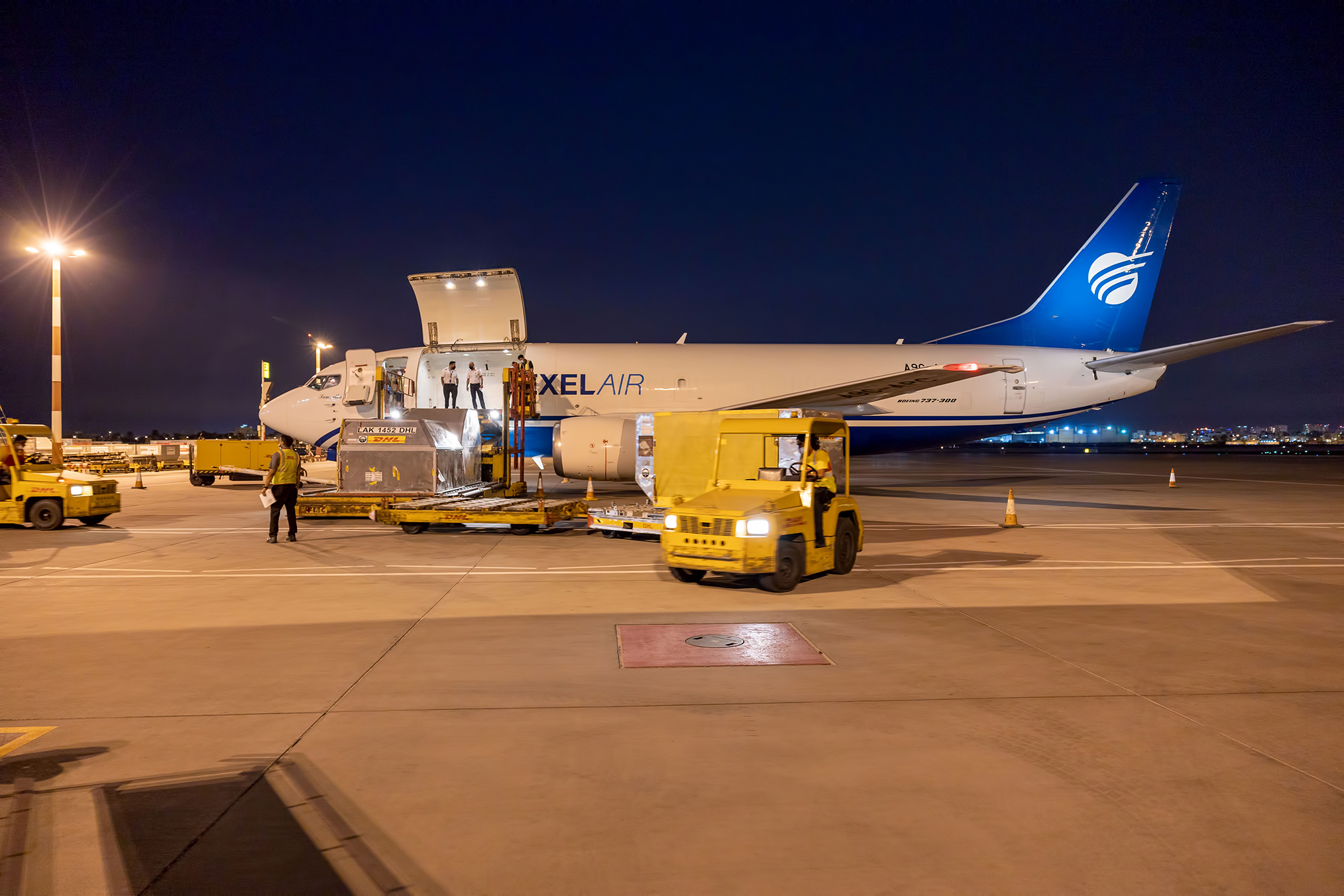
B737-300F Texel Air

As of August 2025, Texel Air operates the following aircraft:

Texel Air fleet
Aircraft	In fleet	Orders	Historic	Capacity	Notes
Boeing 737-700FC	2		-	FlexCombi	
Boeing 737-800BCF	3	1	-	Cargo	
Total	5	1		-	-

=== Former fleet ===
- 4 Boeing 737-300F

== See also ==
- List of airlines of Bahrain
