= Terkos Dam =

- Interactive map of Terkos Dam
- Location: Turkey

Terkos Dam is a lake-dam near the village of Durusu in the Çatalca district of Istanbul Province, Turkey. The development of the project on Lake Durusu (ancient name Terkos) was realised by the Turkish State Hydraulic Works, and entered into service in 1971. It is the traditional water supply of the European part of Istanbul.

== See also ==
- List of dams and reservoirs in Turkey
