= List of airlines of Bahrain =

This is a list of airlines currently operating in Bahrain.

== Scheduled airlines ==
Airline	Image	IATA	ICAO	Callsign	Commenced operations	Notes
Gulf Air		GF	GFA	GULF AIR	1950	

== Charter airlines ==
Airline	Image	IATA	ICAO	Callsign	Commenced operations	Notes
Comlux Middle East					2010	

== Executive aviation ==
Airline	Image	IATA	ICAO	Callsign	Commenced operations	Notes
Bexair (Bahrain Executive Air Service)			BXA		2001	Formed by Arabian Support & Services Co Ltd (ASACO)

== Cargo airlines ==
Airline	Image	IATA	ICAO	Callsign	Commenced operations	Notes
DHL International Aviation ME		ES	DHX	DILMUN	1979	
Texel Air			XLR	TEXEL	2013	

== See also ==
- List of defunct airlines of Asia
- List of airlines
