= Texel Air Australasia =

New Zealand cargo airline

IATA	ICAO	Call sign
TT	TNZ	TEXEL CARGO
- Founded: February 2023; 3 years ago
- Commenced operations: 2023; 3 years ago
- Fleet size: 6
- Destinations: 4
- Parent company: Texel Air
- Headquarters: Auckland Airport
- Key people: John Chisholm (Chairman and founder)
- Website: http://www.texelair.co.nz

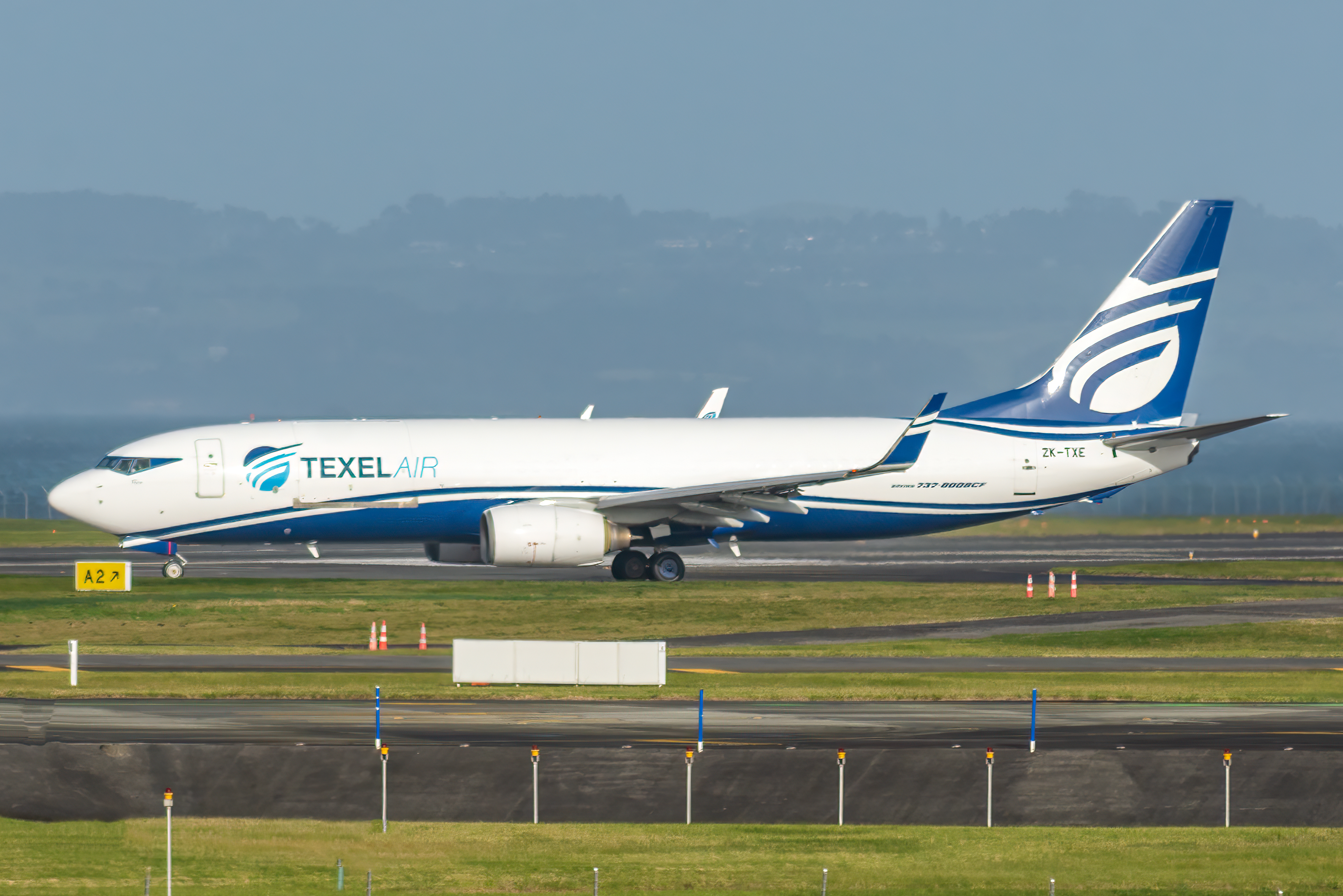
Texel Air 737 at Auckland Airport in 2023

Texel Air Australasia is a cargo airline that was established in New Zealand in March 2023. The airline is a subsidiary of Bahrain-based cargo airline Texel Air. As of 8 April 2024 the airline has 5 Boeing 737-800BCF in their fleet.

Texel Air Australasia also won a contract in March 2024 for Team Global Express.

== Fleet ==
As of August 2025, Texel Air Australasia operates the following aircraft:

Texel Air Australasia fleet
Aircraft	In fleet	Orders	Capacity	Notes
Boeing 737-800BCF	6	1	Cargo	ZK-TXA to ZK-TXF. (ZK-TXA to ZK-TXD on lease to Team Global Express.)
Total	6	1		

== See also ==
- List of airlines of New Zealand
