= Karaburun, Arnavutköy =

Village in Turkey

Karaburun
- Neighbourhood
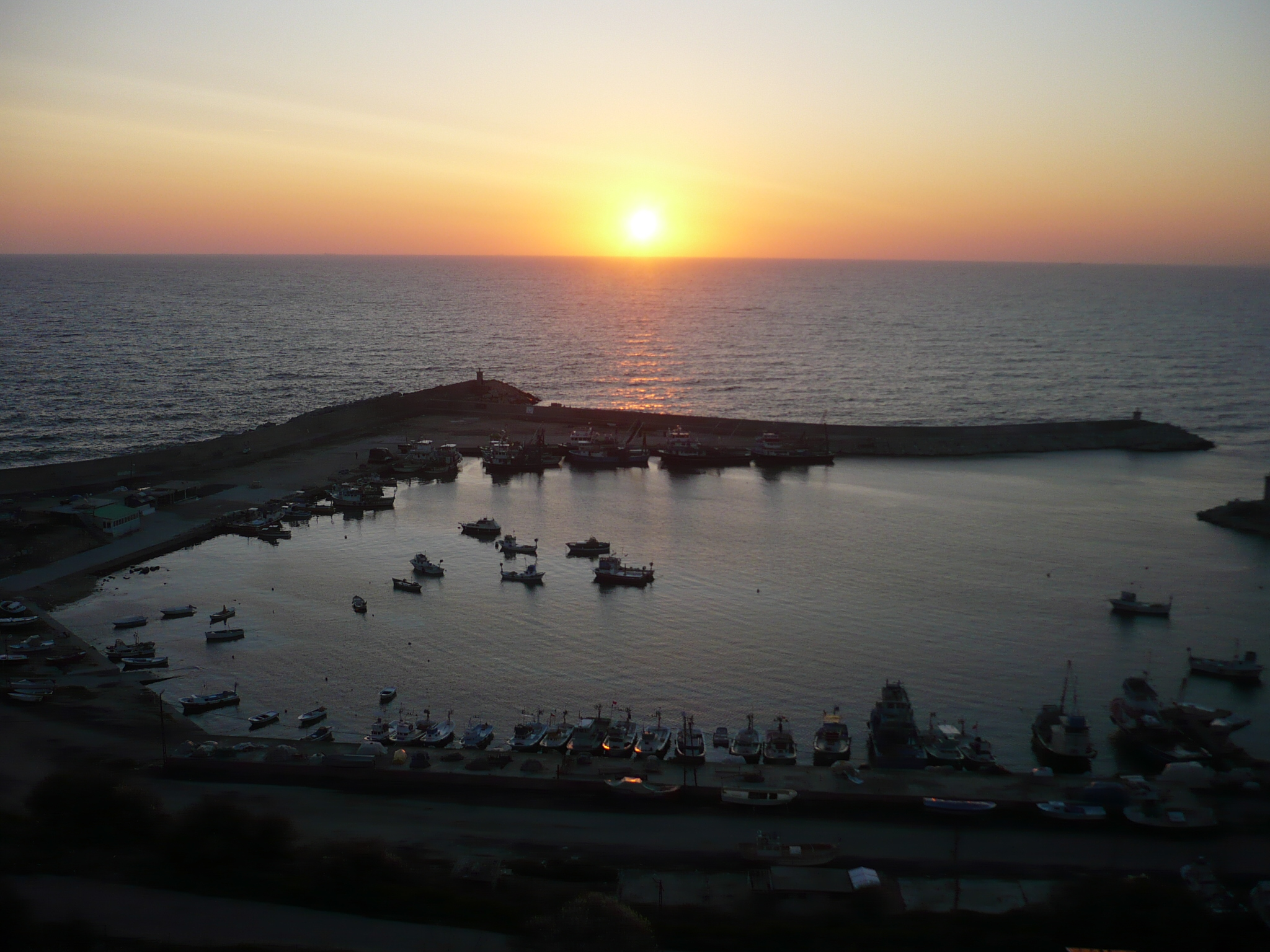
- Port of Karaburun and the cape with the lighthouse (far left)

- Location within Turkey Location within Istanbul
- Coordinates: 41°20′45″N 28°40′55″E
- Country: Turkey
- Province: Istanbul
- District: Arnavutköy

Government
  - Muhtar: Mustafa Karali
- Area: 7.52 km^{2} (2.90 sq mi)
- Population (2022): 1,813
  - Density: 241/km^{2} (624/sq mi)
- Time zone: UTC+3 (TRT)
- Postal code: 34277
- Area code: 0212

Karaburun is a neighbourhood in the municipality and district of Arnavutköy, Istanbul Province, Turkey. Its population is 1,813 (2022).

== Location ==
Karaburun is located on the Black Sea coast about 29 km (18 mi) west of the northern entry of Istanbul Strait. It is situated north of the villages Durusu and Yeniköy.

== Overview ==
With its long and wide sand beach, Karaburun is a popular tourist destination being the second-most visited Black Sea seaside resort in the European part of Istanbul Province after Kilyos. The village covers an area of 7.52 km^{2} (2.90 sq mi). The headman of the village is Mustafa Karaali.

== Facilities ==
Primary health care is provided by Mustafa Yenigün Family Health Center. The village has a primary school and three mosques, Merkez Mosque, Alperenler Mosque and Hz. Hamza Mosque. There are three public parks in the settlement, Karaburun Park, Nevbahar Park and Erguvan Park. The Port of Karaburun is home to offshore fishing boats.

== Lighthouse ==
A lighthouse is situated atop a 54-metre-high (177 ft) hill on the cape (Karaburun means literally "Cape Black"), on the site of a ruined Genovese castle. It was erected by French engineers in 1860, following the Crimean War (1853–1856). Royal Navy personnel then established a marine salvage service. The lighthouse is 12 m (39 ft) tall, flashes every five seconds, and its light is visible at a range of 15 mi (24 km). The light is ranked third in the world in terms of luminous power.

The original lighthouse structure is reasonably well-preserved. It features decorative lion-head figures as hoppers on the eaves of the lighthouse's original copper dome. Rainwater accumulated on the eaves is designed to flow from the open mouths of the lions. The pole in the garden and the long rope stretched to the pole have been used for years to rescue passengers with the chairlift system if a ship is stranded in shallow waters in bad weather conditions.
