= Durusu =

- Neighbourhood
- Country: Turkey
- Province: Istanbul
- District: Arnavutköy
- Population (2022): 746
- Time zone: UTC+3 (TRT)

Durusu or Terkos (Greek: Δέρκος, Derkos; also Δέλκη Delke, Δέλκος Delkos, and Δέρκοι Derkoi) is a neighbourhood in the municipality and district of Arnavutköy, Istanbul Province, Turkey. Its population is 746 (2022). It lies close to the namesake Lake Durusu and the Terkos Dam.

== History ==
The village is attested since Classical Antiquity as Derkos/Delkos/Derkoi, but Emperor Anastasius I (r. 491–518) raised it to the status of a city and rebuilt it as a forward stronghold for the defence of Constantinople. It was also probably at the same time created an episcopal see In the first half of the 6th century, Derkos was known as a stronghold of the Monophysites.

After the capture of Constantinople by the Fourth Crusade and the partition of the Byzantine Empire among the Crusader leaders, Derkos became part of the new Latin Empire until 1247, when the Nicaean emperor John III Doukas Vatatzes captured it. Derkos served as the base of Andronikos IV Palaiologos in his failed usurpation attempt in 1373 against his father John V Palaiologos (r. 1341–1376, 1379–1391). By the 1420s, Derkos was one of the few cities still held by the Byzantines along the Black Sea coast. As such, it formed the appanage of the future Constantine XI Palaiologos (r. 1449–1453) in 1421, when his father Manuel II Palaiologos (r. 1391–1425) assigned various portions of the empire to his sons.

The town was taken by the Ottomans during their preparations for their final siege of Constantinople, in early 1453 or perhaps even in 1452. The moats and earthworks erected by the Ottomans during this operation were allegedly still visible in the 1660s, when the traveller Evliya Çelebi visited the city. In the late 19th century, the town had a Christian population of 400, many of whom were Bulgarians.

A church dedicated to St. George still existed until the early 20th century, but today few Byzantine and ancient remains are visible; some Roman-era inscriptions are located in the Archaeological Museum of Istanbul. The medieval fortress still exists in a partially well-preserved state, some 1 km west of the settlement, close to the lake, although large sections were torn down in the late 20th century to furnish building material.
