= DHL International Aviation ME =

Cargo airline

DHL Air (Bahrain) B.S.C. (C)

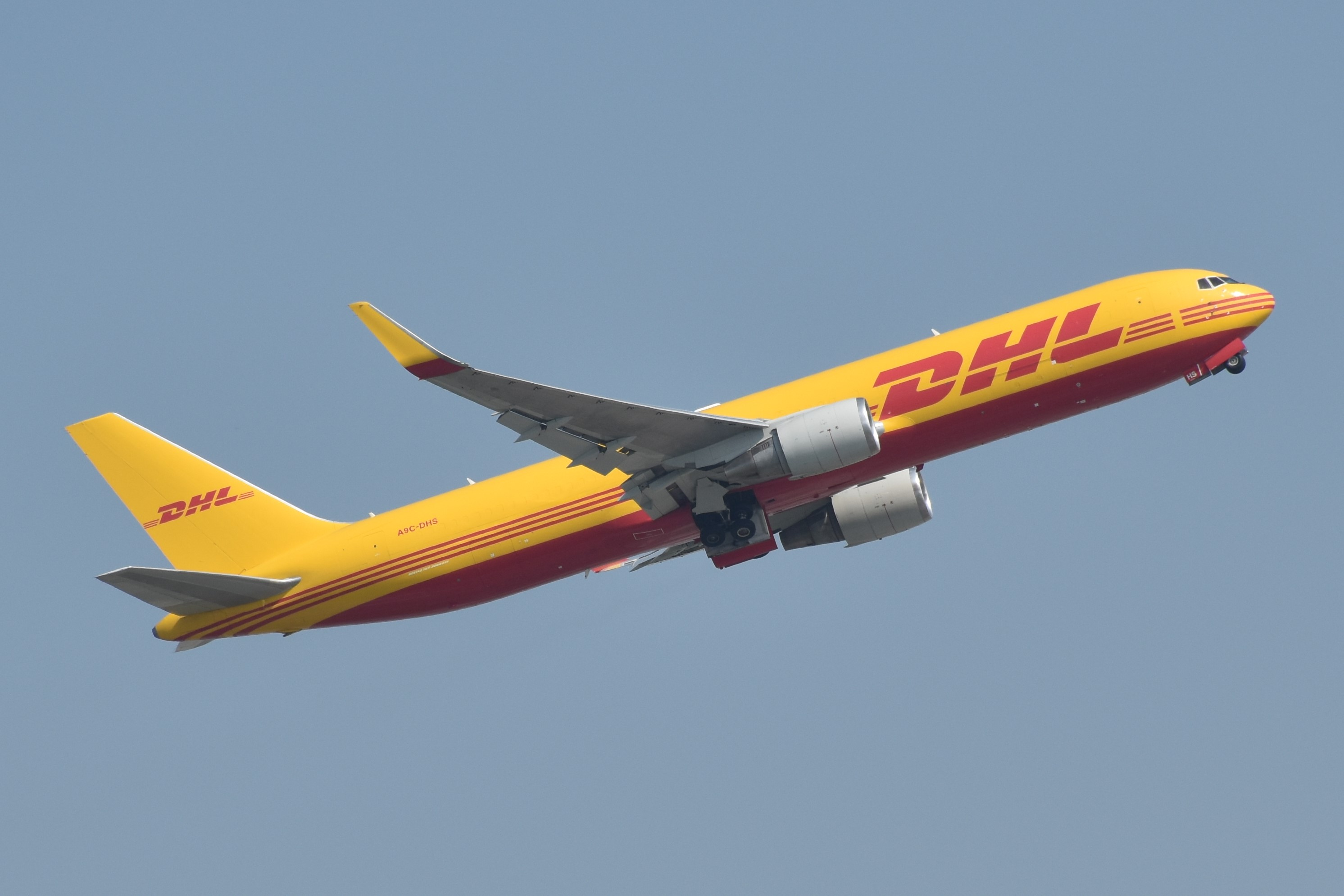
IATA	ICAO	Call sign
ES	DHX	DILMUN
- Founded: 1979; 47 years ago
- AOC #: BH-03
- Hubs: Bahrain International Airport
- Secondary hubs: Dubai International Airport
- Focus cities: Beirut, Cairo, Amman, Baghdad, Jeddah, Riyadh, Asmara, Djibouti, Nairobi, Muscat, Abu Dhabi, DWC, Karachi, Lahore, Bangalore, Hong Kong, Milan-Malpensa, Leipzig
- Fleet size: 10
- Destinations: 26
- Parent company: DHL
- Headquarters: Muharraq, Bahrain
- Key people: Gavin Staines; Reynel Rivera; Steve O'Shea; Yaver Rashid; Vanessa Thornton
- Employees: 265
- Website: www.dhl.com

DHL Air (Bahrain) B.S.C. (C) (branded as DHL) is a cargo airline based in Bahrain. It employs 265 workers to dispatch, fly and maintain a fleet of Boeing 767 freighters operating under a Bahraini AOC. DHL International is the central platform for DHL Air Network Operations in the Middle East. It is wholly owned by Deutsche Post and operates the group's DHL-branded parcel and express services in the Middle East and North Africa as part of DHL Aviation. Its main base is Bahrain International Airport.

== History ==
The airline began dedicated cargo flights between Bahrain and Riyadh in 1979 with a Fokker F27 Friendship. In 1980, with demand for a reliable overnight service increasing, the Fairchild Metro were introduced. With its fast cruising speed of 250 knots, this aircraft proved to be ideal for this type of service and destinations soon expanded to include Dubai, Kuwait and Jeddah. In 2004, larger jet aircraft were introduced with the deployment of 6 Boeing 727s. The Middle East is today connected into DHL's network via dedicated long haul flights from the US, Europe and Asia.

== Destinations ==
Country	City	Airport	Notes	Refs
Bahrain	Muharraq	Bahrain International Airport	Hub	
Belgium	Brussels	Brussels Airport		
Djibouti	Djibouti City	Djibouti–Ambouli International Airport	Focus city	
Egypt	Cairo	Cairo International Airport	Focus city	
Eritrea	Asmara	Asmara International Airport	Focus city	
Hong Kong	Hong Kong	Hong Kong International Airport	Focus city	
India	Bangalore	Kempegowda International Airport	Focus city	
Iraq	Baghdad	Baghdad International Airport	Focus city	
Jordan	Amman	Queen Alia International Airport	Focus city	
Kenya	Nairobi	Jomo Kenyatta International Airport	Focus city	
Kuwait	Kuwait City	Kuwait International Airport		
Lebanon	Beirut	Beirut–Rafic Hariri International Airport	Focus city	
Oman	Muscat	Muscat International Airport	Focus city	
Pakistan	Karachi	Jinnah International Airport	Focus city	
Pakistan	Lahore	Allama Iqbal International Airport	Focus city	
Saudi Arabia	Jeddah	King Abdulaziz International Airport	Focus city	
Saudi Arabia	Riyadh	King Khalid International Airport	Focus city	
United Arab Emirates	Abu Dhabi	Abu Dhabi International Airport	Focus city	
United Arab Emirates	Dubai	Dubai International Airport	Hub	
United Arab Emirates	Sharjah	Sharjah International Airport		

== Fleet ==
=== Current fleet ===
As of August 2025, DHL International Aviation ME operates the following aircraft:

DHL International fleet
Aircraft	In service	Orders	Notes
Boeing 767-300ER/BCF	5	—	
Boeing 767-300ER/BDSF	5	—	
Eviation Alice	—	12	Deliveries from 2024
Total	10	12	

=== Former fleet ===
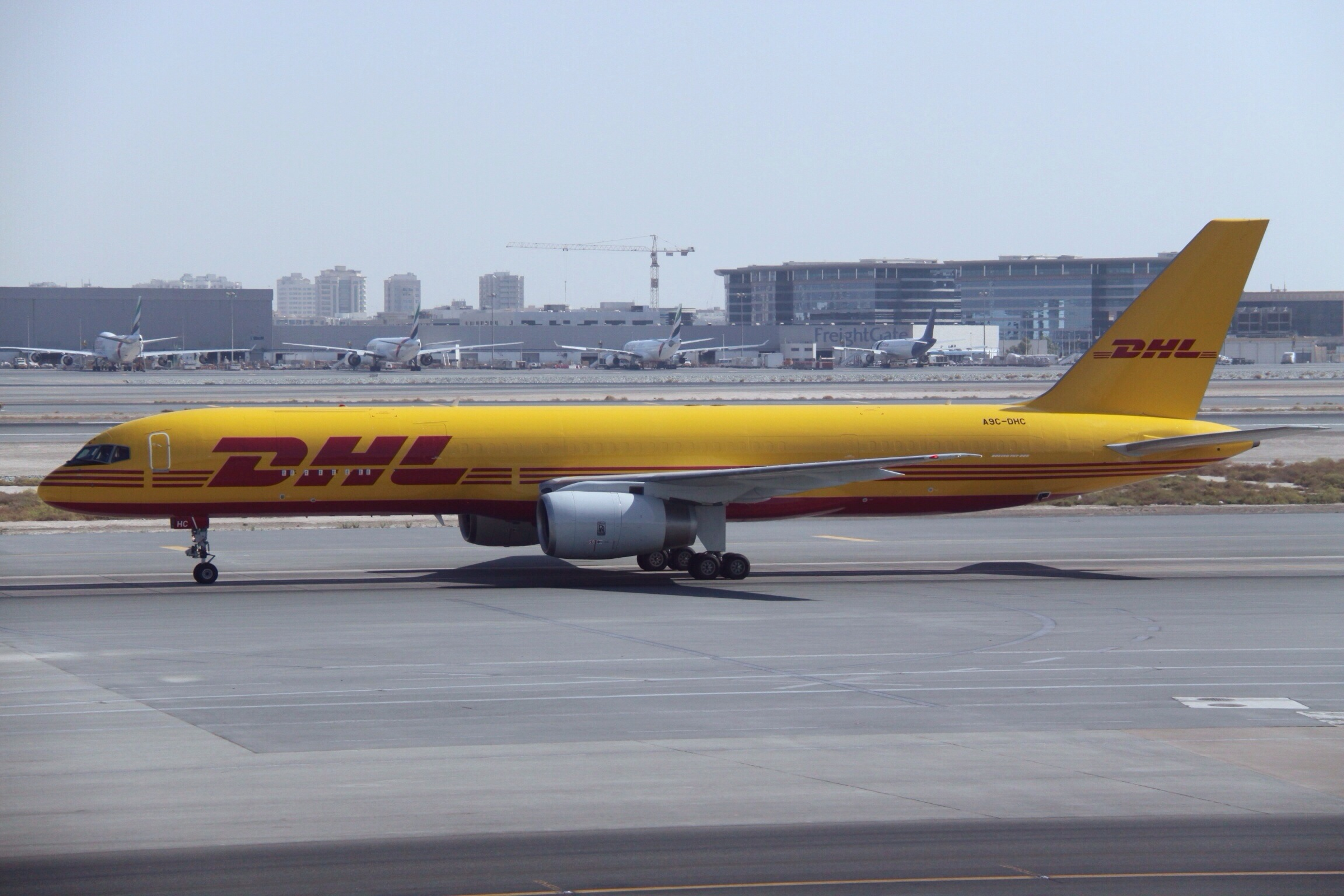
A former DHL International Boeing 757-200PCF taxiing at Dubai International Airport in 2013

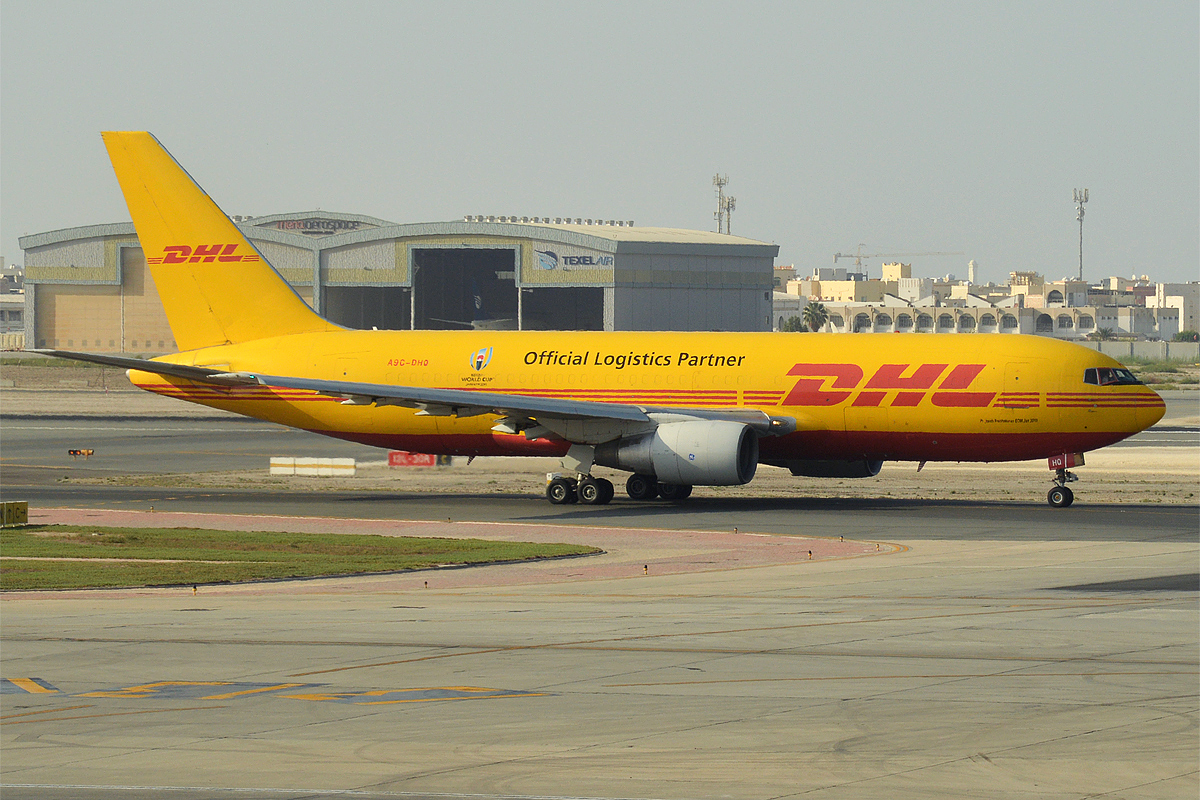
A former DHL International Boeing 767-200BDSF at Bahrain International Airport in 2019

DHL International formerly operated the following aircraft:

- Boeing 727-200F
- Boeing 757-200PCF
- Boeing 757-200SF
- Boeing 767-200BDSF
- Convair CV-540
- Fairchild Metro 23
- Fairchild Metro III
- Fokker F27 Friendship

== Accidents and incidents ==
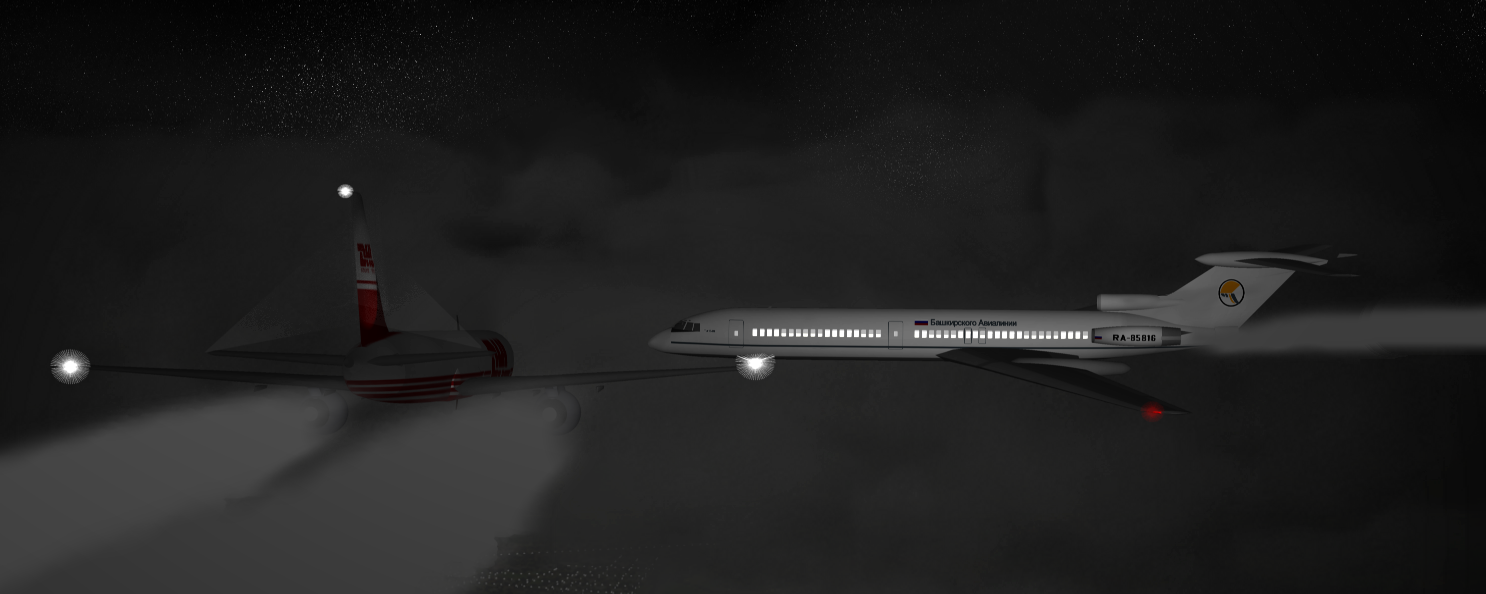
CGI rendering of the collision

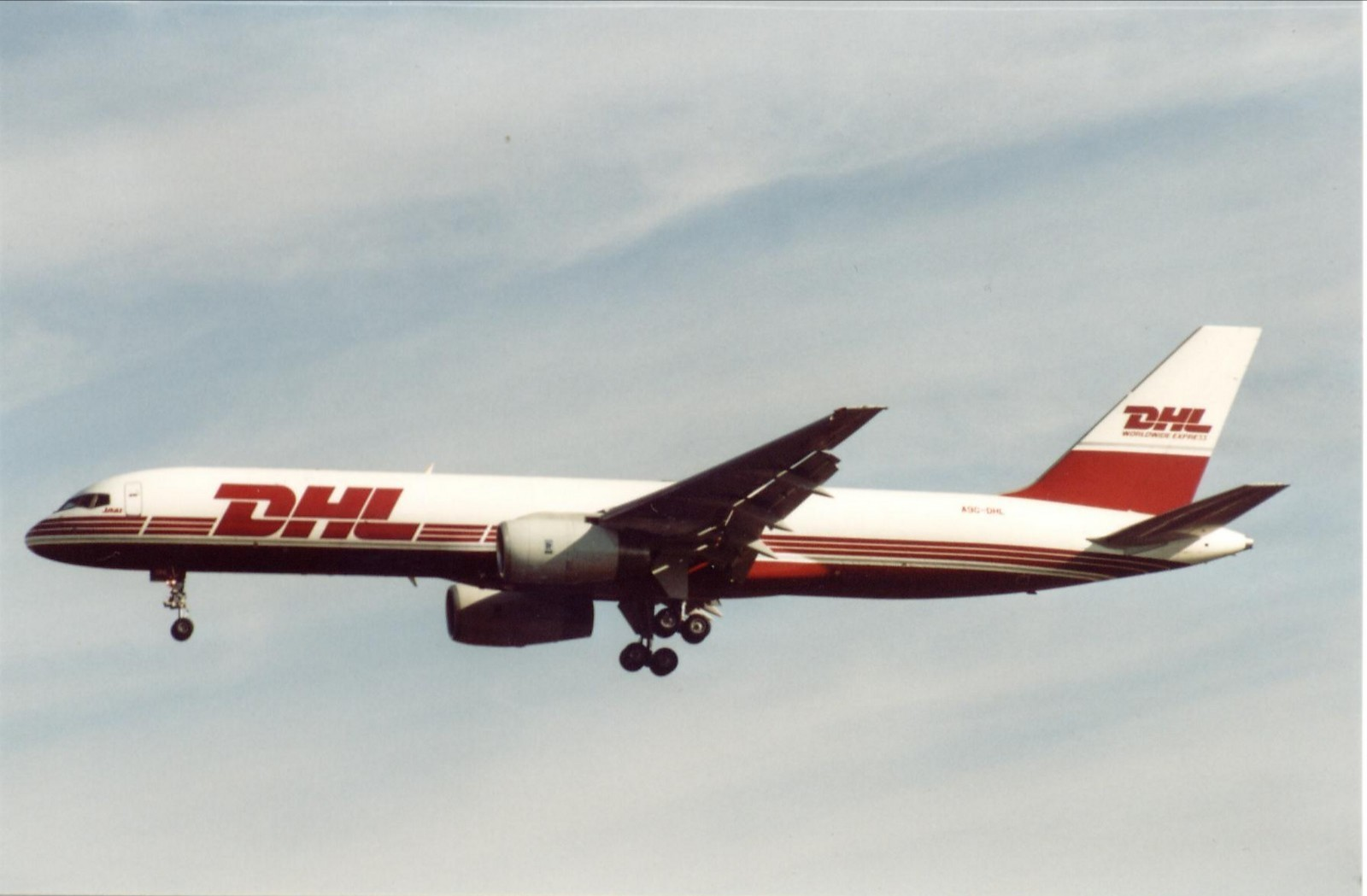
A9C-DHL, the 757-200PF involved in the collision.

- 2002 Überlingen mid-air collision: On July 1, 2002, DHL Flight 611, a Boeing 757-200PF (registered as A9C-DHL) was flying from Bergamo, Italy, to Brussels, Belgium. The aircraft was flying over southern Germany when it collided with a BAL Bashkirian Airlines Tupolev Tu-154M on a charter flight from Moscow, Russia to Barcelona, Spain, over the city of Überlingen near the German-Swiss border. The DHL plane's vertical stabilizer slammed into the fuselage of the Tu-154. The collision killed the 2 crew members on board the Boeing 757, and all 69 passengers and crew on the Tupolev, mostly Russian schoolchildren from Bashkortostan on a vacation, organized by the local UNESCO committee, to the Costa Dorada region of Spain.

== See also ==
- List of airlines of Bahrain
