= Philia (Greco-Roman magic) =

Greco-Roman love magic

Out of all of the forms of love magic that existed in the Greco-Roman world, the two most common were eros and philia. Unlike eros, which was more commonly used by men, philia magic was utilized by women and others who were considered to be social inferiors.

Since there was an emphasis on service to the state in Greco-Roman culture, these social inferiors felt like they were doing their country a service. If a woman was capable of repairing her broken marriage and improving her husband's interaction with the neighbors through magic, society was benefiting as a whole. Despite this protective purpose seen by women, philia spells were looked down on by men. They were a great source of anxiety because men saw them as tools used by the social inferiors to hijack power from the male-dominated hierarchy.

== The use of spells ==
Through the use of spells, women were hoping to bring out the pleasant personal qualities of their significant others and make them increasingly submissive in order to strengthen their bond. The spells consisted of many objects found in the everyday life of a woman including narcotics, amulets, rings, knotted cords, and facial ointments. Although the violent and passionate images typically depicted in eros were not found in philia, it is important to remember that like eros, the ultimate purpose of philia magic was to take control of the victim.

== Wine ==
Wine was considered to be the most basic love potion by the Greeks and had to be handled with as much care as any other spell. This was because the conjurer had to gauge the effectiveness of the serving sizes. The right amount of wine would lead to sexual arousal; too much would lead to impotence. Herbal aphrodisiacs and mood enhancers such as oleander, cyclamen, and mandrake were also used in combination with wine for enhancements.

== Narcotics and potions ==
The narcotics used in potions were designed to sedate men in progressive stages beginning with cheerfulness/ sexual arousal, progressing to the weakening of vitality, and finally ending with sleep. Potions were placed in one of two categories: irritants and those used to increase relaxation and affection. As with all narcotics, there was always a risk of severe harm or death being caused by accidental overdoses. The effects of the two potion categories were difficult to distinguish in small doses, but not in large amounts. Substantial doses of irritants caused cramping, pain, and insomnia while relaxants led to drowsiness and eventually a loss of consciousness.

== Rings and gemstones ==
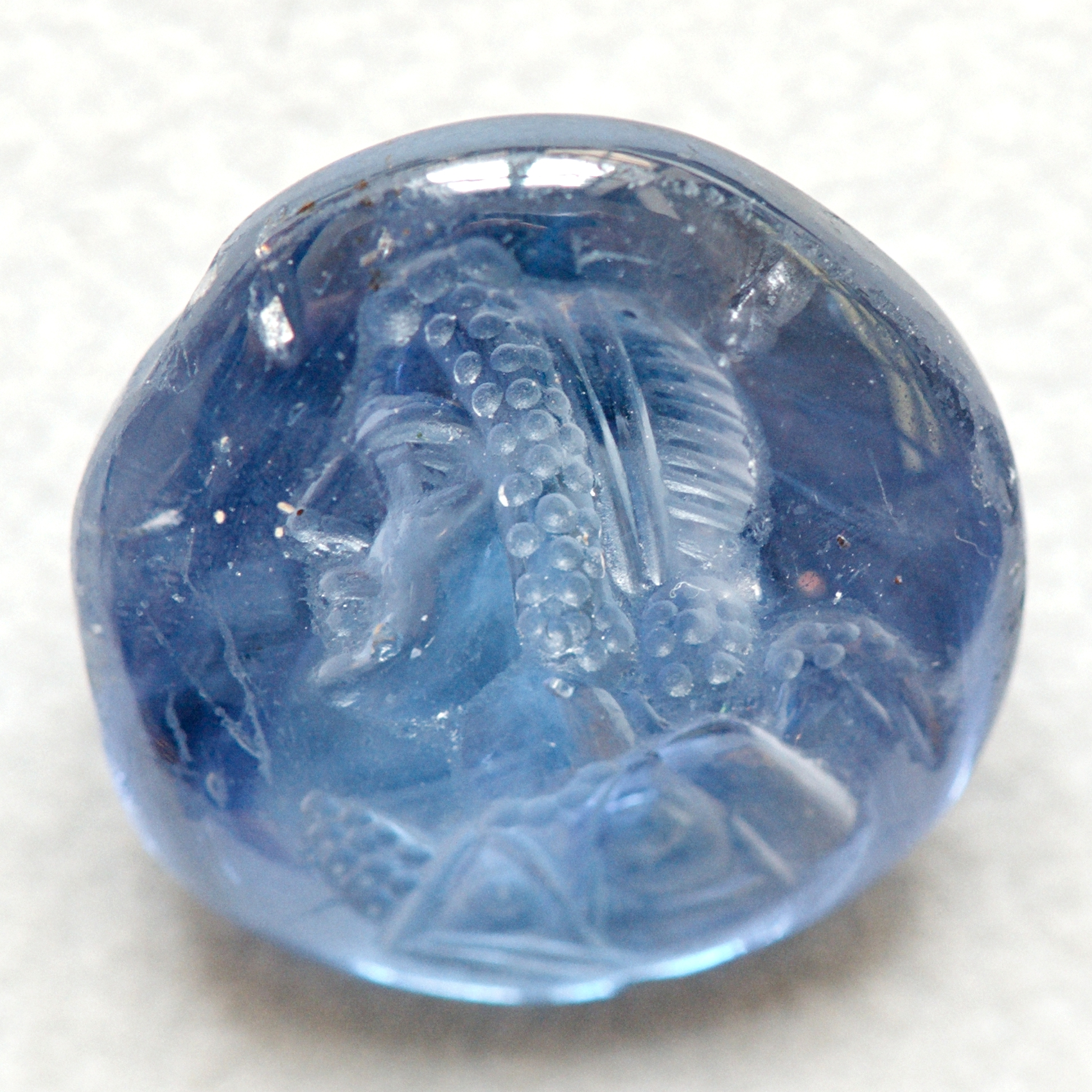
2nd century BC sapphire showing a Ptolemaic princess as Nike, Greek goddess of victory

In the Cyranides, a Greek manual focusing on magical properties, there are descriptions of different gemstones that were thought to possess certain powers.

- Dendrites – led to the love of the gods and success in the world
- Sapphire – resulted in a victory in every lawsuit brought against you
- Aerizusa/Aerizon – effective around leaders when placed within a gold ring

There were many cases in Greek and Neo-Assyrian cultures where social inferiors would stand before their superiors armed only with a magical stone set in a ring. They were hoping that the rings would increase their goodwill and help them build favorable relationships with the hierarchy.

A little ring for success and for charm (charis) and for victory… The world has nothing better than this. For when you have it with you, you will always get whatever you ask from anybody. Besides, it calms the angers (orgai) of kings and master. Wearing it, whatever you may say to anyone, you will be believed, and you will be pleasing to everybody.
