= List of airlines with more than 100 destinations =

This list only contains airlines that fly passengers to over 100 destinations, excluding defunct airlines.

Airline	Number of destinations	Remarks	Country of origin
Turkish Airlines	384		Turkey
United Airlines	374		United States
American Airlines	351		United States
Delta Air Lines	315		United States
China Southern Airlines	232		China
China Eastern Airlines	225		China
Ryanair	223	including Ryanair DAC, Malta Air, Buzz, Ryanair UK and Lauda	Ireland
Air China	219		China
British Airways	217		United Kingdom
Lufthansa	217		Germany
Air Canada	210		Canada
Qatar Airways	196		Qatar
Air France	195		France
Wizz Air	185	including Wizz Air Hungary, Wizz Air Malta and Wizz Air UK	Hungary
Ethiopian Airlines	178		Ethiopia
KLM	170		Netherlands
EasyJet	164	Including EasyJet Switzerland	United Kingdom
Eurowings	164		Germany
Pegasus Airlines	161		Turkey
Emirates	152		United Arab Emirates
AirAsia	>150	Total of AirAsia Group	Malaysia
IndiGo	144		India
Sichuan Airlines	142		China
Azul Brazilian Airlines	138	Including Azul Conecta	Brazil
Flydubai	138		United Arab Emirates
Iberia	137		Spain
Transavia France	135		France
China Express Airlines	133		China
Alaska Airlines	128		United States
Scandinavian Airlines	125		Denmark, Norway, Sweden
Allegiant	124		United States
Austrian Airlines	121		Austria
Swiss	120		Switzerland
Aegean Airlines	118	Including Subsidiary	Greece
Southwest Airlines	117		United States
JetBlue	114		United States
Chengdu Airlines	113		China
Etihad	110		United Arab Emirates
Korean Air	108		South Korea
Royal Air Maroc	108		Morocco
Norwegian Air Shuttle	105	Total of Norwegian Group	Norway
WestJet	104		Canada
Aeroflot	104		Russia
Hainan Airlines	104		China
Finnair	104		Finland
AJet	107		Turkey
SunExpress	107		Germany, Turkey
Qantas	108		Australia
Tianjin Airlines	104		China
Transavia (NL)	104		Netherlands
Spring Airlines	103		China
Vueling	103		Spain
Xiamen Airlines	103		China
EgyptAir	102		Egypt
LOT Polish Airlines	102		Poland
Saudia	102		Saudi Arabia

== See also ==
- Largest airlines in the world
- List of airlines by countries served
