= List of airlines by countries served =

This list contains airlines that fly passengers to over 30 countries, excluding defunct airlines.

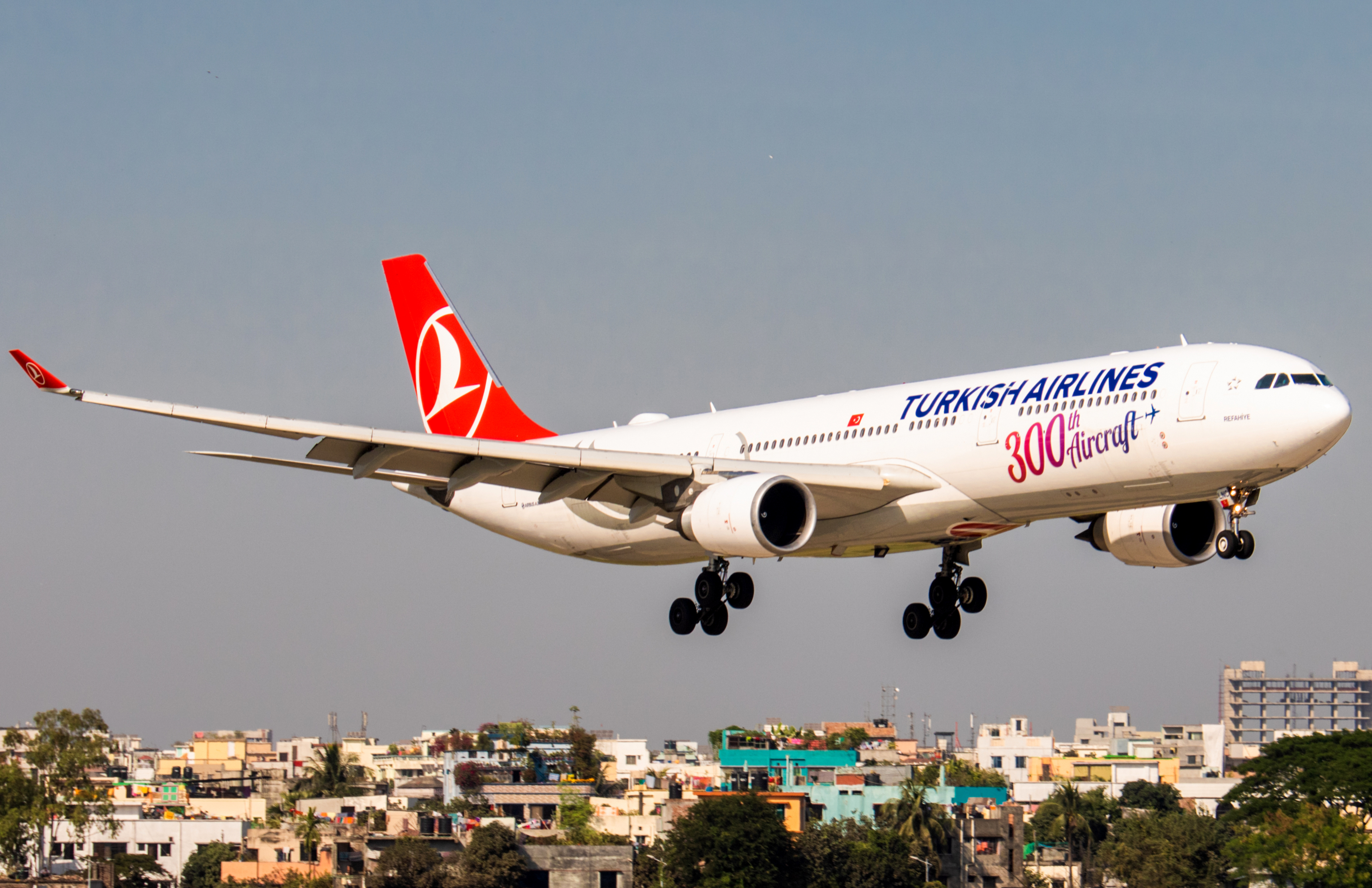
Turkish Airlines serves the largest number of countries

Airline	Number of countries	Remarks	Country of origin
Turkish Airlines	130		Turkey
Air France	94		France
Qatar Airways	92		Qatar
Ethiopian Airlines	87		Ethiopia
British Airways	79		United Kingdom
Emirates	79		United Arab Emirates
Lufthansa	76		Germany
United Airlines	75		United States
KLM	66		Netherlands
American Airlines	64		United States
Delta Air Lines	64		United States
Air Canada	64		Canada
LOT Polish Airlines	62		Poland
EgyptAir	61		Egypt
Flydubai	58		United Arab Emirates
Wizz Air	55	including Wizz Air Hungary, Wizz Air Malta, Wizz Air UK and Wizz Air Abu Dhabi	Hungary
Pegasus Airlines	54		Turkey
Swiss	51		Switzerland
Austrian Airlines	48		Austria
China Southern Airlines	47		China
Etihad	47		United Arab Emirates
Royal Air Maroc	47		Morocco
Air China	46		China
Iberia	46		Spain
Aegean Airlines	45		Greece
Scandinavian Airlines	45		Denmark, Norway, Sweden
AirBaltic	42		Latvia
Brussels Airlines	42		Belgium
Eurowings	41		Germany
Saudia	40		Saudi Arabia
Condor	39		Germany
EasyJet	38	Including EasyJet Switzerland	United Kingdom
Finnair	38		Finland
Norwegian Air Sweden	38		Sweden
China Eastern Airlines	37		China
Korean Air	37		South Korea
Norwegian Air Shuttle	37	AOC registered in Norway	Norway
SunExpress	37		Germany, Turkey
AJet	36		Turkey
Ryanair	36	including Ryanair DAC, Malta Air, Buzz, Ryanair UK and Lauda	Ireland
Transavia France	36		France
Air Arabia	35	AOC registered in Sharjah	United Arab Emirates
flynas	35		Saudi Arabia
Kenya Airways	34		Kenya
JetBlue	33		United States
Kuwait Airways	33		Kuwait
Luxair	33		Luxembourg
Air India	32		India
Air Serbia	32		Serbia
Cathay Pacific	32		Hong Kong
Copa Airlines	32		Panama
Hainan Airlines	32		China
Royal Jordanian	32		Jordan
Singapore Airlines	32		Singapore
WestJet	32		Canada
Discover Airlines	31		Germany
Gulf Air	31		Bahrain
IndiGo	31		India
TAP Air Portugal	31		Portugal

== See also ==
- Largest airlines in the world
- List of airlines with more than 100 destinations
- Lists of airlines
