= List of Southwest Airlines destinations =

List of airline destinations

As of May 2026, Southwest Airlines has scheduled flights to over 100 destinations in 43 states, Puerto Rico, Mexico, Central America and the Caribbean, the newest being Alaska on May 15, 2026. The airline has 15 focus cities and operates over 4,000 flights each day.

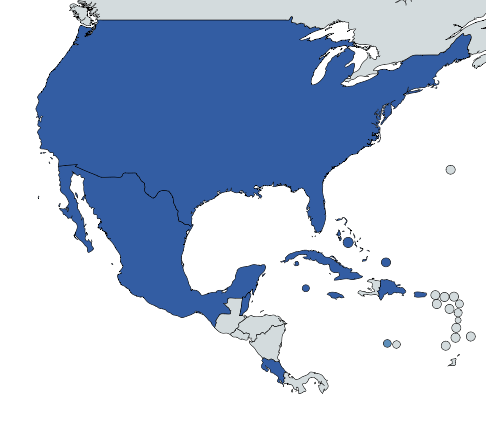
Countries served by Southwest as of October 2024

== Destinations ==
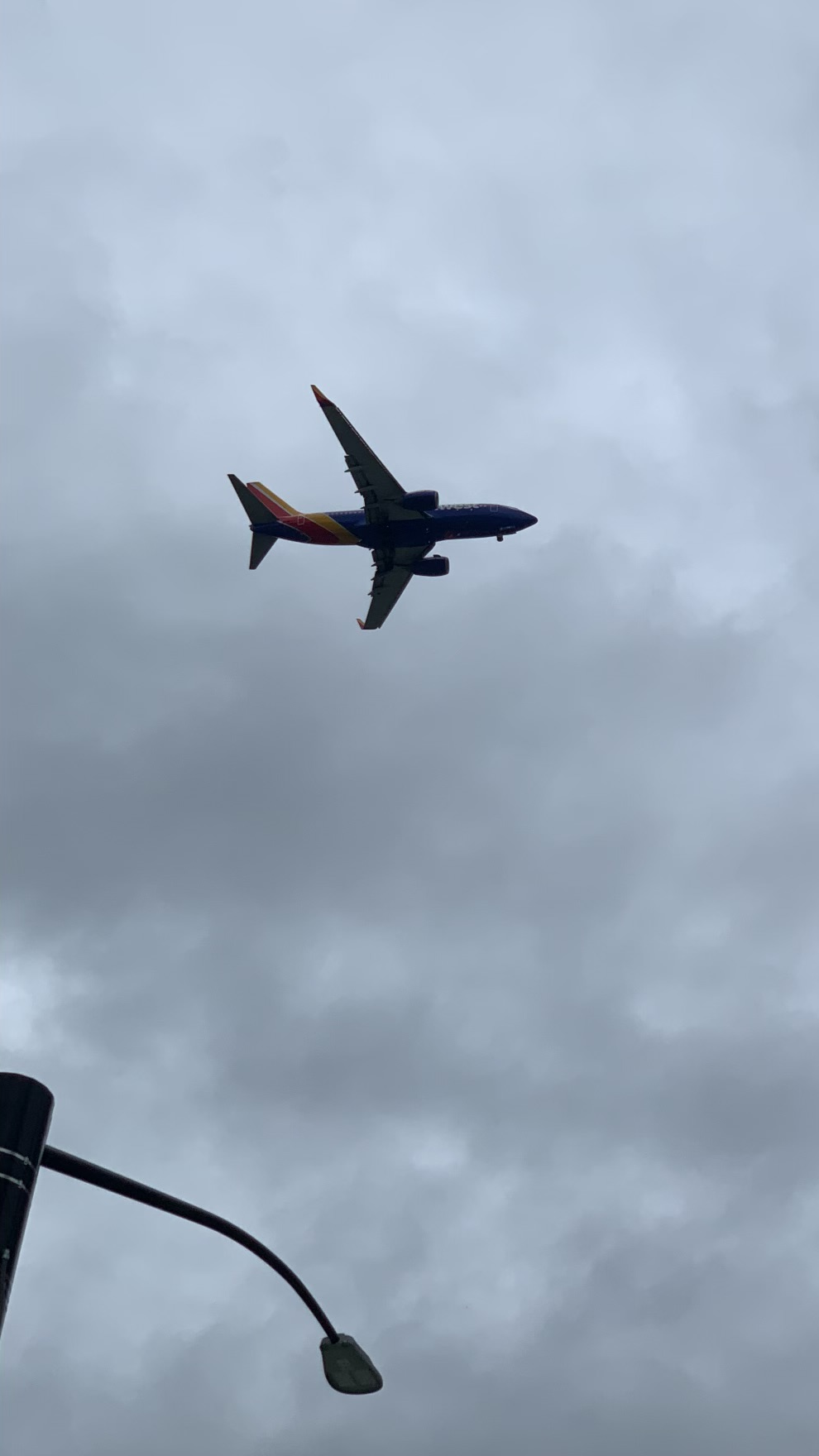
Southwest B737 on final approach to San Jose International Airport.

Southwest Airlines revealed in early 2026, that the airline would be moving forward with more of a hybrid model instead of its current point-to-point model while still looking to remain the most dominant point-to-point carrier in the country.. It has large operations in certain airports. An average of 80 percent of Southwest passengers are local passengers—only 20 percent are connecting passengers, a lower percentage than on most major airlines, where many passengers connect in hub cities. However, at Southwest's focus cities, the percentage of connecting passengers can reach 30 percent. As part of its effort to control costs, Southwest historically used secondary airports in cities where the primary airports have high costs, such as Chicago, Dallas/Fort Worth, Houston, and Miami. In the early 21st century, however, the airline has been expanding into primary airports as well.

In most cities where Southwest uses both a primary and secondary airport, the secondary airport is used more than the primary for flights (such as Oakland instead of San Francisco), with some exceptions such as the Los Angeles metro area, where Los Angeles International is a Southwest base and secondary airports (such as Burbank, Long Beach, Santa Ana and Ontario) have limited Southwest operations despite having a higher market share at the smaller airports. Until 2006, Southwest did not fly into Denver, which is now its most popular destination.

Unlike most other U.S. airlines, Southwest does not fly outside North America, and it does not fly to Canada due to its payment system not being set up for Canadian dollars.

Southwest began flying to Hawaii in 2019 and has announced it had begun service to Alaska on May 15, 2026.

=== International service ===
Southwest began planning international service when it acquired AirTran Airways, which already served international destinations. Southwest's first approach to international service came on April 19, 2012, when it signed a contract with the Amadeus IT Group to launch an international reservation system. This agreement gave the airline the capability to begin flying to destinations outside of the United States.

Southwest debuted the international reservation system on January 27, 2014, when its first international flights went on sale. This was followed by the first international flights which began on July 1, 2014, to Aruba (AUA), Montego Bay, Jamaica (MBJ) and Nassau, Bahamas (NAS).

Southwest built a 5-gate international terminal at William P. Hobby Airport that opened in 2015. Southwest also built a 5-gate international terminal in Fort Lauderdale that opened in 2017. In 2021, a 5-gate extension of terminal A at Baltimore/Washington International Airport opened. Southwest is the sole occupant of Terminal A and it invested significantly in the creation of the extension.

=== Busiest airports ===
As of Oct 01, 2026, there are 18 airports at which Southwest Airlines has over 80 daily departures.

Rank	City	Airport	Number of Flights	Number of Cities Served	Number of Gates
1	Las Vegas	Harry Reid International Airport	281	81	21
1	Denver	Denver International Airport	274	92	34
3	Chicago	Midway International Airport	223	83	37
4	Baltimore	Baltimore/Washington International Airport	218	79	26
5	Nashville	Nashville International Airport	215	87	24
6	Dallas	Dallas Love Field	206	75	19
7	Phoenix	Phoenix Sky Harbor International Airport	182	61	32
8	Houston	William P. Hobby Airport	175	69	20
9	Orlando	Orlando International Airport	174	61	20
10	St. Louis	St. Louis Lambert International Airport	137	62	17
11	Austin	Austin–Bergstrom International Airport	125	53	8
12	San Diego	San Diego International Airport	111	34	6
13	Sacramento	Sacramento International Airport	109	32	11
14	Oakland	Oakland San Francisco Bay Airport	108	24	11
15	Tampa	Tampa International Airport	106	43	15
16	San Jose	Norman Y. Mineta San Jose International Airport	100	26	18
17	Kansas City	Kansas City International Airport	80	45	15
18	Atlanta	Hartsfield–Jackson Atlanta International Airport	47	40	18

=== Current destinations ===
As of March 2026, Southwest Airlines flies to 119 destinations.

Country	City	Airport	Notes	Refs
Aruba	Oranjestad	Queen Beatrix International Airport		
Bahamas	Nassau	Lynden Pindling International Airport		
Belize	Belize City	Philip S. W. Goldson International Airport		
Cayman Islands	George Town	Owen Roberts International Airport		
Costa Rica	Liberia	Guanacaste Airport		
Costa Rica	San José	Juan Santamaría International Airport		
Cuba	Havana	José Martí International Airport		
Dominican Republic	Punta Cana	Punta Cana International Airport		
Jamaica	Montego Bay	Sangster International Airport		
Mexico	Cancún	Cancún International Airport		
Mexico	Puerto Vallarta	Licenciado Gustavo Díaz Ordaz International Airport		
Mexico	San José del Cabo	Los Cabos International Airport		
St. Maarten	Philipsburg	Princess Juliana International Airport		
Turks and Caicos Islands	Providenciales	Providenciales International Airport		
United States (Alabama)	Birmingham	Birmingham–Shuttlesworth International Airport		
United States (Alaska)	Anchorage	Ted Stevens Anchorage International Airport		
United States (Arizona)	Phoenix	Phoenix Sky Harbor International Airport	Base	
United States (Arizona)	Tucson	Tucson International Airport		
United States (Arkansas)	Little Rock	Clinton National Airport		
United States (California)	Burbank	Hollywood Burbank Airport		
United States (California)	Fresno	Fresno Yosemite International Airport		
United States (California)	Long Beach	Long Beach Airport		
United States (California)	Los Angeles	Los Angeles International Airport	Base	
United States (California)	Oakland	Oakland San Francisco Bay Airport	Base	
United States (California)	Ontario	Ontario International Airport		
United States (California)	Orange County/Santa Ana	John Wayne Airport		
United States (California)	Palm Springs	Palm Springs International Airport		
United States (California)	Sacramento	Sacramento International Airport		
United States (California)	San Diego	San Diego International Airport		
United States (California)	San Francisco	San Francisco International Airport		
United States (California)	San José	San Jose International Airport		
United States (California)	Santa Barbara	Santa Barbara Municipal Airport		
United States (California)	Sonoma County/Santa Rosa	Sonoma County Airport		
United States (Colorado)	Colorado Springs	Colorado Springs Airport		
United States (Colorado)	Denver	Denver International Airport	Base	
United States (Colorado)	Hayden/Steamboat Springs	Yampa Valley Regional Airport		
United States (Colorado)	Montrose	Montrose Regional Airport		
United States (Connecticut)	Hartford	Bradley International Airport		
United States (Florida)	Destin/Fort Walton Beach	Destin–Fort Walton Beach Airport		
United States (Florida)	Fort Lauderdale	Fort Lauderdale–Hollywood International Airport		
United States (Florida)	Fort Myers	Southwest Florida International Airport		
United States (Florida)	Jacksonville	Jacksonville International Airport		
United States (Florida)	Orlando	Orlando International Airport	Base	
United States (Florida)	West Palm Beach	President Donald J. Trump International Airport		
United States (Florida)	Panama City	Northwest Florida Beaches International Airport		
United States (Florida)	Pensacola	Pensacola International Airport		
United States (Florida)	Miami	Miami International Airport		
United States (Florida)	Sarasota	Sarasota–Bradenton International Airport		
United States (Florida)	Tampa	Tampa International Airport		
United States (Georgia)	Atlanta	Hartsfield–Jackson Atlanta International Airport	Base	
United States (Georgia)	Savannah	Savannah/Hilton Head International Airport		
United States (Hawaii)	Honolulu	Daniel K. Inouye International Airport		
United States (Hawaii)	Kahului	Kahului Airport		
United States (Hawaii)	Kailua–Kona	Kona International Airport		
United States (Hawaii)	Hilo	Hilo International Airport		
United States (Hawaii)	Lihue	Lihue Airport		
United States (Idaho)	Boise	Boise Airport		
United States (Illinois)	Chicago	Midway International Airport	Base	
United States (Indiana)	Indianapolis	Indianapolis International Airport		
United States (Iowa)	Des Moines	Des Moines International Airport		
United States (Kansas)	Wichita	Wichita Dwight D. Eisenhower National Airport		
United States (Kentucky)	Cincinnati/Covington	Cincinnati/Northern Kentucky International Airport		
United States (Kentucky)	Louisville	Louisville International Airport		
United States (Louisiana)	New Orleans	Louis Armstrong New Orleans International Airport		
United States (Maine)	Portland	Portland International Jetport		
United States (Maryland)	Baltimore	Baltimore/Washington International Airport	Base	
United States (Massachusetts)	Boston	Logan International Airport		
United States (Michigan)	Detroit	Detroit Metropolitan Wayne County Airport		
United States (Michigan)	Grand Rapids	Gerald R. Ford International Airport		
United States (Minnesota)	Minneapolis/Saint Paul	Minneapolis–Saint Paul International Airport		
United States (Mississippi)	Jackson	Jackson–Medgar Wiley Evers International Airport		
United States (Missouri)	Kansas City	Kansas City International Airport		
United States (Missouri)	St. Louis	St. Louis Lambert International Airport		
United States (Montana)	Bozeman	Bozeman Yellowstone International Airport		
United States (Nebraska)	Omaha	Eppley Airfield		
United States (Nevada)	Las Vegas	Harry Reid International Airport	Base	
United States (Nevada)	Reno/Tahoe	Reno–Tahoe International Airport		
United States (New Hampshire)	Manchester	Manchester–Boston Regional Airport		
United States (New Mexico)	Albuquerque	Albuquerque International Sunport		
United States (New York)	Albany	Albany International Airport		
United States (New York)	Buffalo	Buffalo Niagara International Airport		
United States (New York)	Long Island/Islip	Long Island MacArthur Airport		
United States (New York)	New York City	LaGuardia Airport		
United States (New York)	Rochester	Greater Rochester International Airport		
United States (North Carolina)	Charlotte	Charlotte Douglas International Airport		
United States (North Carolina)	Raleigh/Durham	Raleigh–Durham International Airport		
United States (Ohio)	Cleveland	Cleveland Hopkins International Airport		
United States (Ohio)	Columbus	John Glenn Columbus International Airport		
United States (Oklahoma)	Oklahoma City	OKC Will Rogers International Airport		
United States (Oklahoma)	Tulsa	Tulsa International Airport		
United States (Oregon)	Eugene	Eugene Airport		
United States (Oregon)	Portland	Portland International Airport		
United States (Pennsylvania)	Philadelphia	Philadelphia International Airport		
United States (Pennsylvania)	Pittsburgh	Pittsburgh International Airport		
United States (Puerto Rico)	San Juan	Luis Muñoz Marín International Airport		
United States (Rhode Island)	Providence	Rhode Island T. F. Green International Airport		
United States (South Carolina)	Charleston	Charleston International Airport		
United States (South Carolina)	Greenville/Spartanburg	Greenville–Spartanburg International Airport		
United States (South Carolina)	Myrtle Beach	Myrtle Beach International Airport		
United States (Tennessee)	Knoxville	McGhee Tyson Airport		
United States (Tennessee)	Memphis	Memphis International Airport		
United States (Tennessee)	Nashville	Nashville International Airport	Base	
United States (Texas)	Amarillo	Rick Husband Amarillo International Airport		
United States (Texas)	Austin	Austin–Bergstrom International Airport	Base	
United States (Texas)	Corpus Christi	Corpus Christi International Airport		
United States (Texas)	Dallas	Dallas Love Field	Base; Headquarters	
United States (Texas)	El Paso	El Paso International Airport		
United States (Texas)	Harlingen/South Padre Island	Valley International Airport		
United States (Texas)	Houston	William P. Hobby Airport	Base	
United States (Texas)	Lubbock	Lubbock Preston Smith International Airport		
United States (Texas)	Midland/Odessa	Midland International Airport		
United States (Texas)	San Antonio	San Antonio International Airport		
United States (Utah)	Salt Lake City	Salt Lake City International Airport		
United States (Virginia)	Norfolk	Norfolk International Airport		
United States (Virginia)	Richmond	Richmond International Airport		
United States (Virginia)	Washington, D.C. area	Ronald Reagan Washington National Airport		
United States (Virgin Islands)	St. Thomas	Cyril E. King Airport		
United States (Washington)	Seattle/Tacoma	Seattle–Tacoma International Airport		
United States (Washington)	Spokane	Spokane International Airport		
United States (Wisconsin)	Milwaukee	Milwaukee Mitchell International Airport		

=== Terminated destinations ===
Country (State/Province)	City	Airport	Begin	End	Refs
Cuba	Santa Clara	Abel Santamaría Airport	2016	2017	
Cuba	Varadero	Juan Gualberto Gómez Airport	2016	2017	
Mexico	Mexico City	Mexico City International Airport	2012 (AirTran)	2019	
Mexico	Cozumel	Cozumel International Airport	2019	2024	
United States (Colorado)	Denver	Stapleton International Airport	1983	1995 (Note: Operations ended when airport closed)	
United States (Florida)	Key West	Key West International Airport	2012	2014	
United States (Illinois)	Chicago	O'Hare International Airport	2021	2026	
United States (Michigan)	Detroit	Coleman A. Young International Airport	1988	1993	
United States (Michigan)	Flint	Bishop International Airport	2013	2018	
United States (Missouri)	Branson	Branson Airport	2013	2014	
United States (New Jersey)	Newark	Newark Liberty International Airport	2011	2019	
United States (New York)	Syracuse	Syracuse Hancock International Airport	2021	2024	
United States (Ohio)	Akron/Canton	Akron–Canton Airport	2012 (AirTran)	2017	
United States (Ohio)	Dayton	Dayton International Airport	2012 (AirTran)	2017	
United States (Texas)	Austin	Robert Mueller Municipal Airport	1977	1999	
United States (Texas)	Beaumont/Port Arthur	Jack Brooks Regional Airport	1979	1980	
United States (Texas)	Houston	George Bush Intercontinental Airport	1971; 1980; 2021	1972; 2005; 2024	
United States (Virginia)	Washington, D.C. area	Dulles International Airport	2006	2026	
United States (Washington)	Bellingham	Bellingham International Airport	2021	2024	
