= List of JetBlue destinations =

This is a list of destinations served or previously served by JetBlue as of August 2025. The American low-cost airline operates a fleet of Airbus aircraft throughout the United States, northern and central Latin America, the Caribbean, as well as Europe, with most of its operations within the eastern United States.

== Top domestic markets ==
Top domestic or territorial markets (January - December 2024)
| Rank | Airport | Passengers | Market share (%) |
|---|---|---|---|
| 1 | New York, New York | 5,570,000 | 18.71% |
| 2 | Boston, Massachusetts | 4,550,000 | 27.02% |
| 3 | Fort Lauderdale, Florida | 2,530,000 | 18.53% |
| 4 | Orlando, Florida | 2,370,000 | 9.84% |
| 5 | San Juan, Puerto Rico | 1,430,000 | 24.89% |
| | Other | 12,940,000 | 1.70% |

== Destinations ==
| Country (Subdivision) or Territory | Continent | City | Airport | Notes | Refs |
|---|---|---|---|---|---|
| Antigua and Barbuda | North America | St. John's | V. C. Bird International Airport | | |
| Aruba | North America | Oranjestad | Queen Beatrix International Airport | | |
| Bahamas | North America | Nassau | Lynden Pindling International Airport | | |
| Barbados | North America | Bridgetown | Grantley Adams International Airport | | |
| Belize | North America | Belize City | Philip S. W. Goldson International Airport | Terminated | |
| Bermuda | North America | Hamilton | L.F. Wade International Airport | | |
| Bonaire | North America | Kralendijk | Flamingo International Airport | Terminated | |
| Canada (British Columbia) | North America | Vancouver | Vancouver International Airport | | |
| Cayman Islands | North America | Grand Cayman | Owen Roberts International Airport | | |
| Colombia | South America | Barranquilla | Ernesto Cortissoz International Airport | | |
| Colombia | South America | Bogotá | El Dorado International Airport | Terminated | |
| Colombia | South America | Cali | Alfonso Bonilla Aragón International Airport | Begins October 15, 2026 | |
| Colombia | South America | Cartagena | Rafael Núñez International Airport | | |
| Colombia | South America | Medellín | José María Córdova International Airport | | |
| Costa Rica | North America | Liberia | Guanacaste Airport | | |
| Costa Rica | North America | San José | Juan Santamaría International Airport | | |
| Cuba | North America | Camagüey | Ignacio Agramonte International Airport | Terminated | |
| Cuba | North America | Havana | José Martí International Airport | Terminated | |
| Cuba | North America | Holguín | Frank País Airport | Terminated | |
| Cuba | North America | Santa Clara | Abel Santamaria Airport | Terminated | |
| Curaçao | North America | Willemstad | Hato International Airport | | |
| Dominican Republic | North America | La Romana | La Romana International Airport | Terminated | |
| Dominican Republic | North America | Puerto Plata | Gregorio Luperón International Airport | | |
| Dominican Republic | North America | Punta Cana | Punta Cana International Airport | | |
| Dominican Republic | North America | Samaná | Samaná El Catey International Airport | Terminated | |
| Dominican Republic | North America | Santiago de los Caballeros | Cibao International Airport | | |
| Dominican Republic | North America | Santo Domingo | Las Américas International Airport | | |
| Ecuador | South America | Guayaquil | José Joaquín de Olmedo International Airport | | |
| Ecuador | South America | Quito | Mariscal Sucre International Airport | Terminated | |
| France | Europe | Paris | Charles de Gaulle Airport | | |
| Grenada | North America | St. George's | Maurice Bishop International Airport | | |
| Guadeloupe | North America | Pointe-à-Pitre | Pointe-à-Pitre International Airport | Terminated | |
| Guatemala | North America | Guatemala City | La Aurora International Airport | | |
| Guyana | South America | Georgetown | Cheddi Jagan International Airport | | |
| Haiti | North America | Port-au-Prince | Toussaint Louverture International Airport | | |
| Honduras | North America | San Pedro Sula | Ramón Villeda Morales International Airport | | |
| Ireland | Europe | Dublin | Dublin Airport | Seasonal | |
| Italy | Europe | Milan | Milan Malpensa Airport | Seasonal | |
| Jamaica | North America | Kingston | Norman Manley International Airport | | |
| Jamaica | North America | Montego Bay | Sangster International Airport | | |
| Mexico | North America | Cancún | Cancún International Airport | | |
| Mexico | North America | Los Cabos | Los Cabos International Airport | | |
| Mexico | North America | Mexico City | Mexico City International Airport | Terminated | |
| Mexico | North America | Puerto Vallarta | Licenciado Gustavo Díaz Ordaz International Airport | Terminated | |
| Mexico | North America | Tulum | Tulum International Airport | Terminated | |
| Netherlands | Europe | Amsterdam | Amsterdam Airport Schiphol | | |
| Peru | South America | Lima | Jorge Chávez International Airport | Terminated | |
| Puerto Rico | North America | Aguadilla | Rafael Hernández Airport | | |
| Puerto Rico | North America | Ponce | Mercedita Airport | | |
| Puerto Rico | North America | San Juan | Luis Muñoz Marín International Airport | Focus city | |
| Saint Kitts and Nevis | North America | Basseterre | Robert L. Bradshaw International Airport | | |
| Saint Lucia | North America | Vieux Fort | Hewanorra International Airport | | |
| Saint Vincent and the Grenadines | North America | Kingstown | Argyle International Airport | | |
| Sint Maarten | North America | Philipsburg | Princess Juliana International Airport | | |
| Spain | Europe | Barcelona | Josep Tarradellas Barcelona–El Prat Airport | Seasonal | |
| Spain | Europe | Madrid | Madrid–Barajas Airport | Seasonal | |
| Trinidad and Tobago | North America | Port of Spain | Piarco International Airport | | |
| Turks and Caicos Islands | North America | Providenciales | Providenciales International Airport | | |
| United Kingdom | Europe | Edinburgh | Edinburgh Airport | Seasonal | |
| United Kingdom | Europe | London | Gatwick Airport | Seasonal | |
| United Kingdom | Europe | London | Heathrow Airport | | |
| United States (Alaska) | North America | Anchorage | Ted Stevens Anchorage International Airport | Terminated | |
| United States (Arizona) | North America | Phoenix | Phoenix Sky Harbor International Airport | | |
| United States (Arizona) | North America | Tucson | Tucson International Airport | Terminated | |
| United States (California) | North America | Burbank | Hollywood Burbank Airport | Seasonal | |
| United States (California) | North America | Long Beach | Long Beach Airport | Terminated | |
| United States (California) | North America | Los Angeles | Los Angeles International Airport | Focus city | |
| United States (California) | North America | Oakland | Oakland International Airport | Terminated | |
| United States (California) | North America | Ontario | Ontario International Airport | Seasonal | |
| United States (California) | North America | Palm Springs | Palm Springs International Airport | Terminated | |
| United States (California) | North America | Sacramento | Sacramento International Airport | Seasonal | |
| United States (California) | North America | San Diego | San Diego International Airport | | |
| United States (California) | North America | San Francisco | San Francisco International Airport | | |
| United States (California) | North America | San Jose | San Jose International Airport | Terminated | |
| United States (Colorado) | North America | Denver | Denver International Airport | | |
| United States (Colorado) | North America | Hayden/Steamboat Springs | Yampa Valley Regional Airport | Seasonal | |
| United States (Colorado) | North America | Montrose | Montrose Regional Airport | Terminated | |
| United States (Connecticut) | North America | Hartford | Bradley International Airport | | |
| United States (District of Columbia) | North America | Washington, D.C. | Dulles International Airport | Terminated | |
| United States (District of Columbia) | North America | Washington, D.C. | Ronald Reagan Washington National Airport | | |
| United States (Florida) | North America | Daytona Beach | Daytona Beach International Airport | | |
| United States (Florida) | North America | Fort Lauderdale | Fort Lauderdale–Hollywood International Airport | Focus city | |
| United States (Florida) | North America | Fort Myers | Southwest Florida International Airport | | |
| United States (Florida) | North America | Jacksonville | Jacksonville International Airport | | |
| United States (Florida) | North America | Key West | Key West International Airport | Seasonal | |
| United States (Florida) | North America | Miami | Miami International Airport | Terminated | |
| United States (Florida) | North America | Orlando | Orlando International Airport | Focus city | |
| United States (Florida) | North America | Sarasota | Sarasota–Bradenton International Airport | | |
| United States (Florida) | North America | Tallahassee | Tallahassee International Airport | Terminated | |
| United States (Florida) | North America | Tampa | Tampa International Airport | | |
| United States (Florida) | North America | Vero Beach | Vero Beach Regional Airport | | |
| United States (Florida) | North America | West Palm Beach | President Donald J. Trump International Airport | | |
| United States (Georgia) | North America | Atlanta | Hartsfield–Jackson Atlanta International Airport | | |
| United States (Georgia) | North America | Savannah | Savannah/Hilton Head International Airport | | |
| United States (Idaho) | North America | Boise | Boise Airport | Terminated | |
| United States (Illinois) | North America | Chicago | O'Hare International Airport | | |
| United States (Indiana) | North America | Indianapolis | Indianapolis International Airport | Begins November 2, 2026 | |
| United States (Louisiana) | North America | New Orleans | Louis Armstrong New Orleans International Airport | | |
| United States (Maine) | North America | Portland | Portland International Jetport | Seasonal | |
| United States (Maine) | North America | Presque Isle | Presque Isle International Airport | | |
| United States (Maryland) | North America | Baltimore | Baltimore/Washington International Airport | | |
| United States (Massachusetts) | North America | Boston | Logan International Airport | Focus city | |
| United States (Massachusetts) | North America | Hyannis | Barnstable Municipal Airport | Seasonal | |
| United States (Massachusetts) | North America | Martha's Vineyard | Martha's Vineyard Airport | Seasonal | |
| United States (Massachusetts) | North America | Nantucket | Nantucket Memorial Airport | Seasonal | |
| United States (Massachusetts) | North America | Worcester | Worcester Regional Airport | | |
| United States (Michigan) | North America | Detroit | Detroit Metropolitan Wayne County Airport | | |
| United States (Michigan) | North America | Traverse City | Cherry Capital Airport | Seasonal | |
| United States (Minnesota) | North America | Minneapolis/Saint Paul | Minneapolis–Saint Paul International Airport | Terminated | |
| United States (Missouri) | North America | Kansas City | Kansas City International Airport | Terminated | |
| United States (Montana) | North America | Bozeman | Bozeman Yellowstone International Airport | Seasonal | |
| United States (Montana) | North America | Kalispell | Glacier Park International Airport | Terminated | |
| United States (Nevada) | North America | Las Vegas | Harry Reid International Airport | | |
| United States (Nevada) | North America | Reno/Tahoe | Reno–Tahoe International Airport | Seasonal | |
| United States (New Hampshire) | North America | Manchester | Manchester–Boston Regional Airport | | |
| United States (New Jersey) | North America | Newark | Newark Liberty International Airport | Focus city | |
| United States (New Mexico) | North America | Albuquerque | Albuquerque International Sunport | Seasonal | |
| United States (New York) | North America | Albany | Albany International Airport | | |
| United States (New York) | North America | Buffalo | Buffalo Niagara International Airport | | |
| United States (New York) | North America | Long Island/Islip | Long Island MacArthur Airport | Focus city | |
| United States (New York) | North America | New York City | John F. Kennedy International Airport | Hub | |
| United States (New York) | North America | New York City | LaGuardia Airport | Focus city | |
| United States (New York) | North America | Newburgh | Stewart International Airport | Terminated | |
| United States (New York) | North America | Rochester | Greater Rochester International Airport | | |
| United States (New York) | North America | Syracuse | Syracuse Hancock International Airport | | |
| United States (New York) | North America | White Plains | Westchester County Airport | Focus city | |
| United States (North Carolina) | North America | Asheville | Asheville Regional Airport | Terminated | |
| United States (North Carolina) | North America | Charlotte | Charlotte Douglas International Airport | | |
| United States (North Carolina) | North America | Raleigh/Durham | Raleigh–Durham International Airport | | |
| United States (North Carolina) | North America | Wilmington | Wilmington International Airport | Seasonal | |
| United States (Ohio) | North America | Cleveland | Cleveland Hopkins International Airport | | |
| United States (Ohio) | North America | Columbus | John Glenn Columbus International Airport | Resumes November 2, 2026 | |
| United States (Oregon) | North America | Portland | Portland International Airport | Seasonal | |
| United States (Pennsylvania) | North America | Philadelphia | Philadelphia International Airport | | |
| United States (Pennsylvania) | North America | Pittsburgh | Pittsburgh International Airport | | |
| United States (Rhode Island) | North America | Providence | Rhode Island T. F. Green International Airport | | |
| United States (South Carolina) | North America | Charleston | Charleston International Airport | | |
| United States (Tennessee) | North America | Nashville | Nashville International Airport | | |
| United States (Texas) | North America | Austin | Austin–Bergstrom International Airport | | |
| United States (Texas) | North America | Dallas/Fort Worth | Dallas Fort Worth International Airport | | |
| United States (Texas) | North America | Houston | George Bush Intercontinental Airport | | |
| United States (Texas) | North America | Houston | William P. Hobby Airport | Terminated | |
| United States (Texas) | North America | San Antonio | San Antonio International Airport | Terminated | |
| United States (Utah) | North America | Salt Lake City | Salt Lake City International Airport | | |
| United States (Vermont) | North America | Burlington | Burlington International Airport | Terminated | |
| United States (Virginia) | North America | Norfolk | Norfolk International Airport | Seasonal | |
| United States (Virginia) | North America | Richmond | Richmond International Airport | | |
| United States (Washington) | North America | Seattle/Tacoma | Seattle–Tacoma International Airport | Seasonal | |
| United States (Wisconsin) | North America | Milwaukee | Milwaukee Mitchell International Airport | Seasonal | |
| United States Virgin Islands | North America | St. Croix | Henry E. Rohlsen Airport | | |
| United States Virgin Islands | North America | St. Thomas | Cyril E. King Airport | | |
