= List of EasyJet destinations =

This is a list of destinations served and formerly served by easyJet as of October 2024, the operations of which collectively include those of easyJet Europe, easyJet Switzerland, and easyJet UK.

== List ==
| Country or Territory | Town | Airport | Notes | Refs |
|---|---|---|---|---|
| Albania | Tirana | Tirana International Airport Nënë Tereza | | |
| Austria | Graz | Graz Airport | Terminated | |
| Austria | Innsbruck | Innsbruck Airport | | |
| Austria | Klagenfurt | Klagenfurt Airport | Terminated | |
| Austria | Salzburg | Salzburg Airport | Seasonal | |
| Austria | Vienna | Vienna International Airport | | |
| Belgium | Brussels | Brussels Airport | | |
| Bulgaria | Burgas | Burgas Airport | Seasonal | |
| Bulgaria | Sofia | Vasil Levski Sofia Airport | | |
| Bulgaria | Varna | Varna Airport | Terminated | |
| Cape Verde | Boa Vista | Aristides Pereira International Airport | | |
| Cape Verde | Praia | Nelson Mandela International Airport | | |
| Cape Verde | Sal | Amílcar Cabral International Airport | | |
| Cape Verde | São Vicente | Cesária Évora Airport | | |
| Croatia | Dubrovnik | Dubrovnik Airport | Seasonal | |
| Croatia | Pula | Pula Airport | Seasonal | |
| Croatia | Rijeka | Rijeka Airport | Terminated | |
| Croatia | Split | Split Airport | Seasonal | |
| Croatia | Zadar | Zadar Airport | Seasonal | |
| Cyprus | Larnaca | Larnaca International Airport | | |
| Cyprus | Paphos | Paphos International Airport | | |
| Czech Republic | Prague | Václav Havel Airport Prague | | |
| Denmark | Aarhus | Aarhus Airport | Terminated | |
| Denmark | Copenhagen | Copenhagen Airport | | |
| Egypt | Giza | Sphinx International Airport | Seasonal | |
| Egypt | Hurghada | Hurghada International Airport | | |
| Egypt | Luxor | Luxor International Airport | | |
| Egypt | Marsa Alam | Marsa Alam International Airport | | |
| Egypt | Sharm El Sheikh | Sharm El Sheikh International Airport | | |
| Estonia | Tallinn | Tallinn Airport | Terminated | |
| Finland | Helsinki | Helsinki Airport | Terminated | |
| Finland | Kittilä | Kittilä Airport | Seasonal | |
| Finland | Rovaniemi | Rovaniemi Airport | Seasonal | |
| France | Ajaccio | Ajaccio Napoleon Bonaparte Airport | Seasonal | |
| France | Bastia | Bastia – Poretta Airport | Seasonal | |
| France | Beauvais | Paris Beauvais Airport | Terminated | |
| France | Biarritz | Biarritz Pays Basque Airport | | |
| France | Bordeaux | Bordeaux–Mérignac Airport | Base | |
| France | Brest | Brest Bretagne Airport | Seasonal | |
| France | Calvi | Calvi - Sainte-Catherine Airport | Seasonal | |
| France | Figari | Figari Sud-Corse Airport | Seasonal | |
| France | Grenoble | Grenoble–Isère Airport | Seasonal | |
| France | La Rochelle | La Rochelle – Île de Ré Airport | Seasonal | |
| France | Lille | Lille Airport | | |
| France | Limoges | Limoges – Bellegarde Airport | Terminated | |
| France | Lyon | Lyon–Saint-Exupéry Airport | Base | |
| France | Marseille | Marseille Provence Airport | | |
| France | Montpellier | Montpellier–Méditerranée Airport | | |
| France | Nantes | Nantes Atlantique Airport | Base | |
| France | Nice | Nice Côte d'Azur Airport | Base | |
| France | Paris | Charles de Gaulle Airport | Base | |
| France | Paris | Orly Airport | Base | |
| France | Rennes | Rennes Saint-Jacques Airport | | |
| France | Strasbourg | Strasbourg-Entzheim Airport | | |
| France | Toulon | Toulon–Hyères Airport | | |
| France | Toulouse | Toulouse–Blagnac Airport | Base | |
| Georgia | Tbilisi | Shota Rustaveli Tbilisi International Airport | | |
| Germany | Berlin | Berlin Brandenburg Airport | Base | |
| Germany | Berlin | Berlin Schönefeld Airport | Airport Closed | |
| Germany | Berlin | Berlin Tegel Airport | Airport Closed | |
| Germany | Cologne/Bonn | Cologne/Bonn Airport | Terminated | |
| Germany | Dortmund | Dortmund Airport | Terminated | |
| Germany | Dresden | Dresden Airport | Terminated | |
| Germany | Düsseldorf | Düsseldorf Airport | | |
| Germany | Frankfurt | Frankfurt Airport | | |
| Germany | Friedrichshafen | Friedrichshafen Airport | Seasonal | |
| Germany | Hamburg | Hamburg Airport | | |
| Germany | Munich | Munich Airport | | |
| Germany | Stuttgart | Stuttgart Airport | Terminated | |
| Germany | Sylt | Sylt Airport | Terminated | |
| Gibraltar | Gibraltar | Gibraltar International Airport | | |
| Greece | Athens | Athens International Airport | | |
| Greece | Chania | Chania International Airport | Seasonal | |
| Greece | Corfu | Corfu International Airport | Seasonal | |
| Greece | Heraklion | Heraklion International Airport | Seasonal | |
| Greece | Kalamata | Kalamata International Airport | Seasonal | |
| Greece | Kefalonia | Kefalonia International Airport | Seasonal | |
| Greece | Kos | Kos International Airport | Seasonal | |
| Greece | Mykonos Island | Mykonos Airport | Seasonal | |
| Greece | Preveza/Lefkada | Aktion National Airport | Seasonal | |
| Greece | Rhodes | Rhodes International Airport | Seasonal | |
| Greece | Santorini | Santorini (Thira) International Airport | Seasonal | |
| Greece | Skiathos | Skiathos International Airport | Seasonal | |
| Greece | Thessaloniki | Thessaloniki Airport | | |
| Greece | Volos | Nea Anchialos National Airport | Terminated | |
| Greece | Zakynthos | Zakynthos International Airport | Seasonal | |
| Hungary | Budapest | Budapest Ferenc Liszt International Airport | | |
| Iceland | Akureyri | Akureyri Airport | Seasonal | |
| Iceland | Reykjavík | Keflavík International Airport | | |
| Isle of Man | Ronaldsway | Isle of Man Airport | | |
| Israel | Tel Aviv | David Ben Gurion Airport | | |
| Italy | Alghero | Alghero-Fertilia Airport | Terminated | |
| Italy | Ancona | Marche Airport | Terminated | |
| Italy | Bari | Bari Karol Wojtyła Airport | | |
| Italy | Bergamo | Milan Bergamo Airport | Terminated | |
| Italy | Bologna | Bologna Guglielmo Marconi Airport | Terminated | |
| Italy | Brindisi | Brindisi – Salento Airport | | |
| Italy | Cagliari | Cagliari Elmas Airport | Terminated | |
| Italy | Catania | Catania–Fontanarossa Airport | | |
| Italy | Comiso | Comiso Airport | Terminated | |
| Italy | Lamezia Terme | Lamezia Terme Airport | | |
| Italy | Lampedusa | Lampedusa Airport | Seasonal | |
| Italy | Milan | Milan Linate Airport | Base | |
| Italy | Milan | Milan Malpensa Airport | Base | |
| Italy | Naples | Naples International Airport | Base | |
| Italy | Olbia | Olbia Costa Smeralda Airport | | |
| Italy | Palermo | Falcone–Borsellino Airport | | |
| Italy | Pisa | Pisa International Airport | | |
| Italy | Rome | Leonardo da Vinci–Fiumicino Airport | Base | |
| Italy | Salerno | Salerno Costa d'Amalfi Airport | | |
| Italy | Turin | Turin Airport | | |
| Italy | Venice | Venice Marco Polo Airport | | |
| Italy | Verona | Verona Villafranca Airport | | |
| Jersey | Jersey | Jersey Airport | | |
| Jordan | Amman | Queen Alia International Airport | Terminated | |
| Jordan | Aqaba | King Hussein International Airport | Terminated | |
| Kosovo | Pristina | Pristina International Airport Adem Jashari | | |
| Luxembourg | Luxembourg City | Luxembourg Airport | | |
| Malta | Malta | Malta International Airport | | |
| Montenegro | Tivat | Tivat Airport | Seasonal | |
| Morocco | Agadir | Agadir–Al Massira Airport | | |
| Morocco | Essaouira | Essaouira-Mogador Airport | | |
| Morocco | Marrakesh | Marrakesh Menara Airport | | |
| Morocco | Tangier | Tangier Ibn Battouta Airport | Terminated | |
| Netherlands | Amsterdam | Amsterdam Airport Schiphol | Base | |
| North Macedonia | Skopje | Skopje International Airport | | |
| Norway | Tromsø | Tromsø Airport | | |
| Norway | Oslo | Oslo Airport, Gardermoen | | |
| Poland | Kraków | Kraków John Paul II International Airport | | |
| Portugal | Faro | Faro Airport | Base | |
| Portugal | Funchal | Madeira Airport | | |
| Portugal | Lisbon | Lisbon Airport | Base | |
| Portugal | Ponta Delgada | João Paulo II Airport | Terminated | |
| Portugal | Porto | Porto Airport | Base | |
| Portugal | Porto Santo | Porto Santo Airport | | |
| Romania | Bucharest | Henri Coandă International Airport | Terminated | |
| Russia | Moscow | Moscow Domodedovo Airport | Terminated | |
| Serbia | Belgrade | Belgrade Nikola Tesla Airport | | |
| Slovakia | Bratislava | M.R. Štefánik Airport | Terminated | |
| Slovenia | Ljubljana | Ljubljana Jože Pučnik Airport | | |
| Spain | Alicante | Alicante–Elche Airport | Base | |
| Spain | Almería | Almería Airport | | |
| Spain | Barcelona | Josep Tarradellas Barcelona–El Prat Airport | Base | |
| Spain | Bilbao | Bilbao Airport | | |
| Spain | Fuerteventura | Fuerteventura Airport | | |
| Spain | Granada | Federico García Lorca Airport | Terminated | |
| Spain | Ibiza | Ibiza Airport | Seasonal | |
| Spain | La Palma | La Palma Airport | | |
| Spain | Lanzarote | Lanzarote Airport | | |
| Spain | Las Palmas | Gran Canaria Airport | | |
| Spain | Menorca | Menorca Airport | | |
| Spain | Madrid | Madrid–Barajas Airport | | |
| Spain | Málaga | Málaga Airport | Base | |
| Spain | Murcia | Murcia–San Javier Airport | Terminated | |
| Spain | Murcia | Región de Murcia International Airport | | |
| Spain | Oviedo | Asturias Airport | Terminated | |
| Spain | Palma de Mallorca | Palma de Mallorca Airport | Base | |
| Spain | Reus | Reus Airport | | |
| Spain | Santiago de Compostela | Santiago de Compostela Airport | | |
| Spain | Seville | Sevilla Airport | | |
| Spain | Tenerife | Tenerife South Airport | | |
| Spain | Valencia | Valencia Airport | | |
| Sweden | Gothenburg | Göteborg Landvetter Airport | Terminated | |
| Sweden | Östersund | Åre Östersund Airport | Terminated | |
| Sweden | Sälen | Sälen/Scandinavian Mountains Airport | | |
| Sweden | Stockholm | Stockholm Arlanda Airport | | |
| Switzerland | Geneva | Geneva Airport | Base | |
| Switzerland | Zürich | Zürich Airport | | |
| Switzerland; France; Germany | Basel; Mulhouse; Freiburg | EuroAirport Basel Mulhouse Freiburg | Base | |
| Tunisia | Djerba | Djerba–Zarzis International Airport | | |
| Tunisia | Enfidha | Enfidha–Hammamet International Airport | | |
| Tunisia | Monastir | Monastir Habib Bourguiba International Airport | Terminated | |
| Turkey | Antalya | Antalya Airport | | |
| Turkey | Bodrum; Milas | Milas–Bodrum Airport | Seasonal | |
| Turkey | Dalaman | Dalaman Airport | | |
| Turkey | Istanbul | Istanbul Airport | | |
| Turkey | Istanbul | Istanbul Sabiha Gökçen International Airport | Terminated | |
| Turkey | İzmir | İzmir Adnan Menderes Airport | Seasonal | |
| United Kingdom | Aberdeen | Aberdeen Airport | | |
| United Kingdom | Belfast | Belfast City Airport | | |
| United Kingdom | Belfast | Belfast International Airport | Base | |
| United Kingdom | Birmingham | Birmingham Airport | Base | |
| United Kingdom | Bournemouth | Bournemouth Airport | Seasonal | |
| United Kingdom | Bristol | Bristol Airport | Base | |
| United Kingdom | Derry | City of Derry Airport | | |
| United Kingdom | Doncaster/Sheffield | Doncaster Sheffield Airport | Airport Closed | |
| United Kingdom | East Midlands | East Midlands Airport | Terminated | |
| United Kingdom | Edinburgh | Edinburgh Airport | Base | |
| United Kingdom | Glasgow | Glasgow Airport | Base | |
| United Kingdom | Inverness | Inverness Airport | | |
| United Kingdom | Leeds/Bradford | Leeds Bradford Airport | (all end 5 January 2027) | |
| United Kingdom | Liverpool | Liverpool John Lennon Airport | Base | |
| United Kingdom | London | Gatwick Airport | Largest Base | |
| United Kingdom | London | London Southend Airport | Base | |
| United Kingdom | London | London Stansted Airport | | |
| United Kingdom | London | Luton Airport | Headquarters | |
| United Kingdom | Manchester | Manchester Airport | Base | |
| United Kingdom | Newcastle upon Tyne | Newcastle Airport | Base | |
| United Kingdom | Newquay | Newquay Airport | Seasonal | |
| United Kingdom | Southampton | Southampton Airport | | |

== Top airports by destinations ==
Top airports by destinations in 2020
| Airport | IATA | Destinations |
|---|---|---|
| London–Gatwick | LGW | 117 |
| Geneva | GVA | 85 |
| Manchester | MAN | 74 |
| Bristol | BRS | 72 |
| Basel | BSL | 66 |
| London–Luton | LTN | 66 |
| Milan–Malpensa | MXP | 63 |
| Berlin | BER | 62 |
| Amsterdam | AMS | 52 |
| Lyon | LYS | 48 |
| Paris–Charles de Gaulle | CDG | 47 |
| Venice | VCE | 45 |
| Nice | NCE | 42 |
| Edinburgh | EDI | 42 |
| Belfast–International | BFS | 37 |
| Naples | NAP | 36 |
| Glasgow | GLA | 30 |
| Paris–Orly | ORY | 28 |
| Palma de Mallorca | PMI | 26 |
