= List of Emirates destinations =

As of February 2025, Emirates operates flights to 133 destinations in 85 countries across six continents from its hub in Dubai. It has a particularly strong presence in the South and Southeast Asian region, which together connect Dubai with more international destinations in the region than any other Middle Eastern airline. The countries with the largest number of destinations served by Emirates are the United States with 12 (13 airports), India with 10, the United Kingdom with six (eight airports), Pakistan with six, Australia and Saudi Arabia with five, and Germany and Italy with four.

This is a list of destinations which Emirates flies to as of June 2023; the list includes the country, city, and airport names. Additionally, there are labels for airports that are the airline's hub, future cities, and former destinations that have been discontinued. Doha, Qatar is one of the discontinued destinations as a result of the Qatar diplomatic crisis. Although the crisis was resolved in 2021, Emirates have not resumed their flights to Doha as Qatar Airways is the one flying to Dubai from Doha.

== List ==
Country/territory	City	Airport	Notes	Refs
Afghanistan	Kabul	Kabul International Airport	Terminated	
Algeria	Algiers	Houari Boumediene Airport	Ends 3 February 2027	
Angola	Luanda	Dr. António Agostinho Neto International Airport		
Angola	Luanda	Quatro de Fevereiro Airport	Airport closed	
Argentina	Buenos Aires	Ministro Pistarini International Airport		
Australia	Adelaide	Adelaide Airport		
Australia	Brisbane	Brisbane Airport		
Australia	Melbourne	Melbourne Airport		
Australia	Perth	Perth Airport		
Australia	Sydney	Sydney Airport		
Austria	Vienna	Vienna International Airport		
Azerbaijan	Baku	Heydar Aliyev International Airport	Terminated	
Bahrain	Manama	Bahrain International Airport		
Bangladesh	Dhaka	Hazrat Shahjalal International Airport		
Belgium	Brussels	Brussels Airport		
Brazil	Rio de Janeiro	Rio de Janeiro/Galeão International Airport		
Brazil	São Paulo	São Paulo/Guarulhos International Airport		
Cambodia	Phnom Penh	Techo International Airport		
Cambodia	Siem Reap	Siem Reap–Angkor International Airport		
Canada	Montreal	Montréal–Trudeau International Airport		
Canada	Toronto	Toronto Pearson International Airport		
Chile	Santiago	Arturo Merino Benítez International Airport	Terminated	
China	Beijing	Beijing Capital International Airport		
China	Guangzhou	Guangzhou Baiyun International Airport		
China	Hangzhou	Hangzhou Xiaoshan International Airport		
China	Shanghai	Shanghai Pudong International Airport		
China	Shenzhen	Shenzhen Bao'an International Airport		
China	Yinchuan	Yinchuan Hedong International Airport	Terminated	
China	Zhengzhou	Zhengzhou Xinzheng International Airport	Terminated	
Colombia	Bogotá	El Dorado International Airport		
Comoros	Moroni	Prince Said Ibrahim International Airport	Terminated	
Croatia	Zagreb	Zagreb Airport	Terminated	
Cyprus	Larnaca	Larnaca International Airport		
Czech Republic	Prague	Václav Havel Airport Prague		
Democratic Republic of Congo	Kinshasa	N'djili Airport	Begins 3 February 2027	
Denmark	Copenhagen	Copenhagen Airport		
Egypt	Alexandria	Borg El Arab International Airport	Terminated	
Egypt	Cairo	Cairo International Airport		
Ethiopia	Addis Ababa	Addis Ababa Bole International Airport		
Finland	Helsinki	Helsinki Airport		
France	Lyon	Lyon–Saint-Exupéry Airport		
France	Nice	Nice Côte d'Azur Airport		
France	Paris	Charles de Gaulle Airport		
Germany	Düsseldorf	Düsseldorf Airport		
Germany	Frankfurt	Frankfurt Airport		
Germany	Hamburg	Hamburg Airport		
Germany	Munich	Munich Airport		
Ghana	Accra	Accra International Airport		
Greece	Athens	Athens International Airport		
Guinea	Conakry	Conakry International Airport		
Hong Kong	Hong Kong	Hong Kong International Airport		
Hong Kong	Hong Kong	Kai Tak Airport	Airport closed	
Hungary	Budapest	Budapest Ferenc Liszt International Airport		
India	Ahmedabad	Ahmedabad Airport		
India	Bengaluru	Kempegowda International Airport		
India	Chennai	Chennai International Airport		
India	Delhi	Indira Gandhi International Airport		
India	Hyderabad	Rajiv Gandhi International Airport		
India	Kochi	Cochin International Airport		
India	Kolkata	Netaji Subhas Chandra Bose International Airport		
India	Kozhikode	Calicut International Airport	Terminated	
India	Mumbai	Chhatrapati Shivaji Maharaj International Airport		
India	Thiruvananthapuram	Thiruvananthapuram International Airport		
Indonesia	Denpasar	Ngurah Rai International Airport		
Indonesia	Jakarta	Soekarno–Hatta International Airport		
Iran	Bandar Abbas	Bandar Abbas International Airport	Terminated	
Iran	Mashhad	Mashhad International Airport	Terminated	
Iran	Tehran	Imam Khomeini International Airport	Terminated	
Iraq	Baghdad	Baghdad International Airport		
Iraq	Basra	Basra International Airport		
Iraq	Erbil	Erbil International Airport	Terminated	
Ireland	Dublin	Dublin Airport		
Israel	Tel Aviv	Ben Gurion International Airport	Terminated	
Italy	Bologna	Bologna Guglielmo Marconi Airport		
Italy	Milan	Milan Malpensa Airport		
Italy	Rome	Rome Fiumicino Airport		
Italy	Venice	Venice Marco Polo Airport		
Ivory Coast	Abidjan	Félix-Houphouët-Boigny International Airport		
Japan	Nagoya	Chubu Centrair International Airport	Terminated	
Japan	Osaka	Kansai International Airport		
Japan	Tokyo	Haneda Airport		
Japan	Tokyo	Narita International Airport		
Jordan	Amman	Queen Alia International Airport		
Kenya	Nairobi	Jomo Kenyatta International Airport		
Kuwait	Kuwait City	Kuwait International Airport		
Lebanon	Beirut	Beirut–Rafic Hariri International Airport		
Libya	Tripoli	Tripoli International Airport	Airport closed	
Madagascar	Antananarivo	Ivato International Airport		
Malaysia	Kuala Lumpur	Kuala Lumpur International Airport		
Maldives	Malé	Velana International Airport		
Malta	Valletta	Malta International Airport		
Mauritius	Port Louis	Sir Seewoosagur Ramgoolam International Airport		
Mexico	Mexico City	Mexico City International Airport		
Morocco	Casablanca	Mohammed V International Airport		
Myanmar	Yangon	Yangon International Airport	Terminated	
Netherlands	Amsterdam	Amsterdam Airport Schiphol		
New Zealand	Auckland	Auckland Airport		
New Zealand	Christchurch	Christchurch Airport		
Nigeria	Abuja	Nnamdi Azikiwe International Airport	Terminated	
Nigeria	Lagos	Murtala Muhammed International Airport		
Norway	Oslo	Oslo Airport, Gardermoen		
Oman	Muscat	Muscat International Airport		
Pakistan	Islamabad	Islamabad International Airport		
Pakistan	Karachi	Jinnah International Airport		
Pakistan	Lahore	Allama Iqbal International Airport		
Pakistan	Multan	Multan International Airport	Terminated	
Pakistan	Peshawar	Bacha Khan International Airport		
Pakistan	Sialkot	Sialkot International Airport		
Philippines	Cebu	Mactan–Cebu International Airport		
Philippines	Clark	Clark International Airport		
Philippines	Manila	Ninoy Aquino International Airport		
Poland	Warsaw	Warsaw Chopin Airport		
Portugal	Lisbon	Lisbon Airport		
Portugal	Porto	Porto Airport	Terminated	
Qatar	Doha	Hamad International Airport	Terminated	
Russia	Moscow	Domodedovo International Airport		
Russia	Saint Petersburg	Pulkovo Airport		
Saudi Arabia	Dammam	King Fahd International Airport		
Saudi Arabia	Dhahran	Dhahran International Airport	Airport closed	
Saudi Arabia	Jeddah	King Abdulaziz International Airport		
Saudi Arabia	Medina	Prince Mohammad bin Abdulaziz International Airport		
Saudi Arabia	Riyadh	King Khalid International Airport		
Senegal	Dakar	Blaise Diagne International Airport		
Senegal	Dakar	Léopold Sédar Senghor International Airport	Terminated	
Seychelles	Mahé	Seychelles International Airport		
Singapore	Singapore	Changi Airport		
South Africa	Cape Town	Cape Town International Airport		
South Africa	Durban	King Shaka International Airport		
South Africa	Johannesburg	O. R. Tambo International Airport		
South Korea	Seoul	Incheon International Airport		
Spain	Barcelona	Josep Tarradellas Barcelona–El Prat Airport		
Spain	Madrid	Madrid–Barajas Airport		
Sri Lanka	Colombo	Bandaranaike International Airport		
Sudan	Khartoum	Khartoum International Airport	Terminated	
Sweden	Stockholm	Stockholm Arlanda Airport		
Switzerland	Geneva	Geneva Airport		
Switzerland	Zurich	Zurich Airport		
Syria	Damascus	Damascus International Airport	Terminated	
Taiwan	Taipei	Taoyuan International Airport		
Tanzania	Dar es Salaam	Julius Nyerere International Airport		
Thailand	Bangkok	Don Mueang International Airport	Terminated	
Thailand	Bangkok	Suvarnabhumi Airport		
Thailand	Chiang Mai	Chiang Mai International Airport	Terminated	
Thailand	Phuket	Phuket International Airport		
Tunisia	Tunis	Tunis–Carthage International Airport		
Turkey	Istanbul	Atatürk Airport	Airport closed	
Turkey	Istanbul	Istanbul Airport		
Turkey	Istanbul	Sabiha Gökçen International Airport	Terminated	
Uganda	Entebbe	Entebbe International Airport		
Ukraine	Kyiv	Boryspil International Airport	Terminated	
United Arab Emirates	Abu Dhabi	Abu Dhabi International Airport	Terminated	
United Arab Emirates	Dubai	Dubai International Airport	Hub	
United Kingdom	Birmingham	Birmingham Airport		
United Kingdom	Edinburgh	Edinburgh Airport		
United Kingdom	Glasgow	Glasgow Airport		
United Kingdom	London	Gatwick Airport		
United Kingdom	London	Heathrow Airport		
United Kingdom	London	London Stansted Airport		
United Kingdom	Manchester	Manchester Airport		
United Kingdom	Newcastle	Newcastle International Airport		
United States	Boston	Logan International Airport		
United States	Chicago	O'Hare International Airport		
United States	Dallas/Fort Worth	Dallas Fort Worth International Airport		
United States	Fort Lauderdale	Fort Lauderdale–Hollywood International Airport	Terminated	
United States	Houston	George Bush Intercontinental Airport		
United States	Los Angeles	Los Angeles International Airport		
United States	Miami	Miami International Airport		
United States	Newark	Newark Liberty International Airport		
United States	New York City	John F. Kennedy International Airport		
United States	Orlando	Orlando International Airport		
United States	San Francisco	San Francisco International Airport		
United States	Seattle	Seattle–Tacoma International Airport		
United States	Washington, D.C.	Dulles International Airport		
Vietnam	Da Nang	Da Nang International Airport		
Vietnam	Hanoi	Noi Bai International Airport		
Vietnam	Ho Chi Minh City	Tan Son Nhat International Airport		
Yemen	Sanaa	Sanaa International Airport	Terminated	
Zambia	Lusaka	Kenneth Kaunda International Airport		
Zimbabwe	Harare	Robert Gabriel Mugabe International Airport		
