= List of Qatar Airways destinations =

Qatar Airways is the flag carrier of Qatar, and operates flights from its home of Doha Hamad International Airport to more than 90 countries on every inhabited continent.

== List ==
Country	City	Airport	Notes	Refs
Algeria	Algiers	Houari Boumediene Airport	Passenger	
Angola	Luanda	Dr. António Agostinho Neto International Airport	Passenger	
Angola	Luanda	Quatro de Fevereiro Airport	Airport closed	
Argentina	Buenos Aires	Ministro Pistarini International Airport	Cargo	
Armenia	Yerevan	Zvartnots International Airport	Passenger	
Australia	Adelaide	Adelaide Airport	Passenger	
Australia	Brisbane	Brisbane Airport	Passenger	
Australia	Canberra	Canberra Airport	Passenger	
Australia	Melbourne	Melbourne Airport	Passenger	
Australia	Perth	Perth Airport	Passenger	
Australia	Sydney	Sydney Airport	Passenger	
Australia	Sydney	Western Sydney Airport	Begins 15 December 2027	
Austria	Vienna	Vienna International Airport	Passenger	
Azerbaijan	Baku	Heydar Aliyev International Airport	Passenger	
Bahrain	Manama	Bahrain International Airport	Passenger + cargo	
Bangladesh	Dhaka	Hazrat Shahjalal International Airport	Passenger + cargo	
Belgium	Brussels	Brussels Airport	Passenger + cargo	
Belgium	Liège	Liège Airport	Cargo	
Belgium	Ostend	Ostend–Bruges International Airport	Cargo	
Bosnia and Herzegovina	Sarajevo	Sarajevo International Airport	Terminated	
Brazil	Campinas	Viracopos International Airport	Cargo	
Brazil	São Paulo	São Paulo/Guarulhos International Airport	Passenger + cargo	
Bulgaria	Sofia	Vasil Levski Sofia Airport	Terminated	
Cambodia	Phnom Penh	Phnom Penh International Airport	Airport closed	
Cambodia	Phnom Penh	Techo International Airport	Passenger + cargo	
Canada	Halifax	Halifax Stanfield International Airport	Terminated	
Canada	Montreal	Montréal–Trudeau International Airport	Passenger	
Canada	Toronto	Toronto Pearson International Airport	Passenger	
Chile	Santiago	Arturo Merino Benítez International Airport	Cargo	
China	Beijing	Beijing Capital International Airport	Terminated	
China	Beijing	Beijing Daxing International Airport	Passenger	
China	Chengdu	Chengdu Shuangliu International Airport	Terminated	
China	Chengdu	Chengdu Tianfu International Airport	Passenger	
China	Chongqing	Chongqing Jiangbei International Airport	Passenger	
China	Guangzhou	Guangzhou Baiyun International Airport	Passenger + cargo	
China	Hangzhou	Hangzhou Xiaoshan International Airport	Passenger	
China	Shanghai	Shanghai Pudong International Airport	Passenger + cargo	
Colombia	Bogotá	El Dorado International Airport	Begins 4 November 2026	
Croatia	Zagreb	Zagreb Airport	Passenger + cargo	
Cyprus	Larnaca	Larnaca International Airport	Passenger	
Czech Republic	Prague	Václav Havel Airport Prague	Passenger + cargo	
Democratic Republic of Congo	Kinshasa	N'Djili International Airport	Passenger	
Denmark	Copenhagen	Copenhagen Airport	Passenger	
Djibouti	Djibouti City	Djibouti–Ambouli International Airport	Passenger	
Ecuador	Quito	Mariscal Sucre International Airport	Cargo	
Egypt	Alexandria	Borg El Arab International Airport	Passenger	
Egypt	Cairo	Cairo International Airport	Passenger	
Egypt	Luxor	Luxor International Airport	Terminated	
Egypt	Sharm El Sheikh	Sharm El Sheikh International Airport	Terminated	
Eritrea	Asmara	Asmara International Airport	Terminated	
Ethiopia	Addis Ababa	Addis Ababa Bole International Airport	Passenger	
Finland	Helsinki	Helsinki Airport	Passenger + cargo	
France	Lyon	Lyon-Saint Exupery Airport	Terminated	
France	Nice	Nice Côte d'Azur Airport	Passenger	
France	Paris	Charles de Gaulle Airport	Passenger + cargo	
France	Toulouse	Toulouse–Blagnac Airport	Terminated	
Georgia	Tbilisi	Tbilisi International Airport	Passenger	
Germany	Berlin	Berlin Brandenburg Airport	Passenger	
Germany	Berlin	Berlin Tegel Airport	Airport closed	
Germany	Düsseldorf	Düsseldorf Airport	Passenger	
Germany	Frankfurt	Frankfurt Airport	Passenger + cargo	
Germany	Hamburg	Hamburg Airport	Passenger	
Germany	Hahn	Hahn Airport	Terminated	
Germany	Munich	Munich Airport	Passenger + cargo	
Germany	Stuttgart	Stuttgart Airport	Terminated	
Ghana	Accra	Accra International Airport	Passenger	
Greece	Athens	Athens International Airport	Passenger	
Greece	Mykonos	Mykonos Airport	Seasonal	
Greece	Santorini	Santorini International Airport	Terminated	
Greece	Thessaloniki	Thessaloniki Airport	Terminated	
Hungary	Budapest	Budapest Ferenc Liszt International Airport	Passenger + cargo	
Hong Kong	Hong Kong	Hong Kong International Airport	Passenger + cargo	
India	Ahmedabad	Sardar Vallabhbhai Patel International Airport	Passenger + cargo	
India	Amritsar	Sri Guru Ram Dass Jee International Airport	Passenger	
India	Bengaluru	Kempegowda International Airport	Passenger + cargo	
India	Chennai	Chennai International Airport	Passenger + cargo	
India	Delhi	Indira Gandhi International Airport	Passenger + cargo	
India	Goa	Manohar International Airport	Passenger	
India	Hyderabad	Rajiv Gandhi International Airport	Passenger + cargo	
India	Kochi	Cochin International Airport	Passenger + cargo	
India	Kolkata	Netaji Subhas Chandra Bose International Airport	Passenger + cargo	
India	Kozhikode	Calicut International Airport	Passenger	
India	Mumbai	Chhatrapati Shivaji Maharaj International Airport	Passenger + cargo	
India	Nagpur	Dr. Babasaheb Ambedkar International Airport	Passenger	
India	Thiruvananthapuram	Thiruvananthapuram International Airport	Passenger	
Indonesia	Denpasar	Ngurah Rai International Airport	Passenger	
Indonesia	Jakarta	Soekarno–Hatta International Airport	Passenger + cargo	
Indonesia	Medan	Kualanamu International Airport	Terminated	
Iran	Mashhad	Mashhad International Airport	Passenger	
Iran	Isfahan	Isfahan International Airport	Passenger	
Iran	Shiraz	Shiraz International Airport	Passenger	
Iran	Tehran	Imam Khomeini International Airport	Passenger + cargo	
Iraq	Basra	Basra International Airport	Passenger	
Iraq	Baghdad	Baghdad International Airport	Passenger	
Iraq	Erbil	Erbil International Airport	Passenger + cargo	
Iraq	Najaf	Al Najaf International Airport	Passenger	
Iraq	Sulaymaniyah	Sulaymaniyah International Airport	Passenger	
Ireland	Dublin	Dublin Airport	Passenger + cargo	
Italy	Milan	Milan Malpensa Airport	Passenger + cargo	
Italy	Pisa	Pisa International Airport	Terminated	
Italy	Rome	Rome Fiumicino Airport	Passenger	
Italy	Venice	Venice Marco Polo Airport	Passenger	
Ivory Coast	Abidjan	Félix-Houphouët-Boigny International Airport	Passenger	
Japan	Osaka	Kansai International Airport	Passenger	
Japan	Tokyo	Haneda Airport	Passenger	
Japan	Tokyo	Narita International Airport	Passenger + cargo	
Jordan	Amman	Queen Alia International Airport	Passenger	
Kazakhstan	Almaty	Almaty International Airport	Passenger + cargo	
Kazakhstan	Astana	Nursultan Nazarbayev International Airport	Terminated	
Kenya	Mombasa	Moi International Airport	Terminated	
Kenya	Nairobi	Jomo Kenyatta International Airport	Passenger + cargo	
Kuwait	Kuwait City	Kuwait International Airport	Passenger + cargo	
Lebanon	Beirut	Beirut–Rafic Hariri International Airport	Passenger + cargo	
Libya	Tripoli	Mitiga International Airport	Terminated	
Libya	Tripoli	Tripoli International Airport	Airport closed	
Luxembourg	Luxembourg City	Luxembourg Airport	Cargo	
Malaysia	Johor Bahru	Senai International Airport	Terminated	
Malaysia	Kuala Lumpur	Kuala Lumpur International Airport	Passenger	
Malaysia	Langkawi	Langkawi International Airport	Terminated	
Malaysia	Penang	Penang International Airport	Seasonal	
Macau	Macau	Macau International Airport	Cargo	
Maldives	Malé	Velana International Airport	Passenger	
Malta	Valletta	Malta International Airport	Passenger	
Mauritius	Plaine Magnien	Sir Seewoosagur Ramgoolam International Airport	Cargo	
Morocco	Casablanca	Mohammed V International Airport	Passenger + cargo	
Morocco	Marrakesh	Marrakesh Menara Airport	Passenger	
Mexico	Mexico City	Felipe Ángeles International Airport	Cargo	
Mozambique	Maputo	Maputo International Airport	Passenger	
Myanmar	Yangon	Yangon International Airport	Cargo	
Namibia	Windhoek	Hosea Kutako International Airport	Terminated	
Nepal	Kathmandu	Tribhuvan International Airport	Passenger	
Nepal	Siddharthanagar	Gautam Buddha International Airport	Terminated	
Netherlands	Amsterdam	Amsterdam Airport Schiphol	Passenger + cargo	
Netherlands	Maastricht	Maastricht Aachen Airport	Cargo	
New Zealand	Auckland	Auckland Airport	Passenger	
Nigeria	Abuja	Nnamdi Azikiwe International Airport	Passenger	
Nigeria	Kano	Mallam Aminu Kano International Airport	Passenger	
Nigeria	Lagos	Murtala Muhammed International Airport	Passenger + cargo	
Nigeria	Port Harcourt	Port Harcourt International Airport	Passenger	
North Macedonia	Skopje	Skopje International Airport	Cargo	
Norway	Oslo	Oslo Gardermoen Airport	Passenger + cargo	
Norway	Stavanger	Stavanger Airport	Terminated	
Oman	Muscat	Muscat International Airport	Passenger + cargo	
Oman	Salalah	Salalah International Airport	Passenger	
Oman	Sohar	Sohar Airport	Terminated	
Pakistan	Islamabad	Islamabad International Airport	Passenger	
Pakistan	Karachi	Jinnah International Airport	Passenger + cargo	
Pakistan	Lahore	Allama Iqbal International Airport	Passenger + cargo	
Pakistan	Multan	Multan International Airport	Passenger	
Pakistan	Faisalabad	Faisalabad International Airport	Passenger	
Pakistan	Peshawar	Bacha Khan International Airport	Passenger	
Pakistan	Sialkot	Sialkot International Airport	Passenger + cargo	
Peru	Lima	Jorge Chávez International Airport	Cargo	
Philippines	Cebu	Mactan–Cebu International Airport	Terminated	
Philippines	Clark	Clark International Airport	Passenger + cargo	
Philippines	Davao	Francisco Bangoy International Airport	Passenger	
Philippines	Manila	Ninoy Aquino International Airport	Passenger + cargo	
Poland	Warsaw	Warsaw Chopin Airport	Passenger	
Portugal	Lisbon	Lisbon Airport	Passenger	
Qatar	Doha	Doha International Airport	Airport closed	
Qatar	Doha	Hamad International Airport	Hub	
Romania	Bucharest	Bucharest Henri Coandă International Airport	Passenger	
Russia	Moscow	Moscow Domodedovo Airport	Terminated	
Russia	Moscow	Sheremetyevo International Airport	Passenger	
Russia	Saint Petersburg	Pulkovo Airport	Terminated	
Russia	Yekaterinburg	Koltsovo International Airport	Terminated	
Rwanda	Kigali	Kigali International Airport	Passenger	
Saudi Arabia	Abha	Abha International Airport	Passenger	
Saudi Arabia	al-Ula	Prince Abdul Majeed bin Abdulaziz International Airport	Passenger	
Saudi Arabia	Dammam	King Fahd International Airport	Passenger	
Saudi Arabia	Gassim	Prince Naif bin Abdulaziz International Airport	Passenger	
Saudi Arabia	Hail	Hail International Airport	Passenger	
Saudi Arabia	Hofuf	Al-Ahsa International Airport	Terminated	
Saudi Arabia	Jeddah	King Abdulaziz International Airport	Passenger	
Saudi Arabia	Medina	Prince Mohammad bin Abdulaziz International Airport	Passenger	
Saudi Arabia	Neom	Neom Bay Airport	Passenger	
Saudi Arabia	Riyadh	King Khalid International Airport	Passenger + cargo	
Saudi Arabia	Taif	Taif International Airport	Passenger	
Saudi Arabia	Tabuk	Red Sea International Airport	Passenger	
Saudi Arabia	Tabuk	Tabuk Regional Airport	Passenger	
Saudi Arabia	Yanbu	Yanbu Airport	Passenger	
Serbia	Belgrade	Belgrade Nikola Tesla Airport	Passenger	
Seychelles	Mahé	Seychelles International Airport	Passenger	
Singapore	Singapore	Changi Airport	Passenger + cargo	
Somalia	Mogadishu	Aden Adde International Airport	Passenger	
South Africa	Cape Town	Cape Town International Airport	Passenger	
South Africa	Durban	King Shaka International Airport	Passenger	
South Africa	Johannesburg	O. R. Tambo International Airport	Passenger + cargo	
South Korea	Seoul	Incheon International Airport	Passenger + cargo	
Spain	Barcelona	Josep Tarradellas Barcelona–El Prat Airport	Passenger	
Spain	Madrid	Adolfo Suárez Madrid–Barajas Airport	Passenger + cargo	
Spain	Málaga	Málaga Airport	Passenger	
Spain	Zaragoza	Zaragoza Airport	Cargo	
Sri Lanka	Colombo	Bandaranaike International Airport	Passenger	
Sudan	Khartoum	Khartoum International Airport	Terminated	
Sudan	Port Sudan	Port Sudan New International Airport	Passenger	
Sweden	Gothenburg	Göteborg Landvetter Airport	Terminated	
Sweden	Stockholm	Stockholm Arlanda Airport	Passenger + cargo	
Switzerland; France; Germany	Basel; Mulhouse; Freiburg	EuroAirport Basel Mulhouse Freiburg	Cargo	
Switzerland	Geneva	Geneva Airport	Passenger	
Switzerland	Zurich	Zurich Airport	Passenger	
Syria	Aleppo	Aleppo International Airport	Passenger	
Syria	Damascus	Damascus International Airport	Passenger	
Tanzania	Dar es Salaam	Julius Nyerere International Airport	Passenger	
Tanzania	Kilimanjaro	Kilimanjaro International Airport	Passenger	
Tanzania	Zanzibar	Abeid Amani Karume International Airport	Passenger	
Thailand	Bangkok	Don Mueang International Airport	Terminated	
Thailand	Bangkok	Suvarnabhumi Airport	Passenger	
Thailand	Chiang Mai	Chiang Mai International Airport	Terminated	
Thailand	Krabi	Krabi International Airport	Terminated	
Thailand	Pattaya	U-Tapao International Airport	Terminated	
Thailand	Phuket	Phuket International Airport	Passenger	
Tunisia	Tunis	Tunis–Carthage International Airport	Passenger	
Turkey	Adana	Adana Şakirpaşa Airport	Terminated	
Turkey	Ankara	Ankara Esenboğa Airport	Passenger	
Turkey	Antalya	Antalya Airport	Seasonal	
Turkey	Bodrum	Milas–Bodrum Airport	Seasonal	
Turkey	Istanbul	Atatürk Airport	Airport closed	
Turkey	Istanbul	Istanbul Airport	Passenger + cargo	
Turkey	Istanbul	Sabiha Gökçen International Airport	Passenger	
Turkey	İzmir	İzmir Adnan Menderes Airport	Terminated	
Turkey	Trabzon	Trabzon Airport	Seasonal	
Uganda	Entebbe	Entebbe International Airport	Passenger + cargo	
Ukraine	Kyiv	Boryspil International Airport	Airport closed	
Ukraine	Odesa	Odesa International Airport	Airport closed	
United Arab Emirates	Abu Dhabi	Zayed International Airport	Passenger	
United Arab Emirates	Dubai	Al Maktoum International Airport	Terminated	
United Arab Emirates	Dubai	Dubai International Airport	Passenger	
United Arab Emirates	Sharjah	Sharjah International Airport	Passenger	
United Arab Emirates	Ras Al Khaimah	Ras Al Khaimah International Airport	Terminated	
United Kingdom	Birmingham	Birmingham Airport	Passenger	
United Kingdom	Cardiff	Cardiff Airport	Terminated	
United Kingdom	East Midlands	East Midlands Airport	Cargo	
United Kingdom	Edinburgh	Edinburgh Airport	Passenger	
United Kingdom	London	Gatwick Airport	Passenger	
United Kingdom	London	Heathrow Airport	Passenger + cargo	
United Kingdom	London	London Stansted Airport	Cargo	
United Kingdom	Manchester	Manchester Airport	Passenger	
United States	Atlanta	Hartsfield–Jackson Atlanta International Airport	Passenger + cargo	
United States	Boston	Logan International Airport	Passenger + cargo	
United States	Chicago	O'Hare International Airport	Passenger + cargo	
United States	Chicago	Chicago Rockford International Airport	Cargo	
United States	Dallas	Dallas Fort Worth International Airport	Passenger + cargo	
United States	Honolulu	Daniel K. Inouye International Airport	Cargo	
United States	Houston	George Bush Intercontinental Airport	Passenger	
United States	Los Angeles	Los Angeles International Airport	Passenger + cargo	
United States	Miami	Miami International Airport	Passenger	
United States	Newark	Newark Liberty International Airport	Terminated	
United States	New York City	John F. Kennedy International Airport	Passenger + cargo	
United States	Philadelphia	Philadelphia International Airport	Passenger	
United States	Pittsburgh	Pittsburgh International Airport	Terminated	
United States	San Francisco	San Francisco International Airport	Passenger	
United States	Seattle	Seattle–Tacoma International Airport	Passenger	
United States	Washington, D.C.	Dulles International Airport	Passenger	
Uzbekistan	Tashkent	Tashkent International Airport	Passenger	
Venezuela	Caracas	Simón Bolívar International Airport	Begins 4 November 2026	
Vietnam	Da Nang	Da Nang International Airport	Terminated	
Vietnam	Hanoi	Noi Bai International Airport	Passenger + cargo	
Vietnam	Ho Chi Minh City	Tan Son Nhat International Airport	Passenger + cargo	
Yemen	Sanaa	Sanaa International Airport	Terminated	
Zambia	Lusaka	Kenneth Kaunda International Airport	Passenger	
Zimbabwe	Harare	Robert Gabriel Mugabe International Airport	Passenger	
