= List of Finnair destinations =

Finnair flies mainly within Europe, but also serves many destinations around the world with their A350 and A330 aircraft.

For a list of destinations managed by Nordic Regional Airlines on behalf of Finnair, see Nordic Regional Airlines destinations.

== Europe and domestic ==
Europe is Finnair's main market. Some domestic and European flights are partly operated on behalf of Finnair by Nordic Regional Airlines, using ATR and Embraer aircraft. Finnair operates flights to Europe using the Airbus A320 family. Some of Finnair's daily flights to London and Amsterdam are operated using an Airbus A350 XWB.

During the past few years, Finnair has launched several new routes to Europe and switched some from charter to scheduled flights. In the 2016 summer season, Finnair added four new scheduled routes in Europe, while eight charter/leisure routes were converted to scheduled service. Those routes are from Helsinki to Billund, Edinburgh, Mytilene, Preveza, Pula, Rimini, Santorini, Skiathos, Varna, Verona, and Zakinthos. In the summer season of 2017, Finnair began flying to several new destinations including Alicante, Corfu, Ibiza, Menorca, and Reykjavík (Keflavík). In 2017, Finnair saw the fastest growth in the airline's history by adding capacity to numerous destinations in Europe, Asia, and Latin America. In 2018, Finnair resumed flights to Lisbon and Stuttgart. The growth continued in winter of 2018 as the airline added up to 100 weekly flights, mostly within Europe. For example, Finnair began a new service to Lyon and made Edinburgh and Alanya (Gazipaza) year-round destinations.

== Asia ==
Asia is also an important market for Finnair. The airline serves around 20 destinations in Asia from its hub at Helsinki Airport, with around 100 weekly frequencies in the summer of 2018. Currently, most Asian routes are operated by Airbus A350 aircraft and some flights with the Airbus A330-300.

Finnair began service to Asia in 1976 with the carrier's first non-stop route to Bangkok. Seven years later, in 1983, the carrier opened its first non-stop route to Eastern Asia, to Tokyo, Japan. In June 1988, the airline started service to Beijing, its first destination in China. This made it the first western European airline to fly to that city.

China has become one of Finnair's main markets, along with Japan. Following the route to Beijing, the airline opened up four more destinations in China: Shanghai in 2003, Guangzhou in 2005 (ended in 2008 and resumed in 2016), Chongqing in 2012, and Xi'an in 2013. In addition, Finnair began a new service to Nanjing on 13 May 2018 increasing the number of destinations in China to seven, including Hong Kong, that is served with 10-12 weekly flights. Measured by passenger numbers, Japan is the largest market in Asia for Finnair, where the airline has four destinations. The number of destinations in Japan is the highest among the European airlines. These are Fukuoka which commenced in 2016, Nagoya, Osaka (a new route to Osaka opened up in 1995 and was the 5th intercontinental destination) and Tokyo. In the summer of 2018, the airline planned up to 35 weekly flights to Japan as well as to China. Seoul, South Korea is also among the growing destinations by passengers carried.

Finnair flies to several destinations in southeastern Asia. India has been in the airline's network since 2007 when service to Delhi started. Flights to Mumbai started in 2008 but were cancelled the same year due to the 2008 financial crisis and the 2008 Mumbai Attacks. The airline also planned services to Bangalore and Chennai. In addition, Finnair had a charter service to Goa but is now operated as a scheduled service. The route was previously operated via Dubai. In the region, Finnair has also served Colombo. Thailand is served by three Finnair services to Bangkok, Krabi, and Phuket, all of which are served by the A350. In Vietnam there is a service to Ho Chi Minh City, and previously to Hanoi. Finnair also has a daily service to Singapore.

On 20 June 2017, Finnair started its first route to Central Asia: Astana. The service is operated twice a week in the summer season.

In March 2013, Finnair announced that it was considering the following 13 potential new Asian destinations: Bangalore, Busan, Changsha, Chennai, Hangzhou, Jakarta, Kuala Lumpur, Kunming, Manila, Mumbai, Sapporo, Tianjin, and Ulaanbaatar. Fukuoka was also included, but the airline already commenced flights in May 2016. In 2006 Finnair planned to launch a service to Kuala Lumpur which was planned via Bangkok. However, Finnair cancelled the plan and switched the Helsinki–Singapore route to non-stop. Previously, it was operated via Bangkok.

During COVID-19, it discontinued flights to Mumbai and Goa.

In the future, Finnair is looking to expand its service to China even further by adding new destinations and increasing frequencies on main routes such as Beijing and Shanghai. However, existing bilateral agreements between Finland and China disallow more than seven weekly flights to the aforementioned cities. The airline is also considering adding new destinations and airports to its network in Japan, with Sapporo and Tokyo Haneda as targets. In addition, Finnair plans to expand in South Korea with a new possible service to Busan and by adding flights to Seoul. Malaysia and Indonesia have been mentioned as potential new markets as well.

== The Middle East ==
In the Middle East Finnair has several destinations, including Dubai in the United Arab Emirates and Tel Aviv and Eilat in Israel. As of winter 2018, Finnair planned to operate seven weekly flights to Dubai six days a week with both Airbus A321 narrow-body aircraft and Airbus A350 wide-body aircraft. Tel Aviv was served three to five times a week during the summer of 2018, and Eilat once a week in the winter season. In the past, Finnair used to serve Bahrain and Jordan.

In 2025, Finnair cancelled flights to Doha due to the heightened situation in the Middle East.

== Americas ==
Finnair has served North America since 1969: its first intercontinental route started on 15 May 1969 to New York City via Copenhagen and Amsterdam. Besides New York, Finnair flies to Chicago, San Francisco, Los Angeles, Miami, Dallas, and Seattle in the United States. Previously the airline also flew to Boston and Detroit. In Canada the carrier previously operated flights to Halifax, Montréal and Toronto. Halifax was used as a stopover on the carrier's Caribbean flights.

On 25 September 2015, Finnair announced that the airline would make the Miami route a year-round one, and add more frequencies to Chicago due to an increase in demand. While Finnair made Miami a year-round route, the airline discontinued its Toronto service. Now Finnair has seven scheduled routes to North America: Miami with three weekly frequencies in the winter season, New York with daily service and Chicago, a summer seasonal route with daily service from 2018, a thrice-weekly San Francisco service, and once-weekly service to Puerto Vallarta. Flights to Dallas-Fort Worth and Seattle were reintroduced for 2022.

From December 2017, Finnair flew to several destinations in the Caribbean including Havana and Puerto Plata, and to the Pacific coast such as Puerto Vallarta. Those destinations were previously served by charter flights, but all of them were switched to scheduled service. These routes are Finnair's first scheduled routes to Latin America. Puerto Vallarta is Finnair's first destination in North America that is regularly served with the Airbus A350, and the longest route. In Latin America, Finnair has flown to cities such as Recife, Fortaleza, Panama, Holguin, Varadero, Cartagena, and Margarita.

In addition to the scheduled destinations listed here, Finnair operates charter flights to a variety of destinations.

Finnair also had plan to bring back Toronto service and flights to Toronto will begin in 2026.

== City statistics ==
Finnair's top five airports in 2016 (ranked by monthly seat capacity)

Rank	Airport	Monthly one-way seats	Destinations served
1	Helsinki	▲656,088	135
2	Oulu	▲31,653	3
3	Stockholm–Arlanda	▲31,575	2
4	London–Heathrow	▲30,223	1
5	Paris–Charles de Gaulle	▼26,348	1

== List ==
Country/region	City	Airport	Notes	Refs
Åland	Mariehamn	Mariehamn Airport		
Albania	Tirana	Tirana International Airport Nënë Tereza	Seasonal	
Australia	Melbourne	Melbourne Airport		
Austria	Innsbruck	Innsbruck Airport	Seasonal	
Austria	Salzburg	Salzburg Airport	Seasonal	
Austria	Vienna	Vienna International Airport		
Bahrain	Manama	Bahrain International Airport	Terminated	
Belarus	Minsk	Minsk National Airport	Terminated	
Belgium	Brussels	Brussels Airport		
Brazil	Fortaleza	Fortaleza Airport	Terminated	
Brazil	Recife	Recife/Guararapes–Gilberto Freyre International Airport	Terminated	
Bulgaria	Burgas	Burgas Airport	Seasonal	
Bulgaria	Sofia	Sofia Airport	Terminated	
Canada	Halifax	Halifax Stanfield International Airport	Terminated	
Canada	Montréal	Montréal–Mirabel International Airport	Terminated	
Canada	Montréal	Montréal–Trudeau International Airport	Terminated	
Canada	Toronto	Toronto Pearson International Airport	Seasonal	
China	Beijing	Beijing Capital International Airport	Terminated	
China	Beijing	Beijing Daxing International Airport	Terminated	
China	Chongqing	Chongqing Jiangbei International Airport	Terminated	
China	Guangzhou	Guangzhou Baiyun International Airport	Terminated	
China	Nanjing	Nanjing Lukou International Airport	Terminated	
China	Shanghai	Shanghai Pudong International Airport		
China	Xi'an	Xi'an Xianyang International Airport	Seasonal	
Colombia	Bogotá	El Dorado International Airport	Terminated	
Colombia	Cartagena	Rafael Núñez International Airport	Terminated	
Croatia	Dubrovnik	Dubrovnik Airport	Seasonal	
Croatia	Pula	Pula Airport	Terminated	
Croatia	Split	Split Airport	Seasonal	
Croatia	Zagreb	Zagreb Airport	Terminated	
Cuba	Havana	José Martí International Airport	Seasonal	
Cuba	Holguin	Frank País Airport	Terminated	
Cuba	Varadero	Juan Gualberto Gómez Airport	Terminated	
Cyprus	Paphos	Paphos International Airport	Seasonal	
Czech Republic	Prague	Václav Havel Airport Prague		
Denmark	Billund	Billund Airport		
Denmark	Copenhagen	Copenhagen Airport		
Dominican Republic	Puerto Plata	Gregorio Luperón International Airport	Seasonal	
Dominican Republic	Punta Cana	Punta Cana International Airport		
Egypt	Cairo	Cairo International Airport	Terminated	
Egypt	Hurghada	Hurghada International Airport	Seasonal charter	
Egypt	Luxor	Luxor International Airport	Terminated	
Egypt	Marsa Alam	Marsa Alam International Airport	Terminated	
Egypt	Sharm El Sheikh	Sharm El Sheikh International Airport	Terminated	
Estonia	Tallinn	Tallinn Airport		
Estonia	Tartu	Tartu Airport		
Finland	Enontekiö	Enontekiö Airport	Terminated	
Finland	Helsinki	Helsinki Airport	Hub	
Finland	Ivalo	Ivalo Airport		
Finland	Joensuu	Joensuu Airport		
Finland	Jyväskylä	Jyväskylä Airport		
Finland	Kajaani	Kajaani Airport		
Finland	Kemi/Tornio	Kemi-Tornio Airport		
Finland	Kittilä	Kittilä Airport		
Finland	Kokkola	Kokkola-Pietarsaari Airport		
Finland	Kuopio	Kuopio Airport		
Finland	Kuusamo	Kuusamo Airport		
Finland	Lappeenranta	Lappeenranta Airport	Terminated	
Finland	Mikkeli	Mikkeli Airport	Terminated	
Finland	Oulu	Oulu Airport		
Finland	Pori	Pori Airport	Terminated	
Finland	Rovaniemi	Rovaniemi Airport		
Finland	Savonlinna	Savonlinna Airport	Terminated	
Finland	Tampere	Tampere-Pirkkala Airport		
Finland	Turku	Turku Airport	Terminated	
Finland	Vaasa	Vaasa Airport		
France	Biarritz	Biarritz Pays Basque Airport	Seasonal	
France	Bordeaux	Bordeaux–Mérignac Airport		
France	Lyon	Lyon–Saint-Exupéry Airport		
France	Nice	Nice Côte d'Azur Airport	Seasonal	
France	Paris	Charles de Gaulle Airport		
Germany	Berlin	Berlin Brandenburg Airport		
Germany	Berlin	Berlin Tegel Airport	Airport closed	
Germany	Cologne/Bonn	Cologne Bonn Airport	Terminated	
Germany	Düsseldorf	Düsseldorf Airport		
Germany	Frankfurt	Frankfurt Airport		
Germany	Hamburg	Hamburg Airport		
Germany	Hanover	Hannover Airport		
Germany	Munich	Munich Airport		
Germany	Nuremberg	Nuremberg Airport	Terminated	
Germany	Stuttgart	Stuttgart Airport		
Greece	Athens	Athens International Airport	Seasonal	
Greece	Chania	Chania International Airport	Seasonal	
Greece	Corfu	Corfu International Airport	Seasonal	
Greece	Heraklion	Heraklion International Airport	Seasonal	
Greece	Kos	Kos International Airport		
Greece	Mytilene	Mytilene International Airport	Seasonal	
Greece	Rhodes	Rhodes International Airport	Seasonal	
Greece	Santorini	Santorini (Thira) International Airport	Seasonal	
Greece	Skiathos	Skiathos International Airport	Seasonal	
Hong Kong	Hong Kong	Hong Kong International Airport		
Hong Kong	Hong Kong	Kai Tak Airport	Airport closed	
Hungary	Budapest	Budapest Ferenc Liszt International Airport		
Iceland	Reykjavík	Keflavík International Airport		
India	Delhi	Indira Gandhi International Airport		
India	Goa	Dabolim Airport	Terminated	
India	Mumbai	Chhatrapati Shivaji Maharaj International Airport	Terminated	
Iraq	Baghdad	Baghdad International Airport	Terminated	
Ireland	Dublin	Dublin Airport		
Israel	Eilat	Ovda Airport	Terminated	
Israel	Tel Aviv	Ben Gurion Airport		
Italy	Bologna	Bologna Guglielmo Marconi Airport		
Italy	Catania	Catania–Fontanarossa Airport		
Italy	Florence	Florence Airport		
Italy	Milan	Milan Linate Airport		
Italy	Milan	Milan Malpensa Airport		
Italy	Naples	Naples International Airport	Seasonal	
Italy	Pisa	Pisa International Airport	Seasonal	
Italy	Rome	Leonardo da Vinci–Fiumicino Airport		
Italy	Venice	Venice Marco Polo Airport	Seasonal	
Italy	Verona	Verona Villafranca Airport	Seasonal	
Japan	Fukuoka	Fukuoka Airport	Terminated	
Japan	Nagoya	Chubu Centrair International Airport		
Japan	Osaka	Kansai International Airport		
Japan	Sapporo	New Chitose Airport	Terminated	
Japan	Tokyo	Haneda Airport		
Japan	Tokyo	Narita International Airport		
Jordan	Amman	Queen Alia International Airport	Terminated	
Jordan	Aqaba	King Hussein International Airport	Terminated	
Kazakhstan	Astana	Nursultan Nazarbayev International Airport	Seasonal	
Kenya	Mombasa	Moi International Airport	Terminated	
Latvia	Riga	Riga International Airport		
Lithuania	Kaunas	Kaunas Airport	Seasonal	
Lithuania	Vilnius	Vilnius Čiurlionis International Airport		
Luxembourg	Luxembourg City	Luxembourg Airport	Terminated	
Malaysia	Langkawi	Langkawi International Airport	Terminated	
Malta	Valletta	Malta International Airport	Seasonal	
Mexico	Cancún	Cancún International Airport	Terminated	
Mexico	Puerto Vallarta	Licenciado Gustavo Díaz Ordaz International Airport	Terminated	
Montenegro	Tivat	Tivat Airport	Terminated	
Morocco	Agadir	Agadir–Al Massira Airport	Seasonal	
Netherlands	Amsterdam	Amsterdam Airport Schiphol		
North Macedonia	Ohrid	Ohrid St. Paul the Apostle Airport	Terminated	
Norway	Bergen	Bergen Airport, Flesland		
Norway	Bodø	Bodø Airport		
Norway	Kirkenes	Kirkenes Airport		
Norway	Lakselv	Lakselv Banak Airport	Terminated	
Norway	Oslo	Oslo Airport, Gardermoen		
Norway	Stavanger	Stavanger Airport		
Norway	Trondheim	Trondheim Airport		
Norway	Tromsø	Tromsø Airport		
Panama	Panama City	Tocumen International Airport	Terminated	
Poland	Gdańsk	Gdańsk Lech Wałęsa Airport		
Poland	Kraków	Kraków John Paul II International Airport		
Poland	Warsaw	Warsaw Chopin Airport		
Poland	Wrocław	Wrocław Airport	Terminated	
Portugal	Faro	Faro Airport		
Portugal	Funchal	Madeira Airport	Seasonal	
Portugal	Lisbon	Lisbon Airport		
Portugal	Ponta Delgada	João Paulo II Airport	Terminated	
Portugal	Porto	Porto Airport	Seasonal	
Qatar	Doha	Hamad International Airport		
Romania	Bucharest	Henri Coandă International Airport	Terminated	
Russia	Kazan	Kazan International Airport	Terminated	
Russia	Moscow	Sheremetyevo International Airport	Suspended	
Russia	Murmansk	Murmansk Airport	Terminated	
Russia	Petrozavodsk	Petrozavodsk Airport	Terminated	
Russia	Saint Petersburg	Pulkovo Airport	Suspended	
Russia	Samara	Kurumoch Airport	Terminated	
Russia	Yekaterinburg	Koltsovo International Airport	Terminated	
Singapore	Singapore	Changi Airport		
Slovenia	Ljubljana	Ljubljana Jože Pučnik Airport		
South Korea	Seoul	Incheon International Airport		
Spain	Alicante	Alicante–Elche Miguel Hernández Airport		
Spain	Barcelona	Josep Tarradellas Barcelona–El Prat Airport		
Spain	Fuerteventura	Fuerteventura Airport	Seasonal charter	
Spain	Jerez de la Frontera	Jerez Airport	Terminated	
Spain	Ibiza	Ibiza Airport	Terminated	
Spain	Lanzarote	Lanzarote Airport		
Spain	Las Palmas	Gran Canaria Airport	Seasonal	
Spain	Madrid	Madrid–Barajas Airport		
Spain	Málaga	Málaga Airport		
Spain	Menorca	Menorca Airport	Terminated	
Spain	Murcia	Murcia–San Javier Airport	Terminated	
Spain	Palma de Mallorca	Palma de Mallorca Airport	Seasonal	
Spain	Tenerife	Tenerife North Airport	Seasonal	
Spain	Tenerife	Tenerife South Airport	Seasonal	
Spain	Valencia	Valencia Airport		
Sri Lanka	Colombo	Bandaranaike International Airport	Terminated	
Sweden	Gothenburg	Göteborg Landvetter Airport		
Sweden	Malmö	Malmö Airport	Terminated	
Sweden	Östersund	Åre Östersund Airport	Terminated	
Sweden	Stockholm	Stockholm Arlanda Airport		
Sweden	Stockholm	Stockholm Bromma Airport	Terminated	
Sweden	Sundsvall	Midlanda Airport	Terminated	
Sweden	Umeå	Umeå Airport	Terminated	
Sweden	Visby	Visby Airport	Seasonal	
Switzerland	Geneva	Geneva Airport		
Switzerland	Zürich	Zurich Airport		
Thailand	Bangkok	Don Mueang International Airport	Terminated	
Thailand	Bangkok	Suvarnabhumi Airport		
Thailand	Krabi	Krabi International Airport ^{Seasonal}	Terminated	
Thailand	Pattaya	U-Tapao International Airport	Terminated	
Thailand	Phuket	Phuket International Airport	Seasonal	
Tunisia	Enfidha	Enfidha–Hammamet International Airport	Terminated	
Turkey	Alanya	Gazipaşa–Alanya Airport		
Turkey	Antalya	Antalya Airport	Seasonal	
Turkey	Istanbul	Atatürk Airport	Airport closed	
Ukraine	Kyiv	Boryspil International Airport	Terminated	
United Arab Emirates	Dubai	Al Maktoum International Airport	Terminated	
United Arab Emirates	Dubai	Dubai International Airport	Seasonal	
United Arab Emirates	Sharjah	Sharjah International Airport	Terminated	
United Kingdom	Edinburgh	Edinburgh Airport		
United Kingdom	London	Gatwick Airport	Terminated	
United Kingdom	London	Heathrow Airport		
United Kingdom	Manchester	Manchester Airport		
United States	Boston	Logan International Airport	Terminated	
United States	Chicago	O'Hare International Airport	Seasonal	
United States	Dallas	Dallas Fort Worth International Airport		
United States	Detroit	Detroit Metropolitan Airport	Terminated	
United States	Fort Lauderdale	Fort Lauderdale–Hollywood International Airport	Terminated	
United States	Los Angeles	Los Angeles International Airport		
United States	Miami	Miami International Airport	Seasonal	
United States	New York City	John F. Kennedy International Airport		
United States	San Francisco	San Francisco International Airport	Terminated	
United States	Seattle	Seattle–Tacoma International Airport	Seasonal	
United States	West Palm Beach	Palm Beach International Airport	Terminated	
Venezuela	Caracas	Simón Bolívar International Airport	Terminated	
Venezuela	Isla Margarita	Santiago Mariño Caribbean International Airport	Terminated	
Vietnam	Hanoi	Noi Bai International Airport	Terminated	
Vietnam	Ho Chi Minh City	Tan Son Nhat International Airport	Terminated	
