= List of Swiss International Air Lines destinations =

This is a list of destinations served by Swiss International Air Lines including those served by franchise Helvetic Airways as of January 2023.

It includes the city, country, and the airport's name, with the airline's hubs marked. The list also contains the beginning and end year of services, with destinations marked if the services were not continual and if they are seasonal, and for dates which occur in the future.

== Destinations ==
Country	City	Airport	Notes	Refs
Albania	Tirana	Tirana International Airport Nënë Tereza		
Argentina	Buenos Aires	Ministro Pistarini International Airport		
Austria	Graz	Graz Airport		
Austria	Linz	Linz Airport	Terminated	
Austria	Salzburg	Salzburg Airport	Terminated	
Austria	Vienna	Vienna International Airport		
Belgium	Brussels	Brussels Airport		
Bosnia and Herzegovina	Sarajevo	Sarajevo International Airport		
Brazil (Note: Flights to Rio de Janeiro and Phuket are now operated by Edelweiss Air.)	Rio de Janeiro	Rio de Janeiro/Galeão International Airport	Terminated	
Brazil	São Paulo	São Paulo/Guarulhos International Airport		
Bulgaria	Sofia	Vasil Levski Sofia Airport		
Cameroon	Douala	Douala International Airport	Terminated	
Cameroon	Yaoundé	Yaoundé Nsimalen International Airport	Terminated	
Canada	Montreal	Montréal–Trudeau International Airport		
Canada	Toronto	Toronto Pearson International Airport	Seasonal	
Chile	Santiago	Arturo Merino Benítez International Airport	Terminated	
China	Beijing	Beijing Capital International Airport	Terminated	
China	Beijing	Beijing Daxing International Airport	Terminated	
China	Shanghai	Shanghai Pudong International Airport		
Croatia	Dubrovnik	Dubrovnik Airport	Seasonal	
Croatia	Pula	Pula Airport	Terminated	
Croatia	Zagreb	Zagreb Airport	Terminated	
Czech Republic	Prague	Václav Havel Airport Prague		
Denmark	Billund	Billund Airport	Terminated	
Denmark	Copenhagen	Copenhagen Airport		
Egypt	Cairo	Cairo International Airport		
Equatorial Guinea	Malabo	Malabo International Airport	Terminated	
Estonia	Tallinn	Tallinn Airport		
Finland	Helsinki	Helsinki Airport	Terminated	
Finland	Kittilä	Kittilä Airport	Seasonal	
France	Biarritz	Biarritz Pays Basque Airport	Seasonal	
France	Bordeaux	Bordeaux–Mérignac Airport		
France	Marseille	Marseille Provence Airport		
France	Nantes	Nantes Atlantique Airport	Seasonal	
France	Nice	Nice Côte d'Azur Airport		
France	Paris	Charles de Gaulle Airport		
France	Toulouse	Toulouse–Blagnac Airport	Seasonal; Resumes 25 June 2027	
Gabon	Libreville	Libreville International Airport	Terminated	
Germany	Berlin	Berlin Brandenburg Airport		
Germany	Berlin	Berlin Tegel Airport	Airport closed	
Germany	Bremen	Bremen Airport		
Germany	Cologne	Cologne/Bonn Airport	Terminated	
Germany	Dresden	Dresden Airport		
Germany	Düsseldorf	Düsseldorf Airport		
Germany	Hamburg	Hamburg Airport		
Germany	Hanover	Hannover Airport		
Germany	Heringsdorf	Heringsdorf Airport	Seasonal	
Germany	Leipzig	Leipzig/Halle Airport	Terminated	
Germany	Munich	Munich Airport		
Germany	Nuremberg	Nuremberg Airport	Terminated	
Germany	Stuttgart	Stuttgart Airport		
Germany	Sylt	Sylt Airport	Seasonal	
Ghana	Accra	Accra International Airport	Terminated	
Greece	Athens	Athens International Airport		
Greece	Corfu	Corfu International Airport	Seasonal	
Greece	Heraklion	Heraklion International Airport	Seasonal	
Greece	Kalamata	Kalamata International Airport	Seasonal	
Greece	Kos	Kos International Airport	Seasonal	
Greece	Mykonos	Mykonos Airport	Seasonal	
Greece	Rhodes	Rhodes International Airport	Seasonal	
Greece	Thessaloniki	Thessaloniki Airport		
Greece	Zakynthos	Zakynthos International Airport	Seasonal	
Hong Kong	Hong Kong	Hong Kong International Airport		
Hungary	Budapest	Budapest Ferenc Liszt International Airport		
India	Bengaluru	Kempegowda International Airport		
India	Delhi	Indira Gandhi International Airport		
India	Mumbai	Chhatrapati Shivaji Maharaj International Airport		
Iran	Tehran	Imam Khomeini International Airport	Terminated	
Ireland	Cork	Cork Airport	Seasonal	
Ireland	Dublin	Dublin Airport		
Israel	Tel Aviv	Ben Gurion Airport		
Italy	Bari	Bari Karol Wojtyła Airport	Terminated	
Italy	Bologna	Bologna Guglielmo Marconi Airport		
Italy	Brindisi	Brindisi Airport		
Italy	Catania	Catania–Fontanarossa Airport	Seasonal	
Italy	Florence	Florence Airport		
Italy	Genoa	Genoa Cristoforo Colombo Airport	Terminated	
Italy	Milan	Milan Malpensa Airport		
Italy	Naples	Naples International Airport		
Italy	Olbia	Olbia Costa Smeralda Airport	Seasonal	
Italy	Palermo	Falcone Borsellino Airport		
Italy	Rome	Rome Fiumicino Airport		
Italy	Turin	Turin Airport	Terminated	
Italy	Venice	Venice Marco Polo Airport		
Japan	Osaka	Kansai International Airport	Terminated	
Japan	Tokyo	Narita International Airport		
Jersey	St Brelade	Jersey Airport	Terminated	
Kenya	Nairobi	Jomo Kenyatta International Airport	Terminated	
Kosovo	Pristina	Pristina International Airport		
Latvia	Riga	Riga International Airport	Terminated	
Lebanon	Beirut	Beirut–Rafic Hariri International Airport		
Libya	Benina	Benina International Airport	Terminated	
Libya	Tripoli	Tripoli International Airport	Airport closed	
Lithuania	Vilnius	Vilnius Čiurlionis International Airport		
Luxembourg	Luxembourg	Luxembourg Airport		
Malta	Luqa	Malta International Airport	Seasonal	
Morocco	Casablanca	Mohamed V International Airport	Terminated	
Morocco	Marrakesh	Marrakesh Menara Airport		
Netherlands	Amsterdam	Amsterdam Airport Schiphol		
Netherlands	Rotterdam	Rotterdam The Hague Airport	Terminated	
Nigeria	Lagos	Murtala Muhammed International Airport	Terminated	
Norway	Bergen	Bergen Airport, Flesland	Terminated	
Norway	Oslo	Oslo Airport, Gardermoen		
Oman	Muscat	Muscat International Airport	Terminated	
Pakistan	Karachi	Jinnah International Airport	Terminated	
Peru	Lima	Jorge Chávez International Airport	Terminated	
Philippines	Manila	Ninoy Aquino International Airport	Terminated	
Poland	Gdańsk	Gdańsk Lech Wałęsa Airport		
Poland	Kraków	Kraków John Paul II International Airport		
Poland	Poznań	Poznań–Ławica Airport		
Poland	Warsaw	Warsaw Chopin Airport		
Poland	Wrocław	Wrocław Airport		
Portugal	Faro	Faro Airport	Seasonal	
Portugal	Funchal	Madeira Airport	Seasonal	
Portugal	Lisbon	Lisbon Airport		
Portugal	Ponta Delgada	João Paulo II Airport	Seasonal	
Portugal	Porto	Porto Airport		
Romania	Bucharest	Bucharest Henri Coandă International Airport		
Romania	Cluj-Napoca	Cluj International Airport		
Russia	Moscow	Moscow Domodedovo Airport	Suspended	
Russia	Saint Petersburg	Pulkovo Airport	Suspended	
Saudi Arabia	Jeddah	King Abdulaziz International Airport	Terminated	
Saudi Arabia	Riyadh	King Khalid International Airport	Terminated	
Serbia	Belgrade	Belgrade Nikola Tesla Airport		
Serbia	Niš	Niš Constantine the Great Airport	Seasonal	
Singapore	Singapore	Changi Airport		
Slovakia	Košice	Košice International Airport		
Slovenia	Ljubljana	Ljubljana Jože Pučnik Airport		
South Africa	Johannesburg	O. R. Tambo International Airport		
South Korea	Seoul	Incheon International Airport	Seasonal	
Spain	Alicante	Alicante–Elche Miguel Hernández Airport		
Spain	Barcelona	Josep Tarradellas Barcelona–El Prat Airport		
Spain	Bilbao	Bilbao Airport	Terminated	
Spain	Las Palmas	Gran Canaria Airport	Terminated	
Spain	Ibiza	Ibiza Airport	Seasonal	
Spain	Madrid	Madrid–Barajas Airport		
Spain	Málaga	Málaga Airport		
Spain	Menorca	Menorca Airport	Seasonal	
Spain	Palma de Mallorca	Palma de Mallorca Airport		
Spain	Santiago de Compostela	Santiago–Rosalía de Castro Airport	Terminated	
Spain	Tenerife	Tenerife South Airport	Terminated	
Spain	Valencia	Valencia Airport		
Sweden	Gothenburg	Göteborg Landvetter Airport		
Sweden	Stockholm	Stockholm Arlanda Airport		
Switzerland	Geneva	Geneva Airport	Focus city	
Switzerland	Lugano	Lugano Airport	Terminated	
Switzerland	Zurich	Zurich Airport	Hub	
Switzerland; France; Germany	Basel; Mulhouse; Freiburg	EuroAirport Basel Mulhouse Freiburg	Terminated	
Tanzania	Dar es Salaam	Julius Nyerere International Airport	Terminated	
Thailand	Bangkok	Don Mueang International Airport	Terminated	
Thailand	Bangkok	Suvarnabhumi Airport		
Tunisia	Tunis	Tunis–Carthage International Airport	Terminated	
Turkey	Antalya	Antalya Airport	Seasonal	
Turkey	Bodrum	Milas–Bodrum Airport	Terminated	
Turkey	Dalaman	Dalaman Airport	Terminated	
Turkey	Istanbul	Atatürk Airport	Airport closed	
Turkey	Istanbul	Istanbul Airport	Terminated	
Ukraine	Kyiv	Boryspil International Airport	Terminated	
United Arab Emirates	Abu Dhabi	Zayed International Airport	Terminated	
United Arab Emirates	Dubai	Dubai International Airport		
United Kingdom	Birmingham	Birmingham Airport		
United Kingdom	Bristol	Bristol Airport	Seasonal	
United Kingdom	London	Gatwick Airport		
United Kingdom	London	Heathrow Airport		
United Kingdom	London	London City Airport		
United Kingdom	Manchester	Manchester Airport		
United States	Boston	Logan International Airport		
United States	Chicago	O'Hare International Airport		
United States	Los Angeles	Los Angeles International Airport		
United States	Miami	Miami International Airport		
United States	Newark	Newark Liberty International Airport		
United States	New York City	John F. Kennedy International Airport		
United States	San Francisco	San Francisco International Airport		
United States	Washington, D.C.	Dulles International Airport		
Venezuela	Caracas	Simón Bolívar International Airport	Terminated	
