= List of Aegean Airlines destinations =

As of 2026, Aegean Airlines flies to 133 destinations, excluding charter flights and flights it operates for its subsidiary, Olympic Air.

== List ==
Country	City	Airport	Notes	Refs
Albania	Tirana	Tirana International Airport Nënë Tereza		
Armenia	Yerevan	Zvartnots International Airport		
Austria	Innsbruck	Innsbruck Airport	Seasonal	
Austria	Vienna	Vienna International Airport		
Azerbaijan	Baku	Heydar Aliyev International Airport	Seasonal	
Belgium	Brussels	Brussels Airport		
Bosnia and Herzegovina	Banja Luka	Banja Luka International Airport	Seasonal charter	
Bosnia and Herzegovina	Sarajevo	Sarajevo International Airport	Seasonal	
Bulgaria	Sofia	Vasil Levski Sofia Airport		
Croatia	Dubrovnik	Dubrovnik Airport	Seasonal	
Croatia	Split	Split Airport	Seasonal	
Croatia	Zadar	Zadar Airport	Terminated	
Croatia	Zagreb	Zagreb Airport		
Cyprus	Larnaca	Larnaca International Airport	Focus city	
Cyprus	Paphos	Paphos International Airport		
Czech Republic	Prague	Václav Havel Airport Prague		
Denmark	Billund	Billund Airport	Terminated	
Denmark	Copenhagen	Copenhagen Airport		
Egypt	Alexandria	Borg El Arab International Airport	Seasonal	
Egypt	Cairo	Cairo International Airport		
Egypt	Luxor	Luxor International Airport	Seasonal	
Egypt	Sharm El Sheikh	Sharm El Sheikh International Airport	Seasonal	
Estonia	Tallinn	Tallinn Airport		
Finland	Helsinki	Helsinki Airport		
Finland	Oulu	Oulu Airport	Seasonal charter	
France	Bordeaux	Bordeaux–Mérignac Airport	Seasonal	
France	Brest	Brest Bretagne Airport	Seasonal	
France	Deauville	Deauville–Normandie Airport	Seasonal	
France	Dole	Dole–Jura Airport	Terminated	
France	Lille	Lille Airport	Seasonal	
France	Lyon	Lyon–Saint-Exupéry Airport	Seasonal	
France	Marseille	Marseille Provence Airport	Seasonal	
France	Metz/Nancy	Metz–Nancy–Lorraine Airport	Seasonal	
France	Nantes	Nantes Atlantique Airport	Seasonal	
France	Nice	Nice Côte d'Azur Airport		
France	Paris	Charles de Gaulle Airport		
France	Strasbourg	Strasbourg Airport		
France	Toulouse	Toulouse–Blagnac Airport	Seasonal	
Georgia	Tbilisi	Tbilisi International Airport		
Germany	Berlin	Berlin Brandenburg Airport		
Germany	Berlin	Berlin Tegel Airport	Airport closed	
Germany	Bremen	Bremen Airport	Seasonal charter	
Germany	Cologne	Cologne Bonn Airport		
Germany	Düsseldorf	Düsseldorf Airport		
Germany	Erfurt	Erfurt–Weimar Airport	Seasonal charter	
Germany	Frankfurt	Frankfurt Airport		
Germany	Friedrichshafen	Friedrichshafen Airport	Seasonal charter	
Germany	Hamburg	Hamburg Airport		
Germany	Hanover	Hannover Airport	Seasonal	
Germany	Karlsruhe	Karlsruhe/Baden-Baden Airport	Terminated	
Germany	Kassel	Kassel Airport	Terminated	
Germany	Memmingen	Memmingen Airport	Seasonal charter	
Germany	Münster	Münster Osnabrück Airport	Seasonal charter	
Germany	Munich	Munich Airport		
Germany	Nuremberg	Nuremberg Airport	Seasonal	
Germany	Stuttgart	Stuttgart Airport		
Greece	Alexandroupoli	Alexandroupoli Airport		
Greece	Athens	Athens International Airport	Hub	
Greece	Athens	Ellinikon International Airport	Airport closed	
Greece	Cephalonia	Kefalonia International Airport		
Greece	Chania	Chania International Airport	Focus city	
Greece	Chios	Chios Island National Airport		
Greece	Corfu	Corfu International Airport		
Greece	Heraklion	Heraklion International Airport	Focus city	
Greece	Ioannina	Ioannina National Airport		
Greece	Kalamata	Kalamata International Airport	Focus city	
Greece	Kavala	Kavala International Airport		
Greece	Kos	Kos International Airport		
Greece	Lemnos	Lemnos International Airport		
Greece	Mykonos	Mykonos International Airport		
Greece	Mytilene	Mytilene International Airport		
Greece	Rhodes	Rhodes International Airport		
Greece	Samos	Samos International Airport		
Greece	Santorini	Santorini International Airport		
Greece	Sitia	Sitia Public Airport	Terminated	
Greece	Skyros	Skyros Island National Airport	Terminated	
Greece	Thessaloniki	Thessaloniki Airport	Hub	
Greece	Zakynthos	Zakynthos International Airport	Seasonal	
Hungary	Budapest	Budapest Ferenc Liszt International Airport		
Iran	Tehran	Imam Khomeini International Airport	Terminated	
Iraq	Baghdad	Baghdad International Airport		
Iraq	Erbil	Erbil International Airport		
Ireland	Dublin	Dublin Airport		
Israel	Tel Aviv	Ben Gurion Airport		
Italy	Bari	Bari Karol Wojtyła Airport	Seasonal	
Italy	Bologna	Bologna Guglielmo Marconi Airport		
Italy	Catania	Catania–Fontanarossa Airport	Seasonal	
Italy	Florence	Florence Airport		
Italy	Genoa	Genoa Cristoforo Colombo Airport	Terminated	
Italy	Lamezia Terme	Lamezia Terme International Airport	Terminated	
Italy	Milan	Milan Linate Airport	Terminated	
Italy	Milan	Milan Malpensa Airport		
Italy	Naples	Naples International Airport		
Italy	Olbia	Olbia Costa Smeralda Airport	Seasonal	
Italy	Palermo	Falcone Borsellino Airport	Seasonal	
Italy	Pisa	Pisa International Airport	Seasonal	
Italy	Rome	Rome Fiumicino Airport		
Italy	Turin	Turin Airport	Terminated	
Italy	Venice	Venice Marco Polo Airport		
Italy	Verona	Verona Villafranca Airport	Terminated	
Jordan	Amman	Queen Alia International Airport		
Kuwait	Kuwait City	Kuwait International Airport		
Latvia	Riga	Riga International Airport		
Lebanon	Beirut	Beirut–Rafic Hariri International Airport		
Lithuania	Vilnius	Vilnius Čiurlionis International Airport		
Luxembourg	Luxembourg City	Luxembourg Airport		
Malta	Valletta	Malta International Airport		
Moldova	Chișinău	Chișinău Eugen Doga International Airport		
Montenegro	Podgorica	Podgorica Airport		
Morocco	Casablanca	Mohammed V International Airport	Terminated	
Morocco	Marrakesh	Marrakesh Menara Airport		
Netherlands	Amsterdam	Amsterdam Airport Schiphol		
Netherlands	Eindhoven	Eindhoven Airport		
Norway	Kristiansand	Kristiansand Airport	Seasonal charter	
Norway	Oslo	Oslo Gardermoen Airport		
Poland	Kraków	Kraków John Paul II International Airport		
Poland	Warsaw	Warsaw Chopin Airport		
Portugal	Lisbon	Lisbon Airport		
Portugal	Porto	Porto Airport		
North Macedonia	Skopje	Skopje International Airport		
Romania	Brașov	Brașov-Ghimbav International Airport	Seasonal charter	
Romania	Bucharest	Bucharest Henri Coandă International Airport		
Romania	Cluj-Napoca	Cluj International Airport	Terminated	
Russia	Moscow	Moscow Domodedovo Airport	Terminated	
Russia	Nizhny Novgorod	Nizhny Novgorod International Airport	Terminated	
Russia	Perm	Perm International Airport	Terminated	
Russia	Rostov-on-Don	Rostov-on-Don Airport	Airport closed	
Russia	Saint Petersburg	Pulkovo Airport	Terminated	
Russia	Yekaterinburg	Koltsovo International Airport	Terminated	
Saudi Arabia	Dammam	King Fahd International Airport	Seasonal	
Saudi Arabia	Jeddah	King Abdulaziz International Airport		
Saudi Arabia	Riyadh	King Khalid International Airport		
Serbia	Belgrade	Belgrade Nikola Tesla Airport		
Slovakia	Bratislava	Bratislava Airport	Terminated	
Slovenia	Ljubljana	Ljubljana Airport	Seasonal	
Spain	Barcelona	Josep Tarradellas Barcelona–El Prat Airport		
Spain	Bilbao	Bilbao Airport		
Spain	Ibiza	Ibiza Airport	Seasonal	
Spain	Gran Canaria	Gran Canaria Airport	Seasonal	
Spain	Málaga	Málaga Airport		
Spain	Madrid	Adolfo Suárez Madrid–Barajas Airport		
Spain	Palma de Mallorca	Palma de Mallorca Airport	Seasonal	
Spain	Seville	Seville Airport	Seasonal	
Spain	Valencia	Valencia Airport	Seasonal	
Sweden	Stockholm	Stockholm Arlanda Airport		
Sweden	Gothenburg	Göteborg Landvetter Airport	Seasonal	
Switzerland	Geneva	Geneva Airport		
Switzerland	Zurich	Zurich Airport		
Switzerland; France; Germany	Basel; Mulhouse; Freiburg	EuroAirport Basel Mulhouse Freiburg		
Syria	Damascus	Damascus International Airport	Begins 2 December 2026	
Tunisia	Tunis	Tunis–Carthage International Airport		
Turkey	Istanbul	Atatürk Airport	Airport closed	
Turkey	Istanbul	Istanbul Airport		
Turkey	İzmir	İzmir Adnan Menderes Airport		
Ukraine	Kyiv	Boryspil International Airport	Terminated	
Ukraine	Kyiv	Kyiv Zhuliany International Airport	Terminated	
Ukraine	Mariupol	Mariupol International Airport	Terminated	
United Arab Emirates	Abu Dhabi	Zayed International Airport		
United Arab Emirates	Dubai	Dubai International Airport		
United Kingdom	Birmingham	Birmingham Airport	Terminated	
United Kingdom	Bristol	Bristol Airport	Terminated	
United Kingdom	Edinburgh	Edinburgh Airport		
United Kingdom	London	Gatwick Airport	Seasonal	
United Kingdom	London	Heathrow Airport		
United Kingdom	London	London Stansted Airport	Terminated	
United Kingdom	Manchester	Manchester Airport		
United Kingdom	Newcastle upon Tyne	Newcastle International Airport	Terminated	
