= List of Pegasus Airlines destinations =

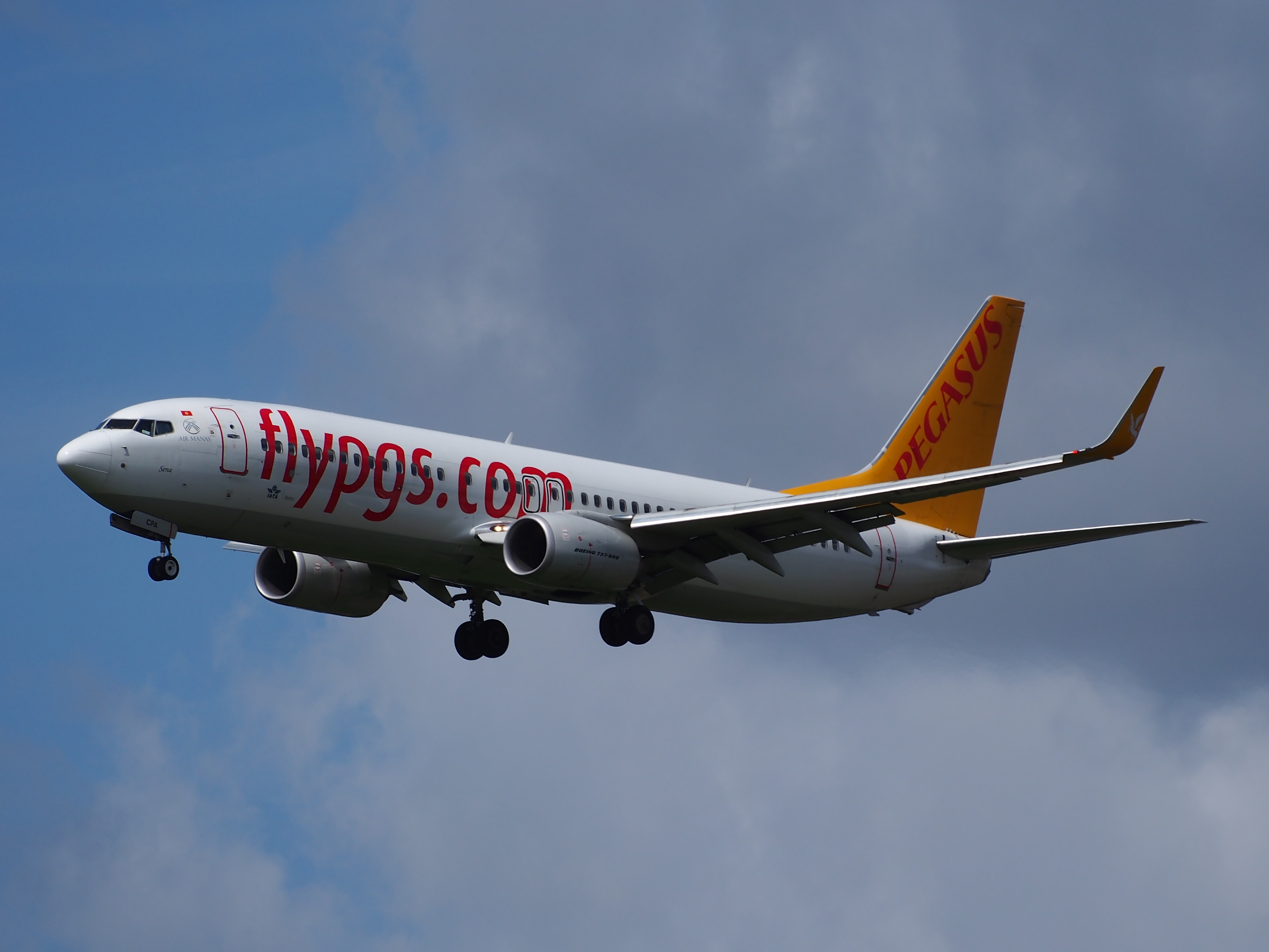
Pegasus Airlines Boeing 737-800

This is a list of current and former destinations served by Turkish low-cost airline Pegasus Airlines. It includes destinations served by partners IZair and Pegasus Asia.

The list includes the city, country, the codes of the International Air Transport Association (IATA airport code) and the International Civil Aviation Organization (ICAO airport code), and the airport's name, with the airline's hubs marked. The list also contains the beginning and end year of services, with destinations marked if the services were not continual and if they are seasonal, and for dates which occur in the future (as of January 2017).

== List ==
Country	City	Airport	Notes	Refs
Albania	Tirana	Tirana International Airport Nënë Tereza		
Algeria	Algiers	Houari Boumediene Airport		
Armenia	Yerevan	Zvartnots International Airport		
Austria	Vienna	Vienna Airport		
Azerbaijan	Baku	Heydar Aliyev International Airport		
Azerbaijan	Ganja	Ganja International Airport		
Bahrain	Bahrain	Bahrain International Airport		
Belgium	Charleroi	Brussels South Charleroi Airport		
Bosnia and Herzegovina	Sarajevo	Sarajevo International Airport		
Bosnia and Herzegovina	Tuzla	Tuzla International Airport	Terminated	
Bulgaria	Plovdiv	Plovdiv Airport		
Bulgaria	Sofia	Vasil Levski Sofia Airport		
Croatia	Zagreb	Zagreb Airport		
Cyprus	North Nicosia	Ercan International Airport	Base	
Czech Republic	Prague	Václav Havel Airport Prague		
Denmark	Copenhagen	Copenhagen Airport		
Egypt	Alexandria	Alexandria International Airport		
Egypt	Cairo (Giza)	Sphinx International Airport		
Egypt	Hurghada	Hurghada International Airport		
Egypt	Sharm El Sheikh	Sharm El Sheikh International Airport		
Finland	Helsinki	Helsinki Airport		
France	Lyon	Lyon–Saint-Exupéry Airport		
France	Marseille	Marseille Provence Airport		
France	Paris	Charles de Gaulle Airport	Terminated	
France	Paris	Orly Airport		
France	Saint-Étienne	Saint-Étienne–Bouthéon Airport	Terminated	
Germany	Berlin	Berlin Brandenburg Airport		
Germany	Bremen	Bremen Airport		
Germany	Cologne/Bonn	Cologne Bonn Airport		
Germany	Dortmund	Dortmund Airport		
Germany	Düsseldorf	Düsseldorf Airport		
Germany	Erfurt/Weimar	Erfurt–Weimar Airport		
Germany	Frankfurt	Frankfurt Airport		
Germany	Hamburg	Hamburg Airport		
Germany	Hanover	Hannover Airport		
Germany	Leipzig	Leipzig/Halle Airport		
Germany	Munich	Munich Airport		
Germany	Nuremberg	Nuremberg Airport		
Germany	Stuttgart	Stuttgart Airport		
Georgia	Batumi	Alexander Kartveli Batumi International Airport		
Georgia	Kutaisi	David the Builder Kutaisi International Airport	Coming soon	
Georgia	Tbilisi	Shota Rustaveli Tbilisi International Airport		
Greece	Athens	Athens International Airport		
Greece	Rhodes	Rhodes International Airport		
Hungary	Budapest	Budapest Ferenc Liszt International Airport		
India	Delhi	Indira Gandhi International Airport	Terminated	
Iran	Tabriz	Tabriz Shahid Madani International Airport	Terminated	
Iran	Tehran	Imam Khomeini International Airport	Terminated	
Iraq	Baghdad	Baghdad International Airport		
Iraq	Basra	Basra International Airport		
Iraq	Erbil	Erbil International Airport		
Ireland	Dublin	Dublin Airport		
Israel	Tel Aviv	Ben Gurion Airport	Terminated	
Italy	Bergamo	Milan Bergamo Airport		
Italy	Bologna	Bologna Guglielmo Marconi Airport		
Italy	Rome	Rome Fiumicino Airport		
Italy	Venice	Venice Marco Polo Airport		
Jordan	Amman	Queen Alia International Airport		
Kazakhstan	Almaty	Almaty International Airport		
Kazakhstan	Aqtau	Aqtau Airport		
Kazakhstan	Aqtöbe	Aliya Moldagulova International Airport		
Kazakhstan	Astana	Nursultan Nazarbayev International Airport		
Kazakhstan	Atyrau	Atyrau Airport		
Kazakhstan	Oral	Mänşük Mämetova Oral International Airport		
Kazakhstan	Şymkent	Şymkent International Airport		
Kosovo	Pristina	Pristina International Airport		
Kuwait	Kuwait City	Kuwait International Airport		
Kyrgyzstan	Bishkek	Manas International Airport		
Kyrgyzstan	Osh	Osh Airport		
Lebanon	Beirut	Beirut–Rafic Hariri International Airport		
Libya	Tripoli	Mitiga International Airport		
Moldova	Chișinău	Chișinău Eugen Doga International Airport		
Morocco	Casablanca	Mohammed V International Airport		
Netherlands	Amsterdam	Amsterdam Airport Schiphol		
Netherlands	Eindhoven	Eindhoven Airport		
Netherlands	Rotterdam	Rotterdam The Hague Airport		
North Macedonia	Skopje	Skopje International Airport		
Norway	Oslo	Oslo Airport, Gardermoen		
Oman	Muscat	Muscat International Airport		
Pakistan	Karachi	Jinnah International Airport		
Poland	Krakow	Kraków John Paul II International Airport		
Poland	Warsaw	Warsaw Chopin Airport		
Portugal	Lisbon	Lisbon Airport		
Qatar	Doha	Hamad International Airport		
Romania	Bucharest	Bucharest Henri Coandă International Airport		
Russia	Chelyabinsk	Chelyabinsk Airport	Terminated	
Russia	Grozny	Grozny Airport		
Russia	Krasnodar	Krasnodar International Airport	Terminated	
Russia	Krasnoyarsk	Yemelyanovo International Airport	Terminated	
Russia	Makhachkala	Uytash Airport	Terminated	
Russia	Mineralnye Vody	Mineralnye Vody Airport		
Russia	Moscow	Moscow Domodedovo Airport		
Russia	Nizhny Novgorod	Strigino Airport	Terminated	
Russia	Novosibirsk	Tolmachevo Airport	Terminated	
Russia	Omsk	Omsk Tsentralny Airport	Terminated	
Russia	Perm	Perm International Airport	Terminated	
Russia	Saint Petersburg	Pulkovo Airport		
Russia	Samara	Kurumoch Airport	Terminated	
Russia	Sochi	Sochi International Airport	Terminated	
Russia	Volgograd	Gumrak Airport	Terminated	
Russia	Yekaterinburg	Koltsovo Airport	Terminated	
Saudi Arabia	Dammam	King Fahd International Airport		
Saudi Arabia	Jeddah	King Abdulaziz International Airport		
Saudi Arabia	Medina	Prince Mohammad bin Abdulaziz International Airport		
Saudi Arabia	Riyadh	King Khalid International Airport		
Spain	Barcelona	Josep Tarradellas Barcelona–El Prat Airport		
Spain	Madrid	Adolfo Suárez Madrid–Barajas Airport		
Spain	Seville	Seville Airport		
Serbia	Belgrade	Belgrade Nikola Tesla Airport		
Slovakia	Bratislava	Bratislava Airport		
Sweden	Stockholm	Stockholm Arlanda Airport		
Switzerland	Geneva	Geneva Airport		
Switzerland	Zurich	Zurich Airport		
Switzerland; France; Germany	Basel; Mulhouse; Freiburg	EuroAirport Basel Mulhouse Freiburg		
Syria	Aleppo	Aleppo International Airport		
Tajikistan	Dushanbe	Dushanbe International Airport	Terminated	
Tajikistan	Khujand	Khujand Airport	Terminated	
Turkey	Adana/Mersin	Çukurova International Airport		
Turkey	Alanya/Gazipaşa	Gazipaşa Airport		
Turkey	Amasya/Merzifon	Amasya Merzifon Airport		
Turkey	Ankara	Ankara Esenboğa Airport	Base	
Turkey	Antalya	Antalya Airport	Base	
Turkey	Batman	Batman Airport		
Turkey	Bingöl	Bingöl Airport		
Turkey	Edremit	Balıkesir Koca Seyit Airport		
Turkey	Bodrum/Milas	Milas–Bodrum Airport	Base	
Turkey	Dalaman	Dalaman Airport	Base	
Turkey	Denizli	Denizli Çardak Airport		
Turkey	Diyarbakir	Diyarbakır Airport		
Turkey	Elazığ	Elazığ Airport		
Turkey	Erzincan	Erzincan Airport		
Turkey	Erzurum	Erzurum Airport		
Turkey	Gaziantep	Oğuzeli Airport		
Turkey	Hatay	Hatay Airport		
Turkey	Iğdır	Iğdır Airport		
Turkey	Istanbul	Istanbul Airport	Base	
Turkey	Istanbul	Sabiha Gökçen International Airport	Base	
Turkey	İzmir	İzmir Adnan Menderes Airport	Base	
Turkey	Kahramanmaraş	Kahramanmaraş Airport		
Turkey	Kars	Kars Harakani Airport		
Turkey	Kayseri	Erkilet International Airport	Base	
Turkey	Konya	Konya Airport		
Turkey	Kütahya	Zafer Airport		
Turkey	Malatya	Malatya Erhaç Airport		
Turkey	Mardin	Mardin Airport		
Turkey	Muş	Muş Airport		
Turkey	Ordu	Ordu–Giresun Airport		
Turkey	Rize	Rize-Artvin Airport		
Turkey	Samsun	Samsun-Çarşamba Airport	Base	
Turkey	Şanlıurfa	Şanlıurfa GAP Airport		
Turkey	Şırnak	Şırnak Airport	Terminated	
Turkey	Sinop	Sinop Airport		
Turkey	Sivas	Sivas Airport		
Turkey	Tekirdağ	Tekirdağ Çorlu Airport		
Turkey	Trabzon	Trabzon Airport	Base	
Turkey	Van	Van Ferit Melen Airport		
Ukraine	Kharkiv	Kharkiv International Airport	Terminated	
Ukraine	Kherson	Kherson International Airport	Terminated	
Ukraine	Kyiv	Boryspil International Airport	Terminated	
Ukraine	Kyiv	Kyiv International Airport (Zhuliany)	Terminated	
Ukraine	Lviv	Lviv Danylo Halytskyi International Airport	Terminated	
Ukraine	Odesa	Odesa International Airport	Terminated	
Ukraine	Zaporizhzhia	Zaporizhzhia International Airport	Terminated	
United Arab Emirates	Abu Dhabi	Zayed International Airport		
United Arab Emirates	Dubai	Dubai International Airport		
United Arab Emirates	Sharjah	Sharjah International Airport		
United Kingdom (England)	Birmingham	Birmingham Airport		
United Kingdom (England)	Bristol	Bristol Airport		
United Kingdom (England)	London	Gatwick Airport		
United Kingdom (England)	London	London Stansted Airport		
United Kingdom (England)	Manchester	Manchester Airport		
United Kingdom (Scotland)	Edinburgh	Edinburgh Airport		
Uzbekistan	Andizhan	Andizhan Airport	Begins 18 December 2026	
Uzbekistan	Bukhara	Bukhara International Airport	Begins 14 December 2026	
Uzbekistan	Termez	Termez Airport	Begins 1 March 2027	
