= List of airlines of Kosovo =

This is a list of airlines currently operating in Kosovo:

Airline	Image	IATA	ICAO	Callsign	Hub airport(s)	Commenced operations	Notes
Kosova Airlines			KOS		Pristina International Airport	2003	No fleet since 2006, but still flying with German low cost airlines.
Air Prishtina		ST			Pristina International Airport	1981	
My Wings		C3	TDR	MY WINGS	Pristina International Airport	2020	1 Airbus A319 (9A-BTJ) and 1 Boeing 737-800 (9A-LAB) leased from Croatian Trade Air.

== See also ==
- List of defunct airlines of Kosovo
- List of airports in Kosovo
- List of defunct airlines of Europe
- List of airlines of Yugoslavia
