= Kosova Airlines =

Flag carrier of Kosovo

- Founded: 2003
- Commenced operations: 1 December 2003
- Ceased operations: 10 May 2006 (became part of Eurokoha)
- Hubs: Pristina
- Fleet size: 5
- Destinations: 11
- Parent company: Eurokoha
- Headquarters: Pristina, Kosovo; Frankfurt, Germany; Zurich, Switzerland
- Website: Official website

Kosova Airlines is a defunct airline that later became a virtual airline based at Pristina International Airport.

== History ==
In the fall of 2003, the United Nations Interim Administration Mission in Kosovo (UNMIK) and the Government of Kosovo, through the Ministry of Transport and Telecommunications, launched a tender for the establishment of a national airline under the name Kosova Airlines. The tender was awarded to the private German company Hamburg International, in partnership with local agencies Eurokoha, Kosova Reisen and Malësia Reisen. The initial contract was for a duration of three years, with the possibility of a two-year extension.

On 10 May 2006, Kosova Airlines ceased flight operations after returning its last aircraft—a wet leased Boeing 737-700—to Hamburg International, which is no longer in operation. Following this, Kosova Airlines became part of Eurokoha and continues to function as a virtual airline, offering flights between Pristina and Zurich through Swiss International Air Lines, as well as between Antalya and Prishtina through the Turkish airline SunExpress.

=== Livery ===
The livery of the leased aircraft was never fully painted in a complete scheme. The aircraft featured a dark blue tail, similar to the one on the original Hamburg International livery. In the center of the tail was a dark yellow map of Kosovo. The fuselage was white, with the Hamburg International logo placed near the cockpit. Below the passenger windows, on the side towards the cockpit, the text "Operated in cooperation with Kosova Airlines" was displayed.

== Destinations ==
Kosova Airlines, during its time as an independent airline, flew to the following destinations:

- Austria
  - Innsbruck
  - Salzburg
- Germany
  - Berlin
  - Cologne
  - Düsseldorf
  - Frankfurt
  - Hamburg
  - Hanover
  - Munich
  - Stuttgart
- Italy
  - Bologna
  - Verona
- Kosovo
  - Pristina
- Malta
  - Luqa
- Switzerland
  - Geneva
  - Zürich
  - Basel
- Spain
  - Palma de Mallorca
  - Ibiza
- Turkey
  - Antalya

== Former fleet ==
- Fokker 50
- McDonnell Douglas MD-80
- Boeing 737-700

== See also ==
- List of airlines of Kosovo
