= List of airports in Kosovo =

Map

This is a list of airports in Kosovo.

== Airports ==
Airport names shown in bold indicate the airport has scheduled service on commercial airlines.

Location	ICAO	IATA	Airport name	Coordinates
International airports
Pristina	BKPR	PRN	**Pristina International Airport** / Slatina Air Base	42°34′22″N 021°02′09″E
Domestic airports
Gjakova			Gjakova Airport	42°26′07″N 020°25′39″E
Podujevë (Dumosh)			Dumosh-Batllava Airfield	42°50′44″N 021°13′12″E

== See also ==
- Transport in Kosovo
- List of airports by ICAO code: B#BK - Kosovo
- Wikipedia: WikiProject Aviation/Airline destination lists: Europe#Kosovo
