= Stuttgart Airport =

Airport serving Stuttgart, Baden-Württemberg, Germany

Stuttgart Airport Flughafen Stuttgart

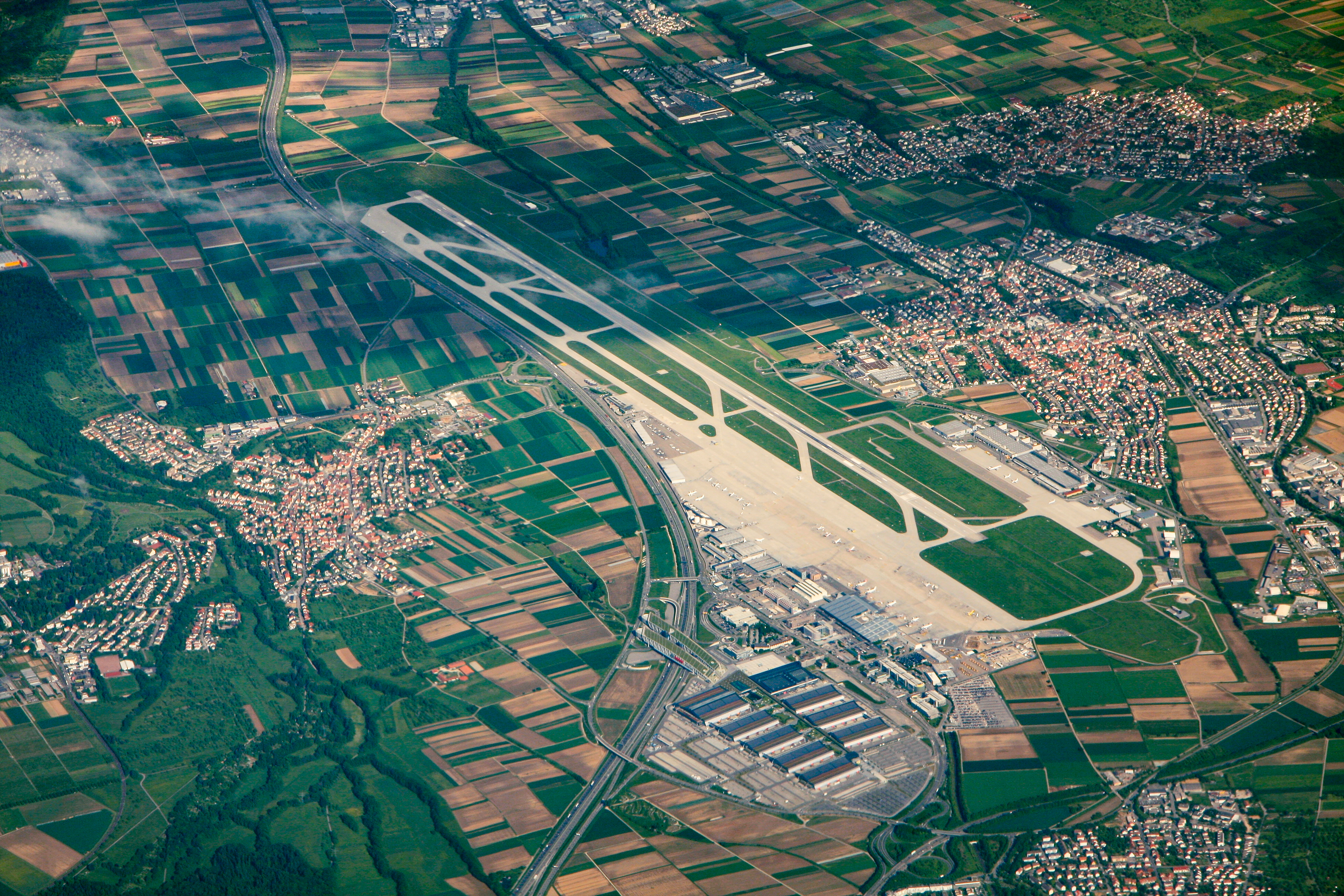
- IATA: STR; ICAO: EDDS

Summary
- Airport type: Public
- Operator: Flughafen Stuttgart GmbH
- Serves: Stuttgart Metropolitan Region
- Location: Leinfelden-Echterdingen, Filderstadt and Stuttgart, Baden-Württemberg, Germany
- Opened: 1948; 78 years ago
- Operating base for: Condor; Eurowings; SunExpress; TUI fly Deutschland
- Built: 1939; 87 years ago
- Elevation AMSL: 1,276 ft (389 m)
- Coordinates: 48°41′24″N 009°13′19″E
- Website: www.stuttgart-airport.com

Maps
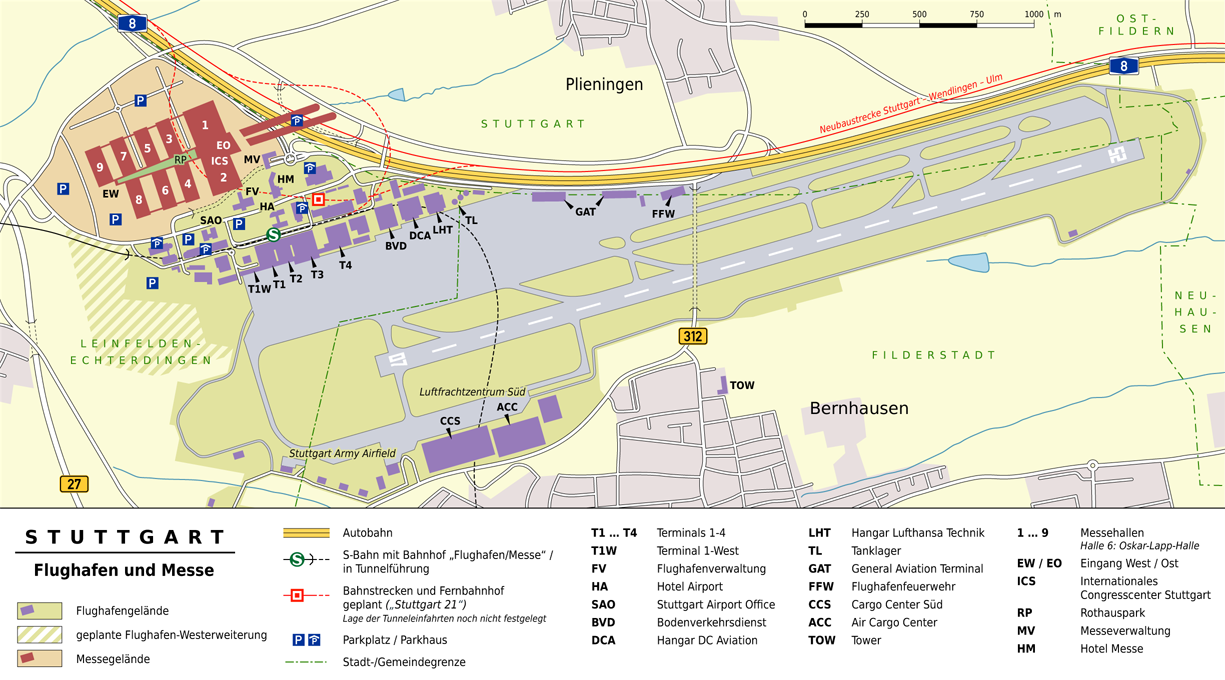
- Map of the airport

- Location within Baden-Württemberg

Runways
Direction	Length		Surface
Direction	m	ft	Surface
07/25	3,345	10,974	Concrete

Helipads
Number	Length		Surface
Number	m	ft	Surface
H1	30	98	Concrete

Statistics (2025)
- Passengers: 9,585,033 ▲+4.7%
- Aircraft movements: 95,765 ▲+1.7%
- Cargo (metric tons): 34,597 ▼-4.3%
- Sources: Statistics at ADV., AIP at German air traffic control.

Stuttgart Airport (German: Flughafen Stuttgart), formerly Flughafen Stuttgart-Echterdingen (IATA: STR, ICAO: EDDS), is an international airport serving Stuttgart, the capital of the German state of Baden-Württemberg. It is christened in honor of Stuttgart's former mayor, Manfred Rommel, son of Erwin Rommel, and is the sixth busiest airport in Germany with 11,832,634 passengers having passed through its doors in 2018. The facility covers approximately 400 hectares (1,000 acres), of which 190 hectares are green space.

The airport is operated by Flughafen Stuttgart GmbH (FSG). It goes back to Luftverkehr Württemberg AG, which was founded in 1924 and initially operated Böblingen Airport. Since 2008, 65% of the operating company is owned by the state of Baden-Württemberg and 35% by the city of Stuttgart. It is located approximately 13 km (8.1 mi) (10 km (6.2 mi) in a straight line) south of Stuttgart and lies on the boundary between the nearby town of Leinfelden-Echterdingen, Filderstadt and Stuttgart itself. In 2007, the Messe Stuttgart convention center – the ninth biggest exhibition centre in Germany – moved to grounds directly next to the airport. Additionally, the global headquarters for car parking company APCOA Parking are located here.

== History ==
=== Early years and World War II ===
The airport was built in 1939 to replace Böblingen Airport.

For the duration of the Cold War the runway and facilities were shared with the United States Army who operated helicopters, the Grumman OV-1 Mohawk and other fixed wing aircraft as Echterdingen Army Airfield on the southern portion of the airfield. Some of the units operating at Echterdingen were headquartered at nearby Nellingen Kaserne- now closed and redeveloped. In 1984–5, the 223rd Aviation Battalion (Combat) of the 11th Aviation Group (Combat) was headquartered at Echterdingen, with three aviation companies assigned (one at Schwäbisch Hall). The U.S. Army still maintains a small helicopter base - Stuttgart Army Airfield - on the southern side of the airport, which it shares with the Baden-Württemberg Police helicopter wing. The police helicopter wing falls under the control of Stuttgart Police Department and has six modern helicopters based at Stuttgart and two in Söllingen.

=== The airport in the 1950s–1990s ===
The airport was expanded after World War II. The runway was extended to 1,800 m (5,906 ft) in 1948, then to 2,250 m (7,382 ft) in 1961 and finally to 3,345 m (10,974 ft) in 1996. Renovation was scheduled for 2020, full closure phase was preponed to be completed in April during the corona lockdown.

The original 1938 terminal was finally replaced in 2004 and there are now four terminals with a maximum capacity of approximately 12 million passengers.

Politicians, town planners and nearby residents have been arguing for years about the construction of a second runway. However, on 25 June 2008, Minister-President Günther Oettinger announced that for the next 8–12 years no second runway will be built and that the restrictions for night operations stay in place.

=== Development since 2010 ===
After the death of former mayor Manfred Rommel in November 2013 local politicians proposed renaming the airport after him. This proposal caused public disputes as he was the son of Erwin Rommel but also highly respected for his work on intercultural affairs. In July 2014, it has been announced that the airport will be named Flughafen Stuttgart - Manfred Rommel Flughafen from now on. In September 2016, the airport unveiled new branding and corporate design, changing its official name from Flughafen Stuttgart to Stuttgart Airport.

In September 2014, United Airlines cancelled their route to Stuttgart from Newark due to insufficient demand leaving Stuttgart Airport with only one remaining long-haul connection to Atlanta provided by Delta Air Lines.

In October 2014, easyJet announced they would serve Stuttgart as their seventh German destination by March 2015. In December 2014, Ryanair also added Stuttgart as a destination in their network with six weekly flights to Manchester from April 2015.

Air Berlin announced the start of a service to Abu Dhabi from December 2014. On 31 May 2016, Air Berlin ceased its flights to Abu Dhabi. In October 2016, Air Berlin announced it would close its maintenance facilities at the airport due to cost cutting and restructuring measures.

In July 2020, Lauda announced the closure of their base at Stuttgart Airport – which has been operated as a wetlease for Ryanair — by October 2020. Prior to this announcement, the base staff rejected a new labour agreement.

In August 2024, Delta Air Lines announced the end of their flights to Stuttgart from Atlanta after already having reduced their service to a seasonal one in March 2023. This marked the end of the connection after 36 years (with a three-year hiatus from 2020 to 2023 due to COVID-19) and will deprive the airport of any scheduled long-haul destinations.

== Terminals ==
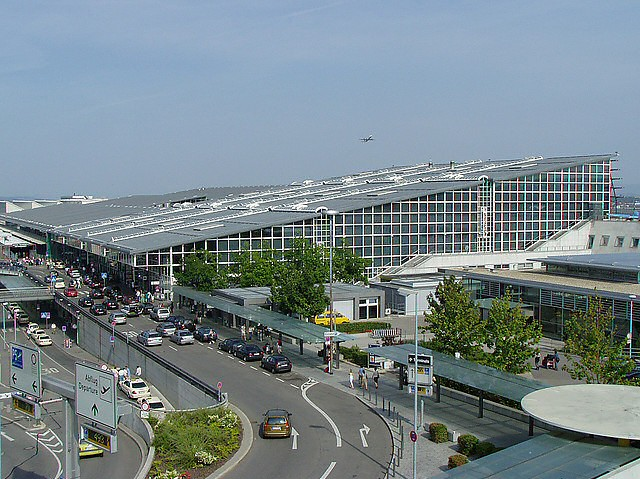
Landside view of Terminals 1 to 3

Stuttgart Airport consists of four passenger terminals which have separate check-in facilities and entrances but are directly connected to each other and share a single airside area which features eight jet bridges as well as about two dozen bus-boarding stands.

- Terminal 1 is the first of two landside main halls and features together with its addition Terminal 1-West 50 check-in counters. It shares the roof with Terminals 2 and 3 and is mainly used by Eurowings and Turkish Airlines.
- Terminal 2 is a small area featuring nine check-in counters and a security checkpoint. It is located within the shopping area between the main halls of Terminals 1 and 3. It is used by Lufthansa & Star Alliance partners in addition to their counters in Terminal 1.
- Terminal 3 is the second of the two landside main halls east of Terminal 1 and 2 and features 39 additional check-in counters. It is used by TUIfly and KLM among several other airlines.
- Terminal 4 is, unlike the other three terminals, a separate and very basic equipped building to the east of Terminals 1 to 3 but also connected to them by a walk way. It features 17 more check-in counters as well as several bus-boarding gates and is used mostly for holiday charter operations. In March 2018, the airport administration announced that Terminal 4 will be entirely rebuilt and expanded in the coming years.

== Airlines and destinations ==
=== Passenger ===
The following airlines offer regular scheduled and charter flights at Stuttgart Airport:

Airlines	Destinations
Aegean Airlines	Athens, Thessaloniki
Air Cairo	Seasonal: Hurghada, Marsa Alam
Air Serbia	Belgrade
AJet	Istanbul–Sabiha Gökçen; Seasonal: Ankara, Adana/Mersin, Antalya, Dalaman (begins 23 April 2027), Kayseri, Milas/Bodrum (begins 1 July 2027), Samsun
Austrian Airlines	Vienna
Condor	Seasonal: Dubai–International, Funchal, Gran Canaria, Heraklion, Hurghada, Palma de Mallorca, Tenerife–South
Corendon Airlines	Seasonal: Antalya, Heraklion, Hurghada
Chair Airlines	Pristina
Croatia Airlines	Seasonal: Dubrovnik
Electra Airways	Seasonal: Burgas, Varna
Eurowings	Alicante, Amman–Queen Alia, Athens, Barcelona, Beirut, Berlin, Bremen, Budapest, Catania, Chișinău, Copenhagen (begins 29 March 2027), Faro, Gran Canaria, Hamburg, La Palma, Lisbon, London–Gatwick, London–Heathrow, Madrid (begins 29 March 2027), Málaga, Manchester, Milan–Malpensa, Naples, Palma de Mallorca, Pristina, Rome–Fiumicino, Sarajevo, Split, Stockholm–Arlanda, Thessaloniki, Valencia, Vienna, Zagreb; Seasonal: Adana/Mersin, Agadir, Antalya, Bari, Bastia, Bilbao, Brindisi, Bucharest–Otopeni, Burgas, Cagliari, Chania, Corfu, Dubai–International, Dublin, Dubrovnik, Edinburgh, Fuerteventura, Funchal, Heraklion, Hurghada, Iași, Ibiza, İzmir, Jeddah, Kalamata, Kavala, Kos, Kraków, Lamezia Terme, Malta, Marrakesh, Marsa Alam, Mostar, Mykonos, Nice, Olbia, Palermo, Porto, Preveza/Lefkada, Pula, Rhodes, Rijeka, Rovaniemi, Santorini, Sylt, Tbilisi, Tenerife–South, Timișoara, Tirana, Tivat, Tromsø, Tunis, Varna, Venice, Zadar, Zakynthos; Seasonal charter: Arvidsjaur
Enter Air	Pristina
FlyErbil	Erbil
FlyOne	Chișinău
Freebird Airlines	Seasonal: Antalya
GP Aviation	Pristina
Israir	Seasonal: Tel Aviv
KLM	Amsterdam
LOT Polish Airlines	Warsaw–Chopin
Lufthansa	Munich
Nouvelair	Seasonal: Djerba, Monastir
Pegasus Airlines	Ankara, Istanbul–Sabiha Gökçen, İzmir, Kayseri
Scandinavian Airlines	Copenhagen; Seasonal: Oslo
Sky Alps	Bolzano
SunExpress	Adana/Mersin, Ankara, Antalya, Gaziantep, İzmir, Kayseri, Samsun; Seasonal: Bodrum, Bursa, Dalaman, Diyarbakır, Edremit, Elazığ, Konya, Ordu–Giresun, Trabzon
Swiss International Air Lines	Zürich
TUI fly Deutschland	Boa Vista, Fuerteventura, Funchal, Gran Canaria, Hurghada, Lanzarote, Palma de Mallorca, Sal, Tenerife–South; Seasonal: Corfu, Dalaman, Djerba, Faro, Heraklion, Jerez de la Frontera, Kos, Marsa Alam, Menorca, Patras, Rhodes
Turkish Airlines	Istanbul
Ur Airlines	Erbil
Vueling	Barcelona
Wizz Air	Bucharest–Otopeni, Budapest, Cluj-Napoca, Skopje, Sofia, Tirana

=== Cargo ===
Airlines	Destinations
Atlas Air	Birmingham (AL)
DHL Aviation	Cologne/Bonn, Leipzig/Halle
FedEx Feeder	Liège, Paris-Charles de Gaulle

== Statistics ==
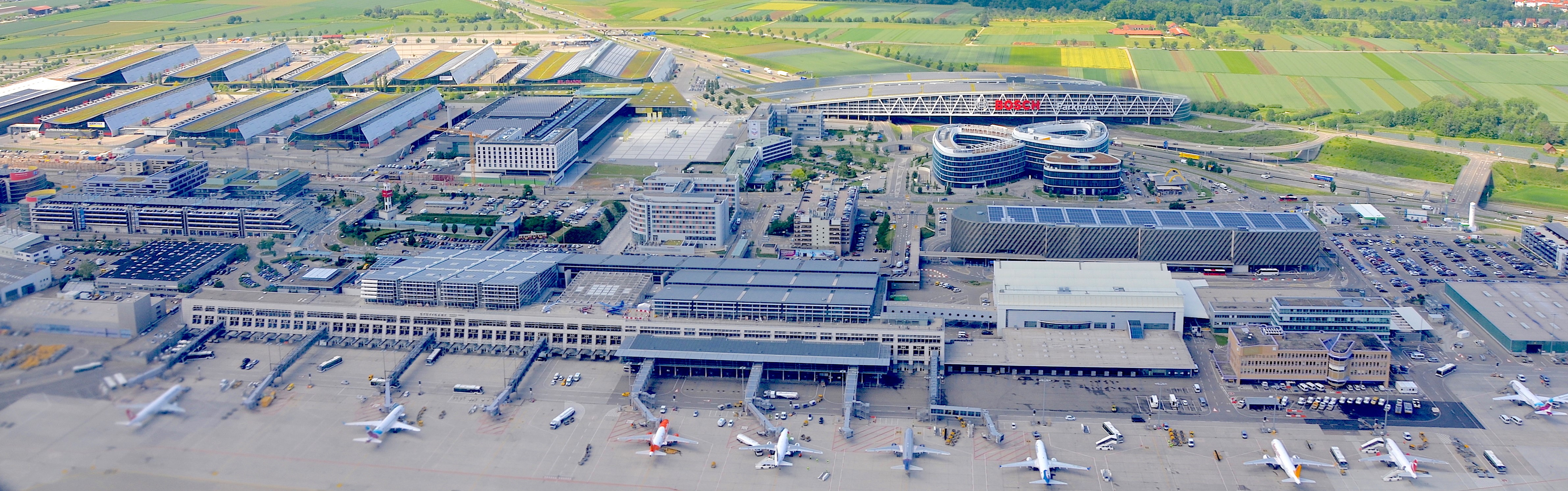
Aerial view of the airport and Stuttgart Trade Fair

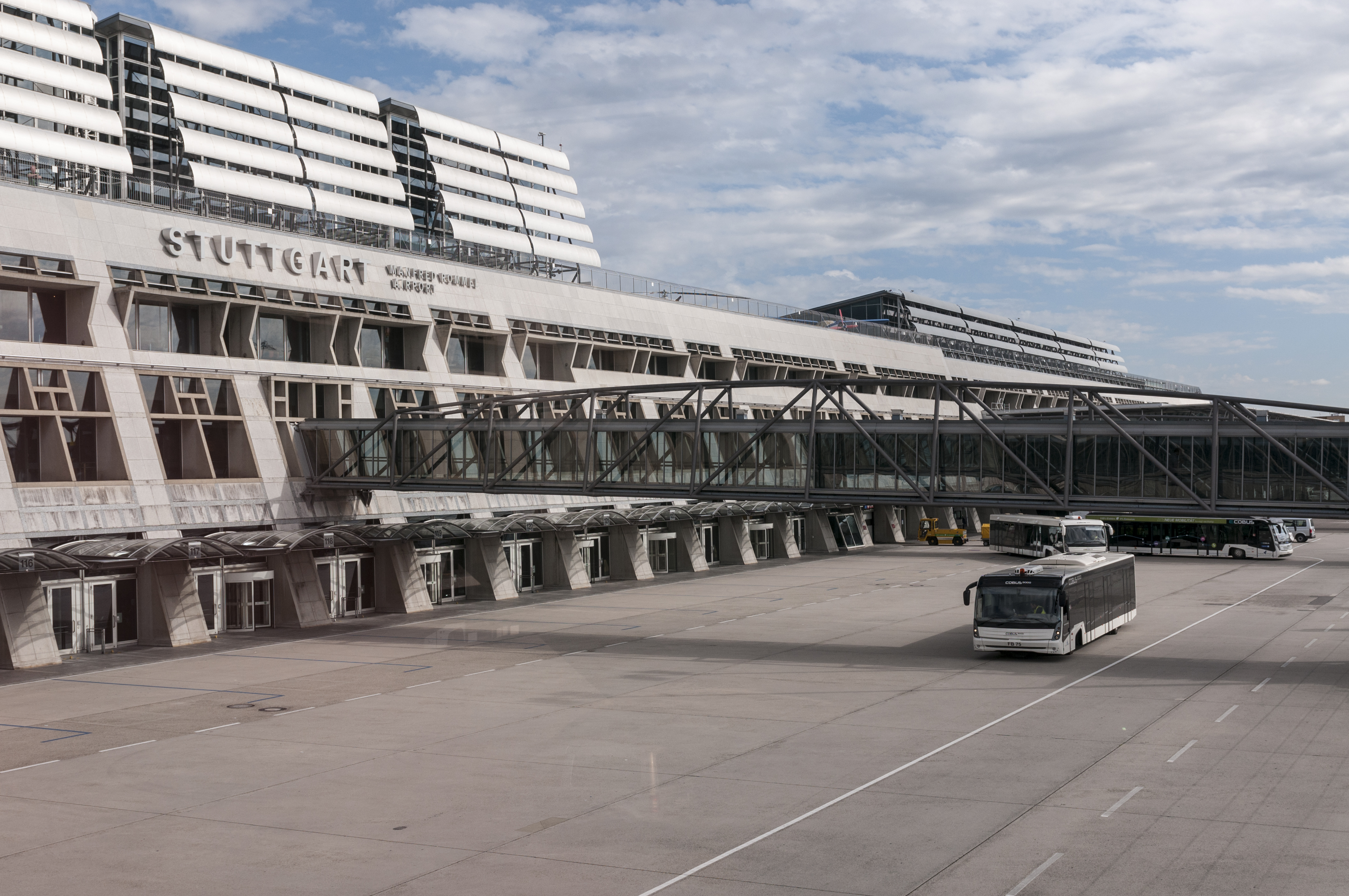
Apron view

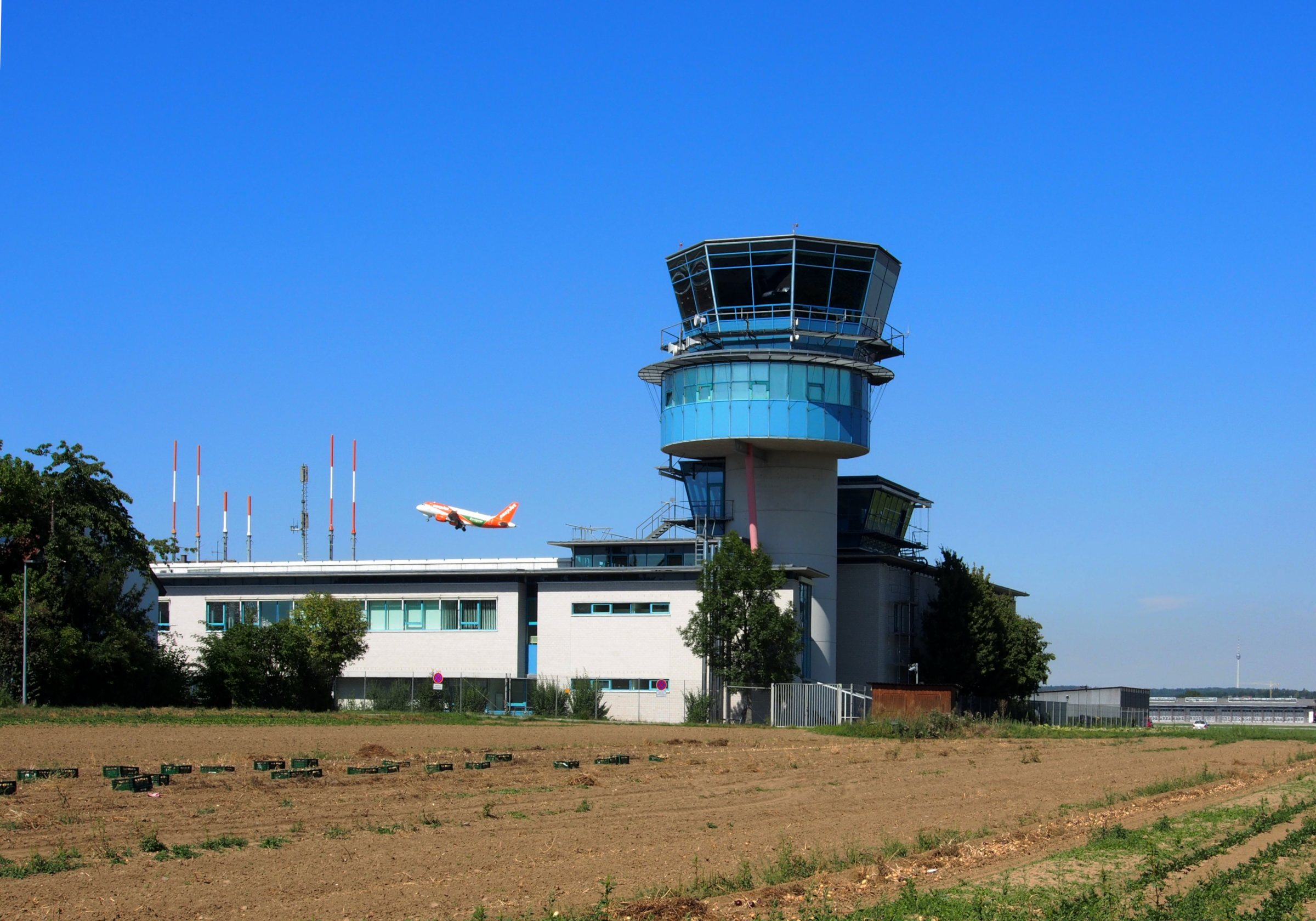
Air traffic control tower

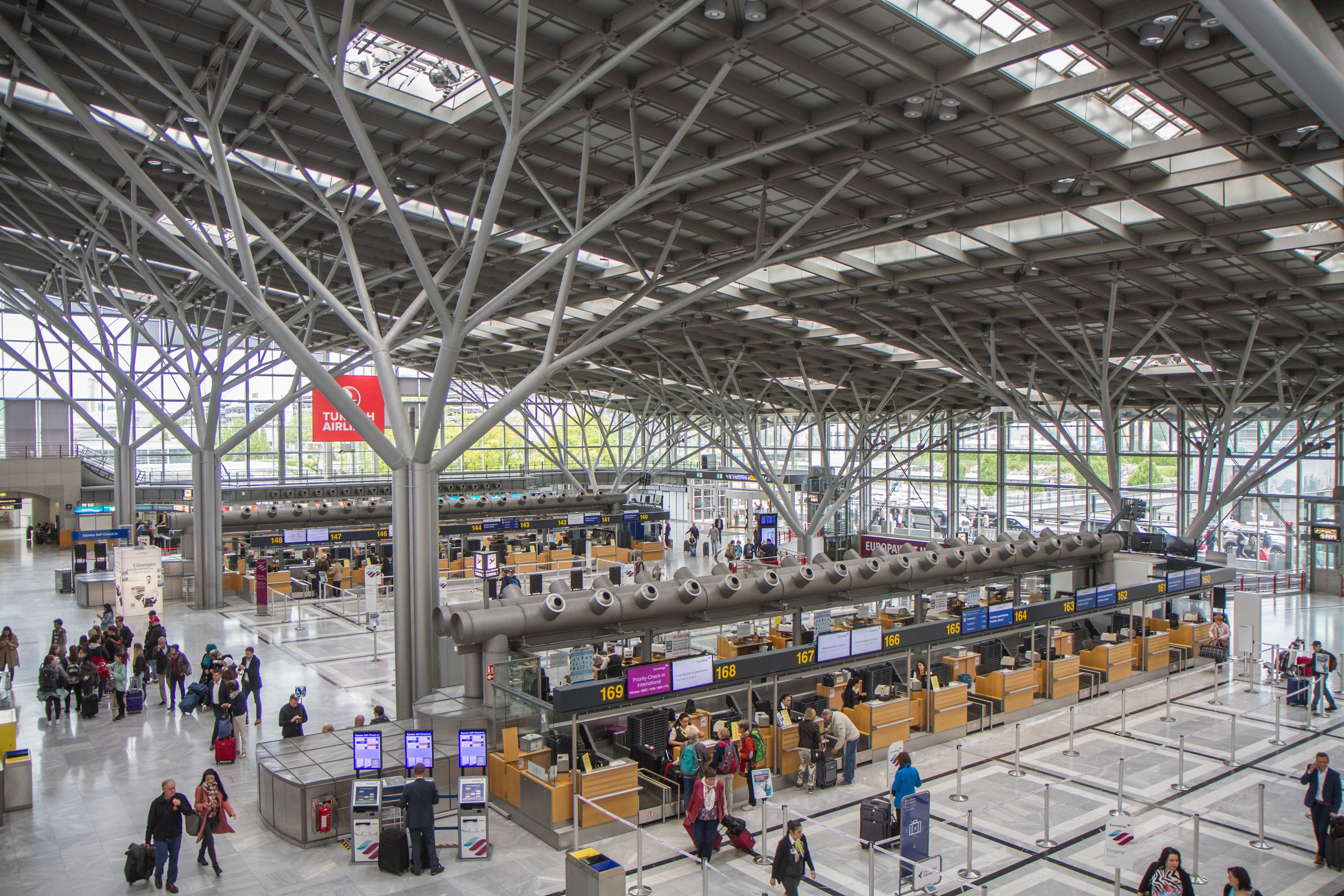
One of the two main halls in Terminal 1

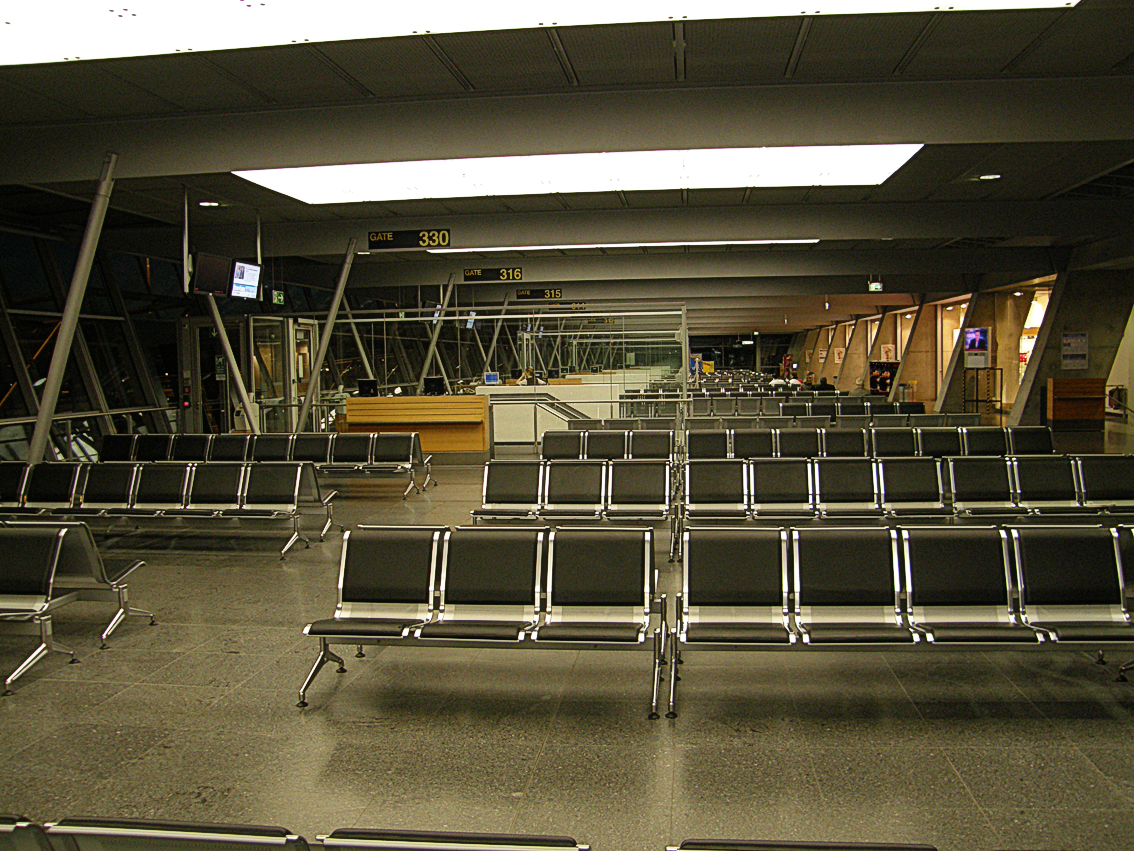
Departure area in Terminal 1

=== Passengers and movements ===
	Passengers	Movements
1999	7,688,951	119,904
2000	▲8,141,020	▲150,451
2001	▼7,642,409	▼146,771
2002	▼7,284,319	▼144,208
2003	▲7,595,286	▲144,903
2004	▲8,831,216	▲156,885
2005	▲9,413,671	▲160,405
2006	▲10,111,346	▲164,735
2007	▲10,328,120	▼164,531
2008	▼9,932,887	▼160,243
2009	▼8,941,990	▼141,572
2010	▲9,226,546	▼135,335
2011	▲9,591,461	▲136,580
2012	▲9,735,087	▼131,524
2013	▼9,588,692	▼124,588
2014	▲9,728,710	▼122,818
2015	▲10,526,920	▲130,485
2016	▲10,640,610	▼129,704
2017	▲10,975,639	▼127,981
2018	▲11,832,634	▲137,632
2019	▲12,721,441	▲
2024	▼9,138,254	▼80,544
Source: Stuttgart Airport

Source: Stuttgart Airport |}

=== Largest airlines ===
Largest airlines by passengers (2023)
Rank	Airline	%
1	Eurowings	40.2%
2	SunExpress	8.0%
3	Turkish Airlines	6.9%
4	TuiFly	6.3%
5	Pegasus Airlines	5.3%
6	Lufthansa	5.1%
7	Condor Flugdienst	4.6%
8	KLM	2.9%
9	Aegan Airlines	2.3%
10	British Airways	2.1%

=== Busiest routes ===
Busiest domestic routes out of Stuttgart Airport (2023)
Rank	Destination	Passengers
1	Berlin, Brandenburg Airport	▼374,500
2	Hamburg, Hamburg Airport	▼357,000
3	Hesse, Frankfurt Airport	▼265,000
4	Bavaria, Munich Airport	▲191,900

Busiest international routes out of Stuttgart Airport (2016)
Rank	Destination	Passengers
1	Spain, Palma de Mallorca Airport	▲730,700
2	Turkey, Istanbul (Atatürk Airport and Sabiha Gökçen Airport)	▼643,500
3	United Kingdom, London (Heathrow Airport, Stansted Airport and Gatwick Airport)	▲520,200
4	Austria, Vienna International Airport	▲367,100
5	Turkey, Antalya Airport	▼363,900
6	Netherlands, Amsterdam Airport	▲311,600
7	Spain, Barcelona Airport	▲239,800
8	Switzerland, Zurich Airport	▼193,800
9	Greece, Athens Airport, Thessaloniki Airport	▼180,000
10	France, Paris Paris–Charles de Gaulle Airport	▼178,700

== Ground transportation ==
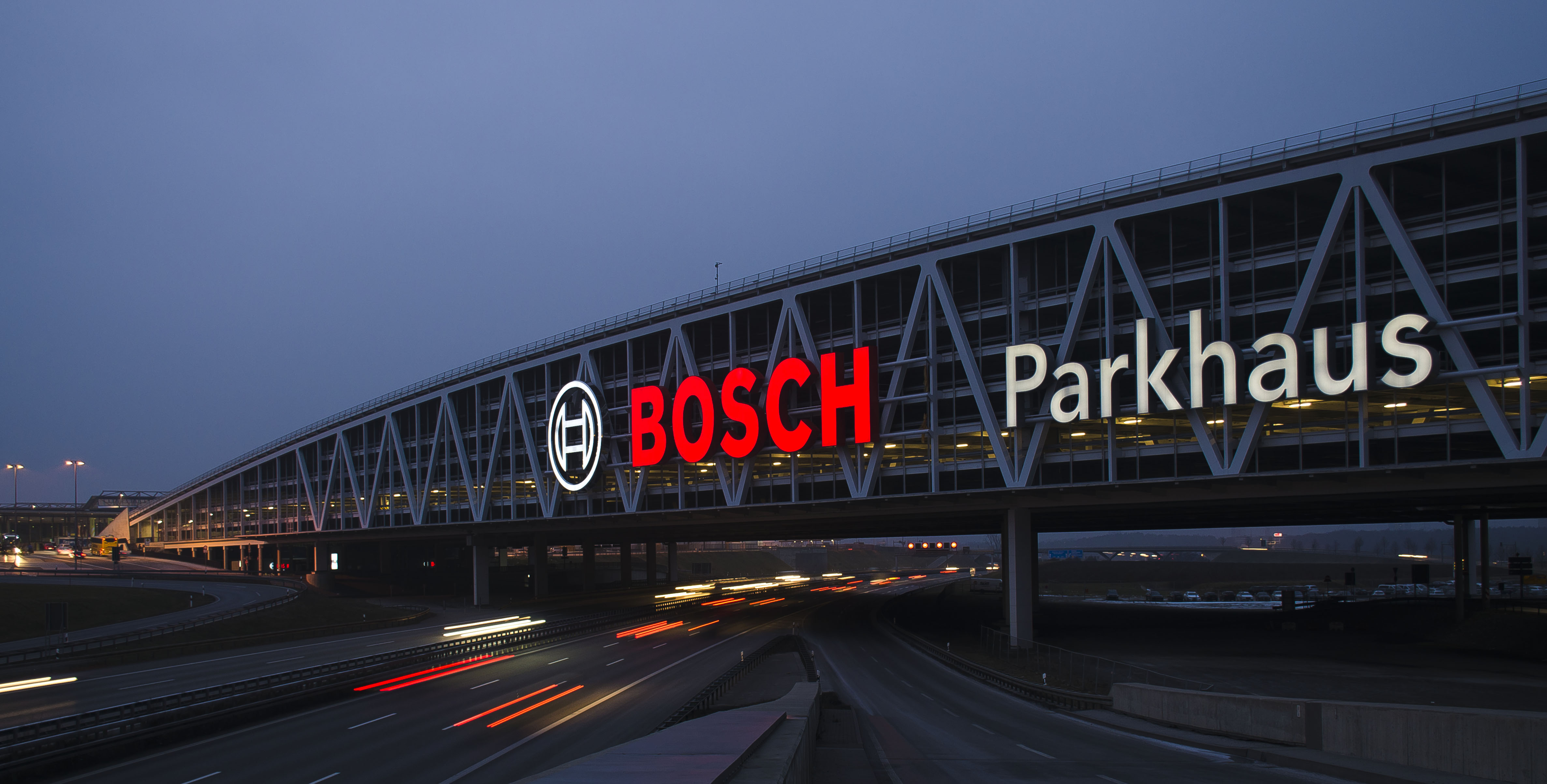
The motorway leading to the airport with a large car park across it

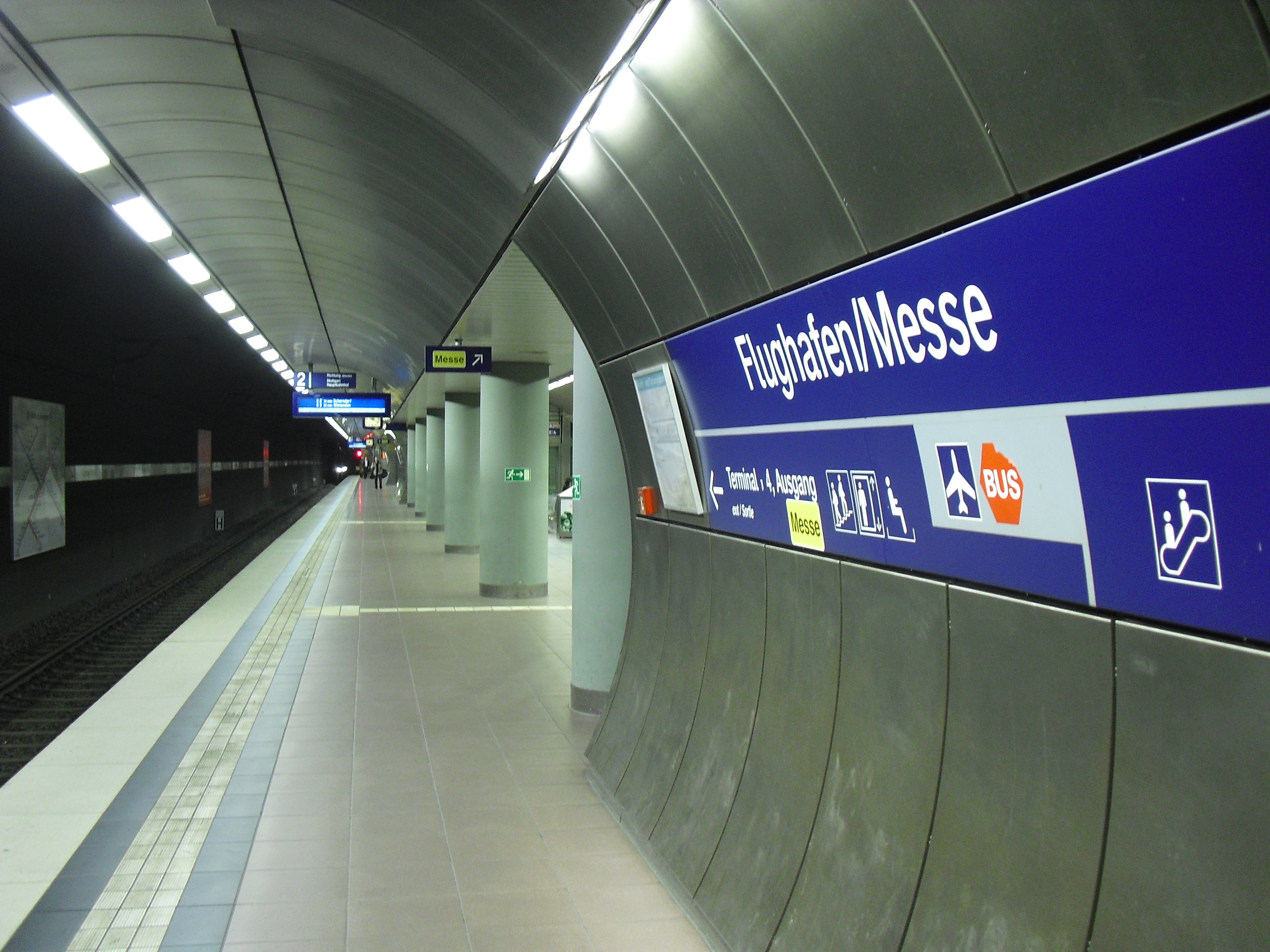
Stuttgart Flughafen/Messe station

=== Car ===
There are two major highways: Just north of the airport runs the Bundesautobahn 8 (A8), which connects the cities of Karlsruhe and Stuttgart to Ulm, Augsburg and Munich. The Bundesstraße 27 (B27) leads to downtown Stuttgart, as well as to Tübingen and Reutlingen in the South.

=== Coach ===
From the regional cities of Esslingen am Neckar, Reutlingen, Tübingen and Kirchheim exists a connection by coach. Additionally, German long-distance coach operators DeinBus and Flixbus maintain their stop for Stuttgart on the airport grounds with direct connections to several major cities.

=== Suburban railway ===
Stuttgart Airport can be easily reached within 30 minutes from the city's main railway station using the Stuttgart suburban railway S2 or S3 from Stuttgart Flughafen/Messe station.

=== Future long-distance railway ===
It is planned to connect the airport with the future Stuttgart - Ulm high-speed railway line currently under construction as part of the major Stuttgart 21 railway redevelopment program. Therefore, a new long-distance train station will be built on the airport's grounds near the existing suburban railway station. The new station, which will be served by ICE high-speed trains will be connected to the new line by an underground loop track. The Stuttgart-Ulm line is scheduled to be opened in 2020. As of 2019, the airport connection is planned to commence operation in late 2025, versus an initial estimate of 2019 (made in 2010).

== Accidents and incidents ==
- On 19 January 2010, Bin Air Swearingen SA-227-C Metro D-CKPP was damaged when the right main undercarriage collapsed on landing.

== See also ==
- Transport in Germany
- List of airports in Germany
