= My Wings =

- Founded: 2020
- Commenced operations: 28 June 2020
- Hubs: Pristina
- Headquarters: Pristina, Kosovo
- Website: Official website

My Wings is a virtual airline of Kosovo based at the Pristina International Airport.

== History ==
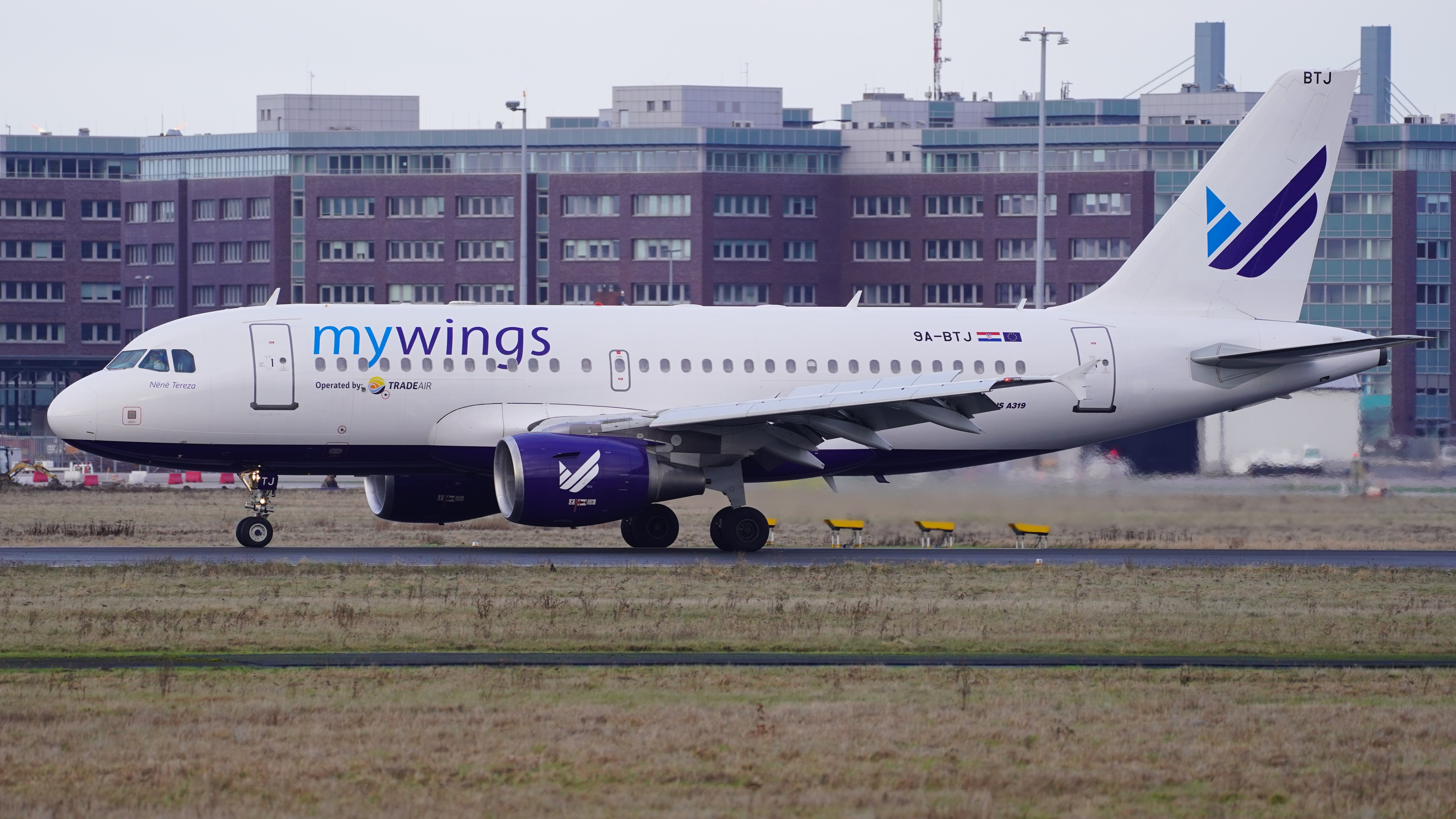
The aircraft of Trade Air operating under My Wings at Bremen Airport. Aircraft was retired in September 2024.

It started operating flights on 28 June 2020, leasing an aircraft from Air Mediterranean. On 22 July 2021, it started operating an Airbus A319 leased by Trade Air.

In October 2021 it was announced that the airline would commence a new three weekly service between Pristina and Zagreb. The operations commenced on 15 December, just to be cancelled a few months later, in 2 February 2022.

In September 2024, Trade Air retired the Airbus A319 aircraft registration number 9A-BTJ that flew under the My Wings airline name.

== Destinations ==
As of December 2025, there are no operations.

== See also ==
- List of airlines of Kosovo
