= Dumosh =

Dumosh Dumoš
- Village
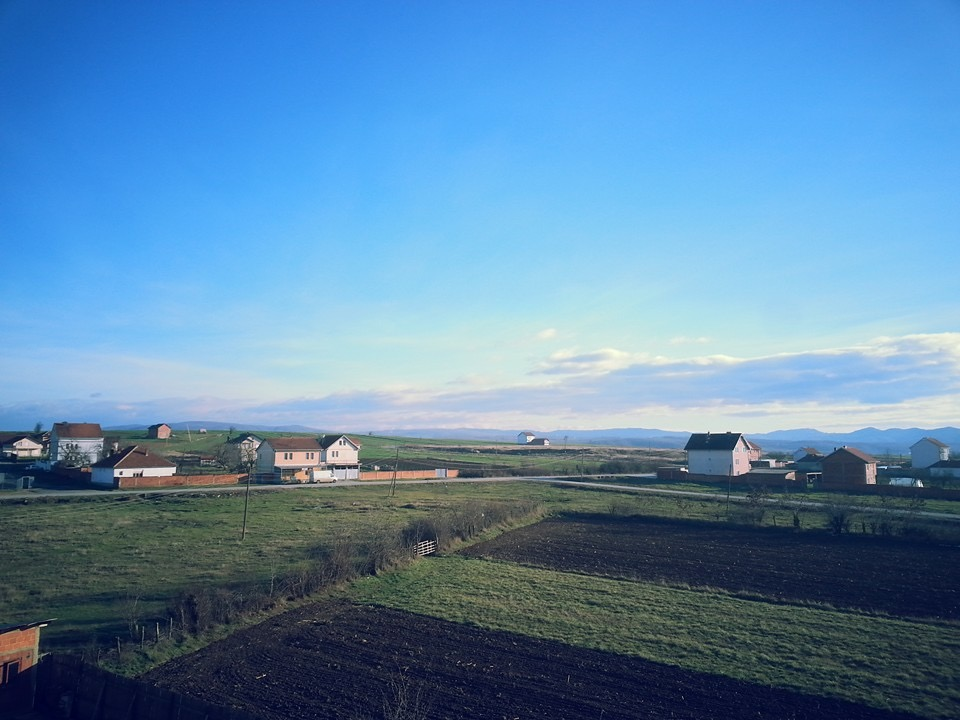

- Location in Kosovo
- Coordinates: 42°51′17″N 21°13′02″E
- Location: Kosovo
- District: Pristina
- Municipality: Podujevë

Population (2024)
  - Total: 791
- Time zone: UTC+1 (Central European Time)
  - Summer (DST): UTC+2 (CEST)

Dumosh (Albanian; or Serbian: Dumoš) is a village located in northeastern Kosovo, in the municipality of Podujevë.

== Demographics ==
The settlement in Dumosh is divided into several "mahalla" (quarters), such as Podvorica, Kutleshi, Maqastena, Visoka etc. The village has a total of 1207 inhabitants.

Year	Population
1948	678
1953	755
1961	794
1971	949
1981	1.078
1991	1.141
2011	1207
2024	791

== Infrastructure ==
The village of Dumosh has a following infrastructure:

- Airport (Dumosh-Batllava Airfield)
- Elementary school (Shkolla fillore Musli Dumoshi)
- 2 grocery stores
- Mosque (Xhamia e Dumoshit)
- Cemetery
- Internet Cafè
- Barber shop
- Bicycle service
- Metalwarehouse
- Soccer (football) field

== Dumosh-Batllava Airfield ==
Dumosh-Batllava Airfield, a Kosovo airport, is a former military airport in the village of Dumosh, near Lake Batllava and the village of Batllava and the city of Podujevë.

In 1936, Aeroput used the airport on the Belgrade-Podujevë-Skopje line using the Aeroput MMS-3 plane. The airport was later rebuilt for military use by the Yugoslav army and air force. It was damaged in 1999 during the NATO bombing of the Federal Republic of Yugoslavia.

== Notable people ==
- Xhavit Bajrami, former Albanian-Swiss K1 kickboxer world champion
- Besnik Podvorica, Basketball player, Kosovo national basketball team and Sigal Prishtina
- Besnik Kutleshi, president and senior squad member of North Sunshine Eagles FC
- Arif Kutleshi, writer and poet

== The tea of "çaj rusi" ==
The most common drink in Podujevë is the tea of "çaj rusi" (the Russian tea) or even "çaj i zi" (the black tea), made from tea produced in either India or Sri Lanka. This kind of tea is said to have been first served in the village of Dumosh. The black tea is said to have originally been brought from the Caucasus by the Circassians who had immigrated to the village since 1865. Oral tradition in the village tells that Sheqir Hajdar Kutleshi was the first in the village to consume the black tea.
