= Georgian Airways Flight 834 =

2011 aviation accident in Democratic Republic of the Congo

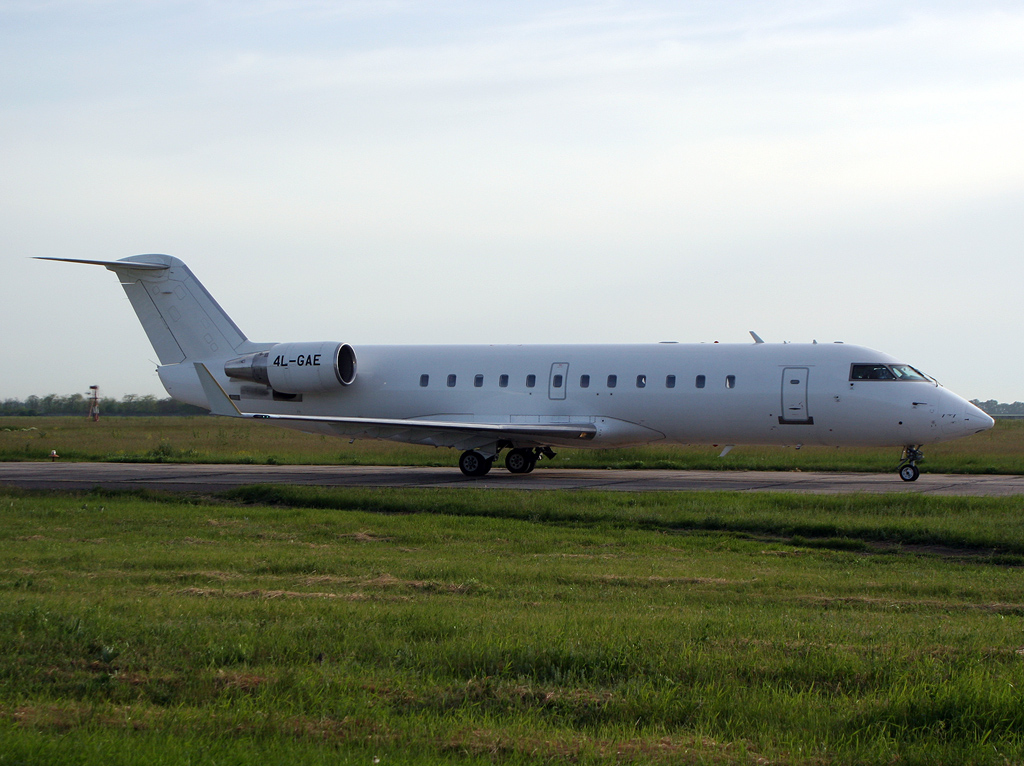
- 4L-GAE, the aircraft involved in the accident

Accident
- Date: 4 April 2011
- Summary: Crashed during landing due to microburst-induced wind shear and pilot error
- Site: N'djili Airport, Democratic Republic of the Congo; 4°22′55″S 15°27′09″E

Aircraft
- Aircraft type: Bombardier CRJ100ER
- Operator: Georgian Airways on behalf of the United Nations
- ICAO flight No.: UNO834
- Call sign: UNO 834
- Registration: 4L-GAE
- Flight origin: Bangoka International Airport, Kisangani, Democratic Republic of the Congo
- Destination: N'djili Airport, Kinshasa, Democratic Republic of the Congo
- Occupants: 33
- Passengers: 29
- Crew: 4
- Fatalities: 32
- Injuries: 1
- Survivors: 1

On 4 April 2011, Georgian Airways Flight 834, a Bombardier CRJ100 passenger jet of Georgian Airways operating a domestic flight from Kisangani to Kinshasa in the Democratic Republic of the Congo (DRC), crashed while attempting to land at Kinshasa Airport. The aircraft, which was chartered by the United Nations, was trying to land during a thunderstorm. Of the 33 people on board, only one person survived. The incident remains the United Nations' deadliest aviation disaster. It is also the third-deadliest air disaster involving the CRJ100/200, behind Comair Flight 5191 and China Eastern Airlines Flight 5210.

The government of the DRC set up an investigation commission to probe the crash. It concluded that the aircraft had encountered a microburst moments after initiating a go-around, causing it to rapidly lose its altitude. Even though the crew's weather radar had depicted severe weather activity around the airport, the crew did not discontinue their flight to Kinshasa. Following the rapid altitude loss, the crew failed to recover the aircraft due to its very low altitude.

== Aircraft ==
The aircraft was a Bombardier CRJ100ER, registered as 4L-GAE with a manufacturer serial number of c/n 7070. On 13 May 2008, under a lease agreement, the aircraft was chartered by the United Nations for its MONUSCO mission in the DRC.

== Accident ==
=== Flight ===
Flight 834 was a domestic passenger flight from Kisangani, the capital of Orientale Province, to the national capital of Kinshasa, operated by the flag carrier of Georgia, Georgian Airways. It was carried out with a Bombardier CRJ100ER, which was chartered by the United Nations for its missions in Congo following the outbreak of conflicts in the area. The flight had been operated by Georgian Airways since 2008. Being chartered by United Nations, it was given the callsign "UNO".

UN flights were frequent in Congo, occurring more than hundreds of times a week as one of the best available means of transportation in the country; the flying route had been one of the most used in the country. Flights operated by United Nations were frequently used to transport journalists and staffs of various non-governmental organizations.

On 4 April 2011, the aircraft was assigned to carry out a flight from Kisangani to Kinshasa. In Kisangani, a total of 29 passengers boarded the aircraft. There were four crew members, consisted of Captain Alexei Hovhanesyan, First Officer Suliko Tsutskiridze, a flight attendant and a ground engineer. All of the crew members were Georgian citizens. The captain was reportedly a Georgian-Armenian. The captain and pilot in command was 27-year-old Alexey Hovhanesyan, who had 2,811 flight hours, including 1,622 hours on the CRJ100 (217 hours as captain and 1,405 as a first officer). He had just been promoted to captain of the CRJ100 approximately three months before the accident. The first officer was 22-year-old Suliko Tsutskiridze, who was far less experienced than Captain Hovhanesyan, having logged only 495 flight hours, with 344 of them on the CRJ100. The other crew members were identified as cabin crew Guram Kepuladze and ground engineer Albert Manukov.

The aircraft took off from Kisangani at 12:18 p.m local time with an estimated time of arrival at 13:55 p.m. The weather briefing for Kinshasa did not indicate any significant development of severe weather for the next two hours.

=== Approach ===
At 13:39 p.m., the crew requested to descend to 10,000 feet (3,000 m) and were later asked to report back after being cleared by the ATC. Following their clearance, they realized that severe weather condition had formed around Kinshasa. Captain Hovhanesyan stated that the aircraft would have to go around the weather system to avoid it. His co-pilot, First Officer Tsutskiridze, decided to observe the developing weather condition.

13:44:39 Captain Hovhanesyan: Damn! Now we will go around this shit!

13:44:43 First Officer Tsutskiridze: Yes, when will we have gone around it.

13:45:07 Hovhanesyan Or we will go around it from here, we will see, by distance

13:45:11 Tsutskiridze: It... I would say... It sees..

13:45:17 Hovhanesyan: What?

13:45:21 Tsutskiridze: This has almost crossed already, this on runway so will cross, We still need to fly for 10 minutes

13:45:45 Tsutskiridze: Check 250... Let's go (*)

13:45:59 Tsutskiridze: Oh, OH! Look how large it is!!!

Tsutkiridze was shocked to see the size of the storm, even could be heard once when he said that the entire ground surface was covered by "magenta" (the radar indication of possible strong thunderstorm activity). The discovery angered both pilots as the weather would complicate their landing attempt. During their conversation on the possible attempts to avoid the weather, personnel in Kinshasa asked the crew to report back on their position. The controller then cleared Flight 834 to conduct a straight-in approach to the localizer of Runway 24 of Kinshasa's N'djili Airport.

Captain Hovhanesyan, still angry with the weather condition in the area, asked his co-pilot to request the latest weather information in Kinshasa. Following their request, the controller in Kinshasa stated that the airport was being pounded with thunderstorm activity with winds at 8 knots (15 km/h; 9.2 mph). The crew later discussed on the possible ways to approach the airport. Meanwhile, the airspeed continued to increase, nearly reaching 250 knots (460 km/h; 290 mph). The aircraft then descended to 3,500 feet (1,100 m). First Officer Tsutskiridze later said that he had seen the runway on one o'clock position. The crew reported back to the tower and the controller wished the crew a good landing.

=== Accident ===
The autopilot was turned off and the aircraft turned towards the runway. The crew configured the aircraft for landing and the passengers and other crews in the cabin were asked to prepare themselves. Approximately 2 nautical miles (3.7 km; 2.3 mi) from the airport, the crew successfully aligned the aircraft with the runway. The aircraft, however, came in at a speed that was above normal, causing the overspeed warning to sound. While the crew was trying to reduce speed, a squall line from the northeast arrived at Kinshasa. Heavy rain began to strike the aircraft. The aircraft continued to descend, passing over the airport's minimum descent altitude. First Officer Tsutkiridze stated that he could not see the runway anymore and suggested Captain Hovhanesyan go around, to which he agreed.

13:56:30 Tsutskiridze: No. Nothing in sight. Let's go around!

13:56:32 Hovhanesyan: Go-around, flaps 8.

13:56:33 Tsutskiridze: Okay.

13:56:34 Tsutskiridze: Flaps 8.

13:56:38 Tsutskiridze: United Nations 834, going around.

The aircraft's nose was pitched up and its altitude began to increase. During the climb, the rain suddenly intensified as the aircraft was struck by a microburst. The wind shear warning blared inside the cockpit and the nose started to pitch downwards at an angle of 7 degrees in a matter of seconds. Hovhanesyan ordered Tsutkiridze to retract the flaps; however, the aircraft continued to lose altitude. Before the crew managed to perform any recovery actions, their altitude was already too low.

13:56:45 Tsutskiridze: Damn it!!!

13:56:48 Aircraft warning : Wind shear! Wind shear! Wind shear!

13:56:49 Hovhanesyan: Flaps up!

13:56:49 Aircraft warning: Wind shear! Whoop whoop pull up!

13:56:50 Tsutskiridze: Okay! Flaps up!

13:56:52 Tsutskiridze: C'mon! Speed!! Speed!!! a-a....

The aircraft flew across the runway and slammed onto the ground to the left of N'djili Airport's Runway 24, shortly before 14:00 local time (13:00 UTC), at a speed of 180 knots (330 km/h; 210 mph) with 10 degree nose down. The undercarriage immediately separated and the aircraft skidded across the ground before it finally flipped over. During the process, various parts of the aircraft began to shear off, including the tail. It continued to slide and eventually came to rest at a distance of 400 metres (1,300 ft; 440 yd) from its initial impact point.

A total of nine people were extricated alive from the wreckage. However, several survivors were pronounced dead on arrival and the others succumbed to their injuries. The sole survivor was Francis Mwamba, a Congolese journalist. He was seriously injured with a reported spinal fracture. Due to the severity of his injuries, he was flown to South Africa for further treatment.

== Passengers ==
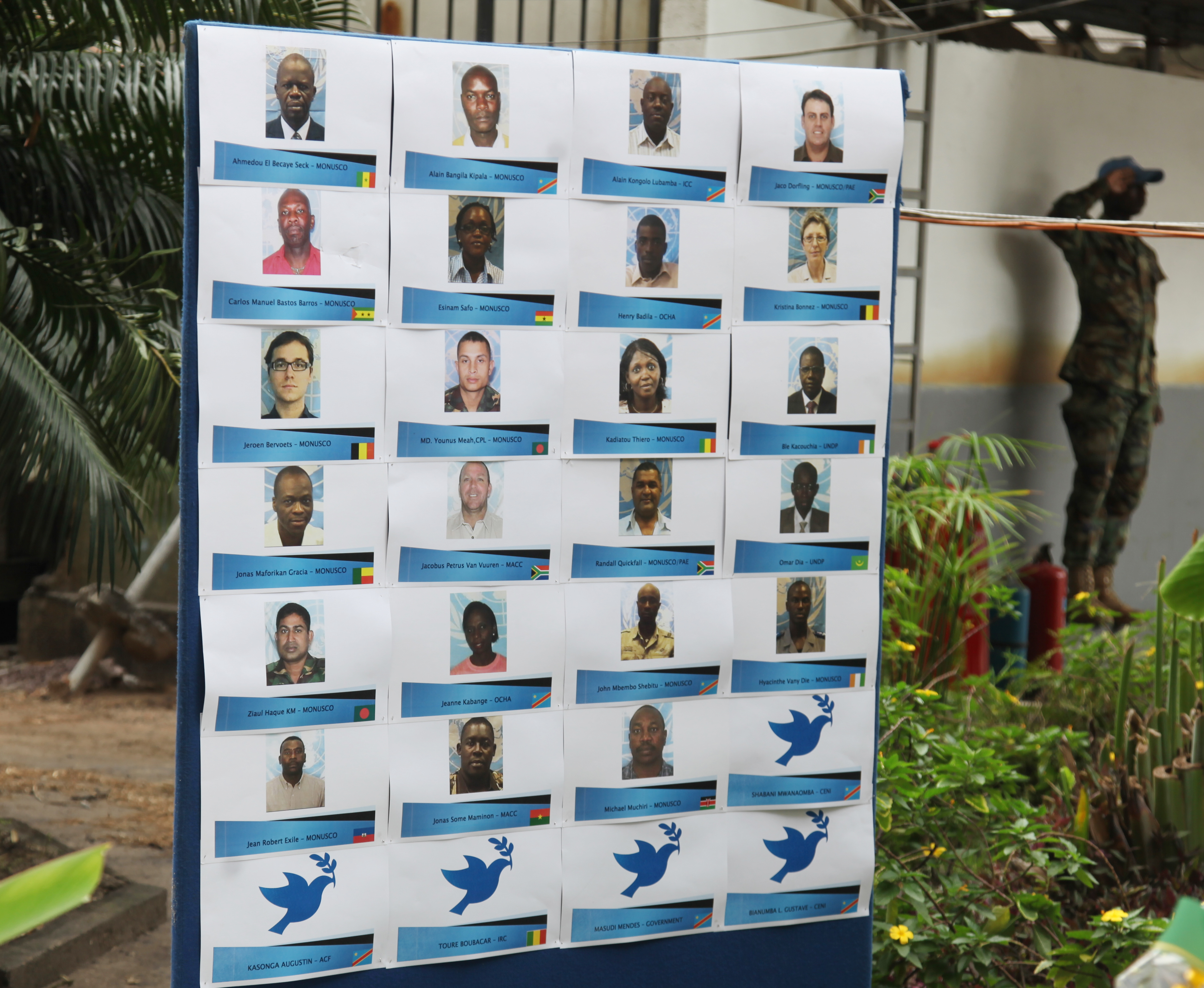
Board with photos of victims of the crash. Crew members are not included.

The majority of those on board Flight 834 were staff from the United Nations. The aircraft manifest listed 20 UN workers. The passengers included UN peacekeepers and officials, humanitarian workers and electoral assistants. The official UN news bulletin reported that 14 of the passengers were members of MONUSCO. Others were from various UN entities, such as the United Nations Development Programme (UNDP), UN Office for the Coordination of Humanitarian Affairs (OCHA), World Food Programme (WFP), and United Nations Office for Project Services (UNOPS). Five non-UN passengers were staff from non-governmental organizations in the Democratic Republic of the Congo or from other international organizations. UN reported that the non-UN passengers of Flight 834 were staffs from the DRC government, Congolese electoral commission, International Criminal Court, International Rescue Committee and Pacific Architects and Engineers.

Officials confirmed that the passengers were from 14 nationalities, including Congolese, South Africans, Bangladeshi, Belgians, Ivorians, Malians, Ghanaian, Beninese, Burkinabe, Haitian, Kenyan, Mauritanian, Santomean and Senegalese.

Among the passengers was Mendes Masudi, an official adviser to the Foreign Minister of the DRC.

Nationality	Fatalities		Total
Nationality	Passengers	Crew	Total
Democratic Republic of the Congo	9	0	9
Georgia	0	4	4
South Africa	3	0	3
Bangladesh	2	0	2
Belgium	2	0	2
Cote d'Ivoire	2	0	2
Mali	2	0	2
Benin	1	0	1
Burkina Faso	1	0	1
Ghana	1	0	1
Haiti	1	0	1
Kenya	1	0	1
Mauritania	1	0	1
São Tomé and Príncipe	1	0	1
Senegal	1	0	1
Total Fatalities:			32

== Response ==
UN mission in Congo immediately established a task force to investigate the accident. Counsellors were provided and a hotline was established for the relatives of the victims. Then-head of MONUSCO, Roger Meece, visited the crash site in N'djili Airport along with other senior UN officials from MONUSCO. He expressed his shock for the extent of damage of the crash.

The UN Security Council, United Kingdom and the United States have offered their condolences for the accident. UN Secretary-General Ban Ki-moon also issued a letter containing his sorrow of the crash and the other recent deadly incidents involving UN staff in Afghanistan, Ivory Coast and Haiti. In response to the crash, a wreath-laying ceremony was to be held in New York's UN headquarters. Flags of the UN were to be flown at half-mast in every UN offices around the world.

== Investigation ==
=== Severe weather ===
The METAR in force at the time showed thunder showers and rain. (Note: The METAR in force at the time was FZAA 041300Z 18020KT 0500 +TSRA SCT022 SCT028CB BKN110 28/22 Q1008 CB SECT NE-E-SE-W BECMG 1500/. This translates as METAR for N'djili Airport, issued on 4 April at 13:00 Zulu time. Winds from 180° at 20 knots (37 km/h; 23 mph; 10 m/s). Visibility 500 metres (1,600 ft; 550 yd). Thunderstorms and heavy rain showers (greater than 7.6 mm/h). Scattered (cumulative 3/8 of sky covered) clouds at 2,200 feet (670 m), Scattered (cumulative total now 4/8) thunderclouds at 2,800 feet (850 m), broken (cumulative total between 5/8 to 7/8) clouds at 11,000 feet (3,400 m). Temperature 28 °C (82 °F), dew point 22 °C (72 °F), QNH 1008 hPa, thunderstorms to north east, east, south east and west of airport, visibility expected to improve to 1,500 metres (1,600 yd).) According to a United Nations official, the aircraft "landed heavily, broke into two and caught fire". An eyewitness suggested windshear as a cause. Alain Le Roy, the Under-Secretary-General for Peacekeeping Operations, indicated that the poor weather was a key element in the cause of the crash.

Radar visuals on the weather at Kinshasa confirmed the presence of inclement conditions in the area at the time of the crash. The depicted squall line was described as severe and fast-moving with very low cloud base. Moving with a speed of 40 to 50 km/h (22 to 27 kn; 25 to 31 mph) from the northeast to the southwest, the system grew in size when it reached Kinshasa. The fast-moving nature of the weather system was the reason for the rapid visibility deterioration in Kinshasa, where in just 10 minutes the visibility had largely dropped from 8,000 metres (26,000 ft) to just 500 metres (1,600 ft). A significant increase in wind speed was also noted. The weather system deepened and eventually grew in size. This was also confirmed by the cockpit recording in which First Officer Tsutkiridze expressed his shock at the large coverage of the weather system. Imagery from the area showed the colour "magenta", which indicated possible strong thunderstorm activity.

Kinshasa's N'djili Airport was not provided with a weather radar, so the radar controller could not predict or relay information on the rapidly unfolding severe weather conditions to the crew of Flight 834. Despite this, Air Traffic Control (ATC) had warned the crew on the prevailing weather conditions at the airport with "Thunderstorm over the station", though the observance of squall line was not reported. However, the warning seems to have been ignored by the crew possibly due to the ATC personnel's slight accent.

Due to the size of the storm, the crew had to go around it. As a result, the crew were unable to intercept the airport's localizer and to maintain their aircraft within the localizer path. They eventually managed to intercept the localizer at a distance of two nautical miles from the airport. The deteriorating visibility prompted the crew to execute a go-around but the squall line then produced microbursts with vertical gusts of up to 40–50 feet per second (12–15 m/s). Data from the FDR corroborated this finding; vertical G fluctuations and yaw damper movements were recorded on the device.

=== Decision to land ===
The onboard cockpit radar and the updated weather condition from the ATC had provided sufficient information to the crew regarding the weather conditions at their destination airport. The appropriate procedure to the presence of severe weather in the area around Kinshasa was to avoid attempting a landing. The crew, however, decided to continue their approach. There had been doubts cast by the crew on the weather depiction on their radar, but even when they realized that the weather had indeed deteriorated throughout Kinshasa, they kept hoping that the weather would improve. This was caused by the imagery on their radar, which showed the air mass moving away from the airport.

The crew, believing that the airport would later be cleared of clouds, decided to continue their approach to Kinshasa. Their intention to land later became firmer as First Officer Tsutkiridze obtained visual contact with the runway, which was on the right side of the aircraft. He then asked Captain Hovhanesyan to turn the aircraft to the right, but the captain did not make such input, as he had not sighted the runway. The first officer then tried to convince the captain by pointing the direction of the runway and adding that "there was nothing there" (no significant weather phenomenon compared to the other area) and thus it was safer for them to fly there. Captain Hovhanesyan later saw the runway as well and prepared the aircraft for landing.

Their decision to land, despite the adverse weather condition and their high airspeed, was described as inappropriate. According to the investigation, the crew might have had faced a "situation overload", which eventually decreased their ability to make decisions correctly.

=== Procedural deviations ===
Other than the inappropriate decision that had been made by the crew, investigators also noted multiple procedural deviations during the entirety of the flight. Among those deviations were crew commencing their descent below 10,000 ft at a speed above normal, configuring the aircraft for a landing attempt at an altitude below the minimum descent altitude, no landing checklist callout, no reporting short on final as requested by ATC, continuing approach below minimum descent altitude during adverse weather conditions, non-adherence to weather avoidance procedure and numerous other procedural deviations.

The crew had flown in the DRC for an extended period of time without any kind of supervision from Georgian Airways, MONUSCO, Georgian and DRC civil aviation administration regarding their flight conduct. Due to this lack of supervision, the crew believed that their deviations from flight manual would not be discovered by their supervisors. While Georgian Airways had adopted a Flight Operations Quality Assurance (FOQA) program, the airline had not followed said policy for the CRJ100 fleet. This lack of management supervision enabled the crew to deviate from the approved procedures.

=== Conduct of go-around ===
As the crew decided to go around, the thrust was not increased to the required level. The nose attitude was not in a sufficiently upwards position for a recovery, being set at 8 degrees, and the aircraft's landing gear was not retracted. Due to the low altitude of the aircraft, according to investigators the crew would have needed a much more higher setting of the thrust lever (at fully forward position) and the landing gear should have been retracted for better aerodynamics. The nose pitch should have been raised to 10 degrees. As such, the crew would have had a better chance to recover from the microburst, albeit small.

The analysis from the recordings raised questions on whether the pilots had pressed the take-off go-around (TOGA) button during the go-around phase. This was due to the insufficient pitch attitude of the aircraft during the phase. The investigation noted that Captain Hovhanesyan, who was the pilot flying, had undergone simulator training only once for his upgrade to the CRJ100, which was deemed inadequate. He had recently been promoted to captain for the CRJ100 in December 2010. Prior to the captain's promotion, he had been flying as a first officer in a Boeing 737 for several years. The location of the TOGA button in the Boeing 737 is very different from that of the CRJ100. On the Boeing 737, the button is located forward, adjacent to the thrust lever. To engage the TOGA button, the crew would push the button with the index finger. On the CRJ100, the button is located on the side of the throttle lever, so the crew would have to push it with the thumb sideways towards the lever. Due to lack of training, the captain possibly did not push the TOGA button with his thumb due to his habit with the previous aircraft type.

By pressing the TOGA button, a command bar for the 10 degree reference indication would have appeared on the aircraft's flight director, and the pilots would have been able to notice it. Due to the non-activation of the TOGA, the reference 10 degree reference did not appear, and thus the pitch attitude was not raised. On the CRJ100, the command bar would have also appeared during the activation of the windshear warning. However, due to the low altitude and the strong force of the microburst, there was barely any time left for the crew to react.

=== Oversight failure ===
The lack of simulator training that the captain received from Georgian Airways was attributed to the failure of the training program and oversight from the Georgian Civil Aviation Administration (CAA). The syllabus from Georgian Airways had only required promoted pilots to undergo simulator training once before their respective line-oriented flight training. This was peculiar as, according to the investigation, such a practice was not used in other countries around the world. For a recently promoted captain, the norm in many airlines is to conduct 8 to 10 simulator trainings, particularly for the CRJ fleet.

As a regulatory body for civil aviation in Georgia, the CAA should have reviewed the training program of Georgian Airways. The investigation stated that there were definite lapses in the oversight function of the CAA, as Georgian Airways was allowed to use such skimpy training. The CAA, however, insisted that such syllabus actually conformed to ICAO standards and as such stated that it could not be included as one of the contributing factors to the crash, although they admitted that more training in areas regarding severe weather conditions and "inadequate meteorological capabilities" were needed.

=== Other deficiencies ===
Kinshasa's ATC personnel who was on duty at the time of the crash was also noted for deficiencies. The ATC kept referring the latest weather update as "NOSIG". The term NOSIG was an abbreviation from "no significant", implying that no significant weather change was observed on the radar for the next 30 minutes. During the accident flight, the weather rapidly deteriorated in mere minutes but the ATC personnel kept relaying the term NOSIG to the crew. The rapidly changing weather eventually caused the visibility over the airport to deteriorate. As the visibility dropped to below the minimum of 2,400 meters, the ATC personnel should have closed the airport. Had the airport been closed, Flight 834 would not have continued their approach to Kinshasa.

The team from the CAA added that there were several other deficiencies from the ATC. According to the findings that had been gathered by the team, the crew had repeatedly tried to contact the ATC for the updated weather situation, but the ATC did not respond until a few minutes after the transmission. When contact was established between the ATC and the crew, the weather information was still not available. The updated weather report was eventually received by the crew, approximately one second before the crash. The ATC should have received the alert weather analysis from meteorological services and immediately contacted the crew on the weather conditions and also advised the crew on possible diversion. None of these actions were performed.

=== Final report ===
An investigation from the Permanent Office of Investigations of Aviation Accidents/Incidents of the DRC Ministry of Transport and Channels of Communication listed the probable cause of the accident as follow:

The most probable cause of the accident was Flight 834's encounter with a severe microburst-like weather phenomenon at a very low altitude during the process of go-around. The severe vertical gust/downdraft caused a significant and sudden pitch change to the aircraft which resulted in a considerable loss of height. Being at very low altitude, recovery from such a disturbance was not possible.

— Permanent Office of Investigations of Aviation Accidents/Incidents"

A total of 13 recommendations were issued by the investigation team. Among the recommendations, the Congolese Ministry of Transport was asked to provide appropriate equipment for meteorological services in the DRC to provide better services. The DRC Civil Aviation Administration was ordered to immediately implement effective oversight on all airliners in the country and Georgian Airways was asked to revise their training program.

=== Differing view from Georgian counterpart ===
Despite the findings that had been listed by the Congolese investigators, the Georgian CAA disputed several of the findings and asked clarifications on the content of the report. For instance, several statements were regarded as "devoid of objective analysis" pertinent to the situation and findings from Georgian CAA were included but not explained thoroughly, including the ATC's contributing factor to the crash.

The go-around phase was particularly noted by the CAA. According to the report, the crew didn't carry out the approach of the flight in accordance with the approved procedure. The CAA, however, stated that such statement was misleading as it didn't fully reflect the analysis of the crew's action during the flight. As inclement weather condition was prevailing in Kinshasa at the time, the flight operation manual actually recommended the crew to maintain higher airspeed than normal. Due to the crew's decision to avoid the weather system in the area, the crew were forced to delay configuring their aircraft.

The thrust setting that was applied by the crew at the time of the crash was just 1.8% lower than the recommended 92% thrust setting for a go-around procedure. This deviation was described as "insignificant", and, as the aircraft was struck by turbulence at the time, such precise setting of 92% thrust was deemed to be highly unlikely. Discussion with Bombardier also revealed that, even though the thrust was lower than the recommended thrust setting and the extended position of the landing gear, the aircraft was still able to perform a successful go-around. The Congolese investigation team, however, assumed that higher thrust setting would have improved the pilots' chances of avoiding the accident. This was seen as irrelevant by the Georgian counterpart.

The extended position of the landing gear and the non-activation of the TOGA button was also disputed by CAA. According to the CAA, the landing gear was still in extended position because the crew had not obtained the stabilized positive climb rate, which was technically in conformance with the approved flight manual. In light of the TOGA button finding, the CAA stated that the recorded behaviour on the aircraft showed more evidence that the TOGA button had actually been activated by the crew.

The Georgian CAA insisted that the accident was mainly caused by the severe weather condition in the area, the crew's decision to continue their flight despite the prevailing bad weather and the ATC's failure to inform the crew on the deteriorating weather condition in Kinshasa.

== See also ==
- 1961 Ndola United Nations DC-6 crash
- Bhoja Air Flight 213
- List of accidents and incidents involving airliners by location
- Si Fly Flight 3275
