= Gjakova Airport =

Airport serving Gjakova, Kosovo

Gjakova Airport Aeroporti i Gjakovës Aerodrom Đakovica
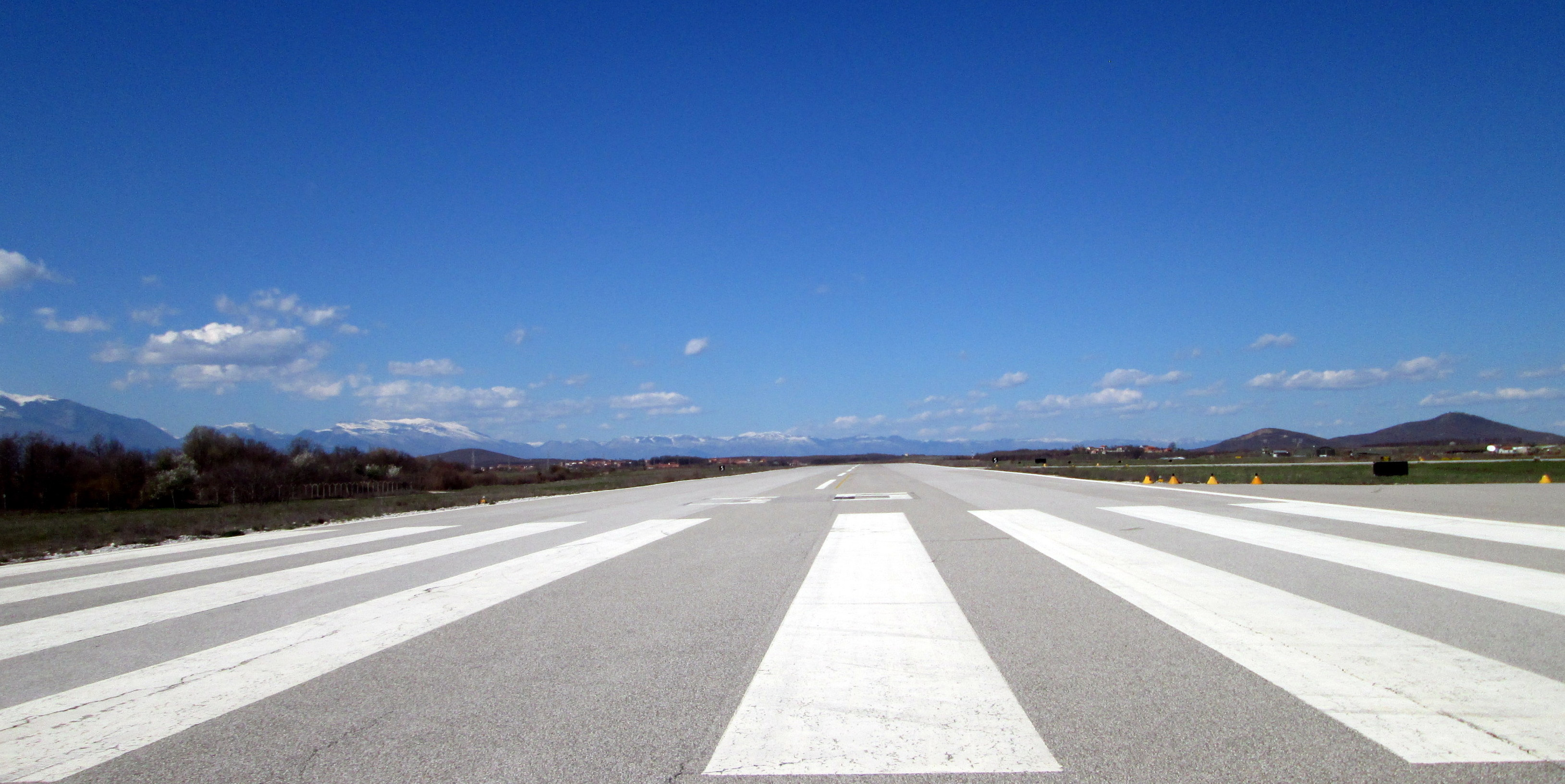
- IATA: none; ICAO: LYDK

Summary
- Airport type: Military
- Owner: Ministry of Defence of Kosovo
- Operator: Kosovo Security Force
- Serves: Gjakova
- Location: Lugbunar, Kosovo
- Elevation AMSL: 1,370 ft (420 m)
- Coordinates: 42°26′07″N 020°25′39″E

Map
- Location of airport in Kosovo

Runways
| Direction | Length | | Surface |
| Direction | ft | m | Surface |
|---|---|---|---|
| 17/35 | 5,904 | 1,800 | Asphalt |
- Source: DAFIF

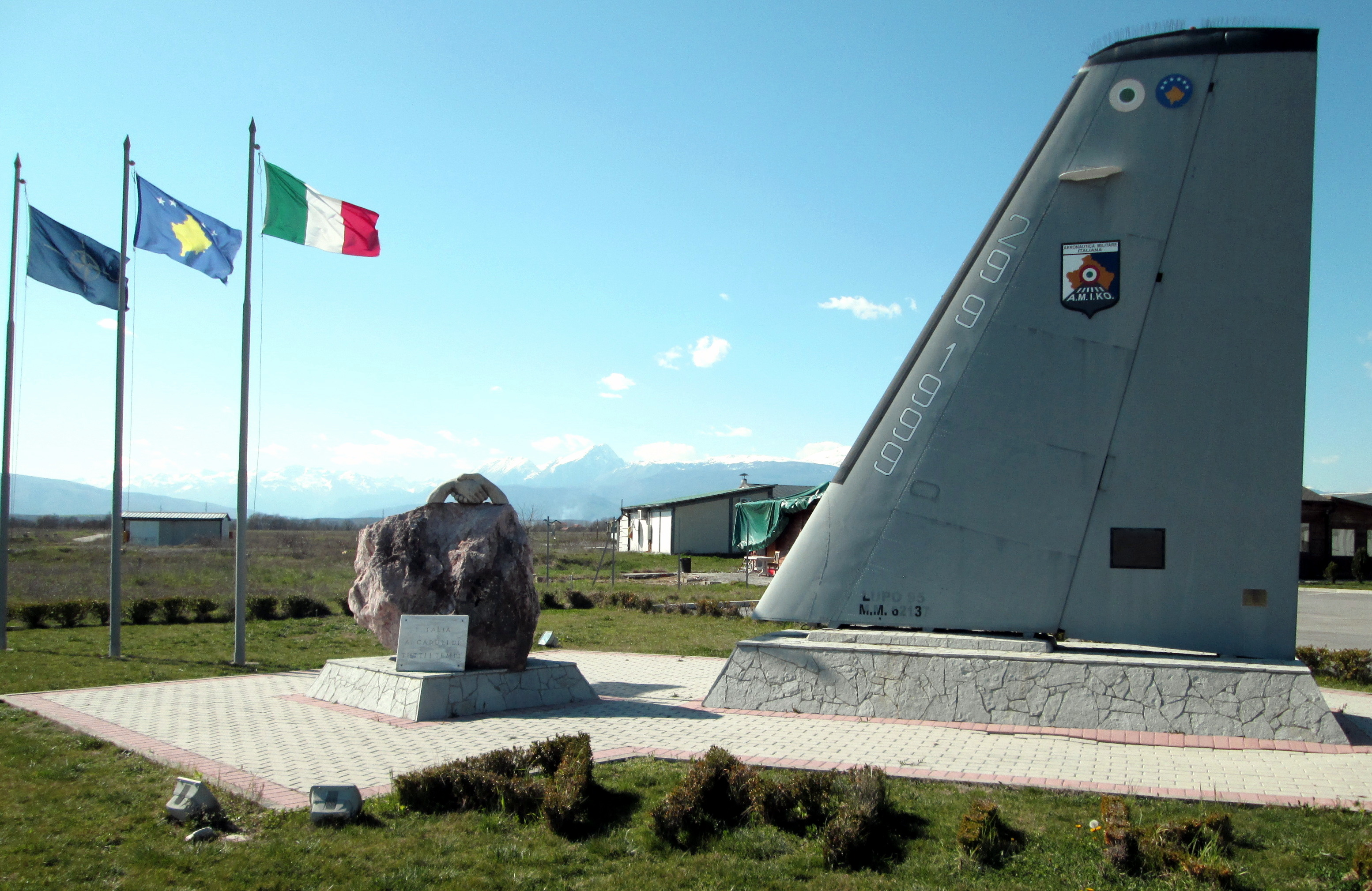
Memorial to the first flight to land at Gjakova Airport on 23 September 1999, an Italian Airforce G 222

Gjakova Airport AMIKO (Albanian: Aeroporti i Gjakovës, Serbian: Аеродром Ђаковица/Aerodrom Đakovica) is an airport in the village Lugbunar, near Gjakova in western Kosovo. The airport is currently in military use by the Kosovo Security Force. The possibility for the airport to serve a dual civilian-military use has also been mentioned. In that scenario, the airport would host low-cost commercial airlines and cargo flights. However, such plans by the Kosovo government are difficult to implement due to the contract with “Limak & Aeroport de Lyon,” which does not allow for competition to the Pristina International Airport until 2030.

== History ==
The airport was built by the Kosovo Force (KFOR) following the 1999 Kosovo War, next to an existing airfield used for agricultural purposes, and was used mainly for military and humanitarian flights. On 18 December 2013, the airport was handed over to the Government of Kosovo from the Italian Air Force. Under Italian Air Force operations, Gjakova Airfield handled more than 27,000 aircraft, 220,000 passengers and the carriage of more than 40,000 tons of cargo.

After its transfer to the Kosovo authorities, the Kosovo government planned to turn the Gjakova Airport into a civilian and commercial airport and established the "Gjakova Airport" public enterprise in 2014. The airport was audited by the Civil aviation authority of Kosovo in 2016, and the report concluded that the airport had the necessary infrastructure to serve commercial flights.

In 2018 the Kosovo Government transferred the Gjakova Airport to the Kosovo Ministry Defense for the purpose of it being used by the Kosovo Security Force. The airport was renovated in 2021 and 2022 by the Ministry of Defense and its perimeter defenses were upgraded.

== See also ==
- Alenia C-27J Spartan
- Radoniq lake
- Dumosh-Batllava Airfield
