= Besnik Podvorica =

Kosovo Albanian basketball player

Besnik Podvorica (born 25 May 1986 in Dumosh), is a Kosovo Albanian former professional basketball player who played most of the time for Sigal Prishtina in Kosovo Superleague.

== Career ==
Born in Dumosh, Podvorica played for Prishtina. In 2014, he also played for RTV21 and Kastrioti before ending his career.
