= Bin Air =

German charter airline

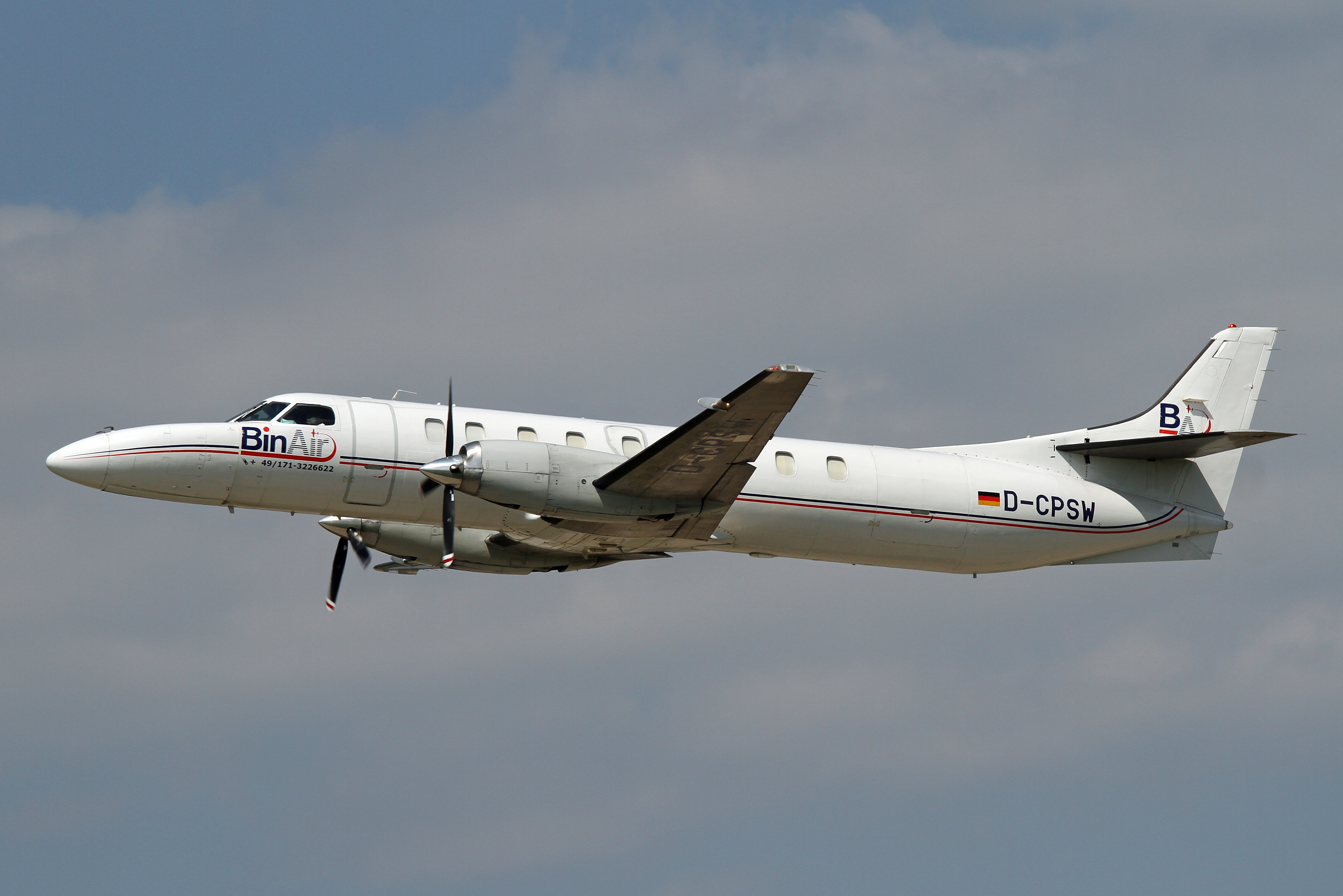
- Fairchild Swearingen Metroliner
IATA	ICAO	Call sign
—	BID	BINAIR
- Founded: 1996
- Hubs: Essen/Mülheim Airport
- Fleet size: 5
- Destinations: charter
- Headquarters: Munich, Germany
- Website: binair.eu

BinAir Aero Service GmbH is a German charter airline headquartered in Munich and based out of Essen/Mülheim Airport specializing in ad hoc freight services across Europe.

== History ==
The airline was founded in 1996.

The European Union warned the airline in 2011 to improve its safety or face inclusion in the EU no-flight blacklist of banned airlines. As of 29 October 2018, Bin Air's air operator's certificate had been revoked by the Luftfahrtbundesamt forcing the airline to cease all operations. It eventually regained its license in December 2020.

== Accidents and incidents ==
1. On 19 January 2010, a Bin Air Swearingen SA-227-DC Metro was damaged when the right main undercarriage collapsed on landing at Stuttgart Airport.
2. On 7 March 2013, a Bin Air Swearingen SA-227-DC Metro was responsible for the closure of Dublin Airport's main runway for around 35 minutes when its forward retracting nose wheel collapsed during landing.
