= Si Fly Flight 3275 =

1999 aviation accident

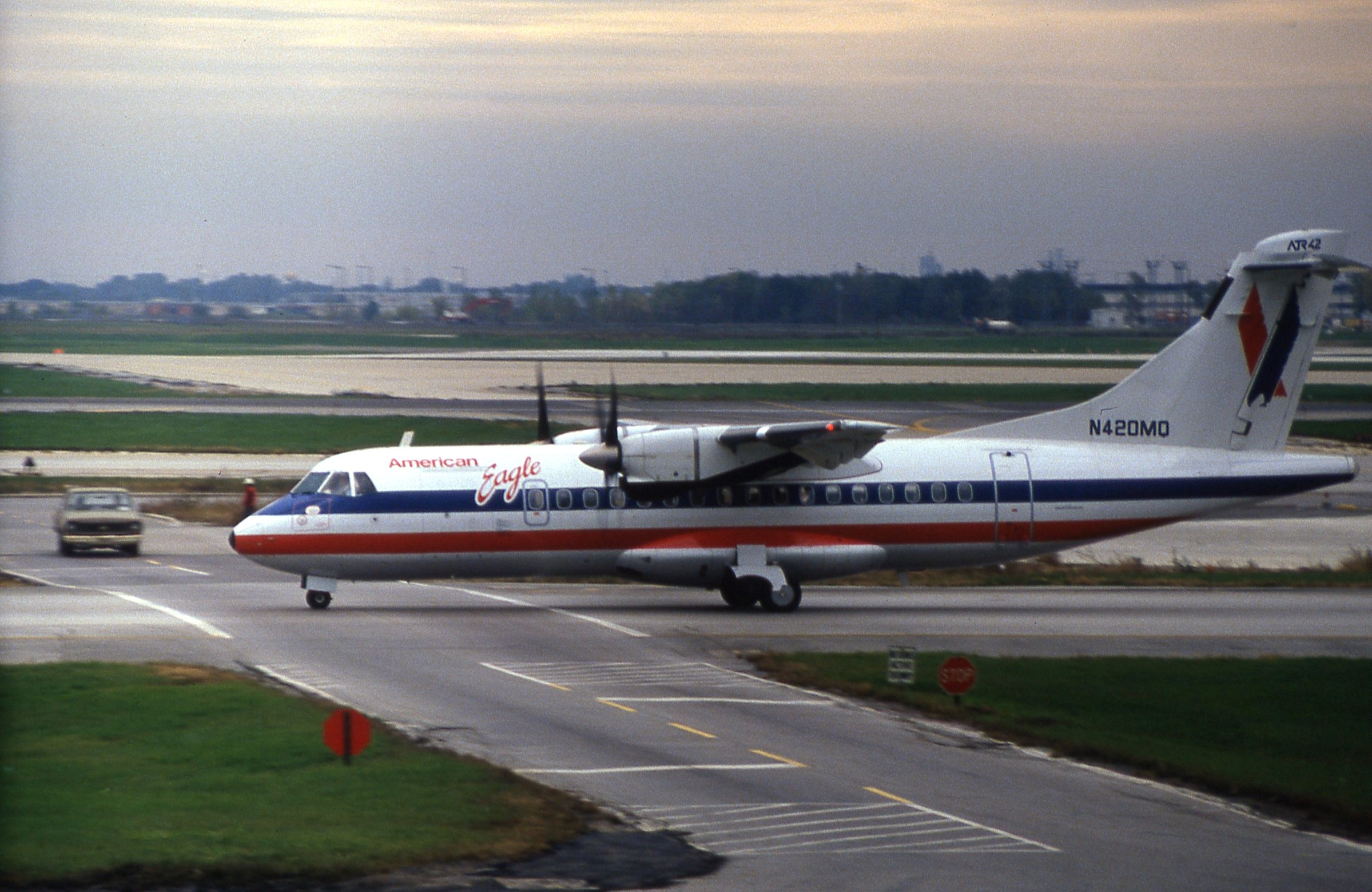
- The aircraft involved, pictured in 1986 while in operation with Simmons Airlines

Accident
- Date: 12 November 1999
- Summary: Controlled flight into terrain
- Site: Sllakovc, Vushtrri, Kosovo; 42°58′N 21°03′E

Aircraft
- Aircraft type: ATR 42-300
- Operator: Si Fly on behalf of the United Nations
- ICAO flight No.: KSV3275
- Call sign: KOSOVO 3275
- Registration: F-OHFV
- Flight origin: Leonardo da Vinci–Fiumicino Airport, Rome, Italy
- Destination: Pristina International Airport, Pristina, Kosovo
- Occupants: 24
- Passengers: 21
- Crew: 3
- Fatalities: 24
- Survivors: 0

Si Fly Flight 3275 (KSV3275) was a non-scheduled international passenger flight from the Italian capital of Rome to Pristina, Kosovo. The flight was operated by Italian airliner Si Fly using an ATR 42-300 series. On 12 November 1999, the aircraft struck a mountain during the approach to Pristina, killing everyone on board. With 24 deaths, the accident remains as the deadliest aviation disaster in Kosovo's history.

The investigation attributed the causes of the crash to multiple factors. The crew was experiencing fatigue due to their high roster and failed to execute the appropriate approach procedure to Pristina. The on-duty ATC personnel accidentally forgot to track the flight during the approach phase and did not pay enough attention during radar vectoring. Due to these issues combined with the faulty GPWS warning system, which was caused by the company's decision to postpone the rectification of the device, the aircraft failed to fly clear of terrain and crashed onto the mountain.

== Background ==
From 1998 to 1999, a war between the Federal Government of Yugoslavia and Kosovo Liberation Army broke out in Kosovo. Due to reports of ethnic cleansing of Albanians, North Atlantic Treaty Organization (NATO) forces invaded Yugoslavia in March 1999, resulting in the closure of airspace within the area of conflict. The United Nations passed Resolution 1244 and thus all civil activities were handed over to United Nations Interim Administration Mission in Kosovo (UNMIK). The resolution also stated that the Kosovo Force (KFOR) would be deployed in order to maintain peace. An agreement was signed to define the airspace that would be controlled by the KFOR.

Following the result of agreements that was signed in June 1999 in Helsinki, the operation of Pristina Airport was handed over to the Russian Army. At the same time, members of United Kingdom's Royal Air Force were ordered to be in charge of the air traffic control services and meteorological services in Pristina. The first RAF detachment arrived in June and the airport was reopened in July. Commercial flight at the airport was resumed in October.

== Aircraft ==
The aircraft was an ATR 42-312, registered as F-OHFV with a serial number of 012. It was delivered to Simmons Airlines, which did business as American Eagle, with a US registry number of N420MQ, later re-registered as N12MQ. In 1999, the aircraft was leased to Si Fly.

When it was delivered to Si Fly, the aircraft had more than 24,000 flying hours. The aircraft had been properly maintained. According to the technical logbook, there were no recorded defects on the aircraft.

== Passengers and crew ==
| Nationality | Fatalities | | Total |
| Nationality | Passengers | Crew | Total |
|---|---|---|---|
| Italy | 9 | 3 | 12 |
| Spain | 3 | 0 | 3 |
| United Kingdom (Note: One person was listed as Irish by officials. The passenger was a resident of Northern Ireland.) | 3 | 0 | 3 |
| Australia | 1 | 0 | 1 |
| Bangladesh | 1 | 0 | 1 |
| Canada | 1 | 0 | 1 |
| Germany | 1 | 0 | 1 |
| Iraq | 1 | 0 | 1 |
| Kenya | 1 | 0 | 1 |
| Total | 21 | 3 | 24 |

Most of the passengers were UN officials. Others were reported to be journalists and aid workers. The Italian newspaper la Repubblica reported that up to 12 Italians, including all three crew members, were on board the aircraft. There were also three Spanish citizens from UNMIK, three Britons representing their relief organizations, and one each from Australia, Bangladesh, Canada, Germany, Iraq and Kenya. The sole Canadian on board was a member of Correctional Service of Canada, representing the Government of Canada.

The captain, identified as 59-year-old Andrea Maccaferro, received his airline transport pilot license (ATPL) in 1989 and received his type rating on the ATR 42 in 1995. He had 18,000 flight hours, including 5,000 hours on the ATR 42. The first officer, identified as 49-year-old Antonio Canzolino, had logged 5,000 flight hours, with 1,800 of them on the ATR 42, and was the pilot flying (PF) on the accident flight. Both pilots were Italian nationals, had previous experience in landing at Pristina, and were former Italian Air Force pilots.

== Flight ==
Flight 3275 was a shuttle flight from Rome's Leonardo da Vinci–Fiumicino Airport to Pristina International Airport in Kosovo. It was a six-day-a-week flight and was chartered by World Food Programme for aid works in Kosovo following the war in the region. The flight was mainly used by aid workers, UN officials and journalists.

Flight 3275 departed Rome at 09:11 a.m for Pristina, Kosovo with 3 crew members and 21 passengers. The flight was piloted by Captain Andrea Maccaferro and Antonio Canzolino. After flying for nearly two hours, the aircraft reached the Macedonian airspace and the communication was handed over from Skopje ATC to Pristina ATC. After being identified by Pristina, the flight crew changed their flight conditions to visual flight rules (VFR). At 10:58 a.m, Pristina gave a series of headings for the crew to intercept the airport's ILS, which was acknowledged by Flight 3275. The controller reminded the crew that the airport could only provide limited radar service due to poor radar performance. He then gave the crew another heading and asked them to descend to 5,200 feet (1,600 m) before he ordered another descent to 4,600 feet (1,400 m).

=== Disappearance ===
While approaching the airport, the crew decided to make a call to Pristina ATC. The controller stated that he could hear them loud and clear, adding that they were number two for landing and giving the crew an advice regarding the presence of another aircraft which was located approximately 5 miles (8.0 km; 4.3 nmi) ahead of them. He later asked the crew to stay on their heading and turned his attention towards the other flights. At 11:13 a.m, the crew declared "I want to land" and the controller gave another heading to the crew. After confirming their position, the controller gave the last heading of 180. The crew responded "Kosovo three two seven five roger turn left heading one eight zero". This was the last transmission from Flight 3275.

=== Search and rescue ===
ATC noted that radio contact with the aircraft was lost, followed by radar contact at 11:20 local time. Kosovo Force was informed about the loss of contact at 11:45 p.m. Royal Air Force initially stated that the aircraft had landed in the Albanian capital of Tirana at 13:30 p.m, but the statement was immediately retracted as it was deemed to be false. Flight 3275 was later officially declared as missing.

At 14:30 local time, a search and rescue team assembled by NATO was deployed. Helicopters and 500 soldiers took part in the search and rescue operation. Search and rescue team searched for the aircraft overnight with thermal imaging and night-vision equipment. Search and rescue operation was hampered by weather, mountainous terrain, and mines in the area.

The wreckage of the aircraft was found later on the evening of 12 November, on a steep mountainside approximately 7 miles (11 km) from the town of Mitrovica. The aircraft failed to clear the mountain top by just 15 metres (49 ft). There were no signs of life among the wreckage. The first responder who arrived first at the scene stated that several charred bodies were found around the wreckage of the aircraft.

The aircraft initially impacted a tree before slamming onto terrain. Moments after impacting terrain, the tail and the left stabilizer immediately detached while the lower fuselage disintegrated. The rest of the aircraft then impacted terrain for the second time before it came to rest at the other side of the mountain. The wings and the cockpit were found in upside down position. Dozens of troops immediately cordoned the scene. On 14 November, the bodies of all 24 victims had been successfully recovered from the crash site.

== Investigation ==
The crash was investigated by France, Italy and the United Kingdom. ATR stated that they would send a team of experts to assist the investigation. The flight recorders were recovered on 13 November and were sent to BEA on the next day for a readout. Both recorders were found in good condition.

On 20 November, French investigators recommended Pristina Airport to close operation to all civilian flights. KFOR and UNMIK immediately followed the recommendation and temporarily suspended all civilian flights from entering and flying out of the airport on 21 November. Military flights were still allowed to operate in the airport.

=== Crew error ===
The cockpit voice recorder revealed that during the flight the crew was not following the appropriate procedure for an approach to Pristina. While approaching Pristina, the flight preparation was conducted hastily. During the briefing for the arrival, safety altitudes were not mentioned by the First officer and the Captain didn't ask any questions about it. Their actions were apparently influenced by the high amount of flights to Pristina, creating a sense of routine. This might have caused the crew to think that they didn't need to strictly follow the appropriate briefing as they would get assistance from the ATC anyway and thus would be cleared from the mountainous terrain in the area.

Further findings revealed more procedural deviations from the crew and also from the ATC. The ATC managed to give the crew altitudes lower than the minimum safety altitude that was written in the crew's approach chart, but the crew somehow didn't respond to the anomaly. The crew also selected a decision height of 200 feet (61 m), far lower than the airport's minimum decision height of 600 feet (180 m). While preparing for the approach, the crew elected to use an ILS approach without a glidepath, a clear violation of the airline's policy which prohibited the crew from taking such action.

Even though these deviations were caused by the crew's routine, there were indications that they were feeling fatigued during the flight. Based on an examination conducted by University of Paris, both flight crews were suffering from high level of fatigue, particularly the Captain. The Captain had lack of sleep and rest. Two days prior to the crash, he had flown a flight for 14 hours and on the next day he continued to fly for another 5 flights.

The fatigued state of the crew, their reliance with assistance from the ATC and added with their successful approaches in previous flights, caused them to feel confident enough that they would successfully conduct another typical approach to Pristina.

=== ATC failure ===
The war in Kosovo prompted the United Nations to pass Resolution 1244, meaning that all civil activities would be operated by military personnel, including the daily operation of the airport. They would provide limited ATC services to aircraft operators. Among the provided services was Radar Information Service (RIS), which was given upon request during meteorological condition that might affect visibility. Other than RIS, the ATC would provide radar vectoring as well. If the controller was requested by the crew to provide radar vectoring, then it was mandatory for the controller to pay attention to the flight and to clear them from terrain.

After the bombing of Yugoslavia by NATO forces in March 1999, the ATC operation was conducted by British RAF. On the day of the accident, the controller who was supposed to be on duty that day was unable to attend and was eventually replaced by a terminal control director. He received approximately just five hours of training for the approach radar position and was not familiar enough with the correct civil procedure. He didn't have experience with airports in mountainous area.

That day, two aircraft, including Flight 3275, had contacted the tower within seven minutes and were flying under visual flight condition. Flight 3275 was the number one to land, while the other aircraft was the second, both approaching from the south of the airport. The other aircraft was flying at 400 knots (741 km/h; 460 mph), significantly faster than Flight 3275. This surprised the controller and caused him to swap the landing order of each aircraft, with Flight 3275 being the second to land. At the time, Flight 3275's position was a bit north than the other aircraft and the crew was asked to maintain their heading. Later, the controller gave Flight 3275 a series of headings and altitudes for the approach to the airport's ILS, but by then Flight 3275 had entered an area where the minimum safety altitude was not at 4,600 feet (1,402 m) anymore, but at 7,000 feet (2,134 m). The rise in elevation eventually caused their radar plot to drop due to poor signal in the mountainous region.

The controller then turned his focus to the other aircraft. As there was no more radar plot from Flight 3275, the controller wasn't aware about the existence of Flight 3275. The crew of Flight 3275 eventually stated their intention to land and the controller gave them a westerly heading. He later blindly gave them another heading to the south of the airport. The controller was noted for being unresponsive regarding the low altitude of the aircraft. Apparently, he thought that the aircraft was still flying visually, even though the crew had not informed him about any changes on flight conditions. The aircraft maintained its low altitude and eventually flew into a layer of compact clouds before it impacted terrain.

=== GPWS malfunction ===
The cockpit voice recorder didn't record the sound of the GPWS warning inside the cockpit, even though the aircraft was equipped with GPWS. Instead, the recording captured the sound of a continuous repetitive chime on the last seconds of the flight. The GPWS was later recovered from the wreckage and was transported for further analysis. The result showed that the GPWS was not working properly during the mishap flight.

According to the investigation, this was not the first time that the GPWS had failed. Interviews from staffs indicated that the GPWS had failed multiple times, however the defect was not included in the technical logbook. The GPWS either had activated false alarm or had sent 'FAULT' message on the aircraft's monitor that prompted the crew to switch it off. Due to the inoperative GPWS, the crew was unable to receive any warning regarding the oncoming terrain.

The repeated failures of the GPWS was noted by investigators. Si Fly was aware of the problem, but the airline was waiting for the delivery of another ATR to reinforce their fleet and another A check maintenance visit from ATR on 13 and 14 November. With the recent high level of flying activity, those in positions of responsibility eventually opted to not ground the aircraft and to not include the failures inside the aircraft's technical logbook.

=== Lack of oversight ===
Si Fly was a newly-established Italian airliner. Their first operator certificate was issued in August 1999 and shortly after the airline began to operate flights, initially with four charter flights using a single ATR-42-300 and it eventually operated scheduled flights to Albenga. In 19 August, authorities in Balmoral signed the first lease contract with SiFly for a Rome-Pristina sector. Unfortunately, due to the urgency for flight operations in Pristina, the authorities in Balmoral couldn't conduct detailed check on Si Fly's operation. Balmoral fully relied on SiFly to execute the technical part of the contract.

After the signing of the contract for Rome - Pristina sector, the number of flying activity of SiFly suddenly jumped. From October to early November, almost two thirds of their overall flights were from the Rome - Pristina sector, even though the flight had only just begun in late October. Since the contract was a 30-day renewable basis contract, with SiFly's small management structures the situation became hard to manage, enabling the staffs to not adhere with the standard of operation (SOPs).

The documents that had been provided by SiFly depicted the airline as a well-organized airline, but according to the investigation the documents were merely used by the airline as a formality to obtain the required air transport certificate. There were multiple identified deficiencies within the operation of the airline, including the lack of knowledge and responsibility from those who held positions of responsibility. For instance, the Director of Operations, identified as the Chief Pilot of the airline, claimed that he himself descended below the minimum safe altitude during radar vectoring.

Due to the findings with the oversight of the airline, the BEA, within the final report of the investigation, quoted

The lack of any reaction to this ratio by the organisation responsible for oversight is astonishing.

With limited number of staffs and weak finance, the newly created airline, which was also undergoing rapid development with high amount of flights, eventually caused them to be unable to acquire enough experience regarding the implementation of the appropriate structures and procedures.

=== Other findings ===
The investigation revealed that there were at least 5 different sources that relayed information about the approach to Pristina. Some of the information were contradictory with the others and some were ambiguous. As a result, there was no uniform information, which could've caused confusion among pilots.

=== Conclusion ===
The report was released by BEA with the following conclusion:

The collision of KSV 3275 with high ground was due:

- to teamwork that lacked procedural discipline and vigilance during maneuvers in a mountainous region with poor visibility
- to the aircraft being kept on its track and then forgotten by a military controller unused to the mountainous environment of the aerodrome and to preventing collisions with high ground, within the framework of the radar service he was providing
- to the operator's critical situation as a new company highly dependent on the lease contract, favoring a failure to respect procedures
- to the opening of the aerodrome to civil traffic without an advance evaluation of the operating conditions or of the conditions for distribution of aeronautical information.

The following factors contributed to the accident:

- Crew fatigue, favoring a lowering of vigilance
- The crew undertaking the flight with an unserviceable or disconnected ground proximity warning system.

— BEA

Only 8 days after the accident, investigators issued several interim recommendations to Pristina Airport, among those were immediate evaluation regarding the infrastructure and operation in the airport. In response to the announcement, UNMIK and KFOR immediately followed the safety recommendations and closed the airport from all civilian flights. The following week, a team of ICAO experts was sent to Pristina. The remaining recommendations were issued after the completion of the investigation. Among those were improvements relating to oversight, mandatory modifications to improve vital aircraft equipment, and also the implementation of pre-flight check on GPWS system.

== Aftermath ==
In November 2018, European Union Rule of Law Mission in Kosovo (EULEX) held a memorial service at the crash site of Flight 3275. The service was also attended by the Italian embassy in Pristina, Italian Carabinieri, various UN agencies and members of the armed forces from multiple countries. A memorial plaque was erected at the site.

According to Flight Safety Foundation, the crash of Flight 3275 was the starting point that changed the flight safety for WFP aid flights.

== See also ==
- 1961 Ndola United Nations DC-6 crash
- 1996 Croatia USAF CT-43 crash
- Georgian Airways Flight 834
