= Sllakovc =

Sllakovc: Sllakovc (Albanian); Славковце/Slavkovce (Serbian)
- Village
- Location within Kosovo
- Location: Kosovo
- District: Mitrovicë
- Municipality: Vushtrri

Population (2011)
  - Total: 263
- Time zone: UTC+1 (CET)
  - Summer (DST): UTC+2 (CEST)

Sllakovc or Slavkovce (Serbian Cyrillic: Славковце), is a village in eastern Kosovo. The village is situated in the southern part of the Kopaonik mountain range.

== Geography ==
The river Slakovce which originates higher up in the mountains in the northern direction and which enters the Sitnica river near Pestova flows through Sllakovc. Nearby villages include Samodreha and Ciceli.

== History ==
The Si Fly Flight 3275 crashed into a mountain close to Sllakovc on November 12 1999, as a humanitarian aid flight to help Kosovars after the Kosovo War, killing 24 people on board, that departed from Rome to Pristina.
