= Dumosh-Batllava Airfield =

- IATA: none; ICAO: LYPT

Summary
- Airport type: Ex-military now civilian
- Owner: Kosovo Civil Aviation Authority
- Operator: 1999–2008 KFOR; 2022 in use of Ministry of Defense and Private Company
- Serves: Podujevë
- Location: Dumosh, Kosovo
- Elevation AMSL: 1,978 ft / 603 m
- Coordinates: 42°50′43.8″N 21°13′12.0″E

Map
- Location in Kosovo

Runways
Direction	Length		Surface
Direction	ft	m	Surface
02/20	4,921	1,500	Dirt (soil)

Dumosh-Batllava Airfield or Batllava Airport (ICAO: LYPT) (Albanian: Aeroporti i Batllavës; Serbian: Аеродром Батлава / Aerodrom Batlava) is a former military airport in the village of Dumosh, near Batllava Lake and the village of Batllavë and the city of Podujevë in Kosovo. This airfield is located 25 km (16 mi) from the city of Pristina and 32 km (20 mi) air distance from Pristina International Airport Adem Jashari.

== History ==
In 1936, Aeroput used the airport on the Belgrade-Podujevë-Skopje line using the Aeroput MMS-3 plane. The airport was later rebuilt for military use by the Yugoslav army and air force. It was damaged in 1999 during the NATO bombing of the Federal Republic of Yugoslavia.

== See also ==
- List of airports in Kosovo
- Dumosh
