= GP Aviation =

Airline based in Zurich, Switzerland

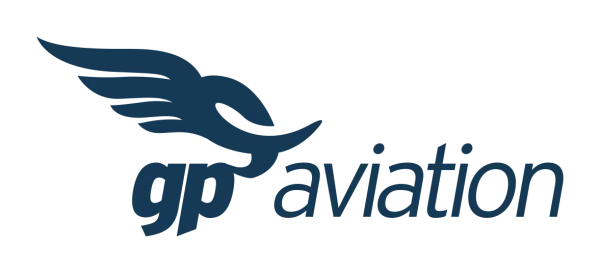

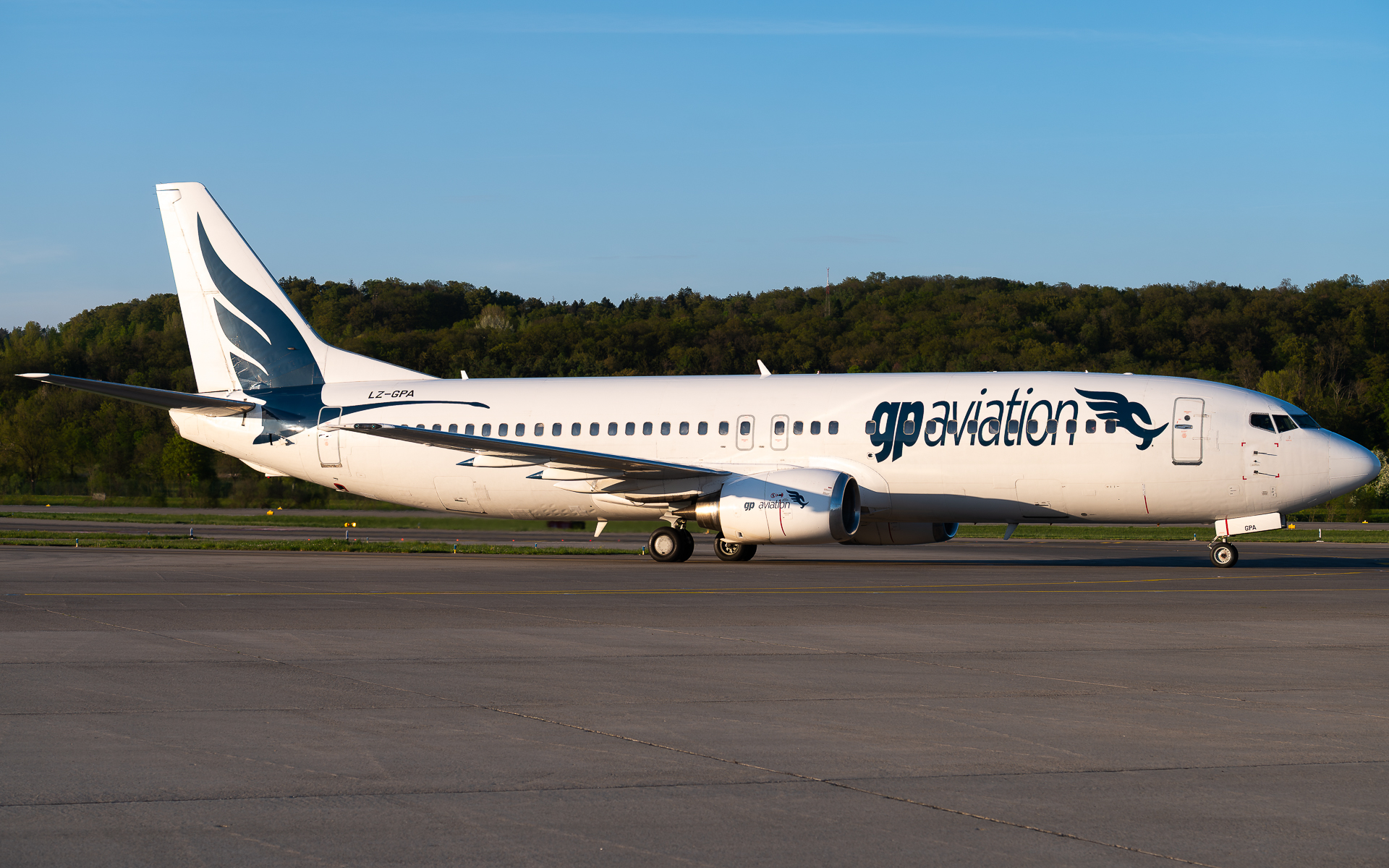
- A GP Aviation 737-400
IATA	ICAO	Call sign
IV	GPX	IVORY
- Founded: 17 March 2016; 10 years ago
- Commenced operations: 2019; 7 years ago
- Operating bases: Pristina
- Fleet size: 9
- Destinations: 27
- Headquarters: Zurich, Switzerland
- Founder: Ganesh Piga
- Website: gpaviation.eu/en (airline) gp-aviation.ch (corporate)

GP Aviation is an airline based in Switzerland that operates with a Bulgarian air operator's certificate. It is headquartered in Zurich, Switzerland and operates passenger flights and aviation services across Europe, primarily connecting cities with Pristina, Kosovo.

== History ==
GP Aviation began in 2016 as an air transport and ferry flight company.

Neue Zürcher Zeitung reported in 2026 that GP Aviation had accrued 9 Million Euros in tax debt. The founder was arrested for tax evasion and extradited to Germany in April, where he stayed for several weeks. The airline was also reported to have systemically ignored compensation requests for cancellations and delays to passengers.

== Destinations ==
As of 2026, GP Aviation flies to the following destinations:

Country	City	Airport	Notes	Ref.
Switzerland	Zurich	Zurich Airport		
Switzerland	Basel	EuroAirport Basel Mulhouse Freiburg		
Switzerland	Geneva	Geneva Airport		
Germany	Düsseldorf	Düsseldorf Airport		

== Fleet ==
As of July 2026, GP Aviation operates the following aircraft:

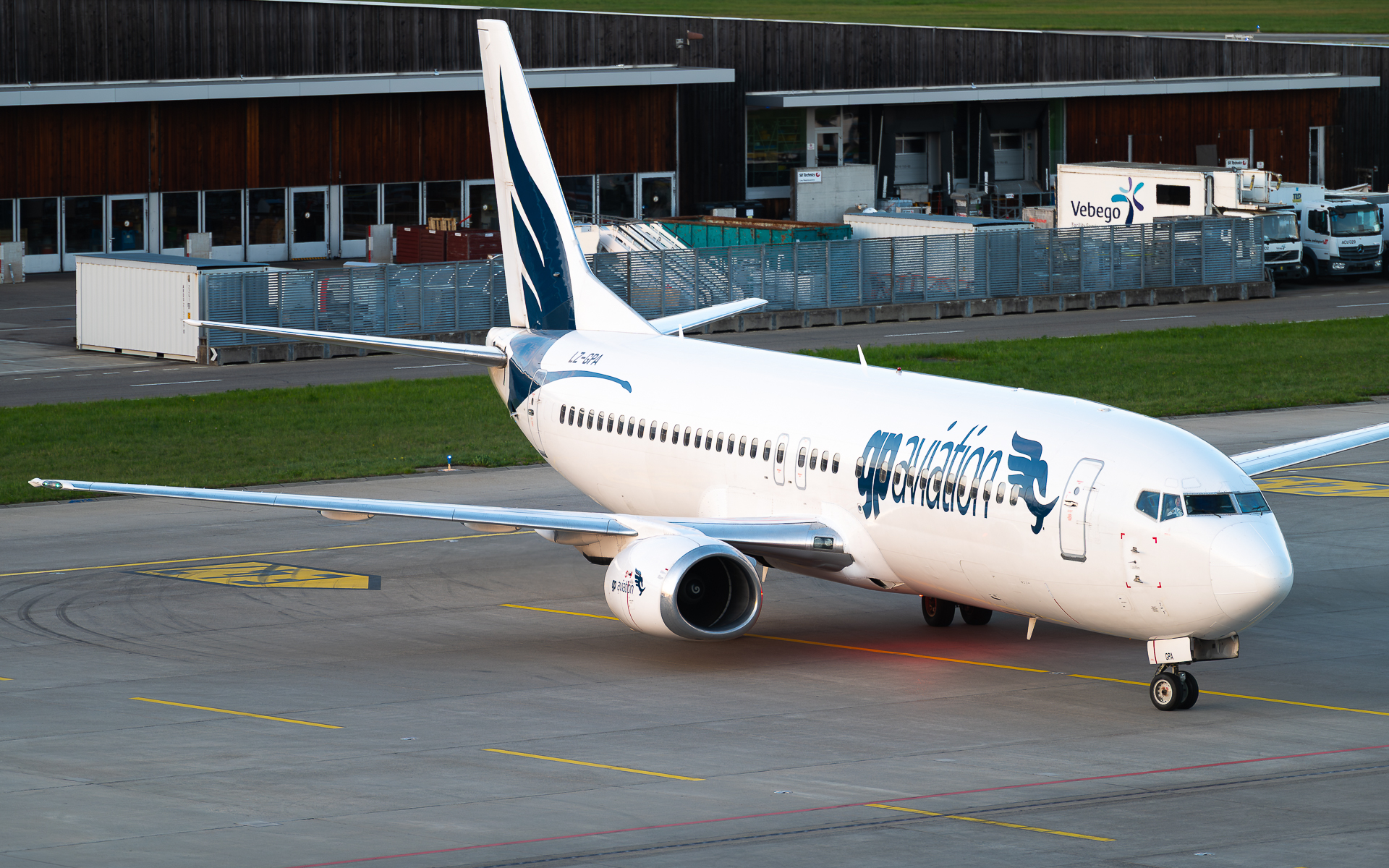
GP Aviation 737-400 (LZ-GPA) taxiing into stand at Zurich Airport

GP Aviation fleet
Aircraft	In service	Orders	Passengers	Notes
Boeing 737-400	4		168	
Airbus A319-100	2		140	
Airbus A320-200	3	—	180	
Total	9	—		
