= Pristina International Airport =

Airport in Pristina, Kosovo

Prishtina International Airport Adem Jashari Aeroporti Ndërkombëtar i Prishtinës Adem Jashari

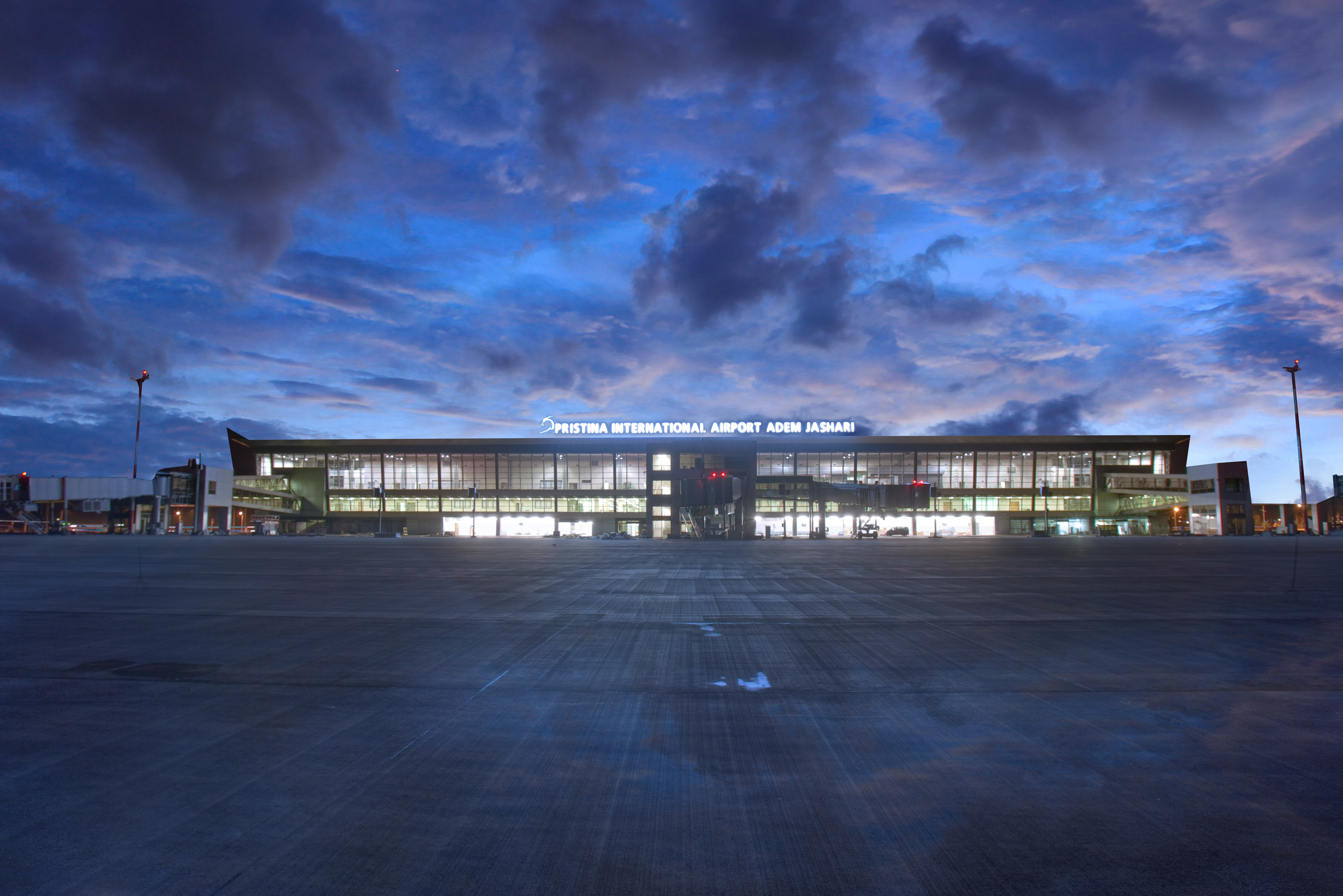
- Pristina International Airport in 2013
- IATA: PRN; ICAO: BKPR

Summary
- Airport type: Public/Military
- Operator: Limak Kosovo International Airport J.S.C.
- Serves: Pristina
- Location: Lipjan, Kosovo
- Opened: 1965; 61 years ago (as domestic airport); 15 October 1999; 27 years ago (as international airport)
- Operating base for: GP Aviation; Wizz Air (begins 16 November 2026)
- Elevation AMSL: 545 m (1,788 ft)
- Coordinates: 42°34′22″N 021°02′09″E
- Website: Official website
- Interactive map of Prishtina International Airport Adem Jashari

Runways
| Direction | Length | | Surface |
| Direction | m | ft | Surface |
|---|---|---|---|
| 17/35 | 3,000 | 9,842 | Asphalt |

Statistics (2025)
- Passengers: 4,600,484 ▲12.7%
- Flight departures: 14,981 ▲10.8%
- Sources: Kosovo AIP at EUROCONTROL; Civil Aviation Authority of Kosovo

The Prishtina International Airport Adem Jashari (Albanian: Aeroporti Ndërkombëtar i Prishtinës Adem Jashari, Serbian: Аеродром Адем Јашари Приштина / Aerodrom Adem Jašari Priština), also referred to as Pristina International Airport (Albanian: Aeroporti Ndërkombëtar i Prishtinës, Serbian: Међународни аеродром Приштина / Međunarodni aerodrom Priština, IATA: PRN, ICAO: BKPR), is an international airport in Pristina, Kosovo. The airport is located 15 km (9.3 mi) southwest of the capital city of Pristina. The airport has flights to numerous European destinations. The airport is the only international airport in Kosovo, eventually serving as the only port of entry for air travelers to the country. It is named in honor of Adem Jashari, one of the founders and senior commanders of the Kosovo Liberation Army.

== History ==
=== Foundation and early years ===
The airport was originally built as Slatina Air Base, containing the second-largest military underground hangar complex in Yugoslavia.

From 12 to 26 June 1999, there was a brief but tense stand-off between NATO and the Russian Kosovo Force in which Russian troops possessed the airport. A contingent of 200 Russian troops deployed in Bosnia and Herzegovina, crossed over into Kosovo and subsequently captured the airport in Pristina.

The apron and the passenger terminal were renovated and expanded in 2002 and again in 2009. In June 2006, Pristina International Airport was awarded the Best Airport 2006 Award by Airports Council International (ACI). Winning airports were selected for excellence and achievement across a range of disciplines, including airport development, operations, facilities, security and safety, and customer service.

On 12 November 2008, Pristina International Airport received for the first time in its history the annual one-millionth passenger (excluding military). A special ceremony was held at the airport where the one-millionth passenger received a free return ticket to a destination of his choice served by the airport.

=== Development since 2010 ===
In late 2010, the airport was renamed from Pristina International Airport to Pristina International Airport Adem Jashari, the founder of the Kosovo Liberation Army.

Due to the ongoing dispute between Serbia and Kosovo, flights to and from Pristina International Airport are impacted by the refusal of ATC in Serbia, namely SMATSA, to allow overflights via Serbian airspace. This ultimately results in flight paths avoiding Serbian territory, with flights to Pristina having to enter via Albanian or Macedonian airspace. This dispute can generally add up to 30 minutes to a flight duration; however, all discussions aimed at overcoming this dispute have so far failed.

In April 2011, operation was handed to Limak Kosovo International Airport J.S.C. under a design-build-finance-operate-transfer (DBFOT) 20-year concession agreement with the Turkish-French consortium Limak Holding and Aeroports de Lyon. To take account of travel disruptions due to COVID-19, in 2024, the concession agreement was extended another 20 months.

In 2013, a new 42,000 m^{2} (450,000 sq ft) terminal was inaugurated. In December 2021, the runway was extended from 2,500 to 3,000 m (8,200 to 9,800 ft) and ILS upgraded from Category 2 to Category 3b, funded by the Kosovo Government. In July 2024, the number of gates increased from 8 to 12, funded by the private operator.

== Airlines and destinations ==
The following airlines operate regular scheduled and charter flights to and from Pristina:

| Airlines | Destinations |
|---|---|
| AJet | Istanbul–Sabiha Gökçen |
| Austrian Airlines | Vienna |
| Chair Airlines | Basel/Mulhouse, Stuttgart, Zurich |
| easyJet | Basel/Mulhouse, Berlin, Geneva, London–Luton (begins 7 December 2026), Lyon, Milan–Malpensa, Zurich |
| Edelweiss Air | Zurich |
| Enter Air | Düsseldorf |
| Eurowings | Cologne/Bonn, Düsseldorf, Frankfurt, Hamburg, Hannover, Munich, Stuttgart; Seasonal: Salzburg |
| Flynas | Seasonal: Jeddah, Medina |
| GP Aviation | Basel/Mulhouse, Berlin, Cologne, Dortmund, Düsseldorf, Geneva, Göteborg, Hamburg, Hannover, Helsinki, Karlsruhe/Baden-Baden, Ljubljana, Luxembourg, Malmö, Munich, Münster/Osnabrück, Nuremberg, Stuttgart, Växjö, Vienna, Zurich; Seasonal: Rimini |
| Nesma Airlines | Seasonal charter: Hurghada |
| Norwegian Air Shuttle | Helsinki, Oslo; Seasonal: Copenhagen, Gothenburg, Stockholm–Arlanda |
| Pegasus Airlines | Istanbul–Sabiha Gökçen; Seasonal: Antalya |
| SunExpress | Seasonal: Antalya, İzmir |
| TUI fly Belgium | Brussels |
| Turkish Airlines | Istanbul |
| Wizz Air | Basel/Mulhouse, Berlin (begins 14 December 2026), Bratislava, Charleroi, Dortmund, Frankfurt-Hahn (begins 14 December 2026), Hamburg (begins 15 December 2026), Karlsruhe/Baden-Baden, London–Luton, Malmö (begins 15 December 2026), Memmingen, Milan–Malpensa, Rome–Fiumicino, Trieste (begins 19 December 2026) |

== Statistics ==
=== Traffic ===
| Year | Passengers | Change | Flight Departures | Change | Ref. |
|---|---|---|---|---|---|
| 2000 | 396,717 | - | 2,176 | - | |
| 2001 | 779,646 | ▲96.5% | 3,902 | ▲79.3% | |
| 2002 | 844,098 | ▲8.3% | 4,171 | ▲6.90% | |
| 2003 | 835,036 | ▼1.1% | 4,163 | ▼0.2% | |
| 2004 | 910,797 | ▲9.1% | 4,716 | ▲13.3% | |
| 2005 | 930,346 | ▲2.1% | 4,983 | ▲5.7% | |
| 2006 | 882,731 | ▼5.1% | 4,077 | ▼18.2% | |
| 2007 | 990,259 | ▲12.2% | 4,316 | ▲5.9% | |
| 2008 | 1,130,639 | ▲14.2% | 4,928 | ▲14.2% | |
| 2009 | 1,191,978 | ▲5.4% | 5,709 | ▲15.8% | |
| 2010 | 1,305,532 | ▲9.5% | 6,143 | ▲7.6% | |
| 2011 | 1,422,302 | ▲8.9% | 6,738 | ▲9.7% | |
| 2012 | 1,527,134 | ▲7.4% | 6,947 | ▲3.1% | |
| 2013 | 1,628,678 | ▲6.6% | 7,305 | ▲5.2% | |
| 2014 | 1,404,775 | ▼13.7% | 5,994 | ▼17.9% | |
| 2015 | 1,549,198 | ▲10.3% | 6,773 | ▲13.0% | |
| 2016 | 1,744,202 | ▲12.6% | 7,254 | ▲7.1% | |
| 2017 | 1,885,136 | ▲8.1% | 7,508 | ▲3.5% | |
| 2018 | 2,165,749 | ▲14.9% | 8,388 | ▲11.7% | |
| 2019 | 2,373,698 | ▲9.6% | 9,113 | ▲8.6% | |
| 2020 | 1,104,435 | ▼53.5% | 4,651 | ▼48.9% | |
| 2021 | 2,180,809 | ▲97.5% | 8,921 | ▲91.8% | |
| 2022 | 2,994,560 | ▲37.3% | 10,827 | ▲21.4% | |
| 2023 | 3,424,883 | ▲14.4% | 11,639 | ▲7.5% | |
| 2024 | 4,082,481 | ▲19.2% | 13,518 | ▲16.1% | |
| 2025 | 4,600,484 | ▲12.7% | 14,981 | ▲10.8% | |

=== Busiest routes (2024) ===
| City | Airport(s) | Market Share |
|---|---|---|
| Basel Switzerland, Mulhouse France, Freiburg Germany | Basel/Mulhouse/Freiburg Airport | 18% |
| Zürich | Zurich Airport | 14% |
| Düsseldorf | Düsseldorf Airport | 10% |
| Istanbul | Istanbul Airport and Sabiha Gökçen Airport | 10% |
| Stuttgart | Stuttgart Airport | 9% |
| Geneva | Geneva Airport | 8% |
| Vienna | Vienna Airport | 7% |
| Munich | Munich Airport | 7% |
| London | Luton | 3% |
| Dortmund | Dortmund | 2% |
| Milan | Milan Malpensa | 2% |
| Münster | Münster Osnabrück | 2% |
| Berlin | Berlin Brandenburg | 2% |
| Other | — | 14% |

=== Largest country markets (2024) ===
| Country | Market Share |
|---|---|
| Germany | 36.34% |
| Switzerland | 35.16% |
| Turkey | 12.05% |
| Austria | 6.12% |
| United Kingdom | 2.55% |
| Italy | 2.05% |
| Sweden | 1.99% |

== Ground transportation ==
=== Car ===
The airport is linked with the M-9 motorway, which connects with the R7 motorway.

=== Taxi ===
Taxis from the airport to Pristina are available.

=== Bus ===
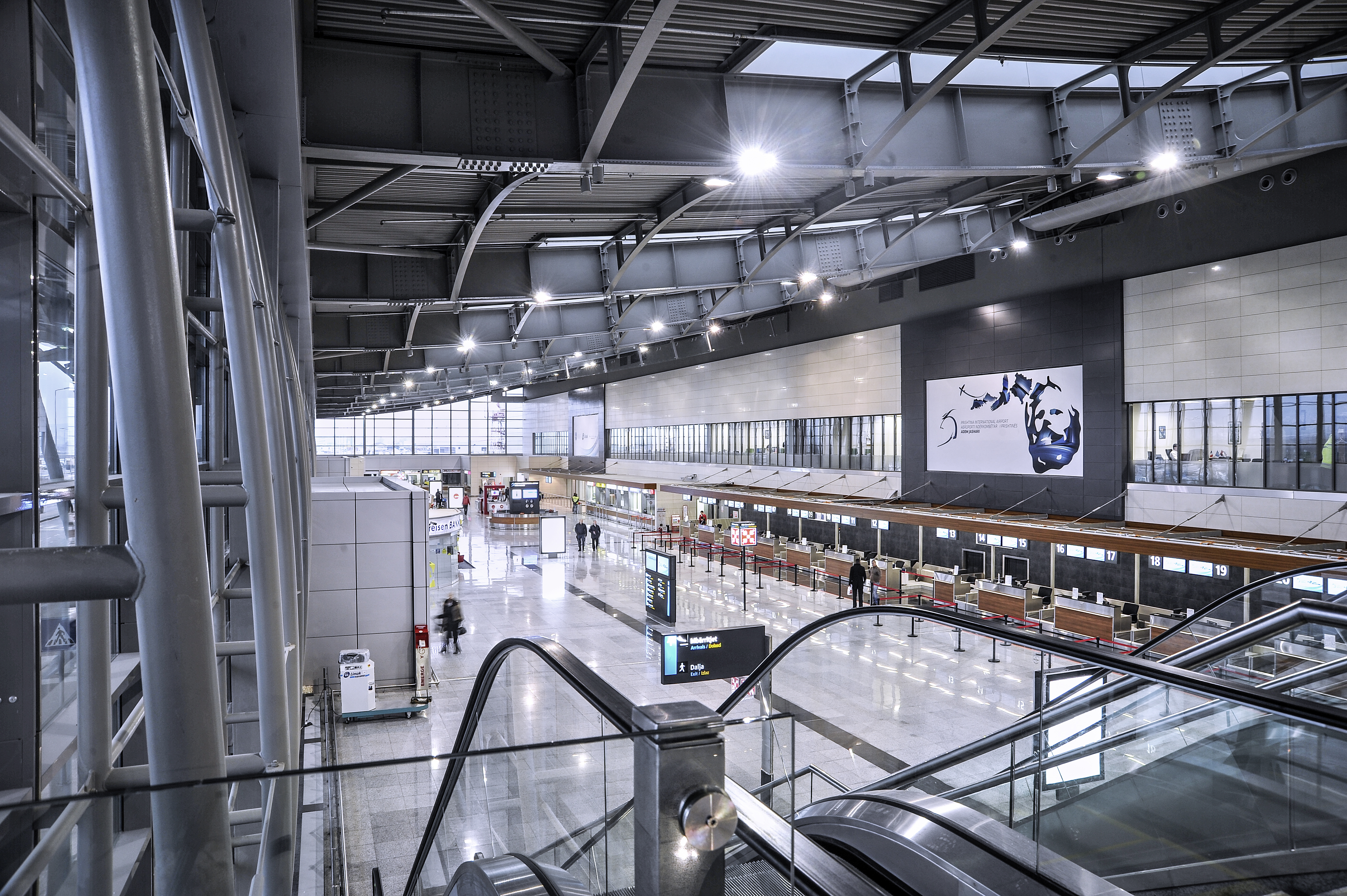
Check-in hall

The airport can be reached from the city center, via the 1A bus route, which departs from the Pristina Bus Station every two hours. The first bus starts at 07:00 from the city's main bus station to the airport and then for every two hours, the last one being at 23:00. From the airport to city, the first bus is on 08:00 and the last at 24:00, also every two hours.

=== Rail ===
There is also a plan to connect the airport to Pristina by rail based on a feasibility study. However, as of mid-2025 no plans for construction have been laid out.

== Accidents and incidents ==
- On November 12, 1999, Si Fly Flight 3275 crashed while approaching the airport after a flight from Rome International Airport, killing all 24 occupants.
- On January 19, 2006, a Slovak Air Force, Antonov, An-24 crashed over Hungary after departing from Pristina International Airport. (See, 2006 Slovak Air Force Antonov-24 Crash)
- On 2 May 2016, a Turkish Airlines Boeing 737-800 arriving from Istanbul had a runway excursion. The left engine and both main landing gear assemblies were damaged but there were no injuries.

== See also ==
- Transport in Kosovo
- Gjakova Airport in Gjakova
- Dumosh-Batllava Airfield
