= Aviation in Turkey =

Turkey is an emerging aviation hub at the intersection of Europe with emerging markets in the Middle East, the Caucasus and Northern Africa.

== History ==
Turkey's aviation history goes back all the way to the founding of Turkish Republic. Mustafa Kemal Atatürk realized the need of an independent self-sufficient aviation industry, when he was serving as a military officer during Ottoman era. After the republic was founded in 1923, Atatürk addressed the Parliament on November 1, 1924, while speaking about national defense, he said : "When speaking of national defense, I especially draw the attention and interest of the Grand Assembly to the air forces, which are an important and influential factor in the military world".

Atatürk's government immediately initiated efforts to build an aviation industry from scratch. At first, he established the Türk Tayyare Cemiyeti (Turkish Aircraft Association) on February 16, 1925. Later it was renamed as Türk Hava Kurumu (Turkish Aeronautical Association). He also left the copyright income of his famous book Nutuk to this institution, along with a 10,000 Turkish Lira donation. With the budget allocation and aid received, THK started buying foreign-manufactured aircraft. The THK also sent many Turkish aviation engineers and pilots to receive higher education and training in countries like Germany, United States and Soviet Union. Separately from the Turkish Aeronautical Association, on May 20, 1933, the ‘State Airlines Administration’ was established, which later became Turkish Airlines. On May 3, 1935, Atatürk established Türk Kuşu(Turkish Bird) - a flight school under THK, to introduce Turkish youth to aviation and to provide training to them. In 1925, Turkey's first military aviation school and airport was established in Eskişehir. On April 23, 1926, the ‘Aircraft Mechanic School’ was opened to train the technical personnel required by Turkish aviation. Students were sent to France and Germany for aircraft engineering training.

== Airlines ==
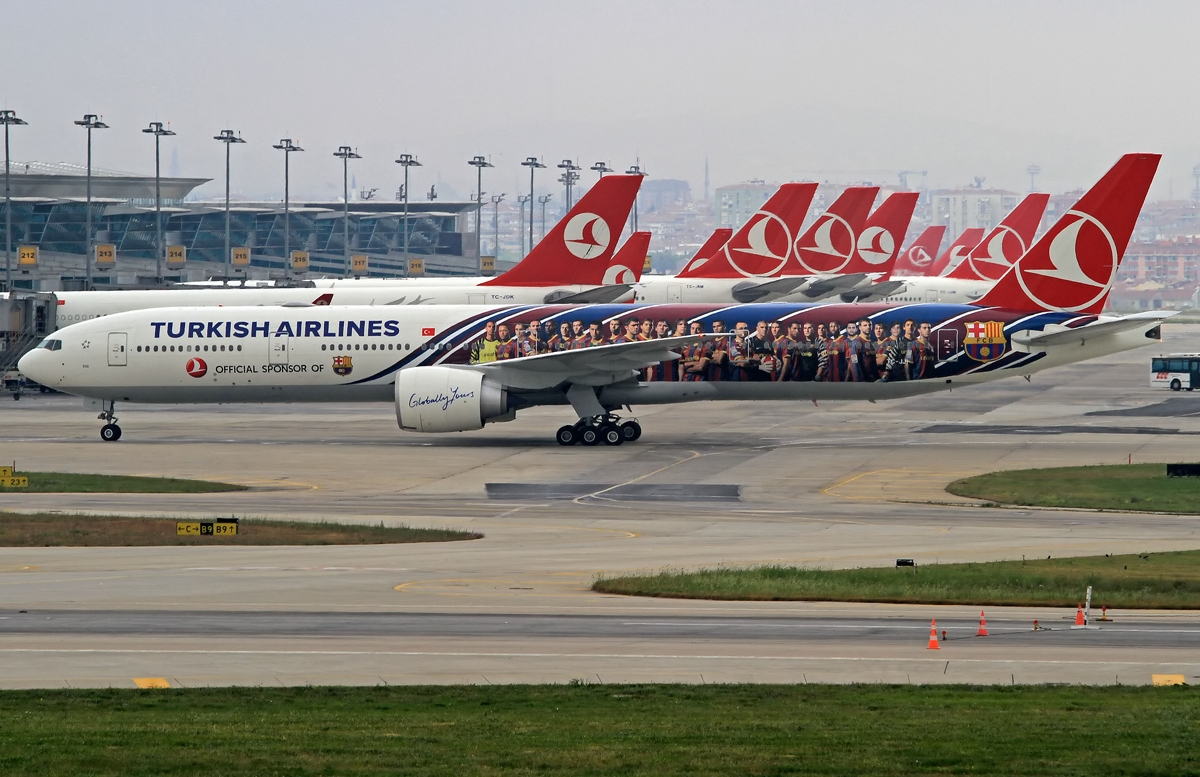
Turkish Airlines jets

In 1983, the Turkish airline market was liberalized. While before, only public companies were allowed to serve the country's airports, with the enactment of the 1983 Civil Aviation Law, private companies were admitted. As the regulation failed at setting up a competitive environment, the quasi-monopoly of Turkey's national flag carrier Turkish Airlines was further reinforced. It was only in 2003, that major barriers for market entry were erased, leading to a more competitive market, though Turkish Airlines continued to benefit from state support.

As of 2023, Turkish Airlines is one of the major airlines of the world, particularly by its number of international passengers with 83.4 million passengers. Operating scheduled services to 122 countries and 304 destinations all around the world. The Turkish airlines flies to more countries than any other airlines in the world.

== Airports ==
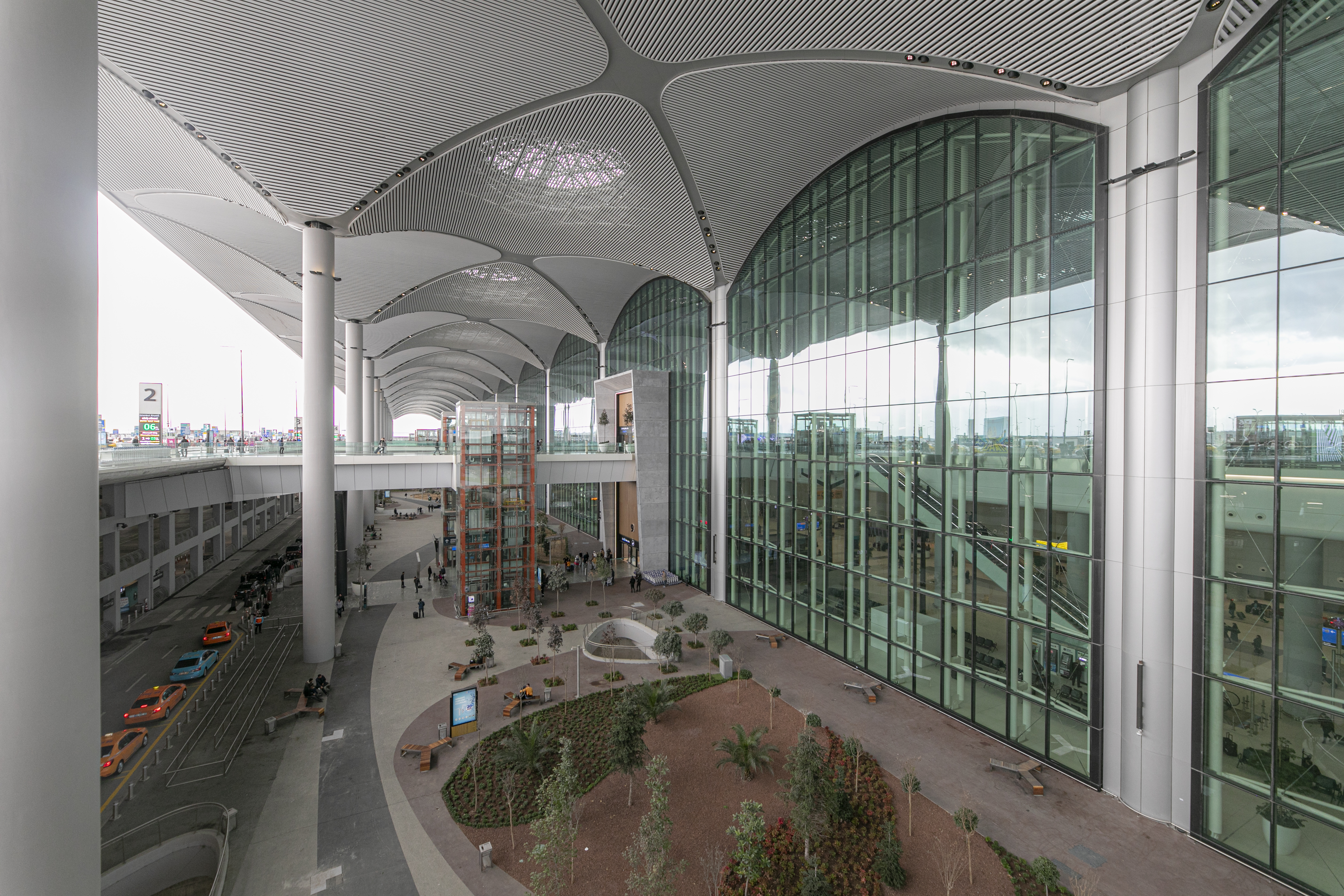
Entrance area of Istanbul Airport

Since the 2000s, the country has seen an extraordinary development in civil aviation with a growth ten times faster than the world average. While Turkey's airports only handled 34 million passengers in 2003, the number rose to 105 million in 2010, 52 percent of which were on international flights. In 2012, Turkish airports handled 130 million passengers, making it the sixth-largest aviation market in Europe.

In 2015, Istanbul's Atatürk Airport handled 61.8 million passengers making it the world's 11th busiest airport at the time. The aging airport was however replaced by the larger Istanbul Airport. With the world's largest airport terminal, initially serving 90 million passengers the new airport will massively expand the passenger capacity, with two more terminals being planned summing up to 150 million passengers per year. By 2035, the new airport is projected to be the world's largest airport serving 260 million passengers annually.

Under Transport Minister Binali Yıldırım, numerous new airports were opened, starting with Zonguldak Airport and Şanlıurfa GAP Airport and the controversial Hatay Airport in 2007. Amasya Merzifon Airport followed in 2008, while Gazipaşa Airport serving Antalya and Gökçeada Airport serving Çanakkale were opened in 2010. Zafer Airport serving the cities of Afyonkarahisar, Uşak and Kütahya in 2012, Iğdır Airport also in 2012 and Şırnak Airport followed in 2013. Erhaç Airport in Malatya and Cengiz Topel Airport in Kocaeli, previously operating as military air bases, were opened to civil aviation in 2007 and 2011 respectively. A new international terminal at İzmir's Adnan Menderes Airport was opened in 2006, followed by a new domestic terminal in 2014. New terminal buildings for Erzincan Airport and Mardin Airport were both opened in 2011 and a new international terminal for Milas–Bodrum Airport was completed in 2012.

In the same period, many other airports were refurbished, including the Tokat, Kahramanmaraş, Sivas, Gaziantep and Çanakkale, Balıkesir and Kars Harakani airports reopened in 2006 and 2007. Major improvements to Balıkesir Koca Seyit Airport and Kastamonu Airport were completed in 2010 and 2013 respectively.

=== Airport construction ===
In the airport sector, construction company Limak İnşaat grew into the position as one of the regional market leaders. In 2007, a Limak joint venture with French company Aéroport de Lyon won the concession tender for Pristina International Airport Adem Jashari. In 2015, the company won the tender for a new terminal building at Kuwait International Airport. Limak is also part of the joint venture that won the tender for Istanbul Airport, Turkey's largest PPP infrastructure project, and due to become the world's largest airport.

== Aerospace industry ==
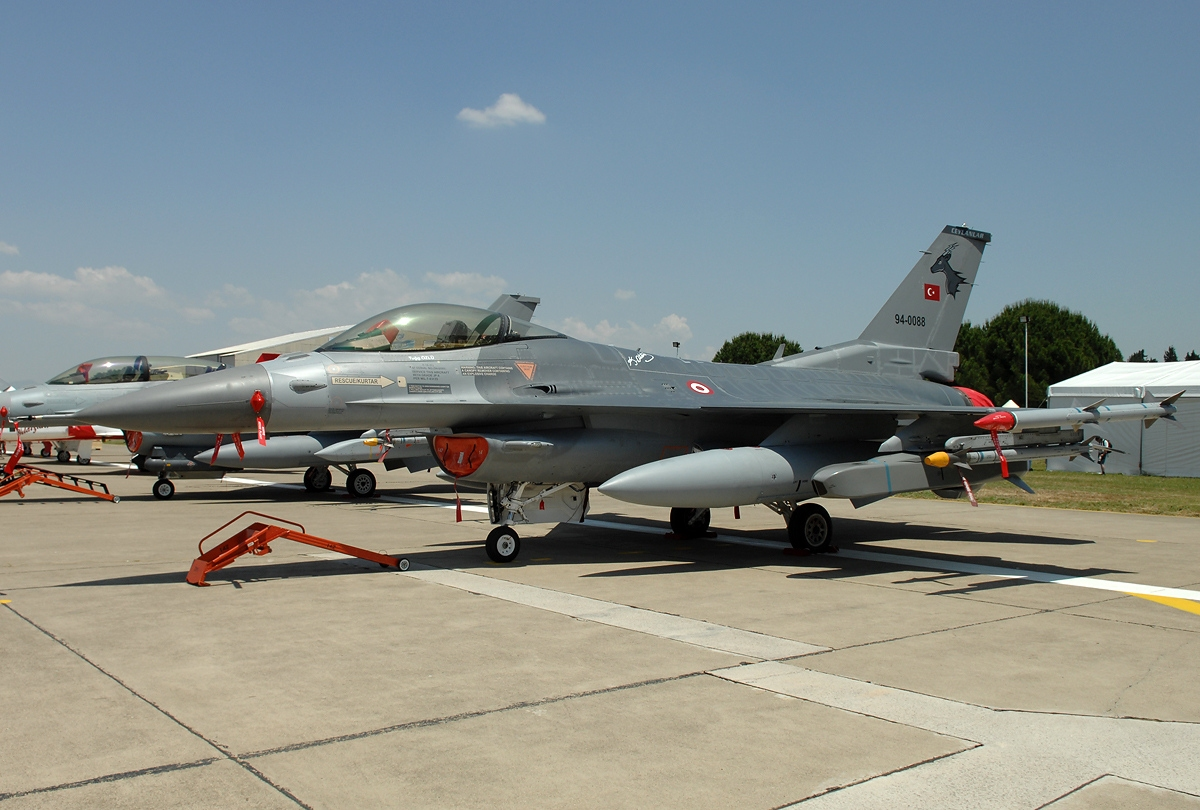
An F-16C fighter of the Turkish Air Force, produced by Turkish Aerospace Industries

Turkey has sought for a national aerospace industry since the foundation of the Republic. Under the auspices of the Turkish Ministry for Industry and Technology, Turkey's aircraft industry today is centered on the Turkish Aerospace Inc. (TAI) - founded in 1984 - expanding on a predecessor established in 1973, and Tusaş Engine Industries (TEI). Several indigenous fighter aircraft programs are under development, the most ambitious of which is the air superiority fighter TAI KAAN (started in 2011) for the Turkish Air Force and future export purposes. TAI produces the trainer and light combat aircraft TAI Hürkuş and TAI Hürjet, the attack helicopter T129 ATAK, the UAVs TAI Anka and TAI Aksungur, and several reconnaissance and military satellites such as the Göktürk-3. The private company Baykar is known for its proven tactical UAV Bayraktar TB2.

== See also ==
- Transport in Turkey
