= Sky Airlines =

Turkish charter airline, based Antalya

IATA	ICAO	Call sign
ZY	SHY	SKY POWER
- Founded: 2000
- Commenced operations: 2001
- Ceased operations: 2013
- Hubs: Antalya Airport
- Secondary hubs: Dalaman Airport; Milas–Bodrum Airport
- Frequent-flyer program: Miles&Sky
- Subsidiaries: German Sky Airlines
- Fleet size: 1
- Destinations: 50
- Parent company: Kayi Group
- Headquarters: Antalya, Turkey
- Key people: Tahir Gorgulu (CEO)
- Website: www.skyairlines.net

Sky Airlines was an airline which operated chartered flights. It was based in Antalya, Turkey, operating on behalf of tour operators on short and medium haul routes into Turkey.

== History ==
The company was established in 2000 and started operations in 2001. It was wholly owned by Kayi Group. In 2010, the airline started scheduled domestic operations in Turkey making it the 9th airline to enter the domestic market. It downsized operations for winter 2012–13, returning three Boeing 737-800s to their lessors.

A subsidiary, German Sky Airlines, based in Düsseldorf, was launched in 2010. On 1 December 2012 it announced a suspension of services (due to the economic downturn) and returned two Boeing 737-800s to their lessors. The airline hoped to resume services in Spring 2013.

On 4 June 2013, the airline filed for bankruptcy, and ceased all flight operations with immediate effect.

== Destinations ==
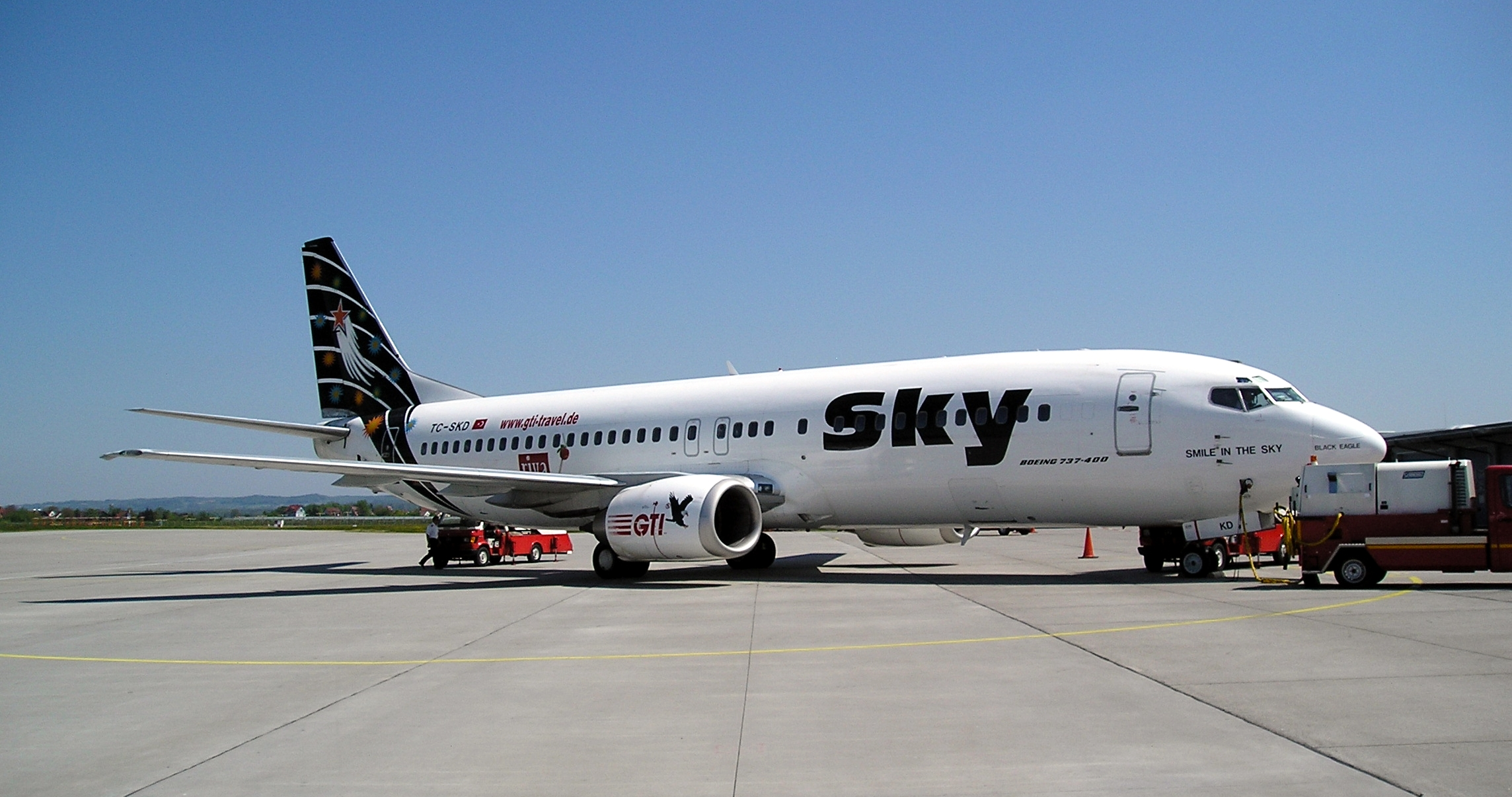
A Sky Airlines Boeing 737-400 (2005)

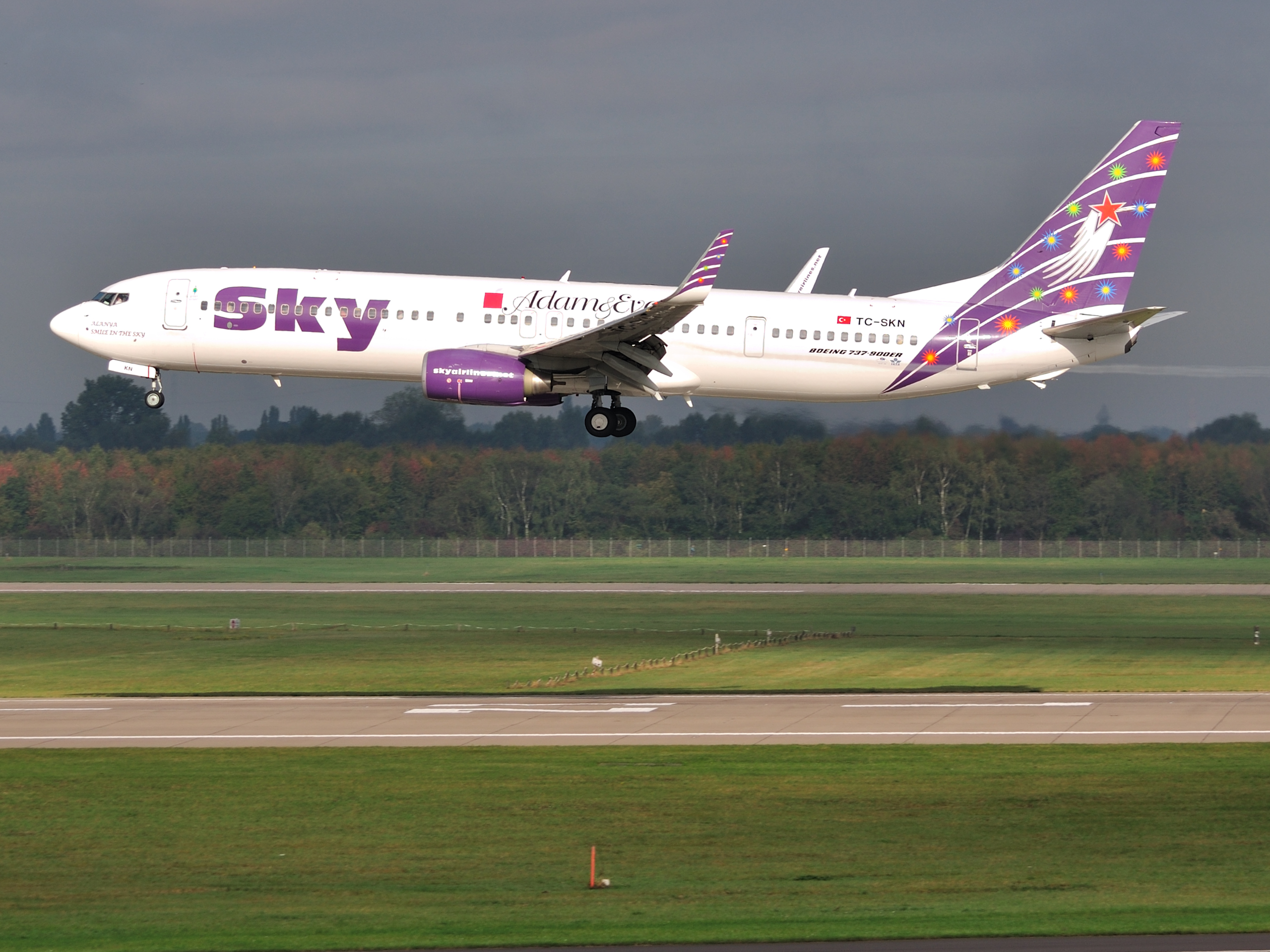
A Sky Airlines Boeing 737-900 (2012)

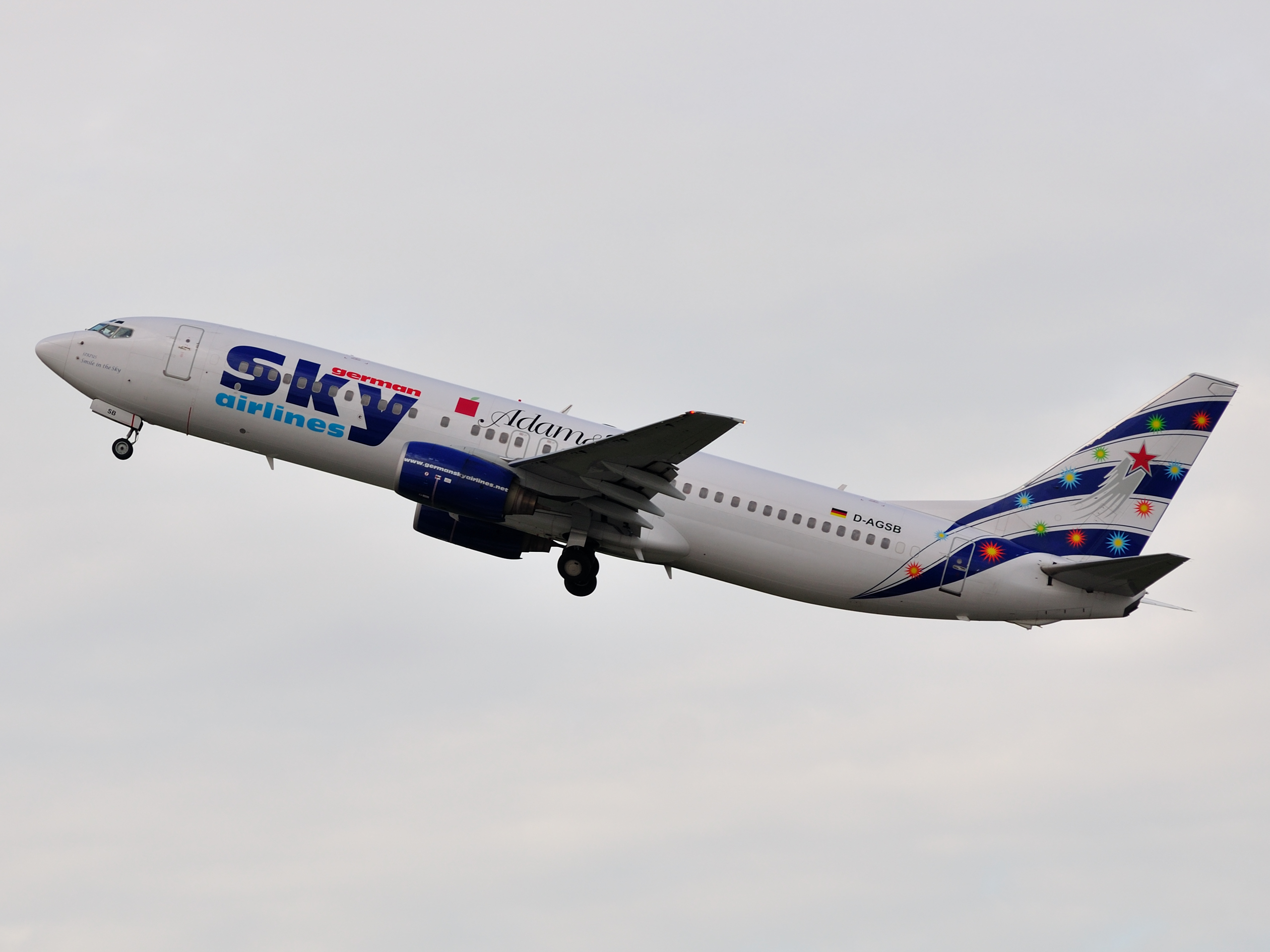
A Sky Airlines Boeing 737-800 (2012)

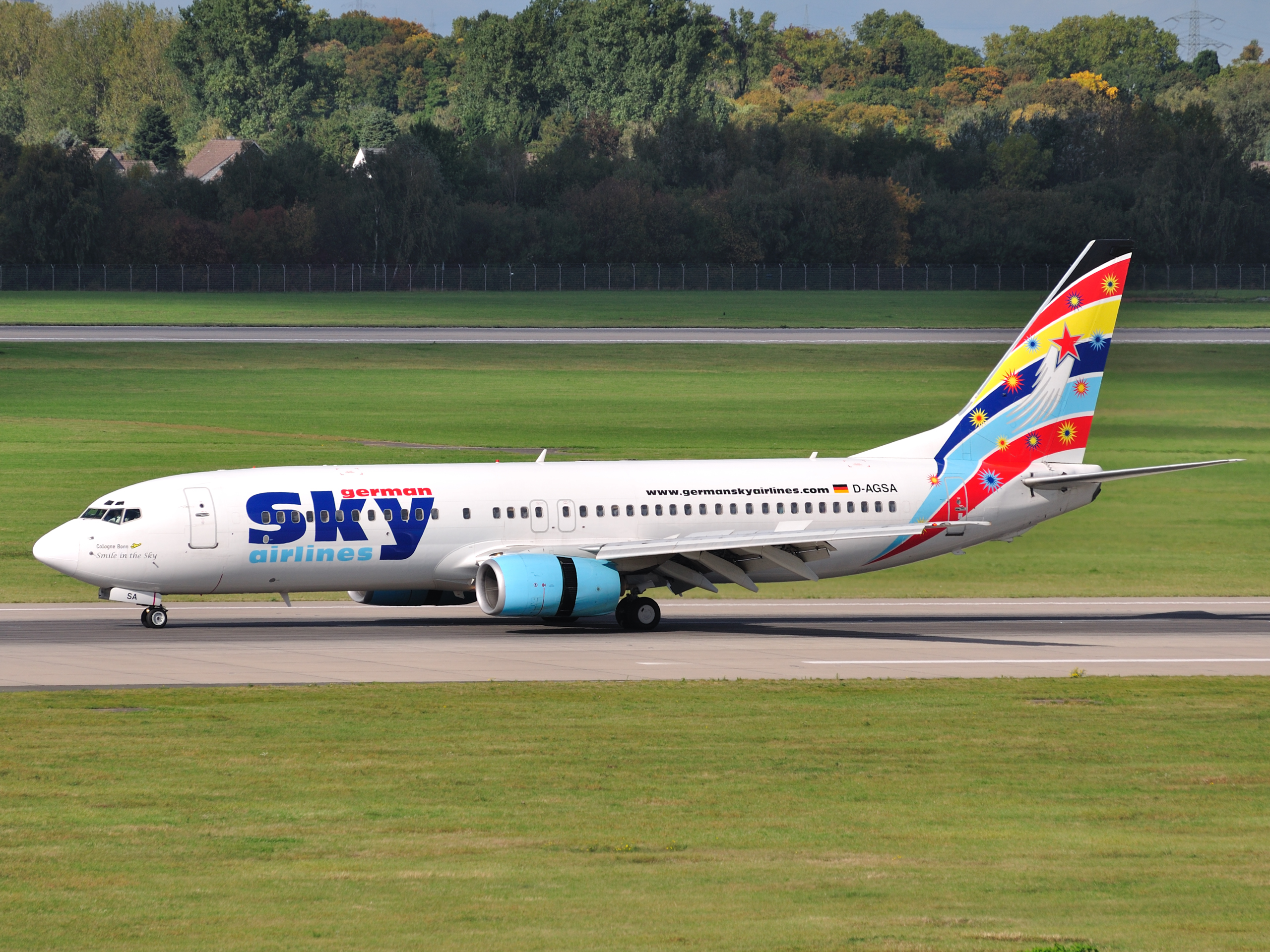
A Sky Airlines Boeing 737-800 (2012)

The airline also operated scheduled services to the following (as of December 2012)

Albania

- Tirana International Airport

Austria

- Graz Airport
- Linz Airport
- Salzburg Airport
- Vienna International Airport

Belgium

- Brussels Airport

Bosnia and Herzegovina

- Tuzla International Airport

Bulgaria

- Sofia Airport

Czech

- Prague – Václav Havel Airport

Denmark

- Copenhagen Airport

Estonia

- Tallinn – Lennart Meri Tallinn Airport

France

- Lyon-Saint Exupéry Airport
- Marseille Provence Airport
- Mulhouse – EuroAirport Basel-Mulhouse-Freiburg

Germany

- Berlin – Schönefeld Airport
- Cologne/Bonn – Cologne Bonn Airport
- Dortmund Airport
- Düsseldorf Airport
- Erfurt-Weimar Airport
- Frankfurt Airport
- Frankfurt-Hahn Airport
- Hamburg Airport
- Hannover-Langenhagen Airport
- Karlsruhe/Baden-Baden – Baden Airpark
- Leipzig/Halle – Leipzig/Halle Airport
- Munich Airport
- Münster/Osnabrück – Münster Osnabrück Airport
- Nuremberg Airport
- Paderborn Lippstadt Airport
- Saarbrücken Airport
- Stuttgart Airport
- Zweibrücken Airport

Iran

- Tehran – Imam Khomeini International Airport

Kazakhstan

- Almaty International Airport
- Aktobe Airport
- Karaganda – Sary-Arka Airport

Republic of Macedonia

- Skopje "Alexander the Great" Airport

Netherlands

- Amsterdam Airport Schiphol
- Eindhoven Airport

Poland

- Bydgoszcz Ignacy Jan Paderewski Airport
- Katowice International Airport
- Warsaw Chopin Airport
- Wrocław Airport

Norway

- Oslo Gardermoen Airport
- Trondheim – Trondheim Airport, Vaernes

Romania

- Bucharest – Henri Coandă International Airport
- Cluj-Napoca International Airport
- Timișoara – Traian Vuia International Airport

Slovakia

- Bratislava – M. R. Štefánik Airport

Slovenia

- Ljubljana – Ljubljana Jože Pučnik Airport

Switzerland

- Zürich Airport

Turkey

- Adana Şakirpaşa Airport
- Antalya Airport Hub
- Bodrum – Milas–Bodrum Airport Secondary hub
- Dalaman Airport Secondary hub
- Diyarbakır Airport
- Erzincan Airport
- Erzurum Airport
- Gaziantep – Oğuzeli Airport
- Istanbul – Sabiha Gökçen International Airport
- İzmir – Adnan Menderes Airport
- Kayseri – Erkilet International Airport
- Malatya Erhaç Airport
- Samsun-Çarşamba Airport
- Trabzon Airport
- Van – Van Ferit Melen Airport

== Fleet ==
As of February 2013, the Sky Airlines fleet consists of the following aircraft, which are all equipped with an all-economy class cabin layout:

Aircraft	In fleet	Order	Passengers	Notes
Boeing 737-400	1(stored)	-	170/150Y+12C	
Boeing 737-900ER	0		215	leased from ALAFCO
Total	1			
