= List of Iraqi Airways destinations =

Iraqi Airways Company, operating as Iraqi Airways, is the national carrier of Iraq, headquartered in Baghdad, with its main base at Baghdad International Airport. One of the oldest airlines in the Middle East, Iraqi Airways operates five domestic and 10 international routes in Africa, Asia and Europe since having resumed operations in 2003. Seven others were suspended in between. The airline was said to have ceased operations on 26 May 2010, partly due to claims for compensation from Kuwait arising out of the Gulf War, but continues to operate domestic and regional routes.

Iraqi Airways was founded in 1945 and is a member of the Arab Air Carriers' Organization. It operated its first flight on 29 January 1946. It has since expanded into a global airline covering a wide network of destinations in Africa, Asia, Europe, North and South America prior to the 1980–88 Iran–Iraq War as and the 1990 Iraqi invasion of Kuwait. Ensuing sanctions brought the airline's services to a halt, and random charters for Hajj were operated in defiance during the 90s.

The destination list shows airports that are served by Iraqi Airways as part of its regular scheduled passenger services. The list includes the city and country name, the airport codes of the International Air Transport Association (IATA airport code) and the International Civil Aviation Organization (ICAO airport code), and the airport name. Additionally, there are labels for airports that are the airline's base and terminated stations.

== List ==
Country	City	Airport	Notes	Refs
Armenia	Yerevan	Zvartnots International Airport		
Azerbaijan	Baku	Heydar Aliyev International Airport		
Belarus	Minsk	Minsk National Airport	Terminated	
Bahrain	Manama	Bahrain International Airport		
China	Beijing	Beijing Capital International Airport		
China	Guangzhou	Guangzhou Baiyun International Airport		
Denmark	Copenhagen	Copenhagen Airport	Terminated	
Egypt	Cairo	Cairo International Airport		
Egypt	Hurghada	Hurghada International Airport	Charter	
Egypt	Sharm El Sheikh	Sharm El Sheikh International Airport	Charter	
Germany	Berlin	Berlin Brandenburg Airport		
Germany	Frankfurt	Frankfurt Airport		
Germany	Munich	Munich Airport	Terminated	
India	Ahmedabad	Ahmedabad Airport	Seasonal	
India	Delhi	Indira Gandhi International Airport		
India	Mumbai	Chhatrapati Shivaji Maharaj International Airport		
Iran	Bandar Abbas	Bandar Abbas International Airport	Terminated	
Iran	Isfahan	Isfahan International Airport		
Iran	Kerman	Kerman Airport	Terminated	
Iran	Kish Island	Kish International Airport	Terminated	
Iran	Mashhad	Mashhad International Airport		
Iran	Rasht	Rasht Airport		
Iran	Tehran	Tehran Imam Khomeini International Airport		
Iran	Tehran	Tehran Mehrabad International Airport	Terminated	
Iraq	Baghdad	Baghdad International Airport	Hub	
Iraq	Basra	Basra International Airport	Base	
Iraq	Erbil	Erbil International Airport	Base	
Iraq	Kirkuk	Kirkuk International Airport		
Iraq	Mosul	Mosul International Airport		
Iraq	Najaf	Al Najaf International Airport		
Iraq	Nasiriyah	Nasiriyah Airport		
Iraq	Sulaymaniyah	Sulaymaniyah International Airport		
Jordan	Amman	Queen Alia International Airport		
Kuwait	Kuwait City	Kuwait International Airport		
Lebanon	Beirut	Beirut–Rafic Hariri International Airport		
Malaysia	Kuala Lumpur	Kuala Lumpur International Airport		
Norway	Oslo	Oslo Airport, Gardermoen	Terminated	
Oman	Muscat	Muscat International Airport	Seasonal charter	
Pakistan	Islamabad	Islamabad International Airport		
Pakistan	Karachi	International Airport		
Pakistan	Lahore	Allama Iqbal International Airport		
Russia	Moscow	Vnukovo International Airport		
Saudi Arabia	Jeddah	King Abdulaziz International Airport	Seasonal charter	
Saudi Arabia	Medina	Prince Mohammad bin Abdulaziz International Airport	Seasonal charter	
Saudi Arabia	Riyadh	King Khalid International Airport	Seasonal charter	
Sweden	Gothenburg	Göteborg Landvetter Airport		
Sweden	Malmö	Malmö Airport	Terminated	
Sweden	Stockholm	Stockholm Arlanda Airport		
Syria	Aleppo	Aleppo International Airport	Terminated	
Syria	Damascus	Damascus International Airport	Suspended	
Tunisia	Tunis	Tunis–Carthage International Airport		
Turkey	Adana	Adana Airport	Terminated	
Turkey	Ankara	Ankara Esenboğa Airport		
Turkey	Antalya	Antalya Airport		
Turkey	Batman	Batman Airport	Terminated	
Turkey	Gaziantep	Gaziantep Oğuzeli Airport		
Turkey	Istanbul	Istanbul International Airport		
Turkey	Istanbul	Istanbul Sabiha Gökçen International Airport		
Turkey	Trabzon	Trabzon Airport		
Turkey	Samsun	Samsun-Çarşamba Airport		
United Arab Emirates	Abu Dhabi	Zayed International Airport		
United Arab Emirates	Dubai	Dubai International Airport		
United Arab Emirates	Sharjah	Sharjah International Airport		
United Kingdom	London	Gatwick Airport	Terminated	
United Kingdom	London	Heathrow Airport	Terminated	
United Kingdom	Manchester	Manchester Airport	Terminated	
