= Domestic flight =

Commercial airplane flight between airports within a country

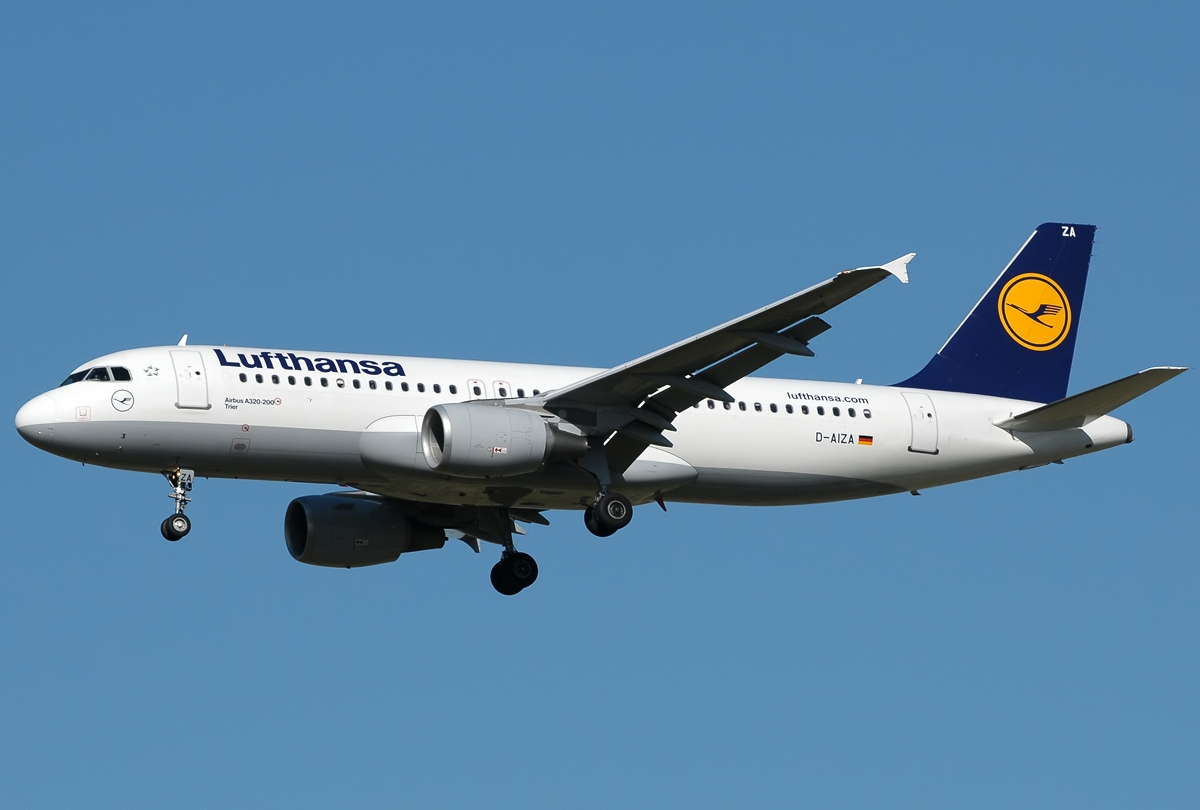
Airbus A320, an aircraft widely used in domestic flights.

A domestic flight is a form of commercial flight within civil aviation where the departure and the arrival take place in the same country.

Airports serving domestic flights only are known as domestic airports.

Domestic flights are generally cheaper and shorter than most international flights. Some international flights may be cheaper than domestic ones due to the short distance between the pair of cities in different countries, and also because domestic flights might, in smaller countries, mainly be used by high paying business travellers, while leisure travellers use road or rail domestically.

Domestic flights are the only sector of aviation not exhibiting a global long term growth trend due to many smaller countries increasingly replacing short domestic routes with high speed rail; that said, most of the busiest air routes in the world are domestic flights.

Medium-sized countries like the Netherlands have very few domestic flights; most of them are merely a leg between small regional airports such as Groningen Airport Eelde, Maastricht Aachen Airport and Rotterdam The Hague Airport to pick up passengers from various parts of the country before proceeding to international destinations. In June 2013, Dutch MP Liesbeth van Tongeren (GreenLeft, previously Greenpeace Netherlands director) proposed to prohibit domestic flights in the Netherlands with the argument that they are needlessly inefficient, polluting and expensive, but Environment Secretary Wilma Mansveld (Labour Party) said such a ban would violate EU regulations that allow airlines to fly domestically. In larger countries such as France, Air Tahiti Nui Flight 64, which was conducted between Faa'a in Tahiti, Polynesia and Paris in Metropolitan France in 2020, was the world's longest domestic flight, as Polynesia is an overseas collectivity of France. The aircraft traveled over fifteen and a half thousand miles. Some political debaters propose short-haul flight bans in a number of countries.

== Largest domestic markets ==
millions of seats
Rank	Country	2018	growth
1	US (Note: 29% of all global domestic capacity)	958.1	4.4%
2	China	685.1	9.8%
3	India	169.9	15.7%
4	Indonesia	148.4	4.0%
5	Japan	146.5	1.0%
6	Brazil	119.6	3.4%
7	Australia	79.4	0.5%
8	Russia	74.9	9.8%
9	Canada	65.6	5.2%
10	Turkey	65.1	5.2%

== See also ==
- Airliner
- Cabotage
- Commercial aviation
- Domestic airport
- International flight
- Non-stop flight
- Private aviation
