= Balıkesir Koca Seyit Airport =

Balıkesir Koca Seyit Airport Balıkesir Koca Seyit Havalimanı
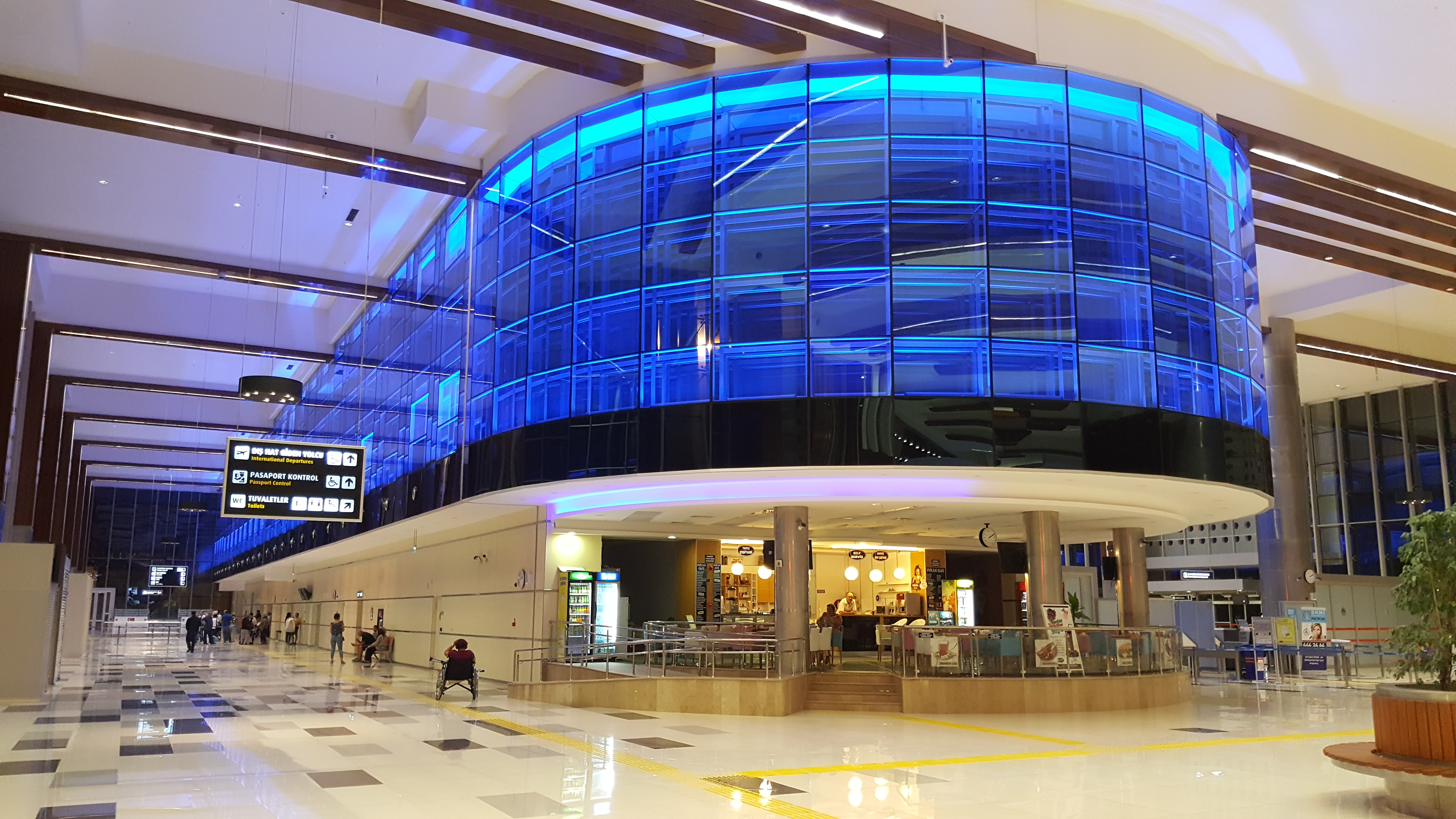
- IATA: EDO; ICAO: LTFD

Summary
- Airport type: Public
- Owner: General Directorate of State Airports (DHMİ)
- Operator: General Directorate of State Airports (DHMİ)
- Serves: Balıkesir, Turkey
- Location: Edremit, Balıkesir, Turkey
- Opened: 1997; 29 years ago (initial opening); 19 June 2010; 16 years ago (current facilities)
- Elevation AMSL: 50 ft (15 m)
- Coordinates: 39°33′16″N 27°00′49″E
- Website: www.dhmi.gov.tr

Map
- Location of airport in Turkey EDO (Europe)

Runways
Direction	Length		Surface
Direction	m	ft	Surface
05/23	3,000	9.842	Concrete

Statistics (2025)
- Annual passenger capacity: 3,000,000
- Passengers: 286,257
- Passenger change 2024–25: ▲8%
- Aircraft movements: 31,076
- Movements change 2024–25: ▲21%

Balıkesir Koca Seyit Airport (IATA: EDO, ICAO: LTFD), previously known as Balıkesir Edremit Körfez Airport, is an airport located south of Edremit in the Balıkesir Province of Turkey. The airport's name was changed to Balıkesir Koca Seyit Airport in July 2012 by the Turkish Government.

== Airlines and destinations ==
The following airlines operate regular scheduled and charter flights at Balıkesir Edremit Airport:

Airlines	Destinations
AJet	Ankara, Istanbul–Sabiha Gökçen
Corendon Airlines	Seasonal: Cologne/Bonn, Düsseldorf
Pegasus Airlines	Ankara, Istanbul–Sabiha Gökçen
SunExpress	Seasonal: Düsseldorf, Hannover, Munich, Stuttgart
Turkish Airlines	Istanbul

== Statistics ==
Balıkesir–Koca Seyit Airport passenger traffic statistics
Year (months)	Domestic	% change	International	% change	Total	% change
2025	230,146	▼2%	56,111	▲94%	286,257	▲8%
2024	235,219	▲1%	28,985	▲1%	264,204	▲1%
2023	231,856	▲11%	28,677	▲120%	260,533	▲18%
2022	208,362	▼20%	13,031	▲250%	221,393	▼17%
2021	261,828	▲70%	3,727	▼29%	265,555	▲67%
2020	153,777	▼56%	5,249	▲17%	159,026	▼55%
2019	349,883	▼31%	4,498	▼57%	354,381	▼31%
2018	503,558	▲18%	10,452	▲9%	514,010	▲18%
2017	426,705	▲21%	9,556	▼15%	436,261	▲20%
2016	353,567	▲13%	11,181	▲15%	364,748	▲13%
2015	311,785	▲56%	9,735	▲37%	321,520	▲56%
2014	199,280	▲120%	7,108	▲613%	206,388	▲125%
2013	90,581	▲96%	997	▲140%	91,578	▲97%
2012	46,180	▼19%	415	▼85%	46,595	▼22%
2011	56,933	▲53%	2,723	-	59,656	▲60%
2010	37,236	-	-	-	37,236	-
2009	-	▼100%	-	-	-	▼100%
2008	17,399	▼20%	-	-	17,399	▼20%
2007	21,806	Steady	-	Steady	21,806	Steady
