= Hatay Airport =

International airport in Turkey

Hatay Airport Hatay Havalimanı
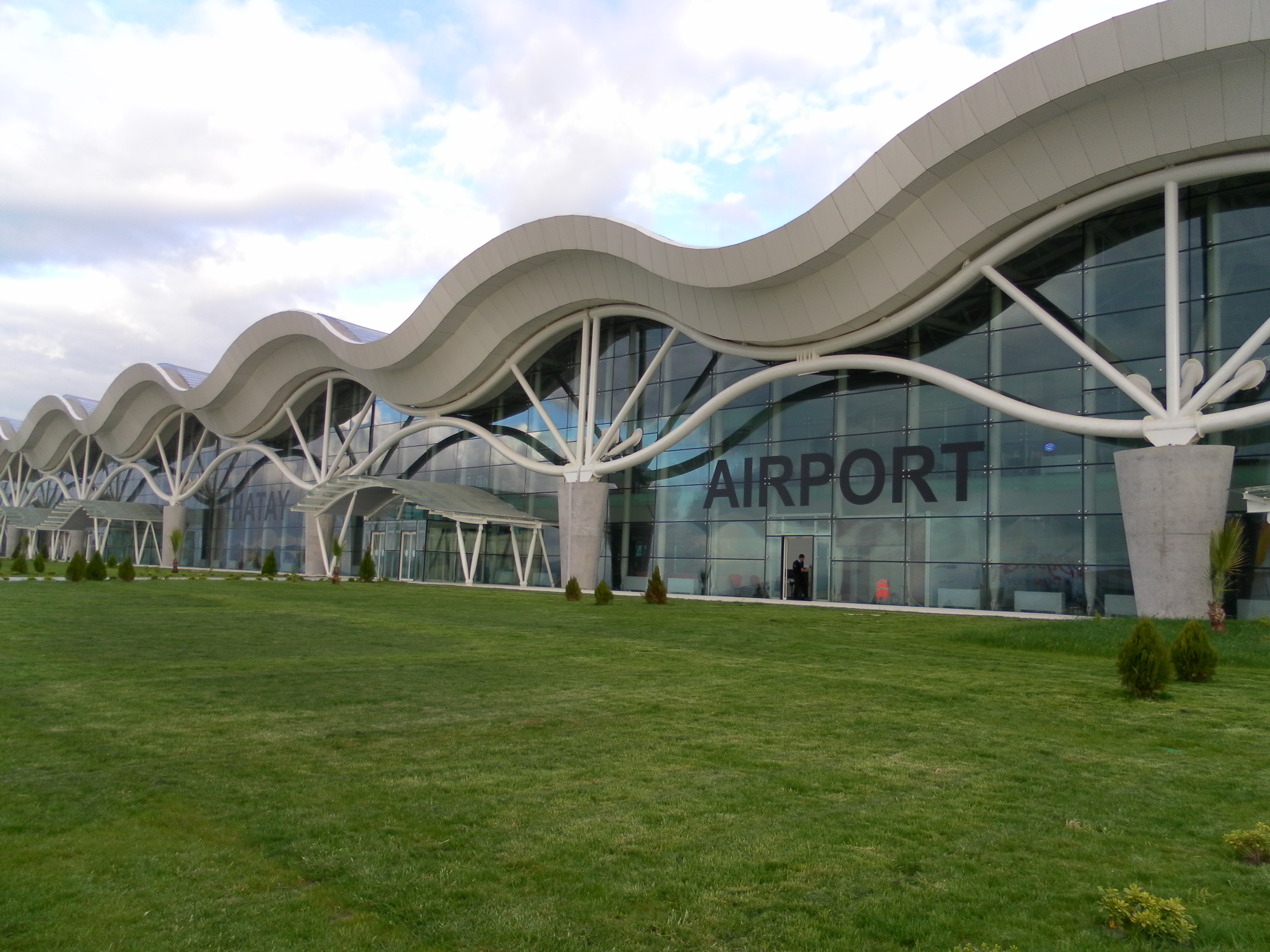
- IATA: HTY; ICAO: LTDA

Summary
- Airport type: Public
- Operator: General Directorate of State Airports (DHMİ)
- Serves: Hatay, Turkey
- Location: Antakya, Hatay, Turkey
- Opened: 9 December 2007; 18 years ago
- Elevation AMSL: 270 ft (82 m)
- Coordinates: 36°21′46″N 36°16′56″E
- Website: www.dhmi.gov.tr

Map
- Location of airport in Turkey HTY (Europe)

Runways
Direction	Length		Surface
Direction	ft	m	Surface
22/04	6,830	2,082	Asphalt

Statistics (2025)
- Annual passenger capacity: 4,000,000
- Passengers: 506,499
- Passenger change 2024–25: ▲75%
- Aircraft movements: 3,907
- Movements change 2024–25: ▲56%

Hatay Airport (IATA: HTY, ICAO: LTDA) (Turkish: Hatay Havalimanı) is an international airport in Hatay Province, Turkey, serving the cities of Antakya (25 km (16 mi) by road) and Iskenderun (45 km (28 mi)). Built in what used to be the center of the now drained Lake Amik, it was inaugurated in December 2007.

The airport's only runway suffered catastrophic damage during the earthquake in February 2023, which caused the airport to close for traffic.

== Airlines and destinations ==
The following airlines operate regular scheduled and charter flights at Hatay Airport:

Airlines	Destinations
AJet	Ankara, Istanbul–Sabiha Gökçen
flynas	Riyadh
Pegasus Airlines	Ercan, Istanbul–Sabiha Gökçen
Turkish Airlines	Istanbul

== Traffic statistics ==
Hatay International Airport Passenger Traffic Statistics
Year (months)	Domestic	% change	International	% change	Total	% change
2025	478,185	▲66%	28,314	-	506,499	▲75%
2024	288,706	▲70%	-	▼100%	288,706	▲57%
2023	170,081	▼82%	13,827	▼90%	183,908	▼83%
2022	920,407	▲7%	137,807	▲302%	1,058,214	▲18%
2021	864,055	▲50%	34,322	▼42%	898,377	▲41%
2020	576,273	▼40%	59,185	▼77%	635,458	▼48%
2019	958,106	▼10%	255,164	▼1%	1,213,870	▼8%
2018	1,066,555	▲6%	258,454	▼7%	1,325,009	▲3%
2017	1,007,385	▲8%	277,172	▲4%	1,284,557	▲7%
2016	935,969	▲5%	267,461	▼5%	1,203,430	▲3%
2015	889,808	▲8%	281,943	▼4%	1,171,751	▲5%
2014	820,665	▲10%	293,264	▲35%	1,113,929	▲15%
2013	747,749	▲48%	216,958	▲38%	964,707	▲45%
2012	506,433	▼9%	157,459	▲16%	663,892	▼4%
2011	553,527	▲26%	136,059	▼1%	689,586	▲20%
2010	437,793	▲86%	136,820	▲51%	574,613	▲77%
2009	234,828	▲65%	90,479	▲354%	325,307	▲101%
2008	142,186	▲4695%	19,942	-	162,128	▲5368%
2007	2,965	Steady	-	Steady	2,965	Steady

^1: 2007 statistics correspond to the last month of 2007 since the opening of the airport.

== Ground transport ==
Antakya and İskenderun are connected by coaches and taxis.
