= Batman Airport =

Batman Airport Batman Havalimanı
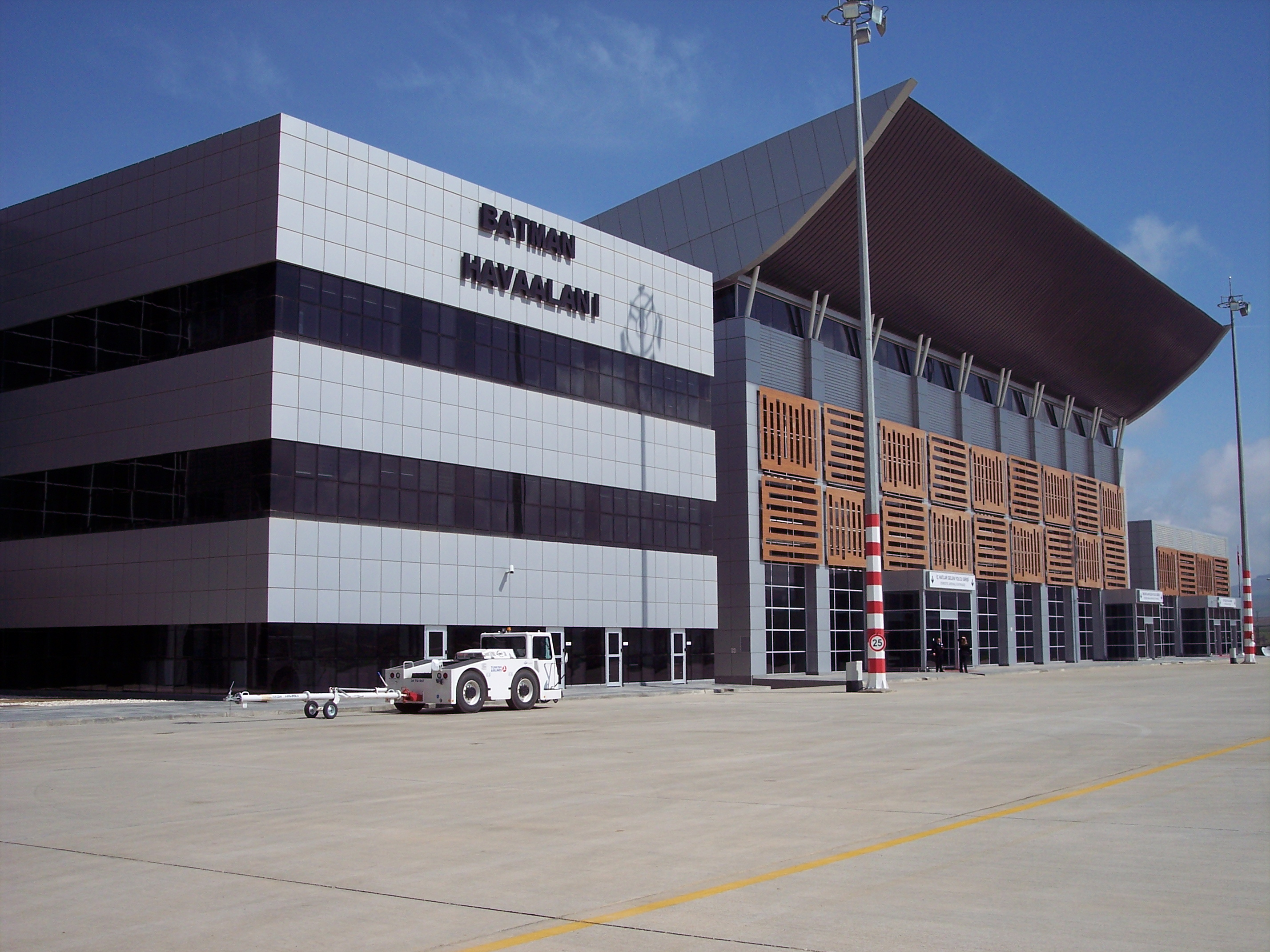
- IATA: BAL; ICAO: LTCJ

Summary
- Airport type: Public / military
- Operator: General Directorate of State Airports (DHMİ)
- Serves: Batman, Turkey
- Location: Batman, Turkey
- Opened: 1998; 28 years ago
- Coordinates: 37°55′56″N 41°06′59″E
- Website: www.dhmi.gov.tr

Map
- Location of airport in Turkey BAL (Europe)

Runways
Direction	Length		Surface
Direction	ft	m	Surface
02/20	10,000	3,048	Concrete

Statistics (2025)
- Annual passenger capacity: 2,000,000
- Passengers: 737,301
- Passenger change 2024–25: ▲14%
- Aircraft movements: 4,444
- Movements change 2024–25: ▲17%

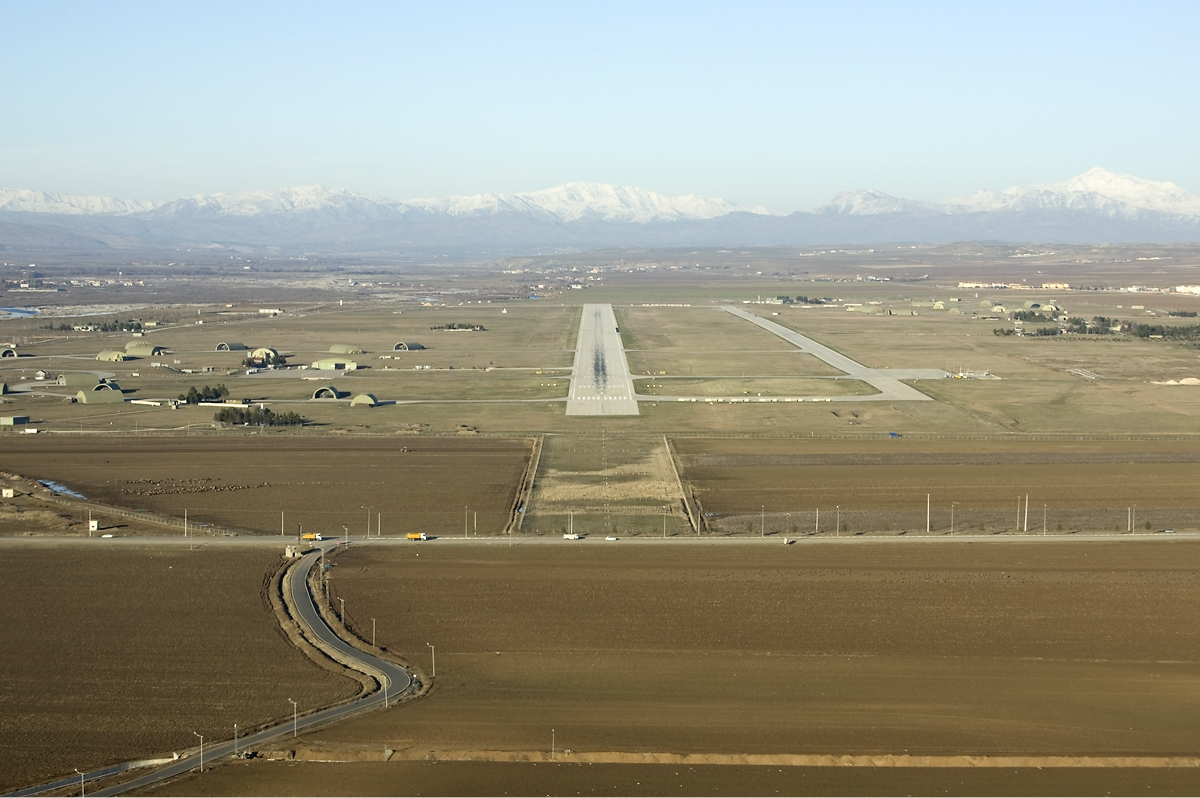
Aerial view of the airport with runway

Batman Airport is an airport in Batman, Turkey (IATA: BAL, ICAO: LTCJ).

== Airlines and destinations ==
The following airlines operate regular scheduled and charter flights at Batman Airport:

Airlines	Destinations
AJet	Ankara, Istanbul–Sabiha Gökçen
Pegasus Airlines	Istanbul–Sabiha Gökçen
Turkish Airlines	Istanbul

== Traffic statistics ==
Batman Airport passenger traffic statistics
Year (months)	Domestic	% change	International	% change	Total	% change
2025	732,771	▲14%	4,530	▼152%	737,301	▲14%
2024	642,288	▲17%	1,801	▼8%	644,089	▲17%
2023	547,897	▲29%	1,949	▲1244%	549,846	▲29%
2022	424,552	▼19%	145	-	424,697	▼19%
2021	526,546	▲42%	-	▼100%	526,546	▲42%
2020	370,430	▼29%	1,153	▼8%	371,583	▼29%
2019	522,761	▼21%	1,249	▼59%	524,010	▼21%
2018	662,285	▲28%	3,021	▲11%	665,306	▲28%
2017	516,612	▲18%	2,724	▲43%	519,336	▲18%
2016	437,732	▲122%	1,902	▲443%	439,634	▲123%
2015	197,083	▼55%	350	▲4%	197,433	▼55%
2014	434,511	▲3%	338	▲3%	434,849	▲3%
2013	419,852	▼16%	318	-	420,170	▼16%
2012	497,418	▲186%	-	-	497,418	▲186%
2011	173,943	▼6%	-	-	173,943	▼6%
2010	185,888	▲12%	-	-	185,888	▲12%
2009	165,482	▲16%	-	-	165,482	▲16%
2008	143,290	▲47%	-	-	143,290	▲47%
2007	97,247	Steady	-	Steady	97,247	Steady
