= Sabiha Gökçen International Airport =

Secondary airport serving Istanbul, Turkey

Istanbul Sabiha Gökçen International Airport İstanbul Sabiha Gökçen Uluslararası Havalimanı

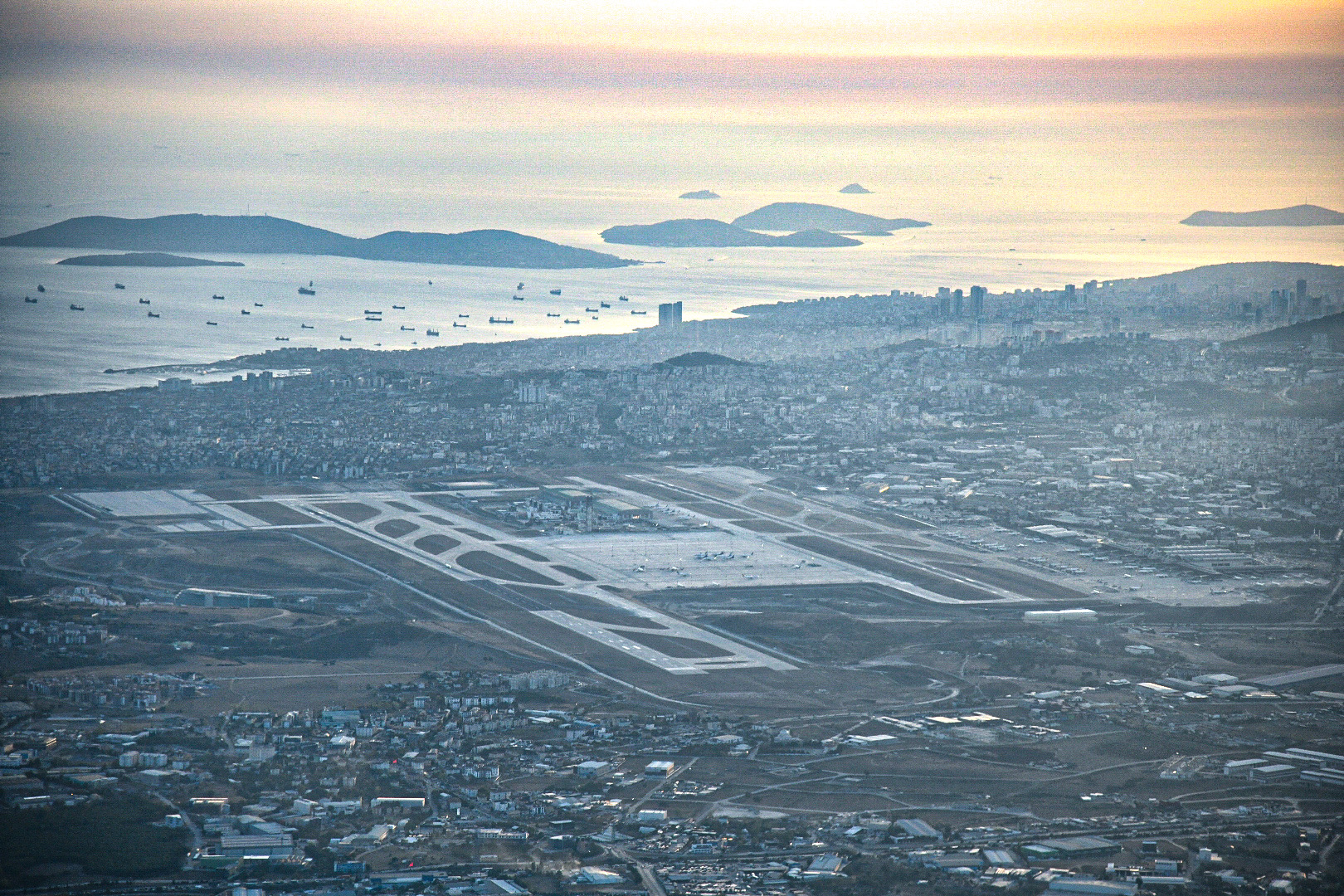
- IATA: SAW; ICAO: LTFJ

Summary
- Airport type: Public
- Owner: HEAŞ (Airport Management & Aeronautical Industries Inc)
- Operator: Malaysia Airports
- Serves: Istanbul, Turkey
- Location: Pendik, Istanbul, Turkey
- Opened: 8 January 2001; 25 years ago
- Operating base for: AJet; Pegasus Airlines
- Time zone: TRT (UTC+3)
- Elevation AMSL: 95 m (312 ft)
- Coordinates: 40°53′54″N 29°18′33″E
- Public transit access: Istanbul Metro: M4Sabiha Gökçen Havalimanı station
- Website: www.sabihagokcen.aero

Map
- Location of airport in Istanbul province SAW/LTFJ (Turkey) SAW/LTFJ (Asia) SAW/LTFJ (North Atlantic)

Runways
Direction	Length		Surface
Direction	m	ft	Surface
06L/24R	3,000	9,843	Concrete
06R/24L	3,500	11,483	Concrete

Statistics (2025)
- Annual passenger capacity: 46,000,000
- Passengers: 48,407,318
- Passenger change 2024–25: ▲17%
- Aircraft movements: 275,537
- Movements change 2024–25: ▲14%
- Source: Turkish AIP at EUROCONTROL; Passenger Traffic, ACI Europe

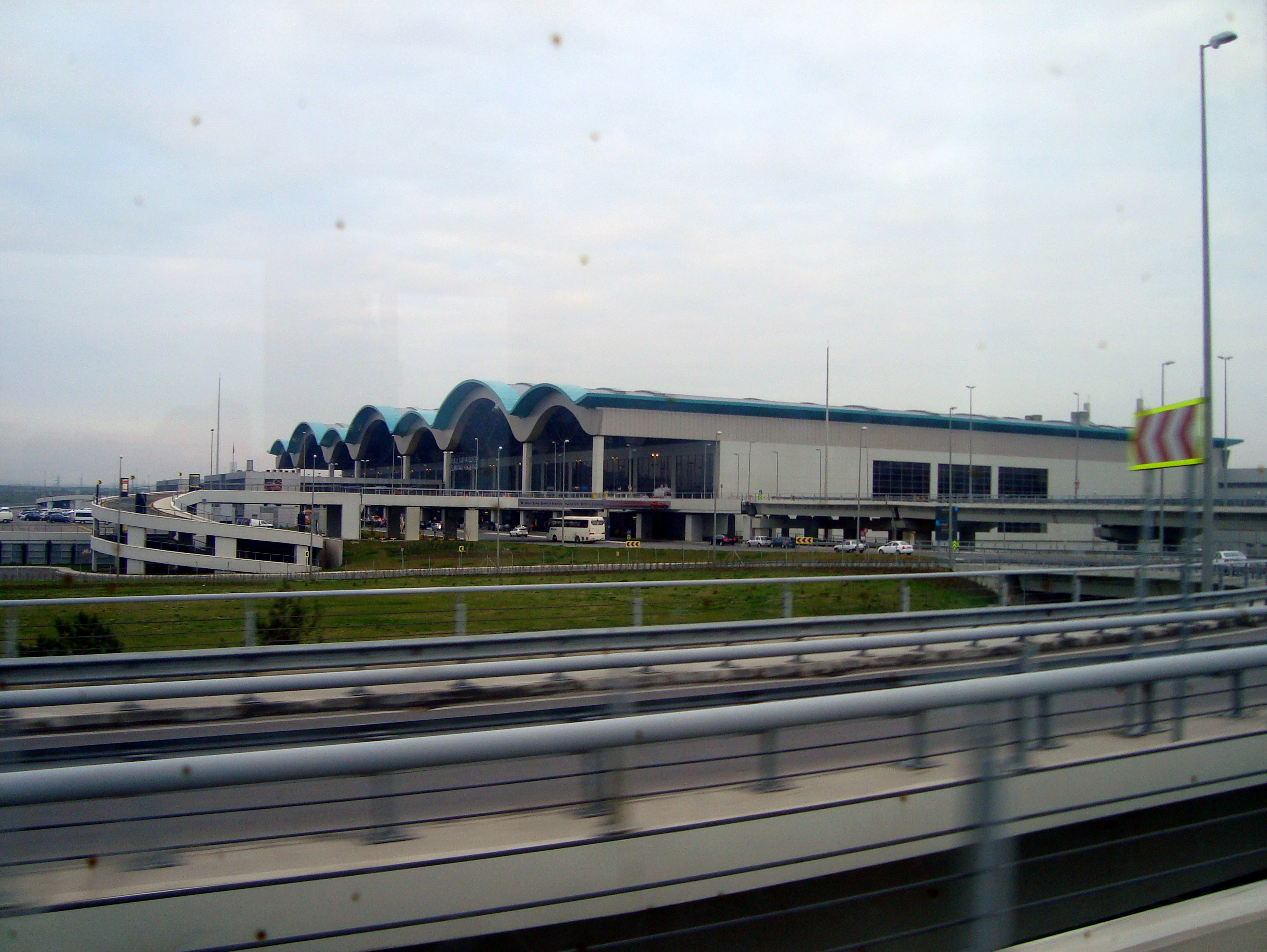
Terminal building

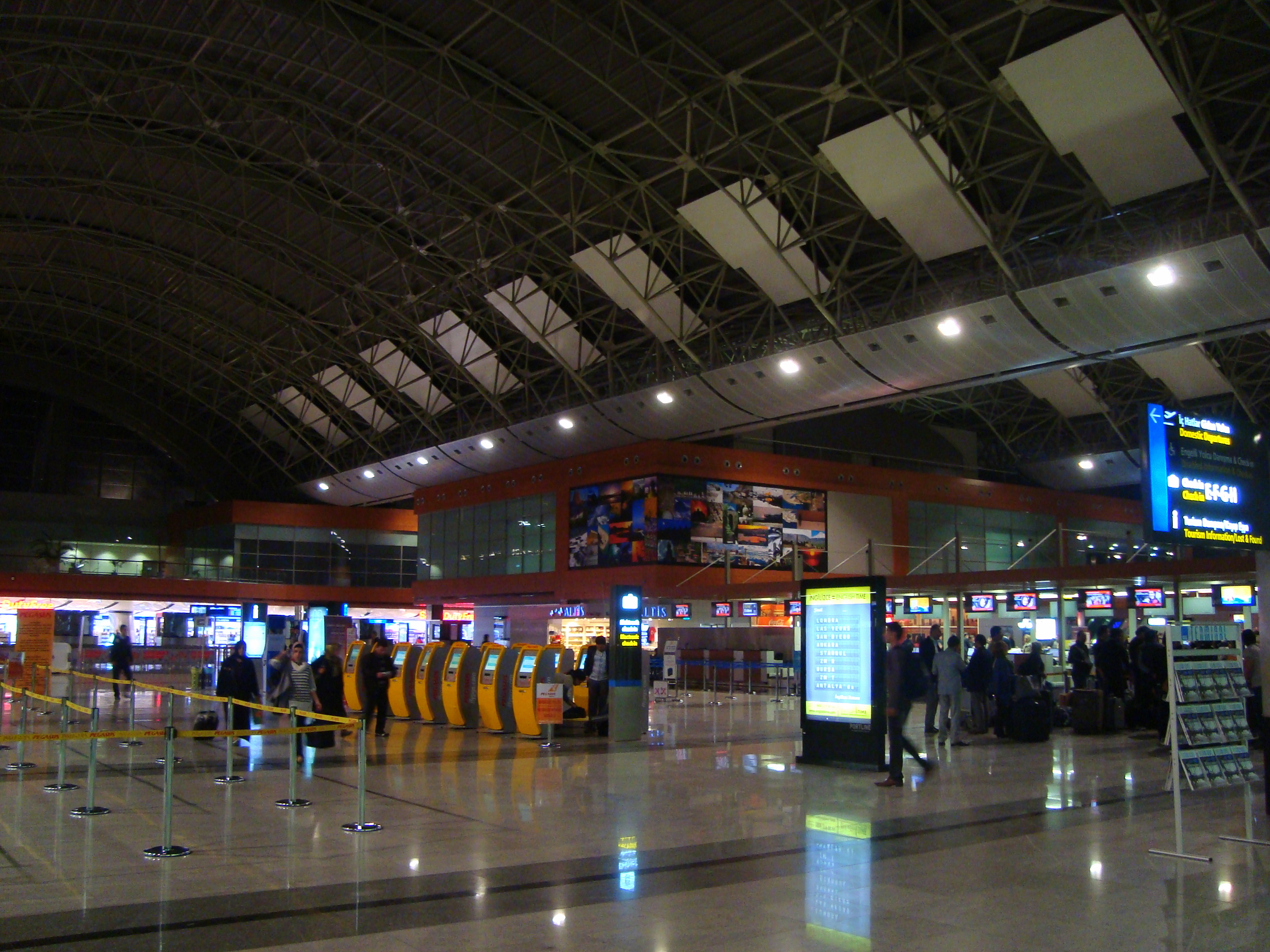
Check-in area

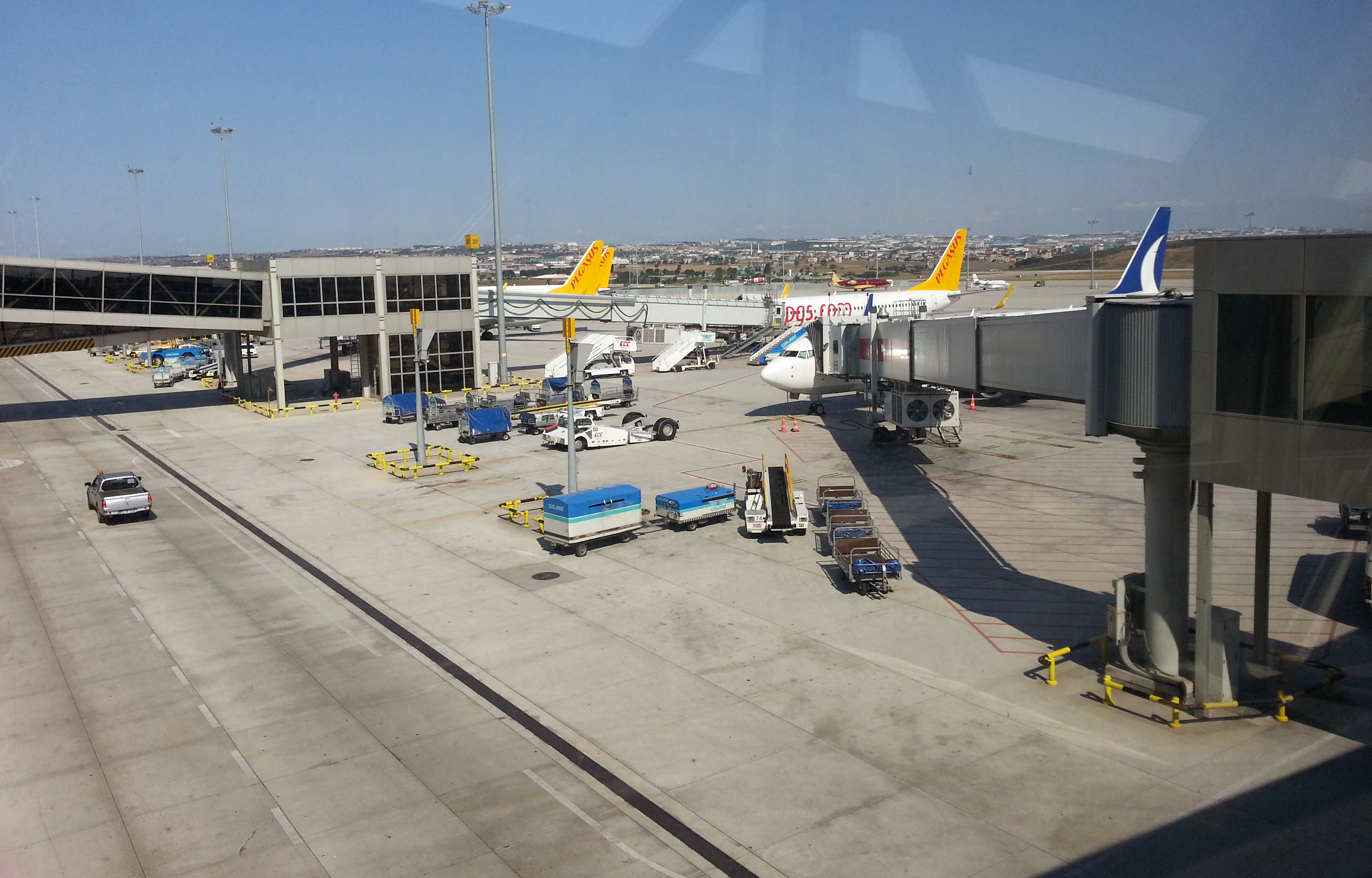
View of the apron

Istanbul Sabiha Gökçen International Airport (IATA: SAW, ICAO: LTFJ) is the secondary international airport serving Istanbul, Turkey. Located 32 km (20 mi) southeast of the city centre, Sabiha Gökçen Airport is in the Asian part of the transcontinental city and serves as the operating base for AJet and Pegasus Airlines.

The airport is named after Sabiha Gökçen, adoptive daughter of Mustafa Kemal Atatürk and the first female fighter pilot in the world. The airport's name has roused controversy because of Sabiha Gökçen's involvement in the Dersim massacre. Although Istanbul Airport, located 63 km (39 mi) west of the European side of Istanbul, is larger, it handled over 48.4 million passengers in 2025, making it the second-busiest airport in Turkey, and forty sixth-busiest airport in the world.

== Overview ==
=== Foundation ===
The airport was built because Atatürk Airport (located on the European side) was not large enough to meet the booming passenger demands (both domestic and international). The airport opened on 8 January 2001. In June 2007, Turkish conglomerate Limak Holding, India's GMR Group and Malaysia Airport Holding Berhad (MAHB) consortium gained the contract for upgrading and maintaining the airport. In mid-2008, ground was broken to upgrade the international terminal to handle 25 million passengers annually. The new terminal was inaugurated on 31 October 2009.

SAW's international terminal capacity originally was 3 million passengers per year and the domestic terminal capacity was 0.5 million passengers per year. In 2010, Sabiha Gökçen airport handled 11,189,678 passengers, a 72% increase compared to 2009. The airport was planning (in 2010) to host 25 million passengers by 2023, but has already received and handled more than 35 million passengers by 2019.

=== Expansion ===
In September 2010, the airport was voted the World's Best Airport at the World Low Cost Airlines Congress in London and received the award. The other awards received by the airport in 2010 were: Turkey's Most Successful Tourism Investment 2010, the highly commended award from Routes Europe, and the Airport Traffic Growth Award by Airline News & Network Analysis.

A second runway was inaugurated on 25 December 2023. The addition of this runway will increase the hourly capacity from 40 to 80 aircraft movements, making the airport hope for double the capacity. It is also planned to build new passenger terminals between the two runways.

== Facilities ==
=== Terminal ===
The new terminal building with a 25 million annual passenger capacity serves domestic and international flights under one roof. It is equipped with 112 check-in, 24 online check-in counters as well as a VIP building and apron viewing CIP halls with business lounges. The terminal additionally features a 400 m^{2} (4,300 sq ft) conference centre, a 5,000 m^{2} (54,000 sq ft) food court and a duty-free shopping area with a ground of 4,500 square metres (48,000 sq ft). At the international departures area, on the airside, an hourly hotel and lounge became operational in January 2020 as well.

== Name controversy ==
The naming of the airport after Sabiha Gökçen has been controversial because of her role as a combat pilot during the Dersim massacre. Political scientist Ayhan Kaya noted that the name was regarded as "hurtful to Kurds", linking the controversy to Gökçen's participation in the bombing of Dersim. Researcher Nisan Alıcı has similarly noted that public campaigns were launched to remove Gökçen's name from the airport because of her participation in the carpet bombing of Dersim.

In November 2011, AKP deputy Mehmet Metiner proposed changing the airport's name as "a first step toward an apology" over the massacre. On 4 May 2012, members of the Dersim Associations Federation demonstrated outside the airport and demanded that Gökçen's name be removed because of her role in the massacre. In July 2013, BDP deputy Altan Tan introduced a bill in the Grand National Assembly of Turkey that would have renamed it Hacı Bektaş-ı Veli Airport, but the proposal remained in committee and later lapsed.

Sociologist Deniz Yonucu described the airport's naming in the context of the "politics of naming" affecting Alevis, citing criticism of commemorating Gökçen because of her aerial bombardment of Dersim civilians. Political scientist Pınar Dinç also notes that the removal of the Gökçen's name from airports, schools and neighbourhoods can become part of a wider effort to reconcile with and recognize the Dersim massacre in Turkey.

== Airlines and destinations ==
=== Passenger ===
The following airlines operate regular scheduled and charter flights to and from Sabiha Gökçen International Airport:

Airlines	Destinations
Air Arabia	Cairo, Casablanca, Sharjah, Tangier
AirAsia X	Kuala Lumpur–International
AJet	Adana/Mersin, Adiyaman, Ağrı, Aleppo, Algiers, Almaty (begins 5 January 2027), Amsterdam, Antalya, Astana (begins 7 January 2027), Baghdad, Bahrain, Baku, Barcelona, Basel/Mulhouse, Basra, Batman, Belgrade, Bergamo, Berlin, Beirut, Bishkek, Bodrum, Brussels, Budapest, Cairo, Chișinău, Cologne/Bonn, Copenhagen, Dalaman, Damascus, Dammam, Denizli, Diyarbakır, Dubai–International, Düsseldorf, Edremit, Elazığ, Erbil, Ercan, Erzincan, Erzurum, Frankfurt, Ganja, Gaziantep, Geneva, Giza, Hamburg, Hannover, Hatay, Hurghada, Iași, Iğdır, İzmir, Jeddah, Kars, Kayseri, Konya, Kuwait City, London–Stansted, Lyon, Malatya, Mardin, Medina, Moscow–Vnukovo, Munich, Nakhchivan, Nevşehir, Ordu/Giresun, Paris–Charles de Gaulle, Prague, Pristina, Riyadh, Rize/Artvin, Rome–Fiumicino, Rotterdam/The Hague, Saint Petersburg, Samsun, Şanlıurfa, Sarajevo, Sharjah, Sharm El Sheikh, Şırnak, Sivas, Skopje, Stockholm–Arlanda, Stuttgart, Sulaimaniyah, Şymkent, Tbilisi, Tehran–Imam Khomeini (suspended), Tirana, Tokat, Trabzon, Van, Vienna, Zurich
Azerbaijan Airlines	Baku (ends 3 January 2027)
FlyArystan	Türkistan
Fly Baghdad	Baghdad
Flydubai	Dubai–International
Flynas	Dammam, Gassim, Jeddah, Riyadh
Iraqi Airways	Baghdad
Jazeera Airways	Kuwait City
Kam Air	Kabul
Kuwait Airways	Kuwait City
Nile Air	Cairo
Pegasus Airlines	Abu Dhabi, Adana/Mersin, Adıyaman, Alexandria, Algiers, Alicante, Aleppo, Amasya/Merzifon, Amman–Queen Alia, Amsterdam, Andizhan (begins 18 December 2026), Ankara, Antalya, Aqtau, Aqtöbe, Astana, Athens, Atyrau, Baghdad, Bahrain, Baku, Barcelona, Basel/Mulhouse, Basra, Batman, Batumi, Beirut, Belgrade, Bergamo, Berlin, Bilbao, Bratislava, Birmingham, Bishkek, Bodrum, Bologna, Bremen, Bristol, Bucharest–Otopeni, Budapest, Bukhara (begins 14 December 2026), Casablanca, Charleroi, Chisinau, Cluj-Napoca, Cologne/Bonn, Copenhagen, Dalaman, Dammam, Denizli, Diyarbakır, Doha, Dushanbe, Dortmund, Dubai–International, Dublin, Düsseldorf, Edinburgh, Edremit, Eindhoven, Elazığ, Erbil, Ercan, Erzincan, Erzurum, Frankfurt, Ganja, Gaziantep, Gazipaşa/Alanya, Geneva, Giza, Graz, Grozny, Hamburg, Hannover, Hatay, Helsinki, Hurghada, Iğdır, İzmir, Jeddah, Kahramanmaraş, Karachi, Kars, Kastamonu, Kayseri, Konya, Kutaisi, Kuwait City, Ljubljana, London–Gatwick, London–Stansted, Luxor, Lyon, Madrid, Malatya, Manchester, Mardin, Marsa Alam, Marseille, Mashhad, Medina, Munich, Muş, Muscat, Nice, Nuremberg, Oral, Ordu/Giresun, Osh, Oslo, Paris–Charles de Gaulle, Paris–Orly, Podgorica, Prague, Pristina, Ras Al Khaimah, Riyadh, Rize/Artvin, Rome–Fiumicino, Rotterdam/The Hague, Saint Petersburg, Samsun, Şanlıurfa, Sarajevo, Seville, Sharjah, Sharm El Sheikh, Shiraz, Sinop, Sivas, Skopje, Sofia, Stockholm–Arlanda, Stuttgart, Sulaimaniyah, Şymkent, Tbilisi, Termez (begins 1 March 2027), Tirana, Trabzon, Tripoli–Mitiga, Van, Venice, Vienna, Yerevan, Zagreb, Zurich; Seasonal: Mytilene, Rhodes
Qatar Airways	Doha
SalamAir	Muscat

=== Cargo ===
Airlines	Destinations
Cargolux	Luxembourg
Ethiopian Cargo	Addis Ababa
MNG Airlines	Leipzig/Halle, Paris–Charles de Gaulle

== Statistics ==
İstanbul–Sabiha Gökçen International Airport passenger traffic statistics
Year	Domestic	% change	International	% change	Total	% change
2026(Oct.)	19,492,444	▲10%	23,146,131	▲3.4%	42,638,575	▲6%
2025	21,193,145	▲9%	27,214,173	▲24%	48,407,318	▲17%
2024	19,503,828	▲12%	21,945,216	▲13%	41,449,044	▲13%
2023	17,473,660	▲15%	19,351,764	▲25%	36,825,424	▲20%
2022	15,239,756	▼5%	15,498,098	▲76%	30,737,854	▲23%
2021	16,095,763	▲38%	8,805,144	▲67%	24,900,907	▲47%
2020	11,687,578	▼46%	5,263,612	▼63%	16,951,190	▼52%
2019	21,505,088	▼4%	14,055,522	▲21%	35,560,610	▲4%
2018	22,514,048	▲7%	11,619,569	▲13%	34,133,617	▲9%
2017	21,075,833	▲4%	10,310,205	▲9%	31,386,038	▲6%
2016	20,196,261	▲9%	9,471,592	▼1%	29,667,853	▲6%
2015	18,525,649	▲24%	9,583,089	▲12%	28,108,738	▲20%
2014	14,955,571	▲25%	8,539,075	▲30%	23,494,646	▲27%
2013	11,928,074	▲23%	6,593,688	▲33%	18,521,762	▲26%
2012	9,710,105	▲12%	4,975,947	▲13%	14,686,052	▲12%
2011	8,704,249	▲16%	4,420,421	▲19%	13,124,670	▲17%
2010	7,489,479	▲66%	3,700,199	▲84%	11,189,678	▲72%
2009	4,510,895	▲63%	2,006,591	▲32%	6,517,486	▲52%
2008	2,764,856	▲9%	1,516,337	▲27%	4,281,193	▲15%
2007	2,528,549	▲17%	1,191,946	▲56%	3,720,495	▲28%
2006	2,153,561	▲285%	762,893	▲66%	2,916,454	▲186%
2005	559,824	▲5323%	459,922	▲96%	1,019,746	▲315%
2004	10,323	▲265%	235,278	▲52%	245,601	▲56%
2003	2,826	▼5%	154,346	▲21%	157,172	▲21%
2002	2,975	▼75%	127,302	▲259%	130,277	▲175%
2001	11,924	Steady	35,453	Steady	47,377	Steady

== Ground transport ==
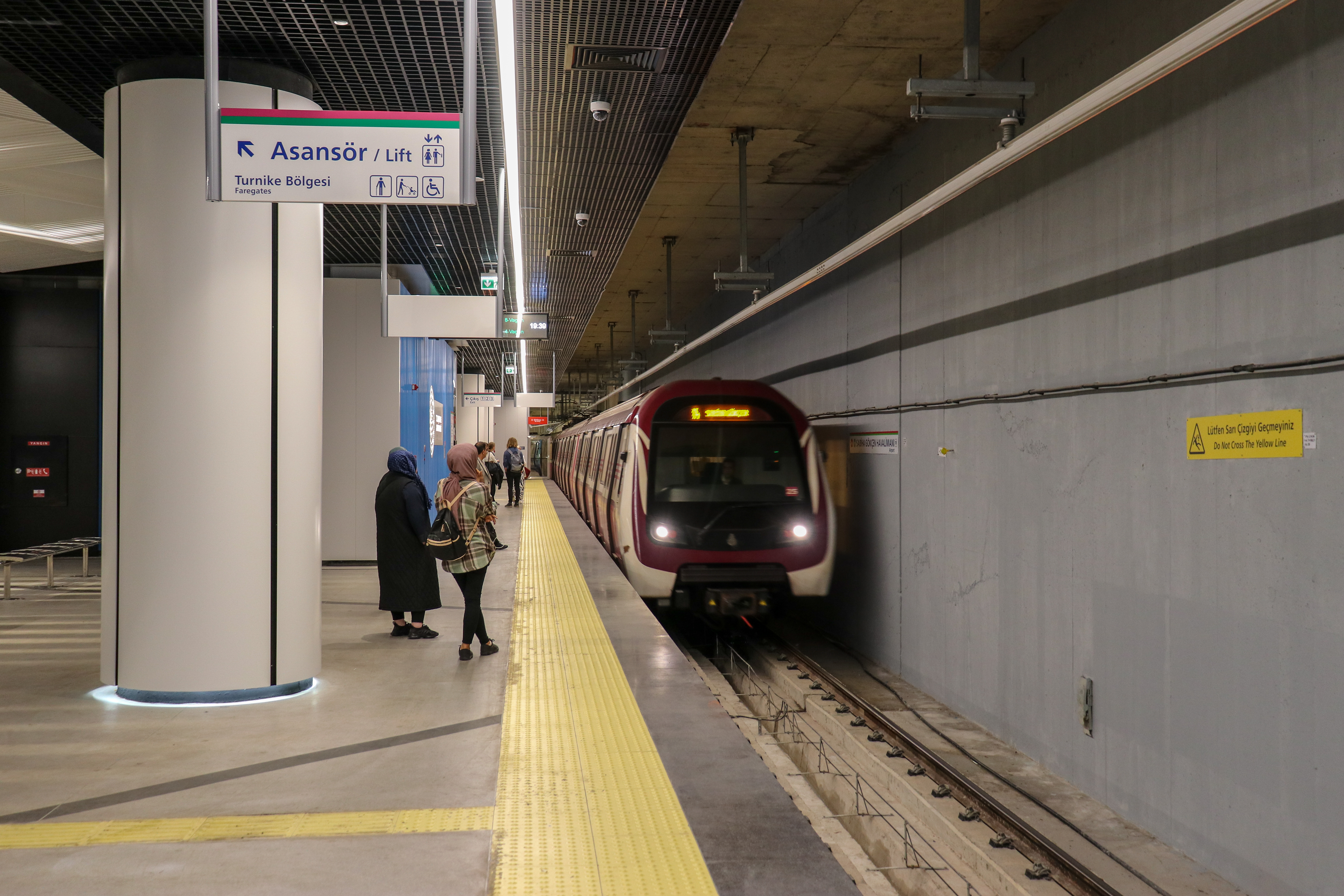
The M4 metro line has been extended to the airport.

Sabiha Gökçen International Airport is connected to the city of Istanbul and the city's wider metropolitan area through a number of transport options.

=== Rail ===
The airport is located 14 km from the Pendik railway station and sea-taxi stations.

=== Metro ===
The M4 metro line was extended to Sabiha Gökçen Havalimanı station on 2 October 2022.

Line M10, a metro connection to the Marmaray commuter rail and Yüksek Hızlı Tren high-speed trains via the Pendik station is currently under construction, with opening planned for 2026.

=== Road ===
The airport is reachable by car and taxi from the E80 European motorway which passes through the Istanbul Metropolitan Area. Shuttlebus companies such as Havaist, along with express public buses operated by the İETT, serve Taksim and Kadıköy, and there are coaches to nearby towns and cities.

== Accidents and incidents ==
- On 23 December 2015, at approximately 2:00 AM, explosions were reported to have occurred in a parked Pegasus Airlines aircraft, killing one cleaner and wounding another inside the plane. Five nearby planes were reported to be damaged as well. The operations were reported to continue normally soon after, however with heightened security measures in place. Three days later, it was reported that militant group Kurdistan Freedom Falcons had organized the attack.
- On 7 January 2020, a plane operated as Pegasus Airlines flight 747, a Boeing 737-800, suffered a runway excursion after landing. Passengers evacuated the aircraft using slides. No fatalities or injuries occurred.
- On 5 February 2020, a Boeing 737-800, registration TC-IZK, operated as Pegasus Airlines Flight 2193, skidded off the end of Runway 06, leading to an airport shutdown. There were 177 passengers and 6 crew on board. Three people were killed, another 179 were injured.

== See also ==
- List of the busiest airports in Turkey
- List of the busiest airports in Asia
- List of the busiest airports in the Middle East
- List of busiest airports by passenger traffic
