= Kars Harakani Airport =

Kars Harakani Airport Kars Harakani Havalimanı
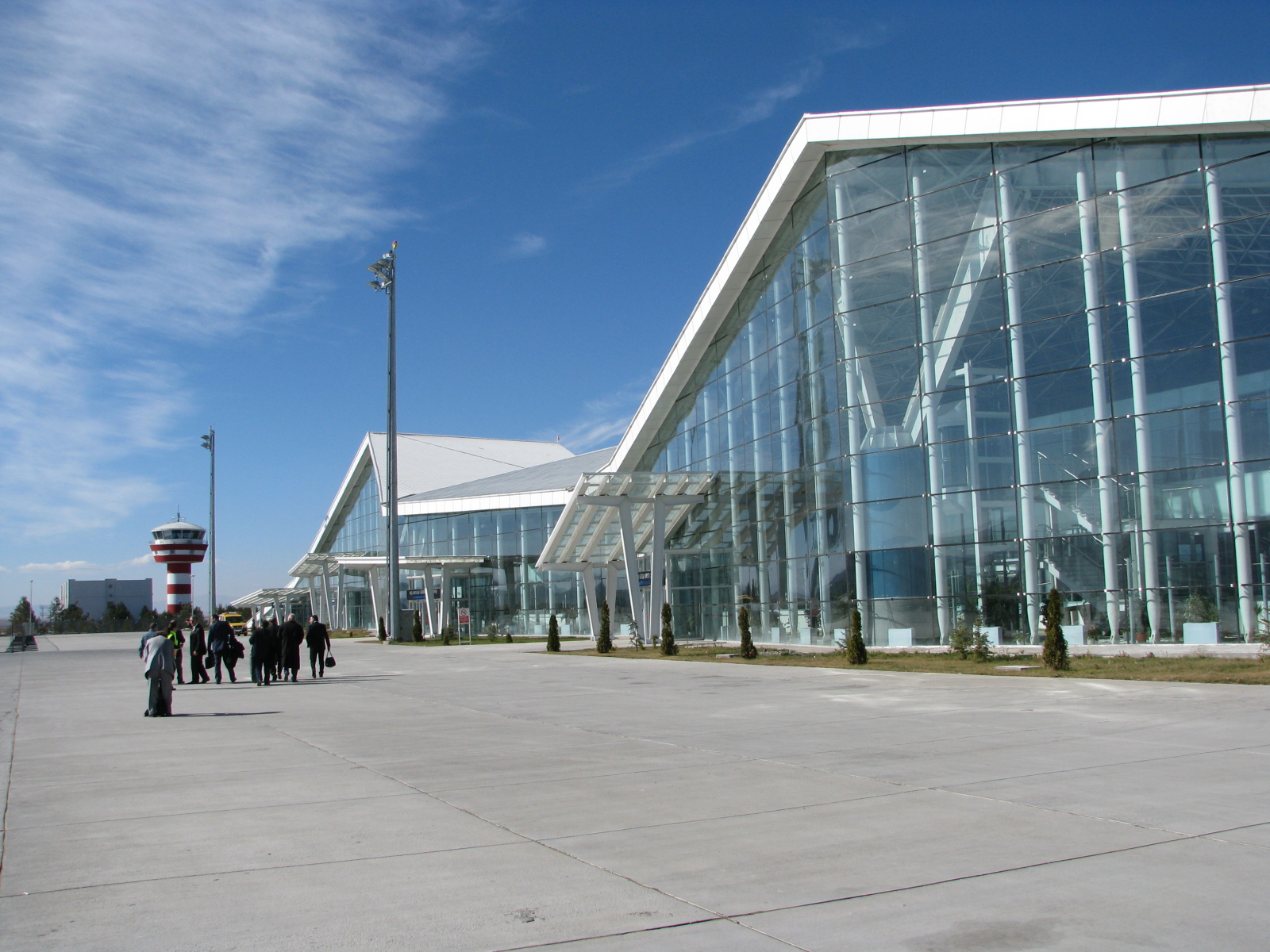
- IATA: KSY; ICAO: LTCF

Summary
- Airport type: Public
- Operator: General Directorate of State Airports Authority
- Serves: Kars, Turkey
- Location: Kars, Turkey
- Opened: 1988; 38 years ago
- Elevation AMSL: 5,889 ft (1,795 m)
- Coordinates: 40°33′44.00″N 43°6′54.01″E
- Website: www.dhmi.gov.tr

Map
- Location of airport in Turkey KSY (Europe)

Runways
Direction	Length		Surface
Direction	m	ft	Surface
06/24	3,500	11,483	Concrete

Statistics (2025)
- Annual passenger capacity: 3,500,000
- Passengers: 605,172
- Passenger change 2024–25: ▲4%
- Aircraft movements: 3,760
- Movements change 2024–25: ▲5%

Kars Harakani Airport is a public airport in Kars, Turkey (IATA: KSY, ICAO: LTCF). The airport, opened in 1988, is located 6 km (3.7 mi) from Kars. It has importance for serving also other cities like Ağrı, Ardahan, Artvin and Iğdır in north-eastern Turkey.

== History ==
In 2006, Kars Airport served 2,352 aircraft and 270,052 passengers. The passenger terminal open to the public covers an area of 1,695 m^{2} (18,240 sq ft) and has a parking lot for 100 cars. The airport was closed in the spring and summer months of 2007 for renovation works. The re-opening took place on 22 October 2007. The new terminal was designed by architect Yakup Hazan.

== Airlines and destinations ==
The following airlines operate regular scheduled and charter flights at Kars Harakani Airport:

Airlines	Destinations
AJet	Ankara, Istanbul–Sabiha Gökçen
Azerbaijan Airlines	Baku
Pegasus Airlines	Istanbul–Sabiha Gökçen
SunExpress	Izmir
Turkish Airlines	Istanbul

== Traffic Statistics ==
Kars–Harakani Airport Passenger Traffic Statistics
Year (months)	Domestic	% change	International	% change	Total	% change
2025	604,870	▲3%	302	-	605,172	▲4%
2024	584,512	▲7%	-	-	584,512	▲7%
2023	544,082	▲17%	-	-	544,082	▲17%
2022	465,121	▲3%	-	-	465,121	▲3%
2021	453,366	▲19%	-	▼100%	453,366	▲19%
2020	380,904	▼27%	219	▲13%	381,123	▼27%
2019	524,462	▼9%	194	-	524,656	▼9%
2018	577,562	▲0%	-	-	577,562	▲0%
2017	577,051	▲9%	-	-	577,051	▲9%
2016	528,637	▲23%	-	-	528,637	▲23%
2015	428,061	▲10%	-	▼100%	428,061	▲10%
2014	388,431	▼10%	482	-	388,913	▼10%
2013	430,175	▲14%	-	-	430,175	▲14%
2012	376,147	▼0%	-	-	376,147	▼0%
2011	377,584	▲14%	-	▼100%	377,584	▲14%
2010	329,811	▲15%	2,475	▲16%	332,286	▲15%
2009	285,880	▲7%	2,128	▲4%	288,008	▲7%
2008	267,038	▲180%	2,057	-	269,095	▲182%
2007	95,421	Steady	-	Steady	95,421	Steady
