= Kahramanmaraş Airport =

Airport in Kahramanmaraş, Turkey

Kahramanmaraş Airport Kahramanmaraş Havalimanı
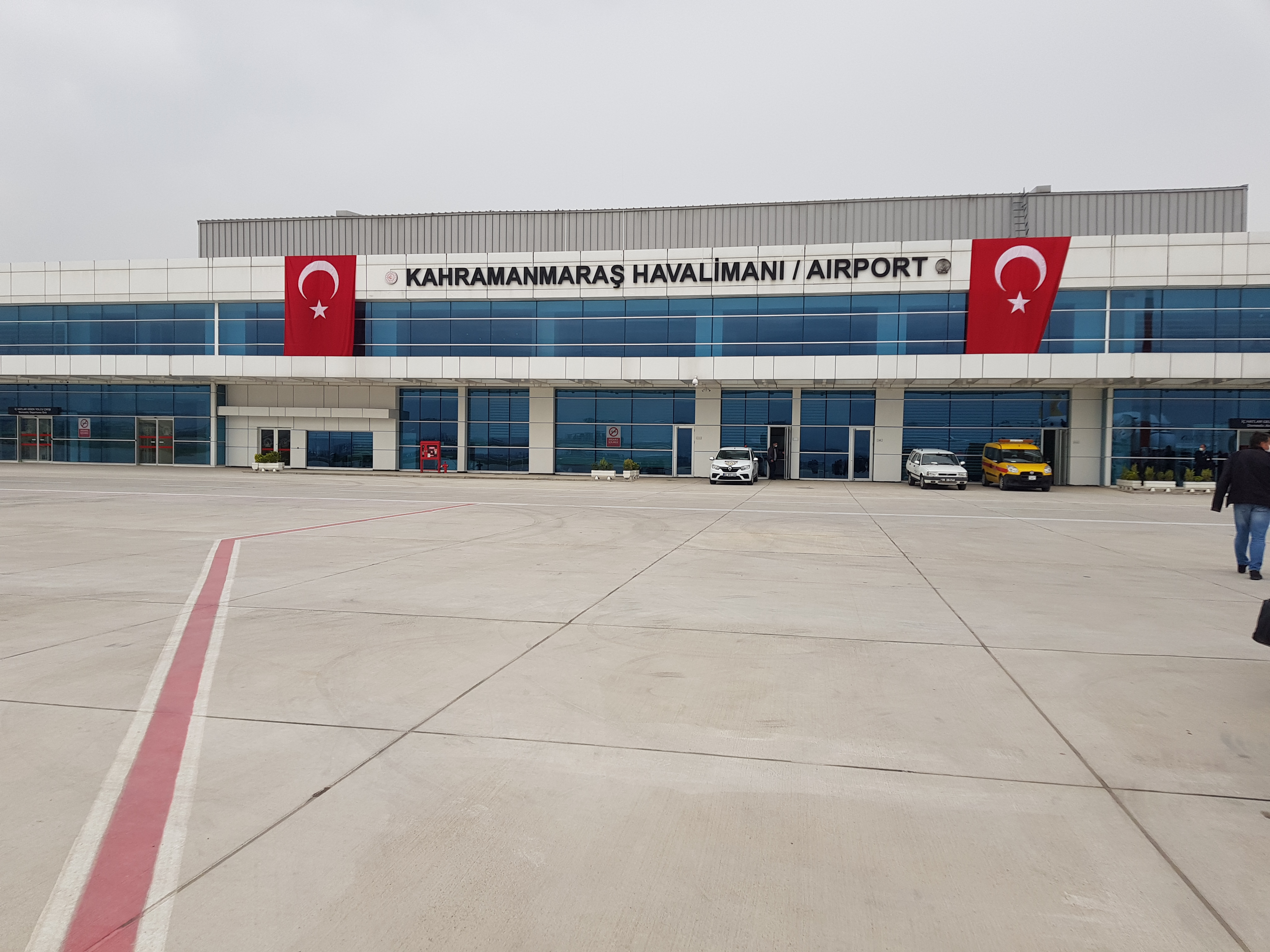
- IATA: KCM; ICAO: LTCN

Summary
- Airport type: Public
- Operator: General Directorate of State Airports Authority
- Serves: Kahramanmaraş
- Location: Dulkadiroğlu, Kahramanmaraş, Turkey
- Opened: 24 December 1996; 29 years ago
- Elevation AMSL: 1,723 ft (525 m)
- Coordinates: 37°32′20″N 036°57′12″E
- Website: www.dhmi.gov.tr

Map
- Location of airport in Turkey

Runways
Direction	Length		Surface
Direction	m	ft	Surface
08/26	2,300	7,546	Asphalt

Statistics (2025)
- Annual passenger capacity: 2,000,000
- Passengers: 328,603
- Passenger change 2024–25: ▲35%
- Aircraft movements: 3,909
- Movements change 2024–25: ▲60%

Kahramanmaraş Airport (Turkish: Kahramanmaraş Havaalanı) (IATA: KCM, ICAO: LTCN) is an airport in Kahramanmaraş, Turkey.

== Overview ==
The airport is operated since 1996 and used only for civil aviation. The actual capacity of the Terminal is 400,000 passengers/year. This airport doesn't have an instrumental landing System (ILS) but it has a satellite Controller starting and landing system (RNAP), which is very helpful in bad weather conditions and night flights. Due to rising passenger numbers, on 18 December 2016, the prime minister of Turkey gives the start for a brand new modern Terminal. The new modern Terminal-building includes a domestic and international area. The capacity will be 4 million passengers/year. The apron will take 5 planes at the same time. The new modern Terminal building will be opened in this summer. The airport is 5 km from the city center away. There is also public transportation (taxi, bus) available.

== Airlines and destinations ==
The following airlines operate regular scheduled and charter flights at Kahramanmaraş Airport:

Airlines	Destinations
AJet	Ankara
Pegasus Airlines	Istanbul–Sabiha Gökçen
Turkish Airlines	Istanbul

== Statistics ==
Kahramanmaraş Airport passenger traffic statistics
Year (months)	Domestic	% change	International	% change	Total	% change
2025	325,197	▲35%	3,406	▲60%	328,603	▲35%
2024	241,327	▼3%	2,126	▲385%	243,453	▼2%
2023	247,826	▲41%	438	▲508%	248,264	▲41%
2022	175,722	▲2%	72	-	175,794	▲2%
2021	171,785	▲22%	-	▼100%	171,785	▲21%
2020	140,897	▼47%	574	▲67%	141,471	▼47%
2019	266,136	▼20%	344	▼75%	266,480	▼20%
2018	332,614	▲12%	1,396	▼48%	334,010	▲12%
2017	296,263	▲12%	2,699	▲208%	298,962	▲13%
2016	263,706	▲15%	875	-	264,581	▲16%
2015	228,768	▲22%	-	-	228,768	▲22%
2014	187,268	▲33%	-	-	187,268	▲33%
2013	140,938	▲38%	-	-	140,938	▲38%
2012	102,046	▲7%	-	-	102,046	▲7%
2011	95,740	▲78%	-	-	95,740	▲78%
2010	53,698	▼34%	-	-	53,698	▼34%
2009	81,420	▲19%	-	-	81,420	▲19%
2008	68,167	▲45%	-	-	68,167	▲45%
2007	46,861	Steady	-	Steady	46,861	Steady
