= Malatya Erhaç Airport =

Malatya Airport Malatya Havalimanı
- IATA: MLX; ICAO: LTAT

Summary
- Airport type: Public / Military
- Owner: DHMİ
- Operator: DHMİ, Turkish Air Force
- Serves: Malatya
- Location: Akçadağ, Malatya
- Built: 1941
- Occupants: DHMİ and Turkish Air Force
- Coordinates: 38°26′07″N 38°05′27″E
- Website: dhmi.gov.tr

Map
- Location within Turkey Location within Europe Location within Asia

Runways
Direction	Length		Surface
Direction	m	ft	Surface
03/21	3,350	10,991	Asphalt

Statistics (2025)
- Annual passenger capacity: 2,500,000
- Passengers: 849,957
- Passenger change 2024–25: ▲6%
- Aircraft movements: 5,843
- Movements change 2024–25: ▲7%

Malatya Airport (Turkish: Malatya Havalimanı) (IATA: MLX, ICAO: LTAT) is a military and public airport in Malatya, Turkey. The airport, opened in 1941, is located 34 km (21 mi) from Malatya.

== History ==
A new terminal is expected to open in 2023.

During the 2023 Turkey–Syria earthquake, the ceiling of the airport experienced a partial collapse.

=== 2nd Land Aviation Regiment ===
Next to Erhaç Airport is the 2nd Land Aviation Regiment Command, headed by a Colonel. Turkish-made TAI/AgustaWestland T129 ATAK combat helicopters joined the Command in 2014.

== Airlines and destinations ==
The following airlines operate regular scheduled and charter flights at Malatya Erhaç Airport:

Airlines	Destinations
AJet	Ankara, Istanbul–Sabiha Gökçen
Pegasus Airlines	Istanbul–Sabiha Gökçen
SunExpress	Izmir; Seasonal: Antalya, Düsseldorf, Frankfurt
Turkish Airlines	Istanbul

== Traffic Statistics ==
Malatya Airport Passenger Traffic Statistics
Year (months)	Domestic	% change	International	% change	Total	% change
2025	837,346	▲5%	12,611	▼6%	849,957	▲6%
2024	794,698	▲9%	13,484	▲387%	808,182	▲11%
2023	727,624	▲12%	2,771	▼83%	730,395	▲10%
2022	649,764	▲2%	16,143	▲14%	665,907	▲2%
2021	636,637	▲34%	14,106	▲219%	650,743	▲36%
2020	473,665	▼35%	4,417	▼56%	478,082	▼36%
2019	733,026	▼15%	10,144	▼12%	743,170	▼15%
2018	860,036	▼2%	11,479	▲55%	871,515	▼2%
2017	878,991	▲12%	7,421	▲26%	886,412	▲12%
2016	783,181	▲3%	5,898	▼45%	789,079	▲3%
2015	756,728	▲19%	10,725	▲3%	767,453	▲18%
2014	637,590	▲1%	10,363	▼5%	647,953	▲1%
2013	628,892	▲10%	10,915	▼35%	639,807	▲9%
2012	572,599	▲4%	16,864	▼3%	589,463	▲4%
2011	553,142	▲10%	17,463	▲5%	570,605	▲10%
2010	503,774	▲15%	16,683	▼30%	520,457	▲12%
2009	439,057	▲0%	23,827	▼7%	462,884	▼0%
2008	438,226	▲8%	25,591	▲77%	463,817	▲10%
2007	407,026	Steady	14,418	Steady	421,444	Steady
