= Erzurum Airport =

Erzurum Airport Erzurum Havalimanı
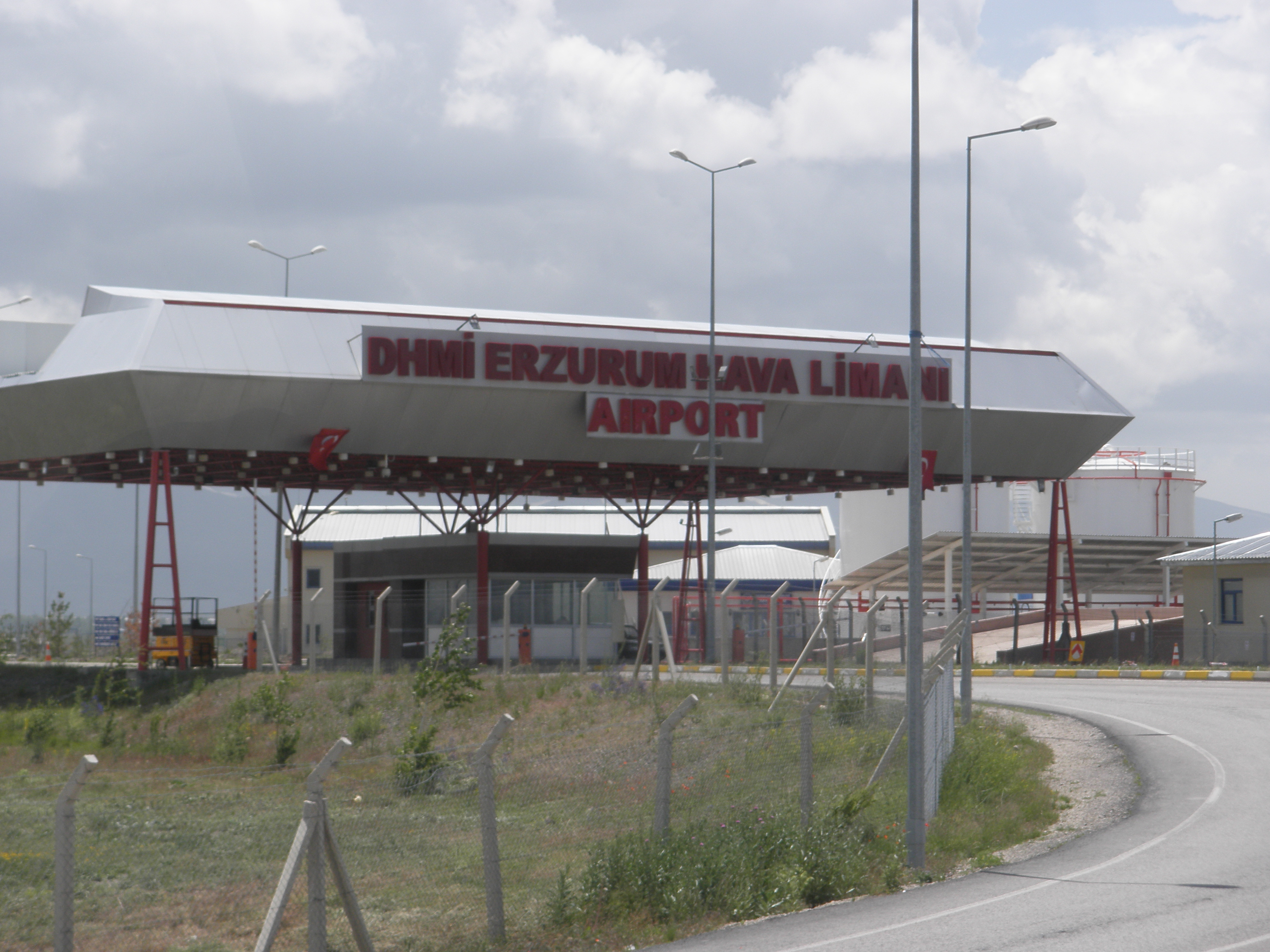
- IATA: ERZ; ICAO: LTCE

Summary
- Airport type: Public / Military
- Operator: DHMİ (State Airports Administrations) / Turkish Air Force Command
- Serves: Erzurum, Turkey
- Location: Aziziye, Erzurum, Turkey
- Opened: 1966; 60 years ago
- Coordinates: 39°57′19″N 41°10′09″E
- Website: www.dhmi.gov.tr

Map
- Location of airport in Turkey

Runways
Direction	Length		Surface
Direction	ft	m	Surface
08R/26L	12,500	3,810	Concrete
08L/26R	12,500	3,810	Concrete

Statistics (2025)
- Annual passenger capacity: 2,000,000
- Passengers: 1,268,112
- Passenger change 2024–25: ▲7%
- Aircraft movements: 8,546
- Movements change 2024–25: ▲9%

Erzurum Airport (IATA: ERZ, ICAO: LTCE) is a military and public airport serving the city of Erzurum in eastern Turkey. Inaugurated in 1966, it is located 11 km from the city. The airport's public passenger terminal covers an area of 5,750 m^{2} and has an open-air parking lot for 200 cars.

== Airlines and destinations ==
The following airlines operate regular scheduled and charter flights at Erzurum Airport:

Airlines	Destinations
AJet	Ankara, Bursa, Istanbul–Sabiha Gökçen
Pegasus Airlines	Istanbul–Sabiha Gökçen
SunExpress	Düsseldorf, Izmir; Seasonal: Antalya
Turkish Airlines	Istanbul

== Facilities ==
The domestic terminal has a restaurant on the second floor, as well as some smaller areas to buy food. There are two ATMs, Vakıfbank and Denizbank. Other services include a luggage covering machine, WiFi, a phone charging station, and rent a car stations.

== Traffic Statistics ==
Erzurum Airport Passenger Traffic Statistics
Year (months)	Domestic	% change	International	% change	Total	% change
2025	1,253,276	▲6%	14,836	▲114%	1,268,112	▲7%
2024	1,179,182	▲14%	6,945	▼34%	1,186,127	▲13%
2023	1,036,890	▲21%	10,504	▲19%	1,047,394	▲21%
2022	856,407	▲10%	8,808	▲192%	865,215	▲11%
2021	777,691	▲39%	3,019	▲20%	780,710	▲39%
2020	560,532	▼43%	2,516	▼62%	563,048	▼43%
2019	984,037	▼26%	6,650	▼33%	990,687	▼26%
2018	1,324,804	▼1%	9,992	▼2%	1,334,796	▼1%
2017	1,339,461	▲12%	10,172	▲50%	1,349,633	▲12%
2016	1,193,182	▲12%	6,771	▼44%	1,199,953	▲11%
2015	1,069,090	▲11%	12.019	▼16%	1,081,109	▲11%
2014	962,023	▲13%	14,313	▼39%	976,336	▲11%
2013	852,616	▲10%	23,505	▲42%	876,121	▲11%
2012	772,700	▼2%	16,520	▼4%	789,220	▼2%
2011	788,128	▲5%	17,209	▲14%	805,337	▲5%
2010	749,999	▲28%	15,083	▼1%	765,082	▲28%
2009	583,789	▲16%	15,228	▼40%	599,017	▲14%
2008	502,054	▼12%	25,544	▲9%	527,598	▼11%
2007	567,769	Steady	23,336	Steady	591,105	Steady

== Incidents ==
- On 15 September 2012, an Armenian cargo aircraft landed here while en route to Aleppo, Syria, so that Turkish authorities could check for arms. Coming less than a week after a jetliner of Syrian Arab Airlines was forced to land in Ankara due to suspicion of carrying arms, this stop was planned and agreed on beforehand.
- On 21 October 2015, an airliner did an emergency landing while en route from Vienna to Abu Dhabi to offload a Slovak economy class passenger who was handcuffed and arrested for using the closer business class lavatory after getting airsickness. The passenger was accommodated in a hotel overnight by the Turkish authorities and given a ticket to get back to her home country via Istanbul. The Slovak ambassador to Turkey sent a letter of thanks to the airport authorities for taking care of their citizen.
