= Kastamonu Airport =

Kastamonu Airport Kastamonu Havalimanı
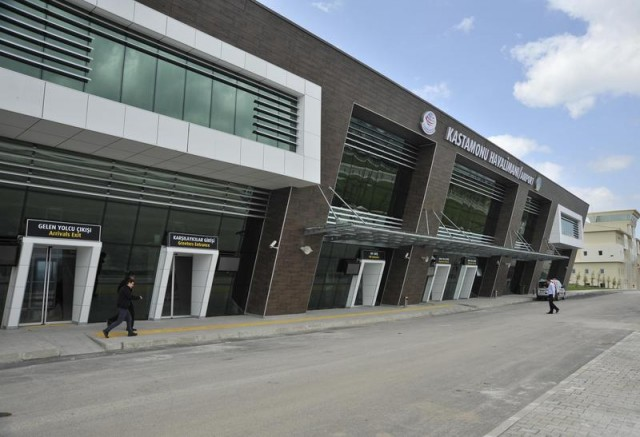
- IATA: KFS; ICAO: LTAL

Summary
- Airport type: Public
- Operator: General Directorate of State Airports Authority
- Serves: Kastamonu, Turkey
- Location: Kastamonu, Turkey
- Opened: 1990; 36 years ago (initial opening); 5 July 2013; 13 years ago (current facilities)
- Elevation AMSL: 3,520 ft / 1,073 m
- Coordinates: 41°19′01″N 33°47′46″E
- Website: www.dhmi.gov.tr

Map
- Location of the airport in Turkey KFS (Europe)

Runways
Direction	Length		Surface
Direction	m	ft	Surface
18/36	2,250	7,382	Asphalt

Statistics (2025)
- Annual passenger capacity: 1,500,000
- Passengers: 58,979
- Passenger change 2024–25: ▲1%
- Aircraft movements: 1,743
- Movements change 2024–25: ▲72%

Kastamonu Airport (IATA: KFS, ICAO: LTAL) is an airport located in the city of Kastamonu, Turkey. It was inaugurated on 5 July 2013 with the first Turkish Airlines flight incoming from Istanbul.

== Airlines and destinations ==
The following airlines operate regular scheduled and charter flights at Kastamonu Airport:

Airlines	Destinations
Turkish Airlines	Istanbul

== Traffic Statistics ==
Kastamonu Airport passenger traffic statistics
Year (months)	Domestic	% change	International	% change	Total	% change
2025	55,675	▼1%	3,304	▼3%	58,979	▼1%
2024	55,218	▼6%	3,405	▲50%	58,623	▼4%
2023	59,026	▲34%	2,269	▲669%	61,295	▲38%
2022	44,010	▲46%	295	▲409%	44,305	▲46%
2021	30,209	▲27%	58	▼96%	30,267	▲20%
2020	23,758	▼61%	1,377	▼39%	25,135	▼60%
2019	60,835	▼32%	2,260	▲5%	63,095	▼31%
2018	89,449	▼1%	2,143	▼6%	91,592	▼1%
2017	90,254	▼15%	2,276	▲257%	92,530	▼14%
2016	106,561	▲28%	638	-	107,199	▲29%
2015	82,960	▲23%	-	-	82,960	▲23%
2014	67,362	▲92%	-	-	67,362	▲92%
2013	35,126	Steady	-	Steady	35,126	Steady

^1: 2013 statistics correspond to the last 6 months of 2013 since the opening of the airport.
