= Erzincan Airport =

Erzincan Yıldırım Akbulut Airport Erzincan Yıldırım Akbulut Havalimanı
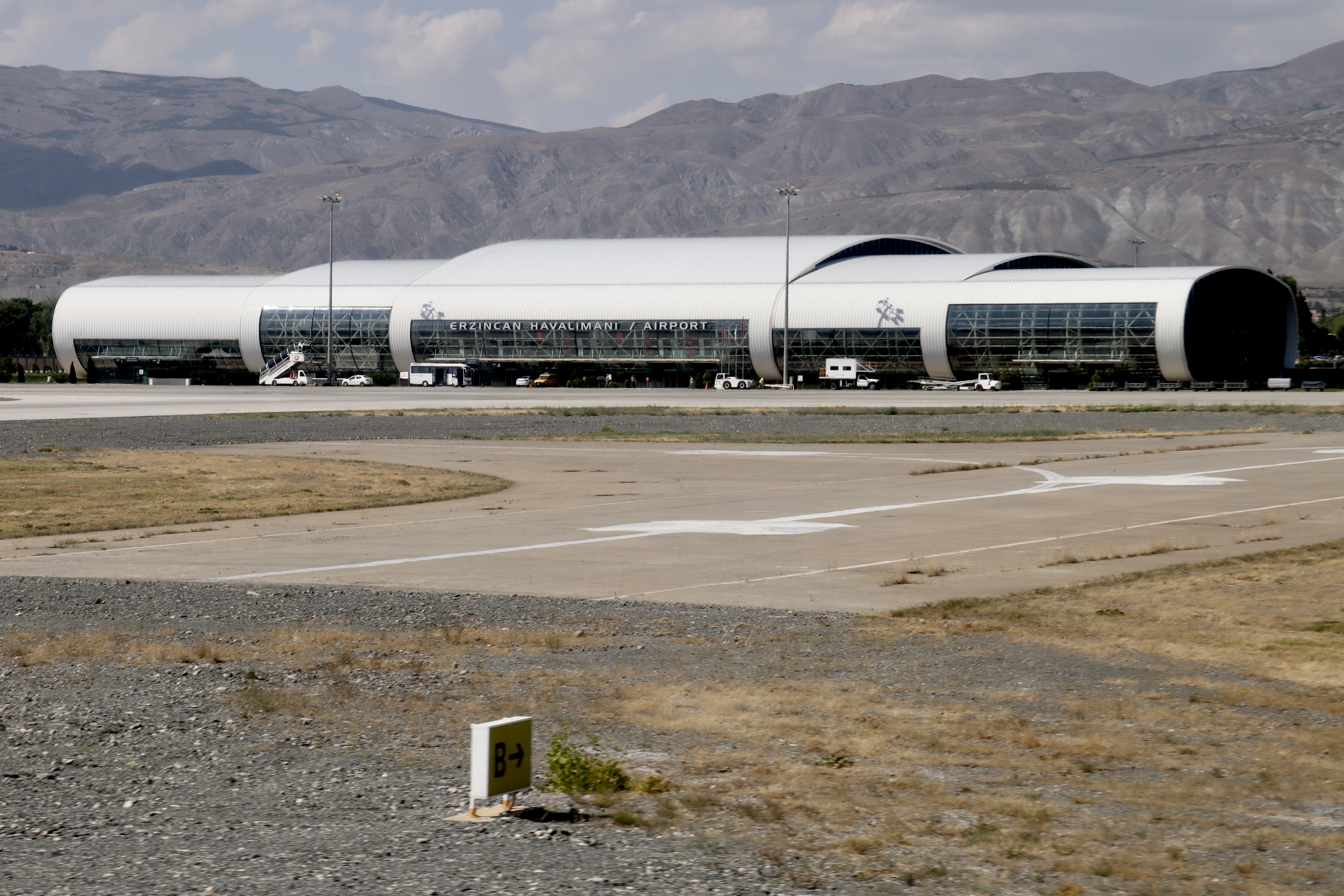
- IATA: ERC; ICAO: LTCD

Summary
- Airport type: Public / military
- Operator: General Directorate of State Airports Authority
- Serves: Erzincan, Turkey
- Location: Erzincan, Turkey
- Opened: 7 July 1988; 38 years ago
- Elevation AMSL: 3,783 ft / 1,153 m
- Coordinates: 39°42′36″N 039°31′37″E
- Website: www.dhmi.gov.tr

Map
- Location of airport in Turkey ERC (Europe)

Runways
Direction	Length		Surface
Direction	m	ft	Surface
11/29	3,000	9,842	Concrete

Statistics (2025)
- Annual passenger capacity: 3,000,000
- Passengers: 460,422
- Passenger change 2024–25: ▲7%
- Aircraft movements: 3,163
- Movements change 2024–25: ▲3%

Erzincan Yıldırım Akbulut Airport (IATA: ERC, ICAO: LTCD) is an airport located in Erzincan, Turkey.

== Airlines and destinations ==
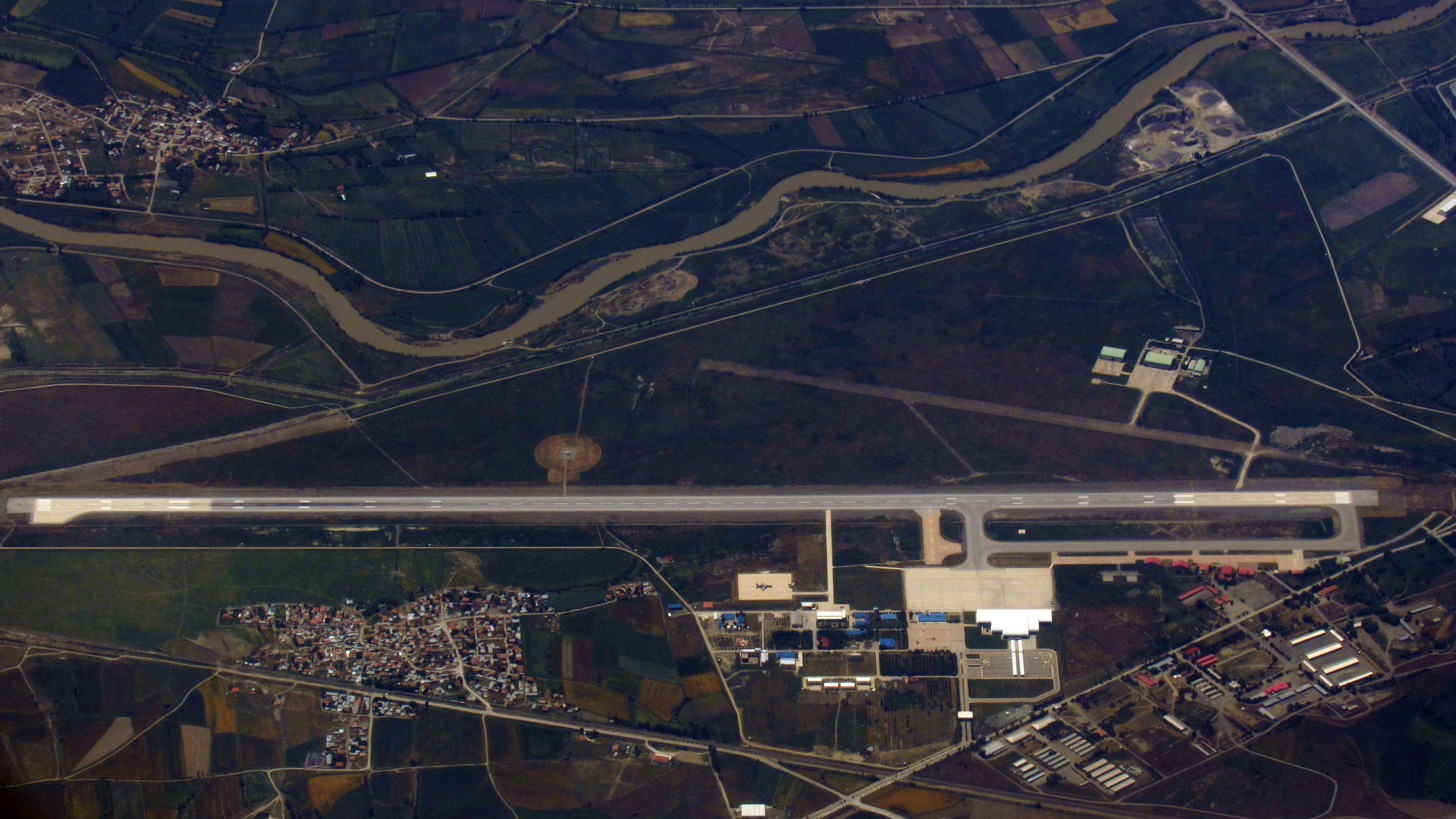
Aerial photo of the airport in 2016

The following airlines operate regular scheduled and charter flights at Erzincan Airport:

Airlines	Destinations
AJet	Ankara, Istanbul–Sabiha Gökçen
Pegasus Airlines	Istanbul–Sabiha Gökçen
Turkish Airlines	Istanbul

== Traffic statistics ==
Erzincan–Yıldırım Akbulut Airport passenger traffic statistics
Year (months)	Domestic	% change	International	% change	Total	% change
2025	457,731	▲7%	2,691	▲193%	460,422	▲7%
2024	439,100	▲8%	918	▲37%	430,018	▲8%
2023	395,819	▲39%	672	▼95%	396,491	▲33%
2022	285,171	▲4%	13,887	▼5%	299,058	▲3%
2021	275,188	▲25%	14,567	▲405%	289,755	▲30%
2020	220,785	▼47%	2,882	▲201%	223,667	▼47%
2019	417,497	▼17%	958	▲137%	418,455	▼16%
2018	500,222	▲14%	405	▼69%	500,627	▲13%
2017	440,322	▲27%	1,305	▲14%	441,627	▲27%
2016	345,800	▲17%	1,144	▲93%	346,944	▲17%
2015	295,246	▲0%	594	▼52%	295,840	▲0%
2014	294,055	▲4%	1,237	-	295,292	▲5%
2013	281,502	▲21%	-	-	281,502	▲21%
2012	233,580	▲13%	-	-	233,580	▲13%
2011	207,074	▲58%	-	-	207,074	▲58%
2010	130,892	▲3%	-	-	130,892	▲3%
2009	127,030	▲39%	-	-	127,030	▲39%
2008	91,540	▲42%	-	-	91,540	▲42%
2007	64,681	Steady	-	Steady	64,681	Steady
