= Gaziantep Oğuzeli Airport =

Gaziantep Oğuzeli Airport Gaziantep Oğuzeli Havalimanı
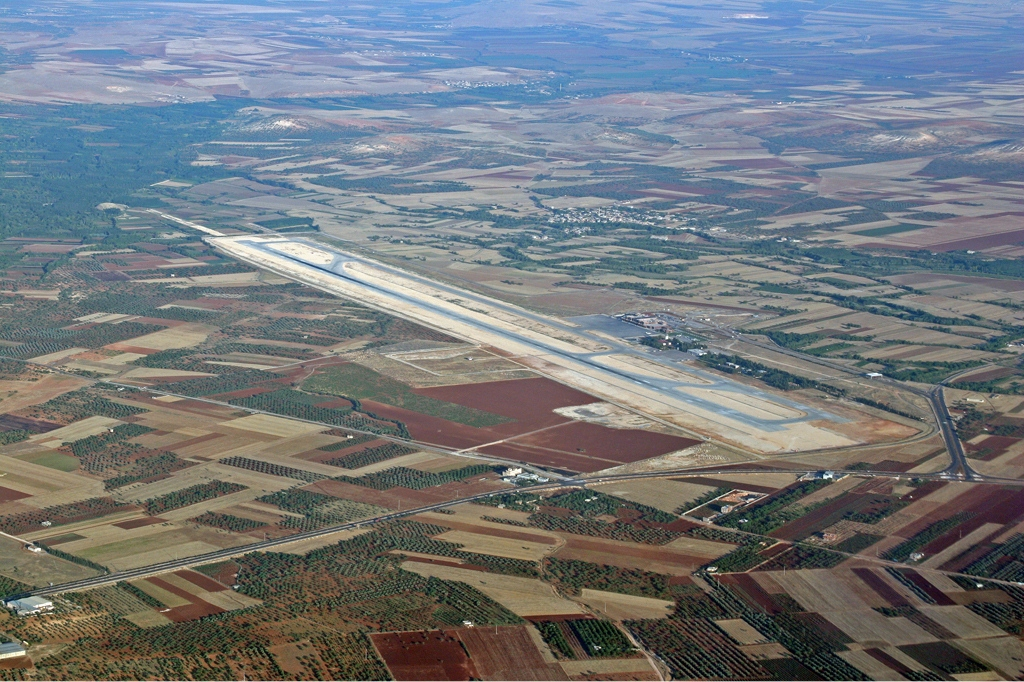
- IATA: GZT; ICAO: LTAJ

Summary
- Airport type: Public
- Operator: General Directorate of State Airports (DHMİ)
- Serves: Gaziantep, Turkey
- Location: Oğuzeli, Gaziantep, Turkey
- Opened: 11 September 1976; 50 years ago
- Coordinates: 36°56′52″N 37°28′44″E
- Website: www.dhmi.gov.tr

Map
- Location of airport in Turkey GZT (Europe)

Runways
Direction	Length		Surface
Direction	ft	m	Surface
10R/28L	9,842	3,000	Asphalt/Concrete

Statistics (2025)
- Annual passenger capacity: 6,000,000
- Passengers: 3,068,220
- Passenger change 2024–25: ▲4%
- Aircraft movements: 28,539
- Movements change 2024–25: ▲12%

Gaziantep Oğuzeli International Airport (IATA: GZT, ICAO: LTAJ) (Turkish: Gaziantep Oğuzeli Uluslararası Havalimanı) is a public airport in Gaziantep, Turkey. Inaugurated in 1976, it is 20 km from the city. Gaziantep Airport was extended with construction starting in 1998, and achieved international airport status in 2006. The passenger terminal covers an area of 5.799 m^{2} and has a parking lot for 400 cars.

Following the 2023 Turkey–Syria earthquakes, Gaziantep became a major hub for humanitarian aid.

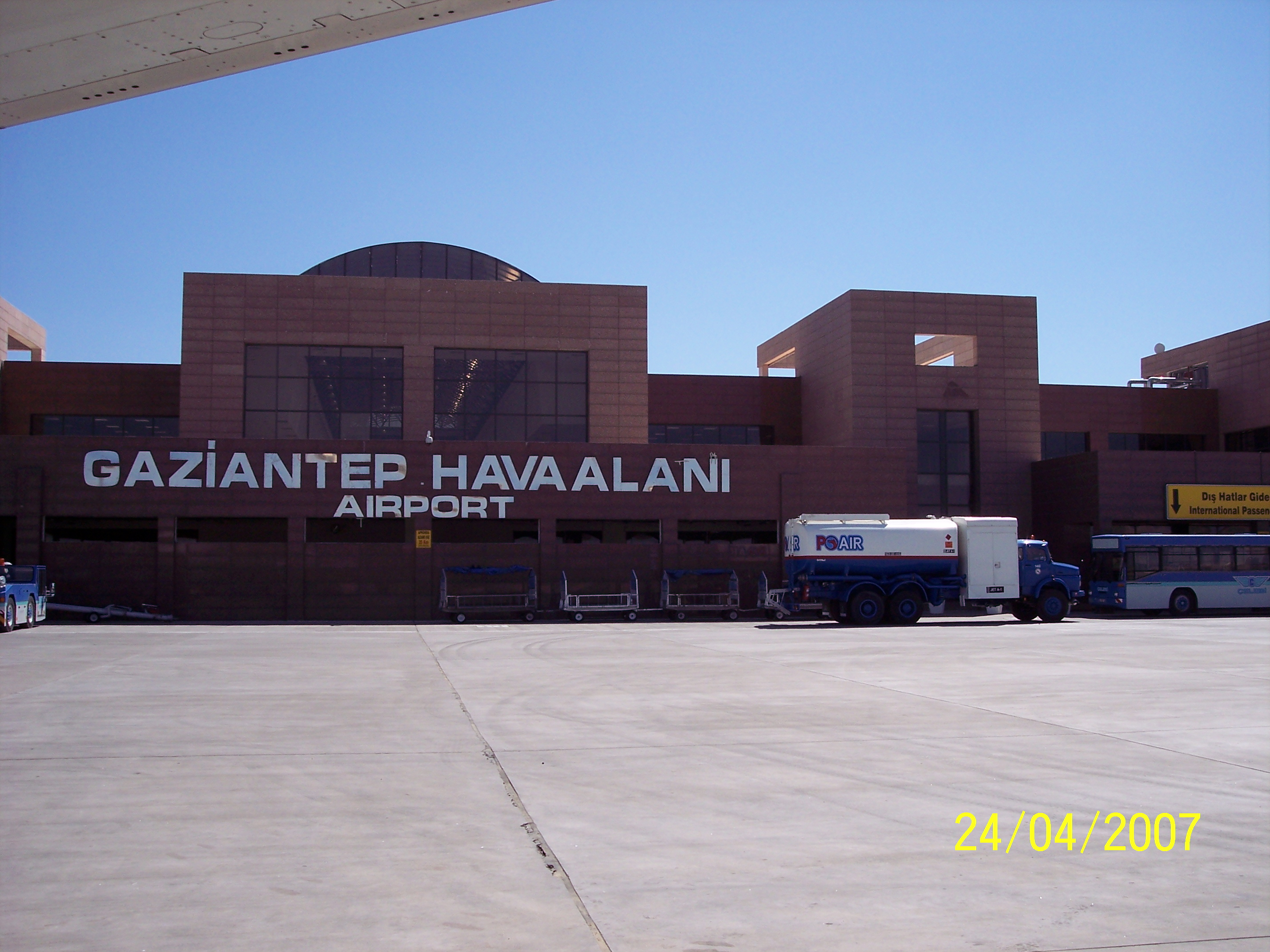
Old terminal

== Airlines and destinations ==
The following airlines operate regular scheduled and charter flights at Oğuzeli Airport:

Airlines	Destinations
AJet	Ankara, Erbil, Ercan, Istanbul–Sabiha Gökçen; Seasonal: Berlin
Corendon Airlines	Seasonal: Hannover
Iraqi Airways	Baghdad
Pegasus Airlines	Cologne/Bonn, Düsseldorf, Erbil, Ercan, Istanbul–Sabiha Gökçen, İzmir; Seasonal: Berlin
SunExpress	Antalya, Berlin, Düsseldorf, Frankfurt, London–Stansted, Izmir, Munich, Stuttgart, Zurich; Seasonal: Basel/Mulhouse, Hannover
Turkish Airlines	Istanbul

== Traffic Statistics ==
Gaziantep–Oğuzeli Airport passenger traffic statistics
Year (months)	Domestic	% change	International	% change	Total	% change
2025	2,602,315	▲1%	465,905	▲23%	3,068,220	▲4%
2024	2,577,317	▲13%	377,914	▲10%	2,955,231	▲12%
2023	2,282,944	▲13%	344,249	▲12%	2,627,193	▲13%
2022	2,019,436	▲19%	306,372	▲86%	2,325,808	▲25%
2021	1,694,871	▲33%	164,653	▲38%	1,859,524	▲34%
2020	1,271,409	▼41%	119,375	▼68%	1,390,784	▼45%
2019	2,152,284	▼8%	372,092	▲26%	2,524,376	▼4%
2018	2,340,849	▼2%	296,178	▲17%	2,637,027	▲0%
2017	2,376,737	▲13%	252,832	▲10%	2,629,569	▲13%
2016	2,099,976	▼2%	230,514	▲18%	2,330,490	▼0%
2015	2,136,123	▲13%	195,104	▲1%	2,331,227	▲12%
2014	1,889,937	▲14%	192,884	▲16%	2,082,821	▲14%
2013	1,662,457	▲31%	166,342	▼5%	1,828,799	▲27%
2012	1,268,715	▲8%	174,254	▲21%	1,442,969	▲10%
2011	1,170,025	▲24%	144,483	▲52%	1,314,508	▲26%
2010	944,661	▲33%	95,311	▼23%	1,039,972	▲25%
2009	708,673	▲9%	124,329	▲18%	833,002	▲10%
2008	649,344	▲1%	105,624	▲15%	754,968	▲3%
2007	642,232	Steady	92,195	Steady	734,427	Steady
