= General Directorate of State Airports Authority =

Turkish government agency

- Devlet Hava Meydanları İşletmesi Genel Müdürlüğü
- Abbreviation: DHMİ
- Formation: May 20, 1933; 93 years ago
- Type: Governmental
- Headquarters: Ankara, Turkey
- Official language: Turkish
- Director General: Enes Çakmak
- Parent organization: Turkish Ministry of Transport and Infrastructure
- Website: www.dhmi.gov.tr

Turkish Airports Authority or legally General Directorate of State Airports Authority (Turkish: Devlet Hava Meydanları İşletmesi Genel Müdürlüğü; DHMİ), is the Turkish government authority responsible for the functioning of airports in Turkey and the regulation and monitoring of air traffic control in Turkish airspace. It is associated with the Turkish Ministry of Transport and Infrastructure and is a member of ICAO, EUROCONTROL, and ACI Europe.

The authority operates most airports in Turkey, with the notable exceptions being Istanbul Airport, Antalya Airport, İzmir Adnan Menderes Airport, Milas–Bodrum Airport and Çukurova Airport.

== See also ==
- TAV Airports Holding, a major airport

operator in Turkey

- Directorate General of Civil Aviation (Turkey)
