= List of the busiest airports in Turkey =

The tables below contain General Directorate of State Airports (DHMI) data from 2007 to 2025, on the busiest airports in Turkey by total passenger traffic, including information on international, domestic and transit passengers.

Istanbul serves as one of the largest aviation hubs in the world, with two international airports, handling 132,921,255 passengers in 2025. Istanbul Airport, which handled about 84 million passengers in 2025, is the largest and second-busiest international airport in Europe. Istanbul's second-busiest airport, Sabiha Gökçen Airport, which handled over 48 million passengers in 2025, is one of the fastest-growing airports in Europe.

== Busiest Turkish airports by passenger traffic ==
The busiest airports in Turkey ordered by total passenger traffic, according to the DHMI reports.

Airport	City served	Region	IATA/ ICAO	2025	2024	2023	2022	2021	2020	2019	2018	2017	2016	2015	2014	2013	2012	2011	2010	2009	2008	2007
Adana Şakirpaşa Airport	Adana	Mediterranean region	ADA/LTAF	N/A	3,085,048	4,728,808	3,874,593	3,399,491	2,547,344	5,057,788	5,630,674	5,610,176	5,585,702	5,309,706	4,687,494	4,315,778	3,764,157	3,240,967	2,841,170	2,482,402	2,290,427	2,302,535
Adıyaman Airport	Adıyaman	Southeastern Anatolia region	ADF/LTCP	388,260	366,377	368,398	182,423	132,535	123,800	244,576	281,036	259,780	244,756	191,630	159,268	118,124	100,522	45,346	108,507	85,112	86,280	48,621
Ağrı Airport	Ağrı	Eastern Anatolia region	AJI/LTCO	396,411	312,305	317,537	222,170	250,600	208,987	321,758	326,720	283,620	235,770	211,723	201,140	181,921	154,035	134,519	N/A	14,169	60,360	42,621
Amasya Merzifon Airport	Amasya	Black Sea region	MZH/LTAP	154,954	137,850	130,204	93,233	111,445	90,013	167,758	180,471	221,996	91,729	146,208	137,753	113,458	82,750	48,035	64,393	39,577	13,888	N/A
Esenboğa International Airport	Ankara	Central Anatolia region	ESB/LTAC	13,926,680	12,913,753	11,950,940	8,679,594	7,029,630	5,162,569	13,740,595	16,740,003	15,817,158	13,044,116	12,113,439	11,035,606	10,942,060	9,273,108	8,485,467	7,763,914	6,084,404	5,692,133	4,958,128
Antalya Airport	Antalya	Mediterranean region	AYT/LTAI	39,000,177	38,133,273	35,664,138	31,108,181	22,013,861	9,711,195	35,679,421	31,703,864	25,872,451	18,768,535	27,769,404	28,303,192	27,018,623	25,096,144	25,027,657	22,013,027	18,345,693	18,789,257	17,710,385
Alanya Gazipaşa Airport	Antalya	Mediterranean region	GZP/LTFG	992,383	1,027,654	835,709	682,654	579,635	270,868	1,084,901	1,201,895	821,178	718,718	914,017	724,842	338,522	79,740	14,130	4,684	N/A	N/A	N/A
Balıkesir Koca Seyit Airport	Balıkesir	Marmara region	EDO/LTFD	286,257	264,204	260,533	221,393	265,555	159,026	354,381	514,010	436,261	364,748	321,520	206,388	91,578	46,595	59,656	37,236	N/A	17,399	21,806
Balıkesir Airport	Balıkesir	Marmara region	BZI/LTBF	N/A	N/A	N/A	N/A	N/A	N/A	N/A	N/A	N/A	N/A	286	534	2,876	11,573	6,674	N/A	256	N/A	1,313
Bingöl Airport	Bingöl	Eastern Anatolia region	BGG/LTCU	190,268	180,651	170,519	133,879	152,967	121,382	203,313	225,477	168,220	156,915	135,864	123,782	29,443	N/A	N/A	N/A	N/A	N/A	N/A
Bursa Yenişehir Airport	Bursa	Marmara region	YEI/LTBR	246,543	200,687	194,910	112,464	77,114	60,571	268,991	242,571	251,147	274,891	187,517	74,108	66,929	79,756	111,550	97,534	73,496	75,462	51,724
Çanakkale Airport	Çanakkale	Marmara region	CKZ/LTBH	192,434	187,631	172,322	152,607	79,145	96,564	131,240	229,407	218,055	183,958	168,117	43,805	7,737	49,240	60,543	24,178	19,207	21,259	41,079
Çanakkale Gökçeada Airport	Çanakkale	Marmara region	GKD/LTFK	N/A	N/A	N/A	N/A	N/A	N/A	N/A	N/A	N/A	N/A	N/A	N/A	1,726	1,666	1,106	N/A	N/A	N/A	N/A
Denizli Çardak Airport	Denizli	Aegean region	DNZ/LTAY	459,061	453,162	434,859	391,112	315,714	233,197	649,782	656,610	680,999	550,955	514,459	404,340	281,643	192,108	174,627	135,005	150,780	157,361	151,212
Diyarbakır Airport	Diyarbakır	Southeastern Anatolia region	DIY/LTCC	2,292,693	2,148,881	2,040,747	1,672,377	1,349,124	1,115,642	1,782,236	2,069,306	2,053,202	1,978,017	2,100,201	1,812,208	1,798.653	1,285,824	1,733,374	1,404,590	1,060,381	967,088	895,625
Elazığ Airport	Elazığ	Eastern Anatolia region	EZS/LTCA	1,104,710	972,295	920,689	682,024	559,236	541,827	902,502	1,039,178	1,030,512	1,024,055	958,169	895,202	837,355	681,417	549,054	470,049	344,844	135,293	119,877
Erzincan Airport	Erzincan	Eastern Anatolia region	ERC/LTCD	460,422	430,018	396,491	299,058	289,755	223,667	418,455	500,627	441,627	346,944	295,840	295,292	281,502	233,580	207,074	130,892	127,030	91,540	64,681
Erzurum Airport	Erzurum	Eastern Anatolia region	ERZ/LTCE	1,268,112	1,186,127	1,047,394	865,215	780,710	563,048	990,687	1,334,796	1,349,633	1,199,953	1,081,109	976,336	876,121	789,220	805,337	765,082	599,017	527,598	591,105
Eskişehir Anadolu Airport	Eskişehir	Central Anatolia region	AOE/LTBY	110,564	111,535	93,162	109,010	99,615	51,158	89,022	99,331	80,048	56,454	51,925	45,872	34,400	47,228	43,038	63,610	78,323	45,477	15,504
Gaziantep Oğuzeli Airport	Gaziantep	Southeastern Anatolia region	GZT/LTAJ	3,068,220	2,955,231	2,627,193	2,325,808	1,859,524	1,390,784	2,524,376	2,637,027	2,629,569	2,330,490	2,331,227	2,082,821	1,828,799	1,442,969	1,314,508	1,039,972	833,002	754,968	734,427
Hakkari Yüksekova Airport	Hakkari	Eastern Anatolia region	YKO/LTCW	172,307	156,889	159,276	115,623	127,991	96,025	180,506	190,666	153,700	37,720	20,876	N/A	N/A	N/A	N/A	N/A	N/A	N/A	N/A
Hatay Airport	Hatay	Mediterranean region	HTY/LTDA	506,499	288,706	183,908	1,058,214	898,377	635,458	1,213,870	1,325,009	1,284,557	1,203,430	1,171,751	1,113,929	964,707	663,892	689,586	574,613	325,307	162,128	2,965
Isparta Süleyman Demirel Airport	Isparta	Mediterranean region	ISE/LTFC	68,639	75,734	82,548	72,410	49,068	42,247	149,637	172,981	188,209	204,207	241,367	184,929	147,660	50,062	21,559	33,411	16,461	15,053	47,564
Çukurova International Airport	Mersin	Mediterranean region	COV/LTDB	5,434,070	1,928,644	N/A	N/A	N/A	N/A	N/A	N/A	N/A	N/A	N/A	N/A	N/A	N/A	N/A	N/A	N/A	N/A	N/A
Atatürk Airport	Istanbul	Marmara region	ISL/LTBA	N/A	N/A	N/A	N/A	454	N/A	16,112,804	68,346,784	64,106,014	60,415,470	61,332,124	56,695,166	51,297,790	45,091,962	37,394,694	32,143,819	29,812,888	28,553,132	23,196,229
Istanbul Airport	Istanbul	Marmara region	IST/LTFM	84,513,937	80,430,740	76,011,907	64,518,073	37,181,907	23,410,380	52,009,220	95,205	N/A	N/A	N/A	N/A	N/A	N/A	N/A	N/A	N/A	N/A	N/A
Sabiha Gökçen International Airport	Istanbul	Marmara region	SAW/LTFJ	48,407,318	41,449,044	36,825,424	30,737,854	24,900,907	16,951,190	35,560,610	34,133,617	31,386,038	29,667,853	28,108,738	23,494,646	18,521,762	14,686,052	13,124,670	11,189,678	6,517,486	4,281,193	3,720,495
Adnan Menderes Airport	İzmir	Aegean region	ADB/LTBJ	12,665,660	11,507,296	10,556,199	9,834,578	7,569,054	5,464,858	12,365,256	13,410,378	12,824,310	12,051,243	12,178,100	10,970,663	10,233,140	9,355,902	8,523,533	7,485,098	6,201,794	5,455,298	5,236,304
Kars Airport	Kars	Eastern Anatolia region	KSY/LTCF	605,172	584,512	544,082	465,121	453,366	381,123	524,656	577,562	577,051	528,637	428,061	388,913	430,175	376,147	377,584	332,286	288,008	269,095	95,421
Kastamonu Airport	Kastamonu	Black Sea region	KFS/LTAL	58,979	58,623	61,295	44,305	30,267	25,135	63,095	91,592	92,530	107,199	82,960	67,362	35,126	N/A	N/A	N/A	N/A	N/A	N/A
Kayseri Erkilet Airport	Kayseri	Central Anatolia region	ASR/LTAU	2,765,751	2,603,444	2,351,652	2,284,604	1,682,209	1,161,159	2,325,863	2,183,847	2,147,320	1,984,525	1,972,148	1,745,846	1,633,012	1,329,826	1,223,760	940,245	778,639	674,833	765,306
Kocaeli Cengiz Topel Airport	Kocaeli	Marmara region	KCO/LTBQ	3,746	5,306	2,967	1,767	9,173	11,851	57,280	54,110	49,242	59,049	41,728	11,841	13,200	62,311	11,851	N/A	N/A	N/A	N/A
Konya Airport	Konya	Central Anatolia region	KYA/LTAN	970,227	924,393	903,361	801,033	662,397	495,861	1,008,803	1,160,885	1,247,705	1,093,330	1,069,643	989,398	835,951	659,209	600,871	545,497	301,724	266,143	248,070
Zafer Airport	Kütahya	Aegean region	KZR/LTBZ	78,819	66,735	85,762	57,097	22,929	16,645	82,026	99,395	103,364	86,733	93,874	86,557	84,774	3,181	N/A	N/A	N/A	N/A	N/A
Malatya Erhaç Airport	Malatya	Eastern Anatolia region	MLX/LTAT	849,957	808,182	730,395	665,907	650,743	478,082	743,170	871,515	886,412	789,079	767,453	647,953	639,807	589,463	570,605	520,457	462,884	463,817	421,444
Kahramanmaraş Airport	Kahramanmaraş	Mediterranean region	KCM/LTCN	328,603	243,453	248,264	175,794	171,785	141,471	266,480	334,010	298,962	264,581	228,768	187,268	140,938	102,046	95,740	53,698	81,420	68,167	46,861
Mardin Airport	Mardin	Southeastern Anatolia region	MQM/LTCR	845,465	772,497	728,812	599,722	580,889	397,564	568,244	712,775	680,858	640,380	568,710	469,935	359,809	278,590	122,912	305,914	233,288	192,764	191,383
Dalaman Airport	Muğla	Aegean region	DLM/LTBS	5,577,142	5,637,067	5,235,558	4,535,600	2,323,874	1,587,125	4,905,019	4,559,246	3,718,768	3,101,902	4,377,101	4,276,674	4,055,630	3,810,015	3,732,941	3,784,440	3,347,996	3,208,668	2,895,967
Milas–Bodrum Airport	Muğla	Aegean region	BJV/LTFE	4,357,902	4,323,737	4,053,354	3,898,527	2,909,337	1,480,339	4,337,733	4,172,112	3,501,530	3,221,776	3,877,873	3,846,547	3,628,320	3,530,460	3,388,335	3,085,187	2,780,944	2,749,788	2,578,100
Muş Airport	Muş	Eastern Anatolia region	MSR/LTCK	637,803	505,016	480,515	347,466	367,390	277,960	385,586	459,863	438,037	374,154	341,866	314,869	268,154	207,248	196,546	179,808	115,795	88,875	23,905
Nevşehir Kapadokya Airport	Nevşehir	Central Anatolia region	NAV/LTAZ	754,489	721,942	564,320	434,154	262,440	134,135	494,085	380,710	127,869	367,740	362,655	297,532	196,828	173,978	157,792	137,909	122,753	100,762	54,054
Ordu-Giresun Airport	Ordu	Black Sea region	OGU/LTCB	1,163,300	951,842	1,001,529	813,370	740,653	556,432	1,060,265	1,094,550	1,187,786	796,188	222,936	N/A	N/A	N/A	N/A	N/A	N/A	N/A	N/A
Rize-Artvin Airport	Rize	Black Sea region	RZV/LTFO	1,161,135	1,097,828	1,023,921	526,880	N/A	N/A	N/A	N/A	N/A	N/A	N/A	N/A	N/A	N/A	N/A	N/A	N/A	N/A	N/A
Samsun-Çarşamba Airport	Samsun	Black Sea region	SZF/LTFH	1,640,095	1,514,254	1,400,129	1,204,370	1,126,078	868,141	1,489,333	1,735,522	1,175,525	1,783,839	1,713,247	1,522,058	1,332,148	1,237,691	1,155,158	957,391	866,862	604,387	555,796
Siirt Airport	Siirt	Southeastern Anatolia region	SXZ/LTCL	65,517	72,606	62,711	50,918	45,840	33,568	34,718	N/A	22,674	97,912	66,753	19,526	16,896	33,740	31,420	937	N/A	12,581	14,278
Sinop Airport	Sinop	Black Sea region	NOP/LTCM	116,483	92,084	95,011	70,246	74,463	78,028	137,181	179,183	153,070	91,215	92,411	81,497	N/A	67,404	58,438	57,454	47,147	14,464	N/A
Sivas Airport	Sivas	Central Anatolia region	VAS/LTAR	502,630	424,600	427,608	367,037	410,437	300,881	491,308	581,367	567,689	562,159	530,941	422,556	338,730	244,010	228,599	111,457	124,137	124,357	101,959
Tekirdağ Çorlu Airport	Tekirdağ	Marmara region	TEQ/LTBU	29,774	30,203	33,708	44,205	7,776	22,781	72,953	106,207	104,879	97.869	150,340	122,568	77,865	26,257	43,120	74,404	40,778	6,882	29,768
Tokat Airport	Tokat	Black Sea region	TJK/LTAW	174,619	155,733	149,802	88,445	N/A	N/A	N/A	N/A	13,058	51,744	56,165	35,067	17,796	25,425	30,516	13,723	N/A	21,828	44,483
Trabzon Airport	Trabzon	Black Sea region	TZX/LTCG	3,874,640	3,655,579	3,535,902	3,185,229	2,642,327	1,801,600	3,770,818	4,028,563	4,148,929	3,713,994	3,362,799	2,777,536	2,620,887	2,404,150	2,280,017	1,963,169	1,596,905	1,469,713	1,482,760
Şanlıurfa GAP Airport	Şanlıurfa	Southeastern Anatolia region	GNY/LTCS	1,059,953	924,157	814,478	641,580	555,187	407,531	729,947	856,765	840,769	778,004	697,827	592,944	545,627	347,326	231,323	221,034	181,155	154,657	114,681
Uşak Airport	Uşak	Aegean region	USQ/LTBO	N/A	N/A	56	N/A	52	7,500	27,983	21,897	N/A	12,633	11,017	8,405	N/A	N/A	15,267	15,889	10,327	25,305	31,328
Van Ferit Melen Airport	Van	Eastern Anatolia region	VAN/LTCI	1,164,400	1,628,570	1,549,671	1,311,014	1,265,467	976,311	1,413,367	1,547,838	1,661,535	1,481,873	1,386,321	1,207,145	1,124,740	1,001,344	1,057,132	892,050	745,493	585,319	549,521
Zonguldak Airport	Zonguldak	Black Sea region	ONQ/LTAS	139,481	140,382	128,470	109,770	55,890	9,776	28,908	24,861	24,139	23,086	27,631	30,722	25,742	27,711	20,462	29,754	5,142	N/A	N/A
Batman Airport	Batman	Southeastern Anatolia region	BAL/LTCJ	737,301	644,089	549,846	424,697	526,546	371,583	524,010	665,306	519,336	439,634	197,433	434,849	420,170	497,418	173,943	185,888	165,482	143,290	97,247
Şırnak Airport	Şırnak	Southeastern Anatolia region	NKT/LTCV	421,160	417,488	401,663	282,798	312,973	227,286	365,865	425,345	339,841	241,311	273,467	254,254	39,074	N/A	N/A	N/A	N/A	N/A	N/A
Iğdır Airport	Iğdır	Eastern Anatolia region	IGD/LTCT	385,438	383,174	354,506	213,136	191,870	134,472	261,255	289,251	248,005	216,252	212,104	198,270	216,715	55,225	N/A	N/A	N/A	N/A	N/A
Domestic Lines				101,574,184	95,356,111	90,390,766	78,323,824	68,466,177	49,740,303	99,946,572	112,911,108	109,511,390	102,499,358	97,041,210	85,416,166	76,148,526	64,721,316	58,258,324	50,575,426	41,226,959	35,832,776	31,949,341
International Lines				145,202,376	134,935,120	123,302,397	103,465,515	59,689,585	31,875,837	108,427,124	97,587,056	83,533,953	71,244,179	84,033,321	80,304,068	73,281,895	65,630,304	59,362,145	52,224,966	44,281,549	43,605,513	38,347,191
Direct Transit				404,402	542,680	443,412	436,192	194,460	87,545	537,642	449,475	531,501	409,609	362,473	461,105	565,447	677,896	671,531	736,121	492,835	449,091	418,731
Total(including direct transit)				247,180,962	230,833,911	214,136,575	182,225,531	128,350,222	81,703,685	208,911,338	210,947,639	193,576,844	174,153,146	181,437,004	166,181,339	149,995,868	131,029,516	118,292,000	103,536,513	86,001,343	79,887,380	70,715,263
