= MQM =

MQM may refer to:

== Political parties ==
- Muttahida Qaumi Movement – London (MQM), a political party based in the United Kingdom, by Pakistani Muhajirs (British Pakistanis).
- Muttahida Qaumi Movement – Pakistan (MQM-P), a political party in Pakistan, which speaks for the rights of the Muhajir ethnic-group of Pakistan.
- Muhajir Qaumi Movement – Haqiqi (MQM-H), a political party in Pakistan, which speaks for the rights of the Muhajir ethnic-group of Pakistan.

== Places ==
- Mardin Airport, an airport in Mardin, southeastern Turkey (IATA: MQM)

== Other uses ==
- South Marquesan language (ISO 639-3: mqm)
