= Flight 158 =

Flight 158 may refer to:

- Philippine Air Lines Flight 158, crashed on 12 September 1969
- Turkish Airlines Flight 158, crashed on 16 January 1983
