= İzmir Adnan Menderes Airport =

Airport in İzmir, Turkey

İzmir Adnan Menderes Airport İzmir Adnan Menderes Havalimanı

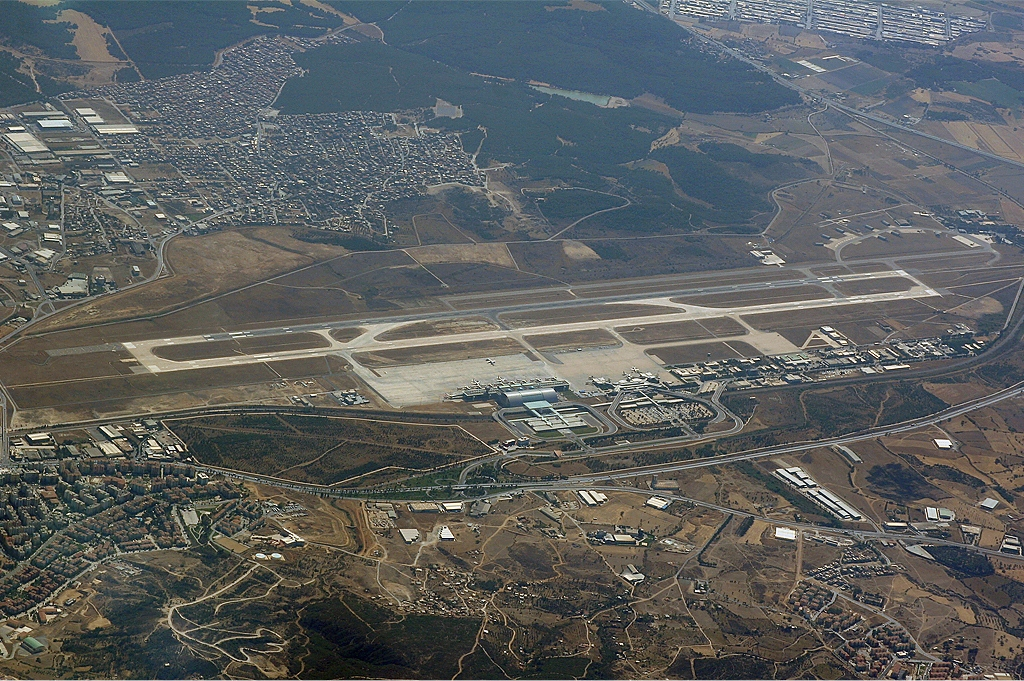
- IATA: ADB; ICAO: LTBJ

Summary
- Airport type: Public
- Owner: General Directorate of State Airports (DHMİ)
- Operator: TAV Airports
- Serves: İzmir, Turkey
- Location: Gaziemir, İzmir, Turkey
- Opened: 17 November 1987; 38 years ago
- Focus city for: Turkish Airlines
- Operating base for: Corendon Airlines; Pegasus Airlines; SunExpress
- Elevation AMSL: 412 ft (126 m)
- Coordinates: 38°17′26″N 027°09′19″E
- Website: www.adnanmenderesairport.com

Map
- Location of airport in Turkey ADB/LTBJ (Turkey) ADB/LTBJ (Asia)

Runways
Direction	Length		Surface
Direction	m	ft	Surface
16R/34L	3,240	10,630	Concrete
16L/34R	3,240	10,630	Composite

Statistics (2025)
- Annual passenger capacity: 13,000,000
- Passengers: 12,665,660
- Passenger change 2024–25: ▲10%
- Aircraft movements: 84,848
- Movements change 2024–25: ▲8%
- Source: Turkish AIP at EUROCONTROL; Passenger Traffic, ACI Europe

İzmir Adnan Menderes Airport (IATA: ADB, ICAO: LTBJ) is an international airport serving the city of İzmir and most of the surrounding İzmir province in Turkey. It is named after former Turkish prime minister Adnan Menderes (1899–1961).

== Overview ==
İzmir's main airport is located 14 km (8.7 mi) southwest of the city center in the Gaziemir district along the D.550/E87 highway, which continues south through Selçuk and Aydın before eventually reaching Gökova in Muğla. The new international terminal, which was designed by Yakup Hazan Architecture, opened in September 2006, with the new domestic terminal opening around March 2014. It replaced Çiğli Air Base which is now used only as a military base.

In 2025, ADB served 12.7 million passengers, 7.6 million of which were domestic passengers. It ranks 5th among Turkish airports in terms of total passenger traffic (after Istanbul Airport, Sabiha Gökçen Airport, Antalya Airport, Ankara Esenboğa Airport), and 4th in terms of domestic passenger traffic (after Istanbul Airport, Sabiha Gökçen Airport and Ankara Esenboğa Airport) within the country. It is also one of the busiest airports in the Middle East.

ADB has two runways, 16R/34L and 16L/34R; however, the two runways cannot operate simultaneously due to both their proximity and the lack of a dedicated taxiway to runway 16R/34L in the past. This has led to the use of runway 16L/34R as the primary runway, while runway 16R/34L is used mostly as a parallel taxiway, although it is available for use as a backup if the main runway is undergoing maintenance or is unavailable for any other reason. In efforts to expand the airport's facilities, existing entrance taxiways were refurbished, along with the construction of a parallel taxiway, entrance taxiways, and aprons for passenger and cargo aircraft, as well as for de-icing. Completed in March 2020, the new 280,000 m^{2} (3,000,000 sq ft) apron area increased the remote parking capacity of the airport from 35 to 61 with a total of 26 new spaces – eight of which are designated for use by private aircraft. In 2020, Adnan Menderes Airport was named one of the best European airports with a capacity of 5 – 15 million passengers by Airports Council International.

== Airlines and destinations ==
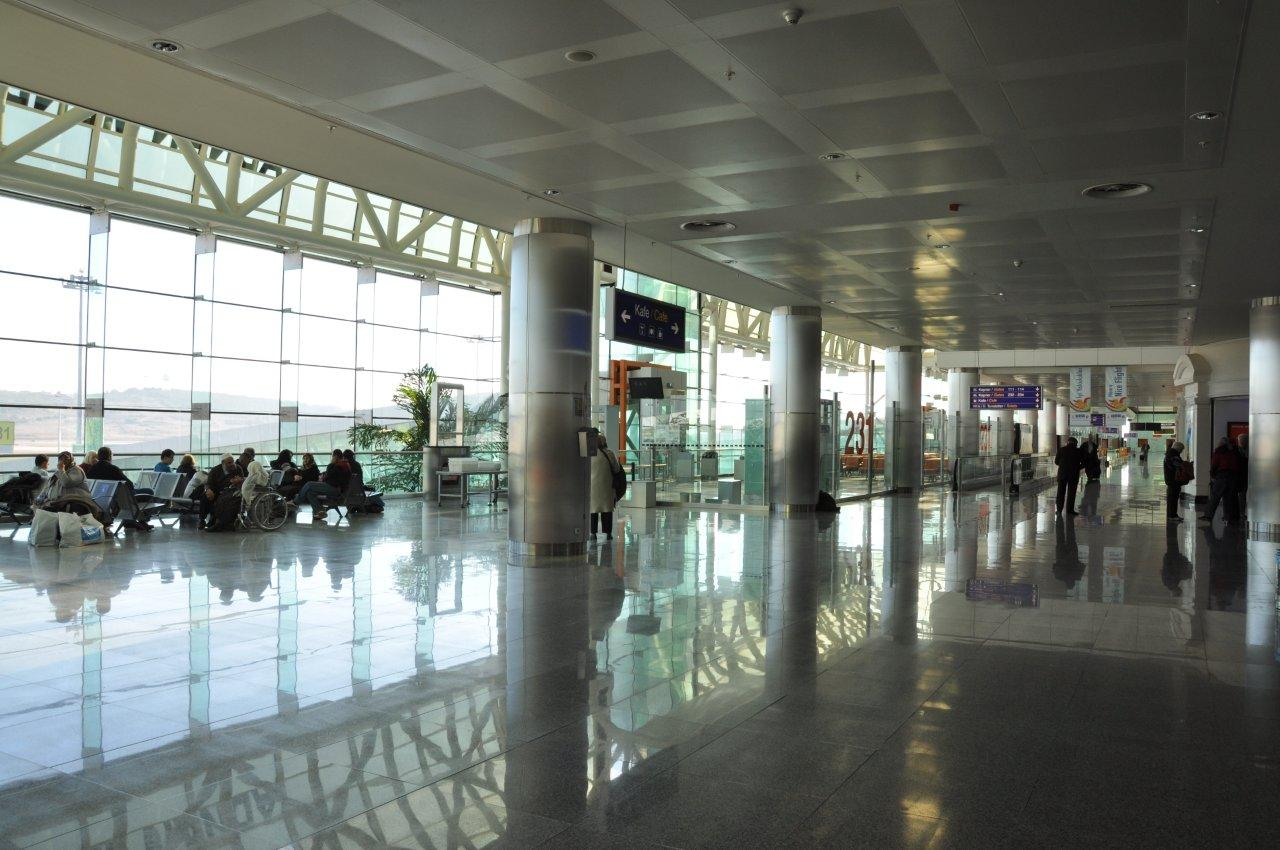
Interior view

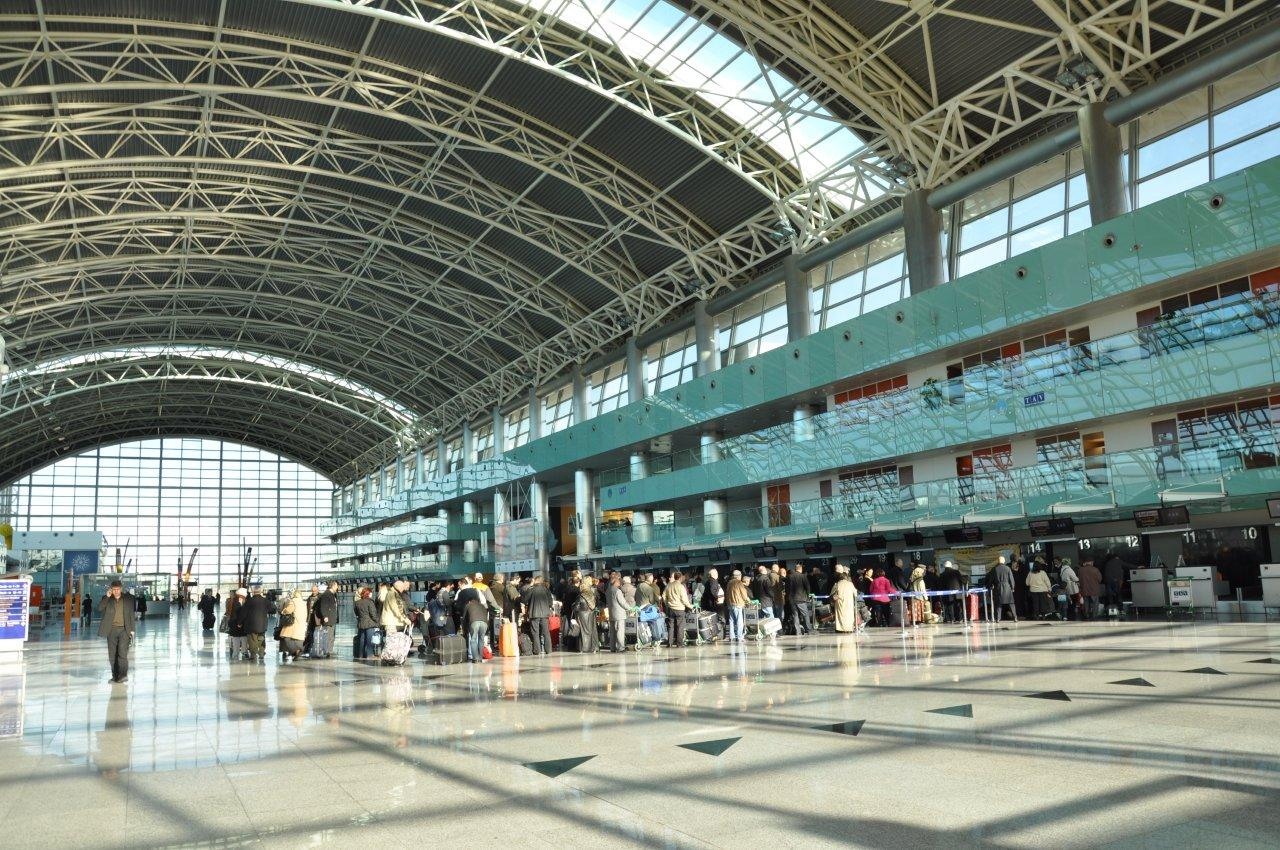
Interior view

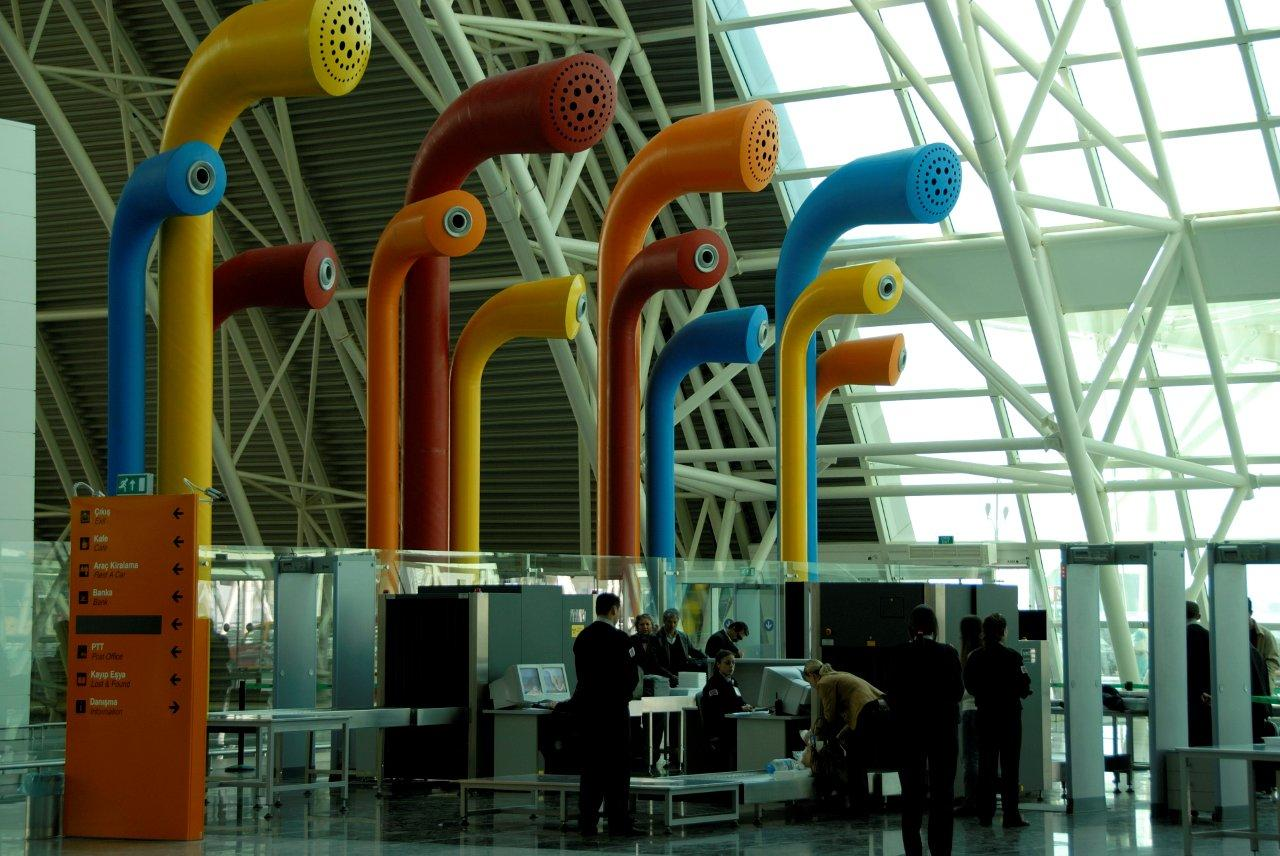
Interior view

=== Passenger ===
The following airlines operate regular scheduled and charter flights at İzmir Adnan Menderes Airport:

Airlines	Destinations
Aegean Airlines	Athens; Seasonal: Thessaloniki
Aer Lingus	Dublin
Air Montenegro	Seasonal: Tivat
Air Samarkand	Seasonal: Tashkent
Air Serbia	Seasonal: Belgrade
AJet	Ankara, Ercan, Istanbul–Sabiha Gökçen, Şanlıurfa; Seasonal: Belgrade, Ordu-Giresun
Azerbaijan Airlines	Seasonal: Baku
Belavia	Seasonal charter: Minsk
British Airways	Seasonal: London–Heathrow
Caspian Airlines	Tehran–Imam Khomeini
Corendon Airlines	Seasonal: Amsterdam, Berlin, Brussels, Cologne/Bonn, Düsseldorf, Frankfurt, Hamburg, Hannover, Munich, Nuremberg, Paris–Charles de Gaulle, Stuttgart, Vienna
easyJet	Seasonal: London–Gatwick, London–Luton, Manchester
Enter Air	Seasonal charter: Gdańsk, Katowice, Poznań, Warsaw–Chopin
Eurowings	Seasonal: Cologne/Bonn, Düsseldorf, Stuttgart
Fly Kıbrıs Airlines	Ercan
FlyOne	Seasonal charter: Chișinău
Freebird Airlines	Seasonal charter: Brussels, Medina
GetJet Airlines	Seasonal charter: Vilnius
I-Fly	Seasonal charter: Moscow–Vnukovo
Iran Airtour	Tehran–Imam Khomeini
Jet2.com	Seasonal: Birmingham, Bristol, East Midlands, Glasgow, Leeds/Bradford, London–Stansted, Manchester, Newcastle upon Tyne
LOT Polish Airlines	Seasonal charter: Katowice, Warsaw–Chopin
Lufthansa	Seasonal: Munich
Luxair	Seasonal: Luxembourg
Meraj Airlines	Tehran–Imam Khomeini
Pegasus Airlines	Adana/Mersin, Ağrı, Ankara, Baku, Basel/Mulhouse, Barcelona, Batman, Cologne/Bonn, Düsseldorf, Elazığ, Ercan, Erzincan, Hamburg, Hatay, Gaziantep, Istanbul, Istanbul–Sabiha Gökçen, Jeddah, Kayseri, Kraków, London–Stansted, Madrid, Mardin, Muş, Podgorica, Samsun, Şanlıurfa, Sivas, Skopje, Stuttgart, Tokat, Trabzon, Vienna, Zürich; Seasonal: Amman–Queen Alia, Berlin, Copenhagen, Frankfurt, Lisbon, Moscow–Domodedovo, Munich, Nuremberg, Ordu-Giresun, Tbilisi
Saudia	Seasonal: Jeddah, Riyadh
Smartwings	Seasonal: Prague; Seasonal charter: Katowice, Poznań, Warsaw–Chopin
SunExpress	Abu Dhabi, Adana/Mersin, Aleppo, Almaty, Amsterdam, Antalya, Athens, Basel/Mulhouse, Berlin, Bremen, Brussels, Cologne/Bonn, Damascus, Diyarbakır, Dubai–International, Düsseldorf, Elazığ, Ercan, Erzurum, Frankfurt, Gaziantep, Hamburg, Hannover, Iğdır, Kars, Kayseri, Konya, London–Gatwick, London–Stansted, Malatya, Manchester, Mardin, Milan–Malpensa, Munich, Nuremberg, Saarbrücken, Samarkand, Samsun, Sharm El Sheikh, Sivas, Skopje, Stuttgart, Şanlıurfa, Tashkent, Trabzon, Van, Vienna, Zürich; Seasonal: Barcelona, Beirut, Birmingham, Bodrum, Budapest, Bucharest–Otopeni (begins 30 March 2027), Chișinău (begins 12 May 2027), Copenhagen, Cork, Dortmund, Dublin, Eindhoven, Geneva, Madrid, Nantes, Oslo, Paris–Charles de Gaulle, Porto, Podgorica, Prague, Pristina, Rome–Fiumicino, Rotterdam, Rovaniemi, Saint Petersburg, Sarajevo, Sofia, Stockholm–Arlanda, Tbilisi, Tel Aviv, Tirana, Venice, Warsaw–Chopin; Seasonal charter: Plovdiv
Transavia	Seasonal: Lyon, Paris–Orly
TUI fly Belgium	Seasonal: Brussels, Ostend/Bruges
TUI fly Netherlands	Seasonal: Amsterdam
Turkish Airlines	Istanbul

== Traffic statistics ==
Izmir–Adnan Menderes International Airport Passenger Traffic Statistics
Year (months)	Domestic	% change	International	% change	Total	% change
2025	7,584,560	▲13%	5,081,100	▲6%	12,665,660	▲10%
2024	6,692,978	▲4%	4,814,318	▲16%	11,507,296	▲9%
2023	6,415,091	▲6%	4,141,108	▲10%	10,556,199	▲7%
2022	6,074,056	▲5%	3,760,522	▲110%	9,834,578	▲30%
2021	5,776,477	▲29%	1,792,577	▲80%	7,569,054	▲39%
2020	4,469,524	▼51%	995,334	▼70%	5,464,858	▼56%
2019	9,031,924	▼15%	3,333,332	▲22%	12,365,256	▼8%
2018	10,679,606	▲2%	2,730,772	▲16%	13,410,378	▲5%
2017	10,474,760	▲5%	2,349,550	▲12%	12,824,310	▲6%
2016	9,955,167	▲4%	2,096,076	▼20%	12,051,243	▼1%
2015	9,545,443	▲14%	2,632,657	▲2%	12,178,100	▲11%
2014	8,390,425	▲8%	2,580,238	▲4%	10,970,663	▲7%
2013	7,753,983	▲12%	2,479,157	▲3%	10,233,140	▲9%
2012	6,945,044	▲13%	2,410,858	▲1%	9,355,902	▲10%
2011	6,125,076	▲14%	2,398,457	▲13%	8,523,533	▲14%
2010	5,357,610	▲18%	2,127,488	▲28%	7,485,098	▲21%
2009	4,534,339	▲21%	1,667,455	▼2%	6,201,794	▲14%
2008	3,757,891	▲3%	1,697,407	▲6%	5,455,298	▲4%
2007	3,635,414	▲23%	1,600,890	▲10%	5,236,304	▲19%
2006	2,959,973	▲49%	1,451,061	▼13%	4,411,034	▲21%
2005	1,983,831	▲41%	1,676,755	▲9%	3,660,586	▲24%
2004	1,403,321	▲42%	1,538,960	▲14%	2,942,281	▲26%
2003	985,052	▲3%	1,352,697	▼11%	2,337,749	▼6%
2002	960,119	▼2%	1,523,273	▲3%	2,489,392	▲1%
2001	980,651	▼20%	1,483,627	▲16%	2,464,278	▼2%
2000	1,226,294	Steady	1,281,095	Steady	2,507,389	Steady

== Ground transport ==
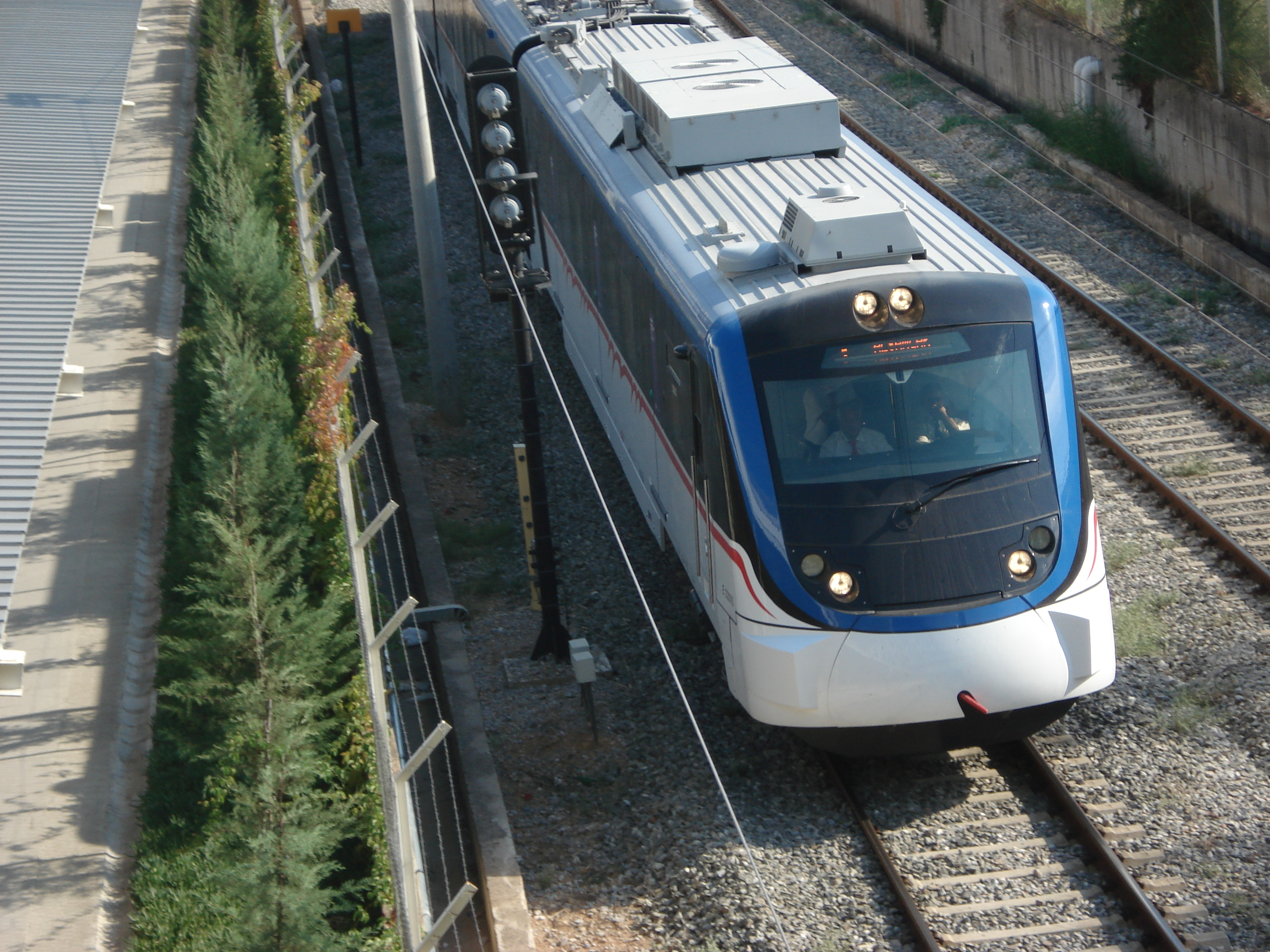
İZBAN commuter trains connect the airport with İzmir's city center

=== Road ===
The airport can be reached from İzmir via the 200, 202, 204 or 206 ESHOT buses or by Havaş airport shuttle buses (every 20 minutes, 35 to 60 minutes) from the Turkish Airlines office.

=== Rail ===
İZBAN commuter rail trains stop at the Airport Station about every 10 mins at peak hours and 20 mins off peak.

Intercity trains operated by the Turkish State Railways also stop at the Airport Station. There are currently about 14 daily trains in both directions. Northbound trains all go to Basmane Terminal in the city center, while southbound trains serve Ödemiş, Tire, Söke, Aydın, Nazilli Torbalı and stations in between.

== See also ==
- List of the busiest airports in Turkey
- List of the busiest airports in the Middle East
