= Cologne Bonn Airport =

Airport in North Rhine-Westphalia, Germany

Cologne Bonn Airport Flughafen Köln/Bonn

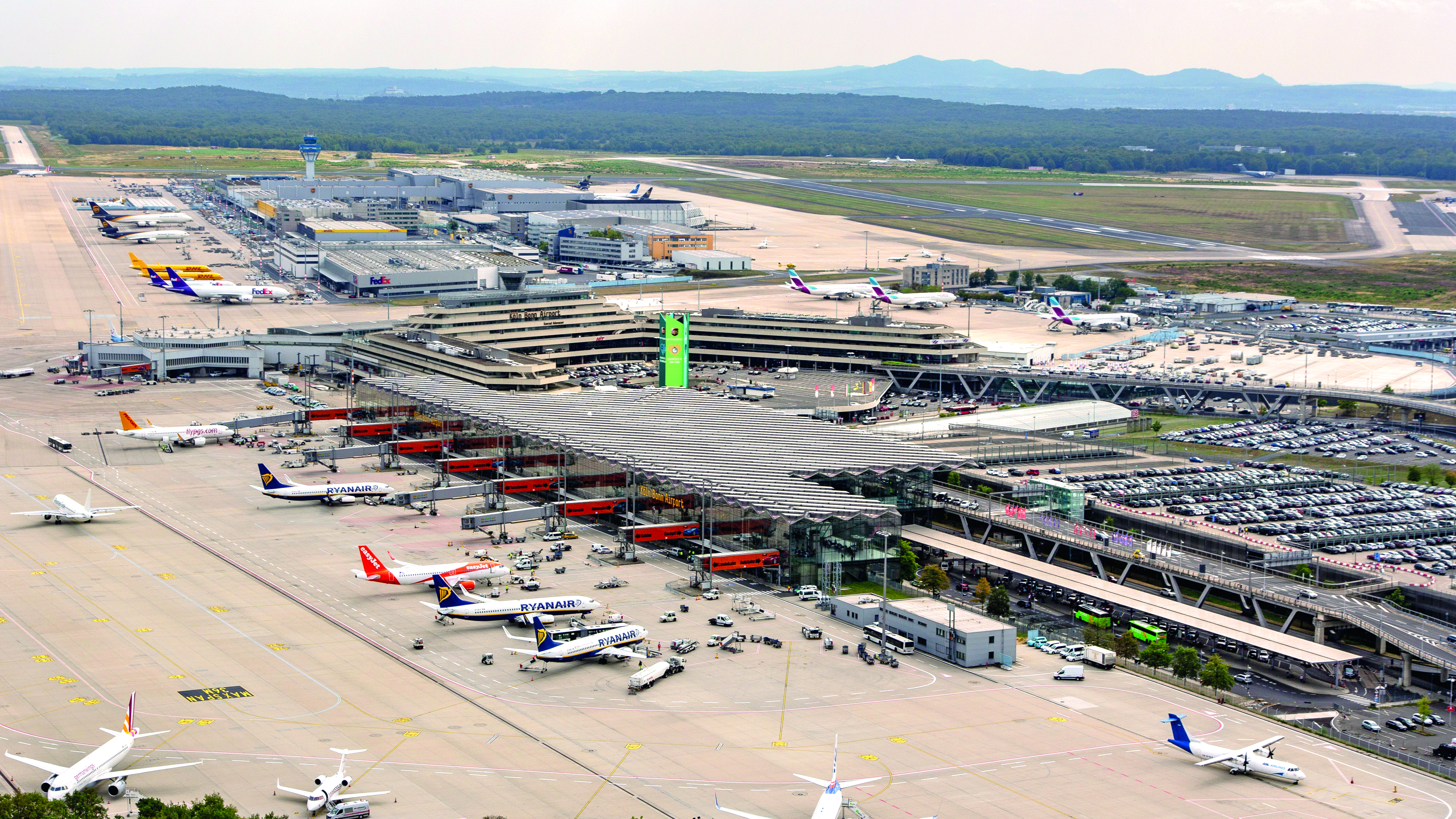
- IATA: CGN; ICAO: EDDK

Summary
- Airport type: Public / Military
- Owner/Operator: Flughafen Köln/Bonn GmbH
- Serves: Cologne Bonn Region
- Location: Wahn, Porz, Cologne, North Rhine-Westphalia, Germany
- Opened: 18 July 1957; 69 years ago
- Hub for: FedEx Express; UPS Airlines
- Operating base for: Corendon Airlines Europe; Eurowings; Ryanair
- Built: 1939; 87 years ago
- Elevation AMSL: 302 ft (92 m)
- Coordinates: 50°51′57″N 7°8′34″E
- Website: www.koeln-bonn-airport.de

Maps
- Airport map

- Location of airport in Germany CGN/EDDK (Germany) CGN/EDDK (Europe)

Runways
Direction	Length		Surface
Direction	m	ft	Surface
06/24	2,459	8,068	Concrete/asphalt
13L/31R	3,815	12,516	Asphalt
13R/31L	1,863	6,112	Concrete/asphalt

Statistics (2025)
- Passengers: 10,060,452 ▲+0.5%
- Aircraft movements: 116,281 ▼-0.9%
- Cargo (metric tons): 842,377 ▼-0.4%
- Sources: Passenger Traffic, ADV, AIP at German air traffic control.

Cologne Bonn Airport (German: Flughafen Köln/Bonn „Konrad Adenauer“) (IATA: CGN, ICAO: EDDK) is an international airport in north-western Germany. It serves the country's fourth-largest city Cologne, as well as Bonn, the former capital of West Germany. In 2024, more than 10 million passengers passed through Cologne Bonn Airport (CGN). It is the first time that passenger numbers have exceeded those in 2019 and hence marks a return to pre-pandemic levels. It is the seventh-largest passenger airport in Germany and the third-largest in terms of cargo operations. By traffic units, which combines cargo and passengers, the airport is in fifth position in Germany. As of March 2015, Cologne Bonn Airport had services to 115 passenger destinations in 35 countries. The airport is named after Cologne native Konrad Adenauer, the first post-war Chancellor of West Germany. The facility covers 1,000 hectares (2,500 acres) and contains three runways.

The airport is located in the district of Porz and is surrounded by Wahner Heide, a nature reserve. The airport is centrally located in the Cologne Bonn Region 12 km (7.5 mi; 6.5 nmi) southeast of the Cologne city centre and 16 km (9.9 mi; 8.6 nmi) northeast of Bonn. Cologne Bonn Airport is one of the country's few 24-hour airports and serves as a hub for Eurowings, FedEx Express and UPS Airlines as well as a focus city for several leisure and low-cost airlines. It is also a host of a training centre for the German (DLR) and European (EAC) astronaut programmes, part of the European Space Agency. The German Aerospace Center (DLR) formerly used an Airbus A300 ZERO-G aircraft at Cologne/Bonn Airport to simulate zero gravity conditions for research. This aircraft, also known as the "Zero G", is no longer used for research flights but has been stationed at the airport since 2015 and is now an interactive museum exhibit. It can be found outside of the airport, near close to Terminal 2.

Cologne Bonn airport is only 49 km (30 mi; 26 nmi) south of larger Düsseldorf Airport, the main airport of the Rhine-Ruhr region, and also competes with Frankfurt Airport, Germany's largest international airport, which can be reached from Cologne within 47 minutes by the Intercity Express high-speed train. The airport is jointly owned by the City of Cologne (31.12%), the Federal Republic of Germany (30.94%), the State of North Rhine-Westphalia (30.94%), the City of Bonn (6.06%) and two counties: Rhein-Sieg-Kreis (0.59%) and Rheinisch-Bergischer Kreis (0.35%).

== History ==
=== 20th century ===
The airport's sound logo

In 1938, the first airfield was built on site for the German Luftwaffe. After World War II the British military took over and expanded the airport (as RAF Wahn - B-119). A 1,866 m runway was built in this period.

The following squadrons used RAF Wahn: 2 Squadron between 28 June 1948 and 15 September 1949 then again between 1 July 1953 and 28 October 1955, 4 Squadron between 13 November 1947 and 1 March 1948 then the squadron alternating with RAF Lubeck until 19 September 1949, 11 Squadron between 15 September 1948 and 17 September 1949, 14 Squadron between 1 April 1946 and 16 September 1949, 17 Squadron between 1 June 1956 and 3 April 1957, 21 Squadron between 3 and 26 September 1946, 68 Squadron between 1 January 1952 and 22 July 1957, 69 Squadron between 31 March 1946 and 7 November 1947, 87 Squadron between 1 January 1952 and 2 July 1957, 98 Squadron between 15 March 1946 and 19 September 1949, 107 Squadron between 3 September 1946 and 15 September 1948, 128 Squadron between 11 and 31 March 1946, 180 Squadron between 8 and 31 March 1946 & 305 Squadron between 11 March and 15 October 1946.

In 1950 the airport was opened for civilian air traffic to serve both Cologne and West Germany's then new capital, Bonn, superseding the former Cologne Butzweilerhof Airport.

The first scheduled international route was London-Cologne/Bonn-Berlin operated by BEA, inaugurated on 1 January 1951. A second and third runway was opened in 1954 and 1961 subsequently. That same year Lufthansa inaugurated the first scheduled intercontinental service from Cologne/Bonn to New York City.

The new passenger terminal, which still exists today as Terminal 1, was inaugurated in 1970. The airport's passenger and freight facilities have been extended substantially during the 1970s. In 1978, the airport handled more than 2 million passengers for the first time.

Cologne Bonn Airport was chosen by United Parcel Service (UPS) in 1986 as the location for their European hub. TNT Express followed in 1988.

By 1990, the airport handled three million passengers per year. In the mid-1990s the airport started another major expansion program. Several new parking lots, a new control tower and a second terminal were built, and in 2004 a new long-distance railway station connecting the airport with InterCityExpress trains was opened.

=== Cultural significance ===
The airport's design and atmosphere have also influenced popular culture. In 1977, musician Brian Eno was inspired by the architecture and ambiance of Cologne Bonn Airport while waiting for a flight. He later described it as "a very beautiful building [...] The light was beautiful, everything was beautiful, except they were playing awful music." This experience led him to create his groundbreaking 1978 ambient music album "Music for Airports" which was designed to "induce calm and a space to think" in airport environments. Eno sought to create background music that, unlike the "lightweight" music typically played in such spaces, would complement the architectural aesthetics of modern airports like Cologne Bonn.

=== Developments since the 2000s ===
Coinciding with the start of several low-cost airlines in Germany, Cologne/Bonn opened new capacities. This enabled the airport to make competitive offers to the airlines. Consequently, Germanwings and TUIfly started operations from Cologne/Bonn as their hub in the fall of 2002. As a result, the number of passengers in 2003 rose by 43% compared to 2002. These airlines were joined by easyJet in late 2003 and Wizz Air in June 2006.

Also, the Canadian Forces began to use the airport as a staging area to move troops and supplies in support of humanitarian missions and possible anti-terrorism roles.

In 2006, the Brazilian airline BRA provided a twice a week connection to Rio de Janeiro–Galeão, which was discontinued in April 2007 due to problems with the airline. Also in 2006, a daily transatlantic flight to New Jersey's Newark Liberty International Airport by Continental Airlines was established, operating with a Boeing 757-200. This route was discontinued on 4 September 2008 due to a reduction in passenger numbers.

Low-cost carriers Ryanair and Norwegian Air Shuttle began service to Cologne/Bonn in May 2012. In April 2014, Ryanair announced the opening of their fifth German base at Cologne/Bonn Airport for October 2014. In December 2014, Lufthansa announced it would base Eurowings' new long-haul operations at Cologne Bonn Airport with flights to Florida, Southern Africa and the Indian Ocean to start by the end of 2015. Meanwhile, Condor cancelled their service to Varadero after only one season due to the expected competition. In February 2018, Eurowings announced the relocation of all long-haul operations from Cologne consisting of four Airbus A330 aircraft to Düsseldorf Airport by late October 2018 leaving the airport without any long-haul passenger routes again. In 2024, Wizz Air announced it would terminate all routes from Cologne/Bonn, which it had served for ten years.

== Facilities ==
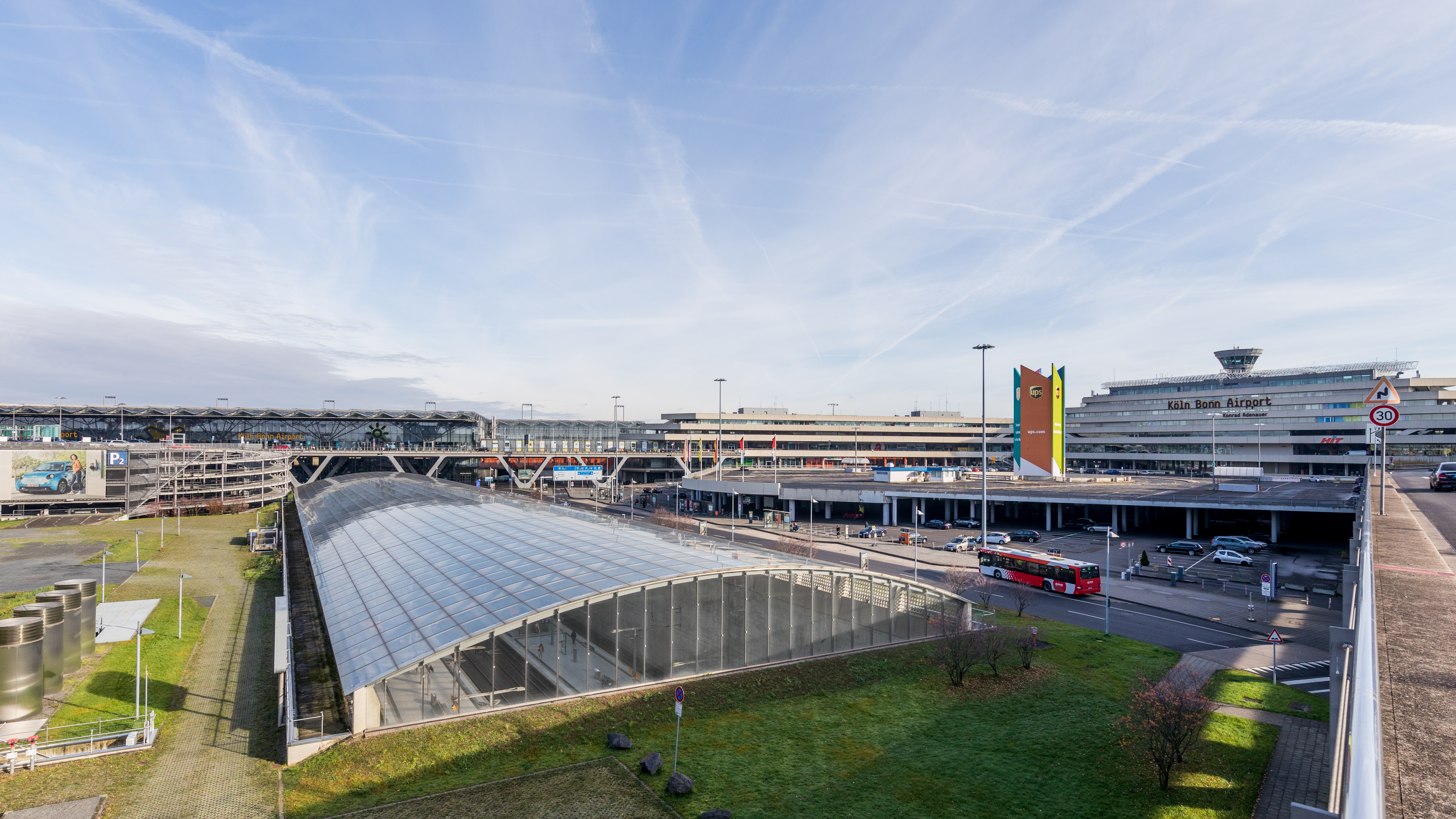
Terminals 1 (right) and 2 (left) with the airport railway station visible under its glass roof.

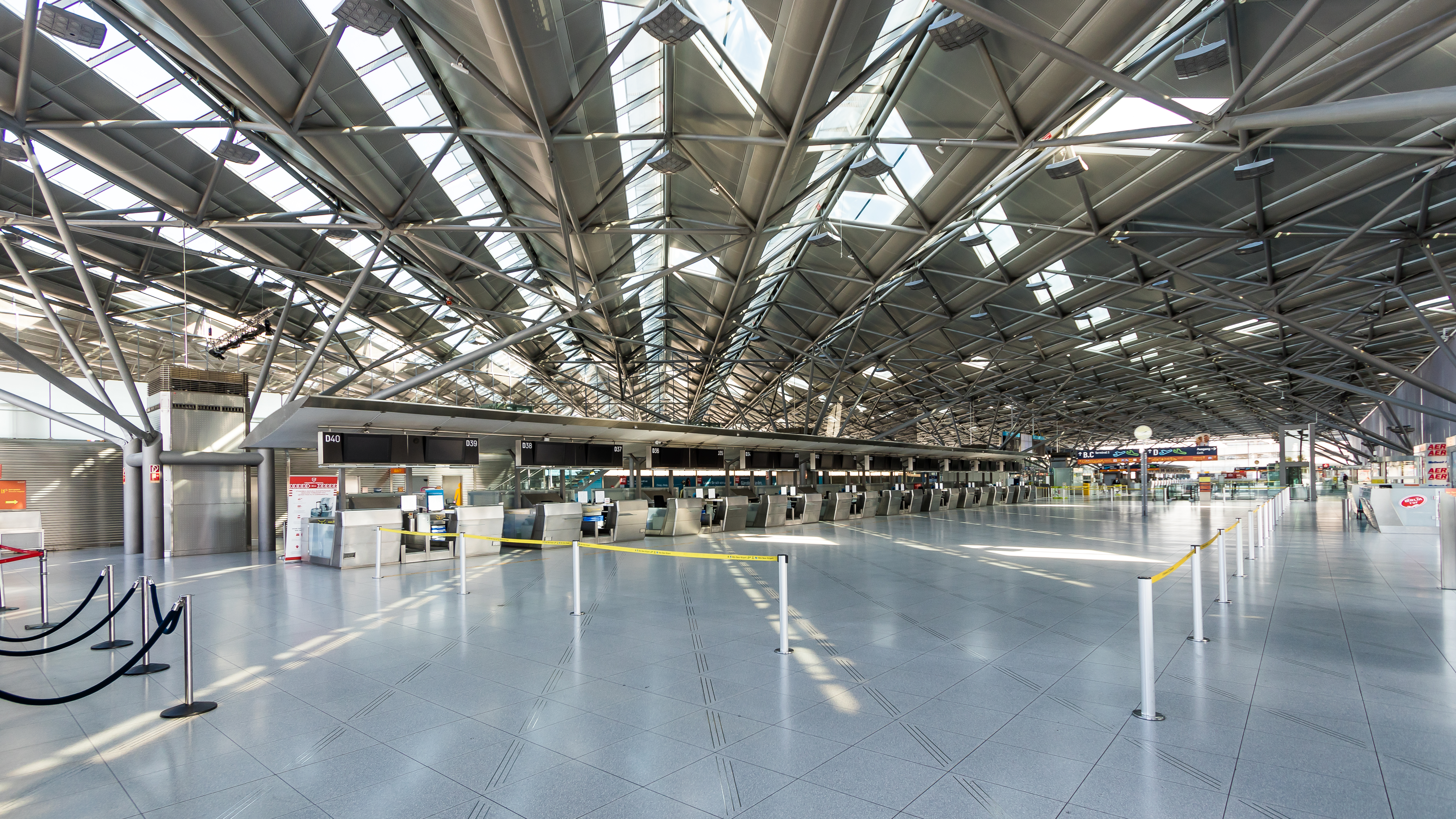
Terminal 2 interior

Cologne Bonn Airport has two passenger terminals which are located directly beside each other.

=== Terminal 1 ===
The older Terminal 1 is a 1970s building that sports large surfaces of bare concrete in its design. It features a u-shaped main building with shops, restaurants, check-in and service facilities and a visitors deck on its roof as well as the star-shaped piers B and C with five aircraft stands each plus a central airside hall between them added in 2004 with joint security-check facilities, more shops and restaurants as well as three additional stands. All ten stands at both piers feature jet bridges while the other three use walk-boarding. Also several bus-boarding stands are available at the apron. Terminal 1 is used by Eurowings, which occupy most of the landside check-in facilities, Lufthansa and Austrian Airlines. Terminal 1 features its own direct connection to the railway station.

=== Terminal 2 ===
Construction of Terminal 2 began in June 1997, and operations at the terminal commenced on 21 June 2000. It is located to the north of Terminal 1. Both feature separate check-in facilities but are connected through a landside walkway. Terminal 2 is a modern-style rectangular building made out of glass and steel which is equipped with eight stands with jet bridges as well as several stands for bus-boarding. It is used by several airlines such as Ryanair. Terminal 2 is also directly connected to the airports' railway station via the basement level. The terminal hosts an interdenominational prayer room on its base level.

== Airlines and destinations ==
=== Passenger ===
The following airlines offer regular scheduled and charter flights at Cologne Bonn Airport:

Airlines	Destinations
Aegean Airlines	Seasonal: Thessaloniki
Air Arabia Maroc	Nador, Tangier
Air Cairo	Cairo, Hurghada, Luxor, Marsa Alam
Air Mediterranean	Athens
Air Serbia	Niš
AJet	Istanbul–Sabiha Gökçen; Seasonal: Ankara, Sivas
Austrian Airlines	Vienna (ends 11 January 2027)
British Airways	Seasonal: London-Heathrow (resumes 23 November 2026)
Condor	Seasonal: Palma de Mallorca
Corendon Airlines	Antalya, Gran Canaria, Hurghada, Istanbul, (begins 1 July 2027), Marsa Alam (begins 5 November 2026), Sharm el Sheikh, Tenerife–South, Zonguldak; Seasonal: Balıkesir, Burgas (begins 9 May 2027), Adana/Mersin, Ankara, Fuerteventura, Gazipaşa, Izmir, Rhodes, Varna (begins 15 May 2027)
Eurowings	Alicante, Athens, Barcelona, Berlin, Bologna, Budapest, Catania, Chișinău, Copenhagen (begins 7 May 2027), Funchal, Gran Canaria, Jeddah, Lanzarote, Lisbon, London–Gatwick, Milan–Malpensa, Munich, Nador, Palma de Mallorca, Porto, Pristina, Rome–Fiumicino, Sarajevo, Split, Tbilisi, Thessaloniki, Tunis, Vienna, Zagreb, Zurich; Seasonal: Bari, Bastia, Belgrade, Brindisi, Burgas, Corfu, Dubrovnik, Edinburgh, Erbil, Faro, Fez, Fuerteventura, Heraklion, Hurghada, Ibiza, Kavala, Kayseri, Klagenfurt, Kos, Lamezia Terme, Málaga, Marsa Alam, Menorca, Monastir, Naples, Nice, Olbia, Palermo, Pisa, Prague, Pula, Rhodes, Rijeka, Santorini, Stockholm–Arlanda, Tangier, Tenerife–South, Tirana, Valencia, Varna, Venice, Verona, Yerevan, Zadar
Freebird Airlines	Antalya
GP Aviation	Pristina
Jet2.com	Seasonal: Birmingham, Bristol (begins 27 November 2026), Leeds/Bradford, London–Gatwick (begins 26 November 2026), Manchester, Newcastle upon Tyne
LEAV Aviation	Aleppo, Deir ez-Zor; Seasonal: Antalya, Heraklion, Kos, Palma de Mallorca, Rhodes
Lufthansa	Munich
Lufthansa City Airlines	Munich
Nesma Airlines	Hurghada
Nile Air	Cairo
Pegasus Airlines	Ankara, Diyarbakır, Gaziantep, Istanbul–Sabiha Gökçen, Kayseri; Seasonal: Adana/Mersin, Antalya, Bodrum, Elazığ, Izmir
Ryanair	Agadir, Alicante, Barcelona, Bergamo, Bologna, Dublin, Faro, Fuerteventura, Gran Canaria, Kaunas, Lisbon, London–Stansted, Málaga, Malta, Manchester, Marrakesh, Palermo, Palma de Mallorca, Paphos, Porto, Riga, Rome, Seville, Sofia, Stockholm–Arlanda, Tenerife–South, Tirana, Valencia, Vienna; Seasonal: Athens, Corfu, Knock, Rimini, Zadar
SunExpress	Antalya, Izmir; Seasonal: Adana/Mersin, Ankara, Bodrum, Dalaman, Elazığ, Kayseri, Samsun, Trabzon
Turkish Airlines	Istanbul
Wizz Air	Bucharest–Otopeni, Chisinau, Podgorica, Skopje, Tirana, Tuzla (ends 10 January 2027)

=== Cargo ===
Cologne Bonn Airport is a hub for FedEx Express and UPS Airlines, which operates 140 flights per week at the airport alone.

Airlines	Destinations
Cargojet	Hamilton (ON), St. John's
Coyne Airways	Amsterdam, Frankfurt, London–Heathrow, Tbilisi, Yerevan
EgyptAir Cargo	Cairo
FedEx Express	Bengaluru, Guangzhou, Memphis, Paris–Charles de Gaulle, Tel Aviv
MNG Airlines	Istanbul, New York–JFK
Turkish Cargo	Istanbul
UPS Airlines	Ancona, Barcelona, Basel/Mulhouse, Bengaluru, Bergamo, Billund, Budapest, Bucharest–Otopeni, Delhi–Indira Gandhi, Dubai–International, Dublin, East Midlands, Edinburgh, Geneva, Helsinki, Hong Kong, Istanbul, Katowice, Larnaca, London–Stansted, Louisville, Lyon, Madrid, Malmö, Marseille, Mumbai–Shivaji, Munich, Newark, Naples, Oslo, Ostrava, Paris–Charles de Gaulle, Philadelphia, Porto, Prague, Rome–Ciampino, Shanghai–Pudong, Shenzhen, Stockholm–Arlanda, Sofia, Tel Aviv, Timișoara, Valencia, Venice, Vienna, Warsaw–Chopin, Wrocław

== Military use ==
The German Air Force's Executive Transport Wing is based on the south-western side of the airport, adjacent to the Wahn Air Force Barracks. The military part of the airport is also used by the Canadian Forces as an operational support hub.

== Statistics ==
Direct flight destinations from Cologne Bonn Airport (April 2026)

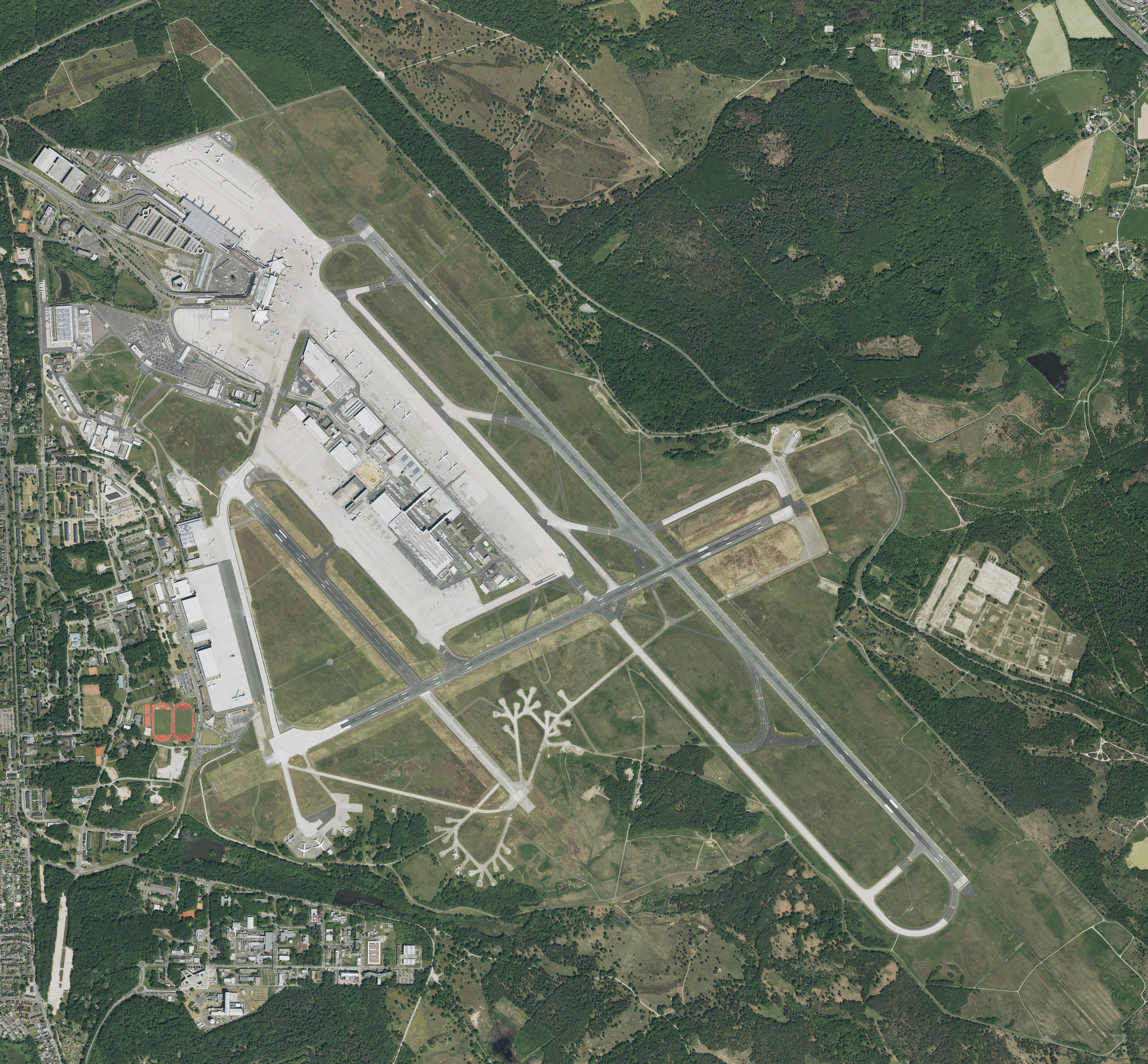
Aerial view of the airport

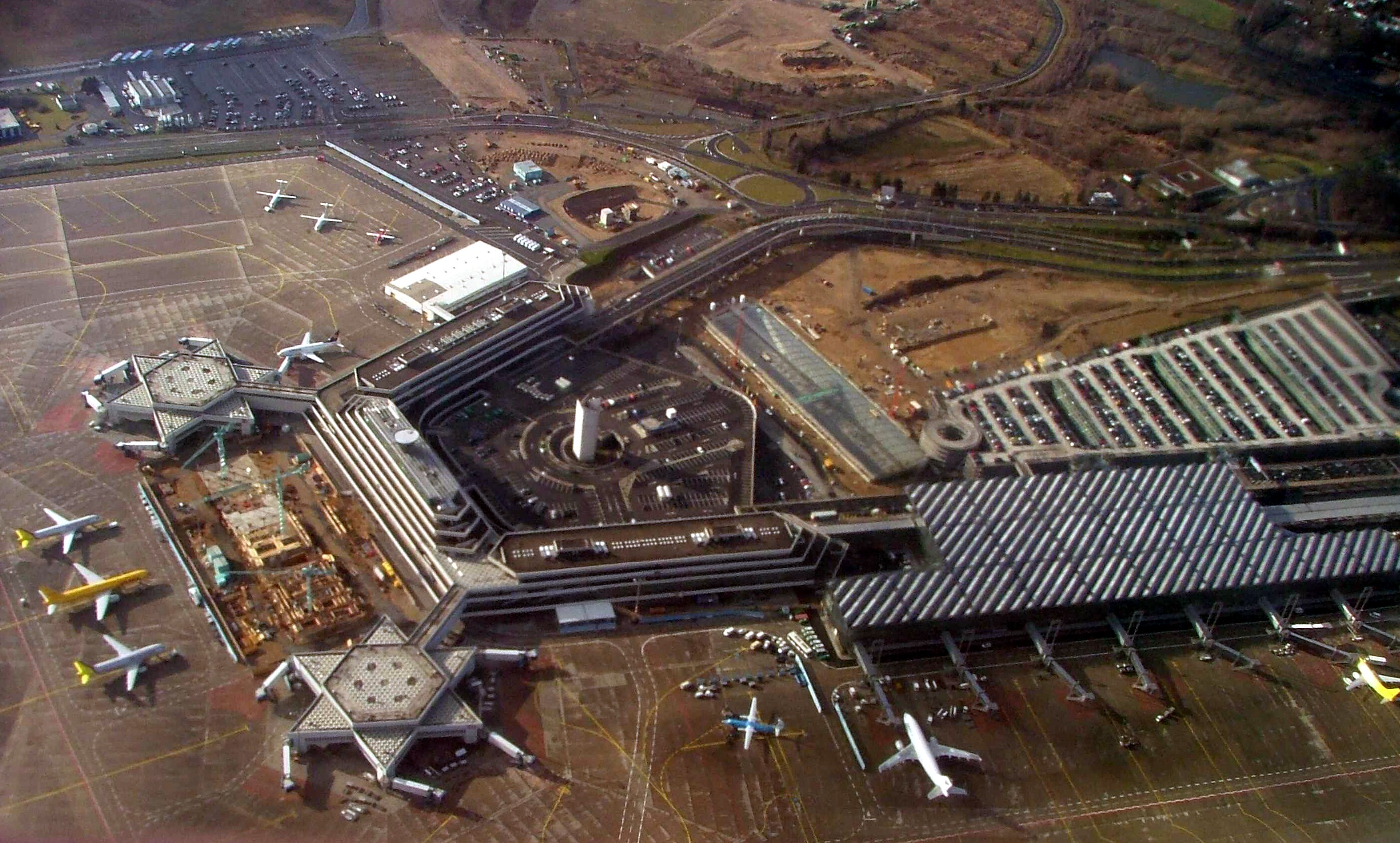
Terminal 1 (on the left) and the connecting hall between both main piers still under construction and Terminal 2 (on the right)

	Passengers	Movements	Freight (in t)
2000	6,291,739	138,434	423,641
2001	▼5,705,819	▼134,950	▲443,040
2002	▼5,375,126	▼125,307	▲494,331
2003	▲7,758,655	▲139,872	▲518,493
2004	▲8,332,961	▼136,927	▲605,069
2005	▲9,452,185	▲140,775	▲636,887
2006	▲9,904,236	▼139,096	▲685,563
2007	▲10,471,657	▼138,837	▲704,649
2008	▼10,342,931	▼128,713	▼578,161
2009	▼9,739,581	▼120,675	▼552,363
2010	▲9,849,779	▲121,011	▲656,120
2011	▼9,623,398	▼117,715	▲742,372
2012	▼9,280,070	▲125,335	▲751,183
2013	▼9,077,346	▼120,385	▼739,569
2014	▲9,450,493	▲123,241	▲754,356
2015	▲10,338,375	▲128,616	▲757,717
2016	▲11,910,138	▲136,905	▲786,407
2017	▲12,384,223	▲141,338	▲838,526
2018	▲12,945,341	▲144,204	▲859,396
2019	▼12,368,519	▼142,486	▼814,573
2020	▼3,081,159	▼78,867	▲863,410
2021	▲4,253,568	▲79,214	▲985,754
2022	▲8,756,712	▲120,975	▼971,442
2023	▲9,763,127	▼118,191	▼871,537
2024	▲10,012,447	▼117,345	▼845,629
2025	▲10,044,359	▼116,028	▼842,377
^{Source: ADV German Airports Association}

== Ground transportation ==
=== Train ===
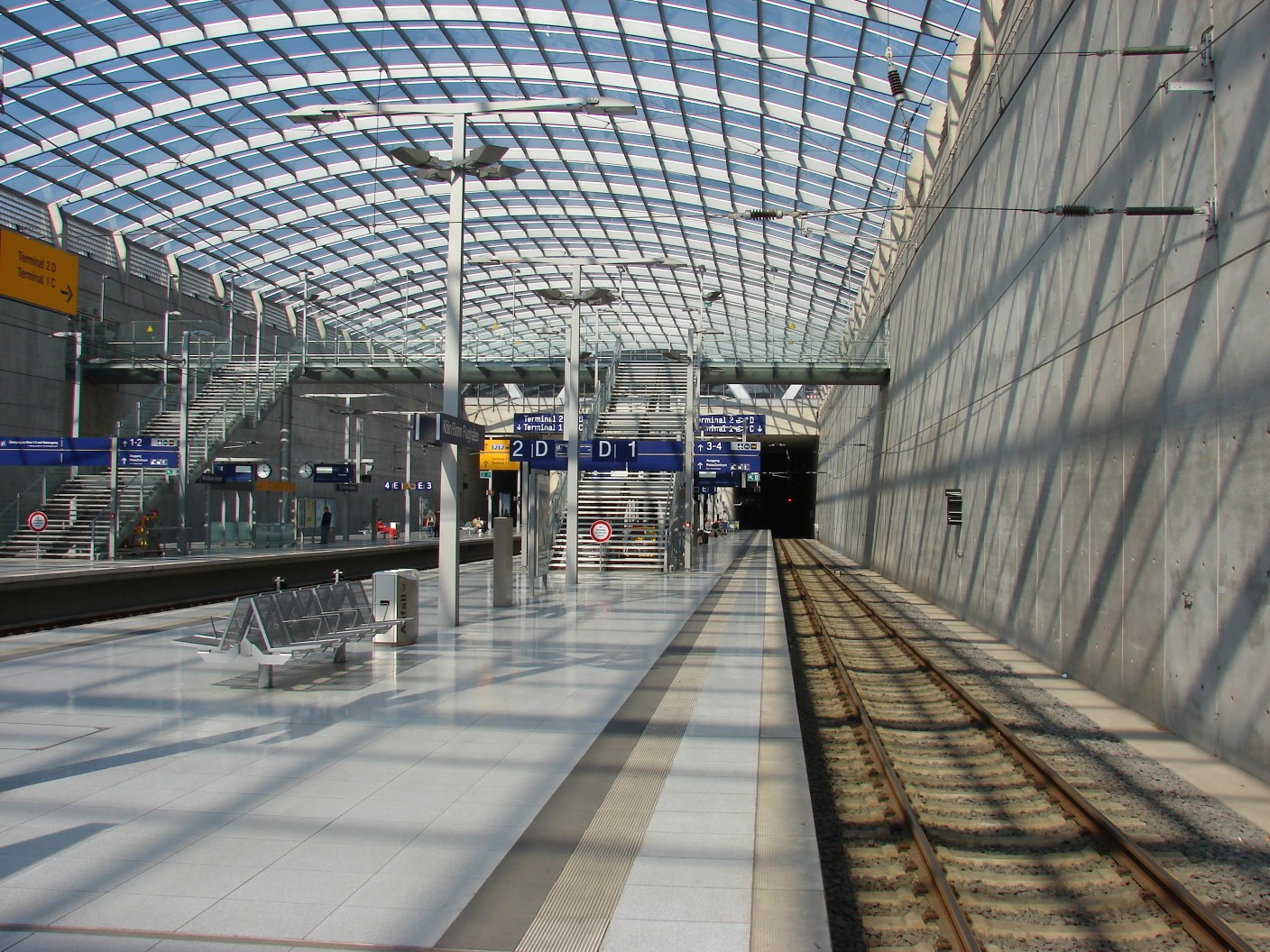
The platforms at Cologne/Bonn Airport station

Cologne/Bonn Airport station is a four-track railway station on a loop off the Cologne–Frankfurt high-speed line that connects Cologne Bonn Airport to long-distance trains at least once an hour per direction, most of them ICE services. The station lies directly across both terminals under a large glass roof and features direct connections to the basement of Terminal 2 as well as the check-in area at Terminal 1-C. The S-Bahn line S 19 to Düren and regional train line RE 6 to Minden (Westfalen) connects the airport station with via Cologne Main Station. RB 27 between Mönchengladbach and Koblenz calls at the airport station as well.

=== Car ===
The airport has its own exit (named Flughafen) on motorway A59 which links it to the city centres of Cologne and Bonn as well as the Ruhrgebiet.

=== Bus ===
Local bus lines also connect the airport with Cologne (route 161) and Bonn (route SB60). On 28 October 2015, a new coach terminal opened and is used for remote bus services to other German cities and many other European countries.

== Accidents and incidents ==
- On April 4, 1978, a Spantax Convair 990 landing at Cologne Bonn Airport forgot to pull out the landing gear and the aircraft slid over the runway, resulting in the right wing catching fire. Two fire-fighting vehicles from the airport fire service that happened to be in the immediate vicinity probably prevented casualties in this accident. All 146 people on board escaped unharmed.
- On June 7, 1993, a Learjet 35A operated by Aero-Dienst crashed following a left engine failure at or near V2. The aircraft rolled to the left, contacted the ground beside the runway, levelled off, took off again and rolled left and inverted and impacted the ground. All four occupants were killed. Cause undetermined.

== See also ==
- Transport in Germany
- List of airports in Germany
