= Sivas Airport =

Sivas Nuri Demirağ Airport Sivas Nuri Demirağ Havalimanı
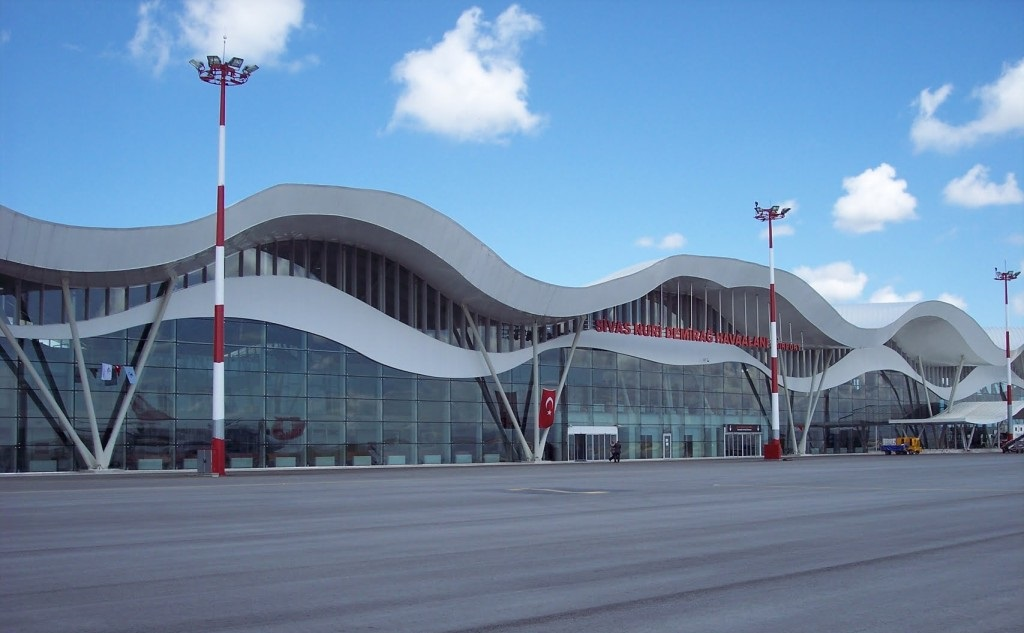
- IATA: VAS; ICAO: LTAR

Summary
- Airport type: Public
- Operator: General Directorate of State Airports Authority
- Serves: Sivas, Turkey
- Location: Sivas, Turkey
- Opened: 1957; 69 years ago
- Elevation AMSL: 5,222 ft (1,592 m)
- Coordinates: 39°48′06.7″N 036°53′36.1″E
- Website: www.dhmi.gov.tr

Map
- Location of the airport in Turkey

Runways
Direction	Length		Surface
Direction	ft	m	Surface
01/19	12,500	3,810	Asphalt

Statistics (2025)
- Annual passenger capacity: 3,000,000
- Passengers: 502,630
- Passenger change 2024–25: ▲18%
- Aircraft movements: 1,160
- Movements change 2024–25: ▲22%

Sivas Nuri Demirağ Airportt (IATA: VAS, ICAO: LTAR) is an airport located 22 kilometres (14 mi) northwest of Sivas, Turkey.

== Overview ==
The airport was opened to air traffic in 1957 to be used for military purposes; in 1990, DHMİ (State Airports Authority) built a 2,217-square-metre (23,860 sq ft) terminal building to begin to serve the civilian air traffic.

Sivas Nuri Demirağ Airport closed air traffic with decision of cabinet on 31 January 2002, and opened air traffic with decision of cabinet on 17 October 2003. The airport was closed again to air traffic on 15 April 2006 due to the repair of the runway and expansion work, and 01/19 width of the runway has been removed from 30 meters to 45 meters. After special lighting and asphalt work completed, runway 19/01 is the-second longest runway in Turkey with 3,811 by 45 metres (12,503 ft × 148 ft). The new apron, five aircraft capacity and 120 by 240 metres (390 ft × 790 ft) in size and runway taxiway connection was put into service on 22 December 2006. The new terminal building opened for use on 18 December 2010 with an annual capacity of 3 million passengers. The original terminal building meets the standards of today's airport was built as an architecture with a modern facility.

== Airlines and destinations ==
The following airlines operate regular scheduled and charter flights at Sivas Airport:

Airlines	Destinations
AJet	Istanbul–Sabiha Gökcen; Seasonal: Cologne/Bonn
Pegasus Airlines	Istanbul–Sabiha Gökcen, Izmir
SunExpress	Izmir
Turkish Airlines	Istanbul

== Traffic statistics ==
Sivas–Nuri Demirağ Airport passenger traffic statistics
Year (months)	Domestic	% change	International	% change	Total	% change
2025	492,976	▲18%	9,654	▲70%	502,630	▲18%
2024	418,935	▼1%	5,665	▲20%	424,600	▼1%
2023	422,875	▲16%	4,733	▲103%	427,608	▲17%
2022	364,711	▼10%	2,326	▼40%	367,037	▼11%
2021	406,563	▲37%	3,874	▼13%	410,437	▲36%
2020	296,451	▼39%	4,430	▼1%	300,881	▼39%
2019	486,840	▼15%	4,468	▼35%	491,308	▼15%
2018	574,523	▲2%	6,844	▲0%	581,367	▲2%
2017	560,867	▲1%	6,822	▲20%	567,689	▲1%
2016	556,474	▲6%	5,685	▼9%	562,159	▲6%
2015	524,666	▲26%	6,275	▼12%	530,941	▲26%
2014	415,451	▲25%	7,105	▲2%	422,556	▲25%
2013	331,771	▲40%	6,959	▲1%	338,730	▲39%
2012	237,120	▲7%	6,890	▼9%	244,010	▲7%
2011	221,049	▲106%	7,550	▲85%	228,599	▲105%
2010	107,386	▼12%	4,071	▲106%	111,457	▼10%
2009	122,158	▲6%	1,979	▼79%	124,137	▼0%
2008	114,855	▲17%	9,502	▲141%	124,357	▲22%
2007	98,010	Steady	3,949	Steady	101,959	Steady
