= Ağrı Airport =

Ağrı Ahmed-i Hani Airport Ağrı Ahmed-i Hani Havalimanı Ağrı Havalimanı
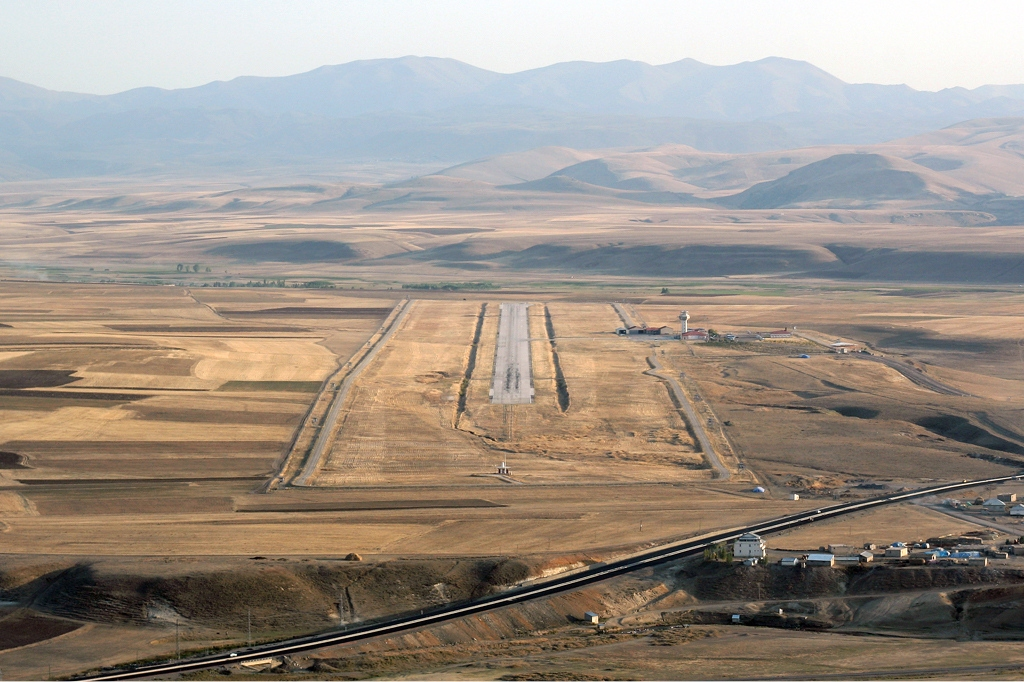
- IATA: AJI; ICAO: LTCO

Summary
- Airport type: Public
- Operator: General Directorate of State Airports Authority
- Serves: Ağrı, Turkey
- Location: Ağrı, Turkey
- Opened: 8 January 1997; 29 years ago
- Elevation AMSL: 5,462 ft / 1,665 m
- Coordinates: 39°39′16″N 43°01′38″E
- Website: www.dhmi.gov.tr

Map
- Location of airport in Turkey AJI (Europe)

Runways
Direction	Length		Surface
Direction	ft	m	Surface
16/34	9,842	3,000	Asphalt

Statistics (2025)
- Annual passenger capacity: 2,500,000
- Passengers: 396,411
- Passenger change 2024–25: ▲27%
- Aircraft movements: 2,602
- Movements change 2024–25: ▲26%

Ağrı Ahmed-i Hani Airport (IATA: AJI, ICAO: LTCO) is an airport in Ağrı, in eastern Turkey. The airport is situated about 8 km (5.0 mi) south of Ağrı's city center.

== Overview ==
The airport was opened on 8 January 1998 as Ağrı Airport. It was temporarily closed down in 2009 to widen and upgrade the apron and runway, which was completed in 2011. In 2015, a new terminal building was completed and the airport's name was changed to Ağrı Ahmed-i Hani Airport.

== Airlines and destinations ==
The following airlines operate regular scheduled and charter flights at Ağrı Airport:

Airlines	Destinations
AJet	Ankara, Istanbul–Sabiha Gökçen
Pegasus Airlines	İzmir
Turkish Airlines	Istanbul

== Traffic statistics ==
Ağrı–Ahmed-i Hani Airport passenger traffic statistics
Year (months)	Domestic	% change	International	% change	Total	% change
2025	395,285	▲27%	1,126	▼43%	396,411	▲27%
2024	310,326	▼1%	1,979	▼53%	312,305	▼2%
2023	313,337	▲43%	4,200	▲30%	317,537	▲43%
2022	218,931	▼13%	3,239	-	222,170	▼11%
2021	250,600	▲20%	-	▼100%	250,600	▲20%
2020	208,620	▼35%	367	-	208,987	▼35%
2019	321,758	▼1%	-	▼100%	321,758	▼2%
2018	325,813	▲15%	907	▲161%	326,720	▲15%
2017	283,273	▲20%	347	-	283,620	▲20%
2016	235,770	▲11%	-	-	235,770	▲11%
2015	211,723	▲5%	-	-	211,723	▲5%
2014	201,140	▲11%	-	-	201,140	▲11%
2013	181,921	▲18%	-	-	181,921	▲18%
2012	154,035	▲15%	-	-	154,035	▲15%
2011	134,519	-	-	-	134,519	-
2010	-	▼100%	-	-	-	▼100%
2009	14,169	▼77%	-	-	14,169	▼77%
2008	60,360	▲42%	-	-	60,360	▲42%
2007	42,621	Steady	-	Steady	42,621	Steady

== Ground transport ==
The D.965 connects the airport to Ağrı.
