= Turkish Airlines Flight 158 =

Aircraft involved in 1983 landing accident

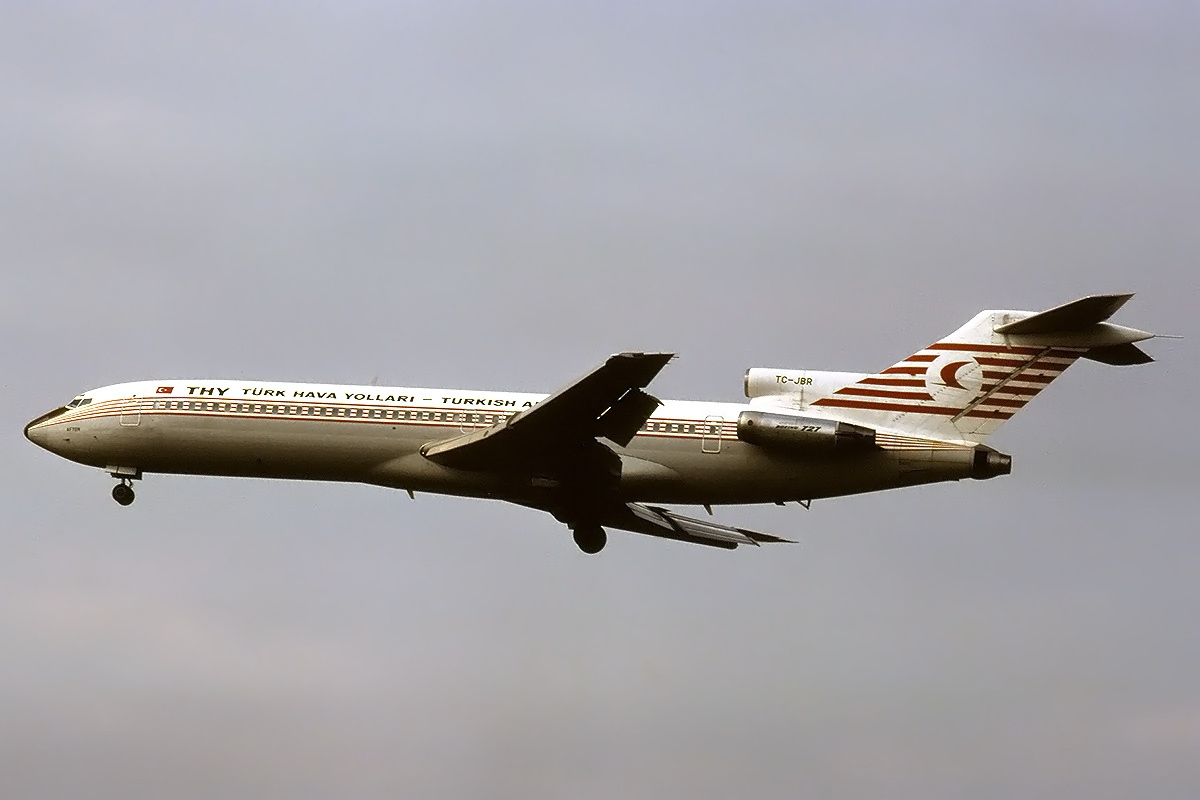
- The aircraft involved in the accident, 1981.

Accident
- Date: 16 January 1983
- Summary: Runway undershot in bad weather conditions
- Site: near Ankara Esenboğa Airport, Turkey; 40°06′46.8″N 32°58′48″E

Aircraft
- Aircraft type: Boeing 727-2F2
- Aircraft name: Afyon
- Operator: Turkish Airlines
- IATA flight No.: TK158
- ICAO flight No.: THY158
- Call sign: TURKISH 158
- Registration: TC-JBR
- Flight origin: Orly Airport, Paris, France
- Stopover: Istanbul Yeşilköy Airport, Turkey
- Destination: Ankara Esenboğa Airport, Turkey
- Occupants: 67
- Passengers: 60
- Crew: 7
- Fatalities: 47
- Injuries: 20
- Survivors: 20

Turkish Airlines Flight 158 was a scheduled domestic passenger flight from Istanbul Yeşilköy Airport to Ankara Esenboğa Airport, Turkey. On 16 January 1983, the aircraft operating the flight, a Boeing 727-200, landed about 50 metres (160 ft) short of the runway at its destination airport in driving snow, broke up, and caught fire. Of the 67 occupants on board, 47 died.

== Accident ==
The flight was a scheduled flight between Paris and Ankara Esenboğa Airport in Turkey, with a scheduled stop at Istanbul Yeşilköy Airport. As the Boeing 727 approached the airport in Ankara, weather conditions were bad, with driving snow and gusty winds. As the plane attempted to land, it hit the ground well short of the runway. It then struck an obstacle and broken into three pieces as it skidded onto the runway. The middle section of the plane exploded and burst into flames.

The weather conditions hindered rescue attempts, as the roads were treacherous. Four taxis that were rushing to the airport to assist with the rescue efforts collided, killing four people. Many of the dead and injured were burned in the fire. Area hospitals had difficulty identifying the badly burned bodies. Some of the survivors had been seated in the tail section of the aircraft and were thrown from the aircraft when it broke apart. Most of the fatal injuries occurred to passengers in the middle section that caught on fire.

After the crash, Esenboğa Airport was closed until the following afternoon to give investigators a chance to locate the flight recorders and to inspect the wreckage.

== Aircraft ==
The aircraft, a Boeing 727-2F2 with three Pratt & Whitney JT8D-15 turbofan jet engines, was built by Boeing with manufacturer serial number 21603/1389, and made its first flight in 1978.

== Crew and passengers ==
The aircraft had 7 crew and 60 passengers on board. 47 passengers were killed. All members of the crew and 13 of the passengers were injured, but survived the accident. Many of the dead and injured were burned in the fire. 21 of the passengers were on connecting flights from Paris, Copenhagen, and Munich.
