= Elazığ Airport =

Elazığ Airport Elazığ Havalimanı
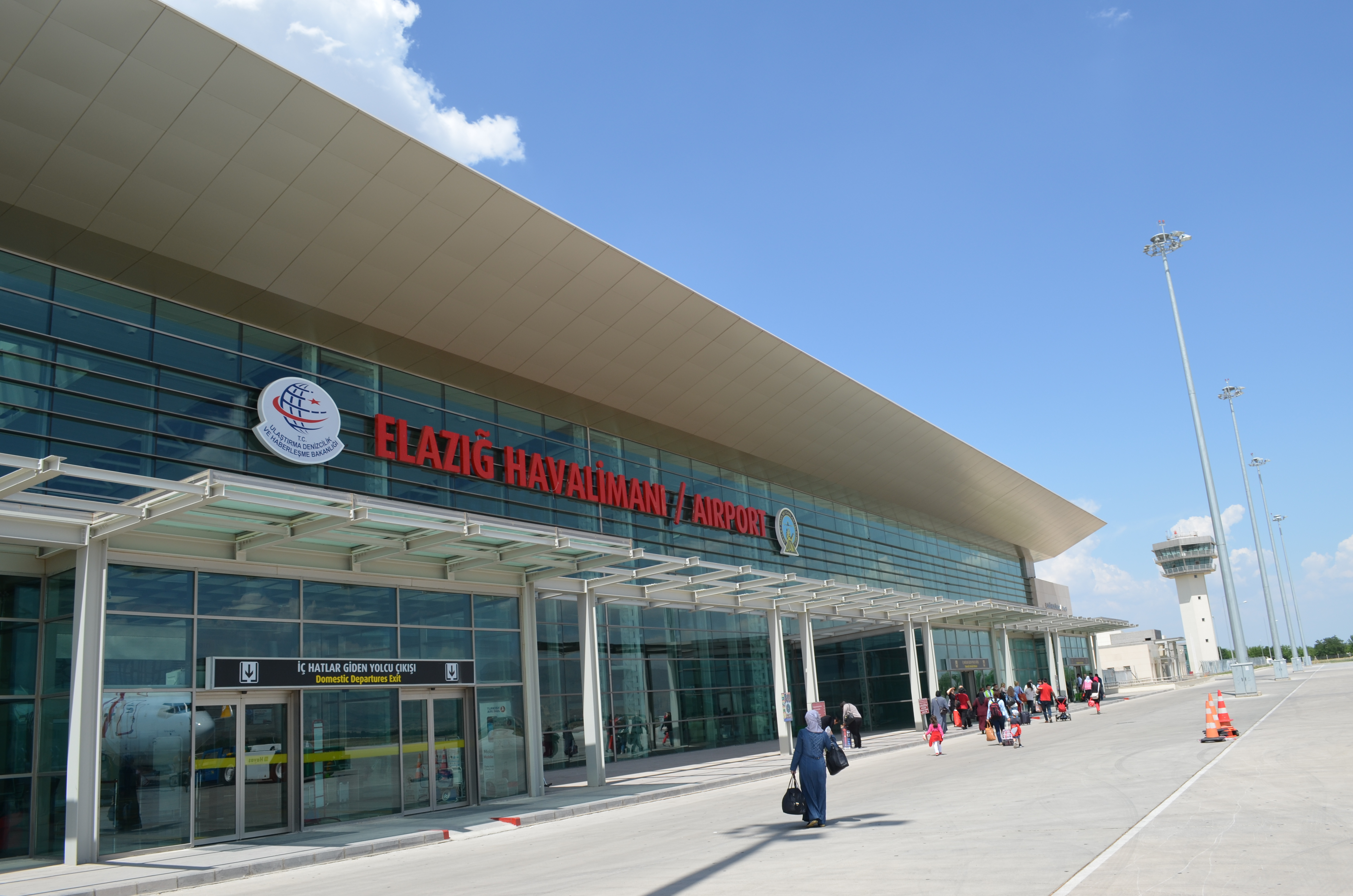
- IATA: EZS; ICAO: LTCA

Summary
- Airport type: Public / Military
- Operator: DHMI
- Serves: Elazığ, Turkey
- Location: Elazığ, Turkey
- Opened: 1940; 86 years ago
- Elevation AMSL: 2,927 ft (892 m)
- Coordinates: 38°36′24″N 039°17′29″E
- Website: elazig.dhmi.gov.tr

Map
- Location of airport in Turkey

Runways
Direction	Length		Surface
Direction	m	ft	Surface
07/25	3,000	9,843	Asphalt

Statistics (2025)
- Annual passenger capacity: 2,500,000
- Passengers: 1,104,710
- Passenger change 2024–25: ▲14%
- Aircraft movements: 9,312
- Movements change 2024–25: ▲10%

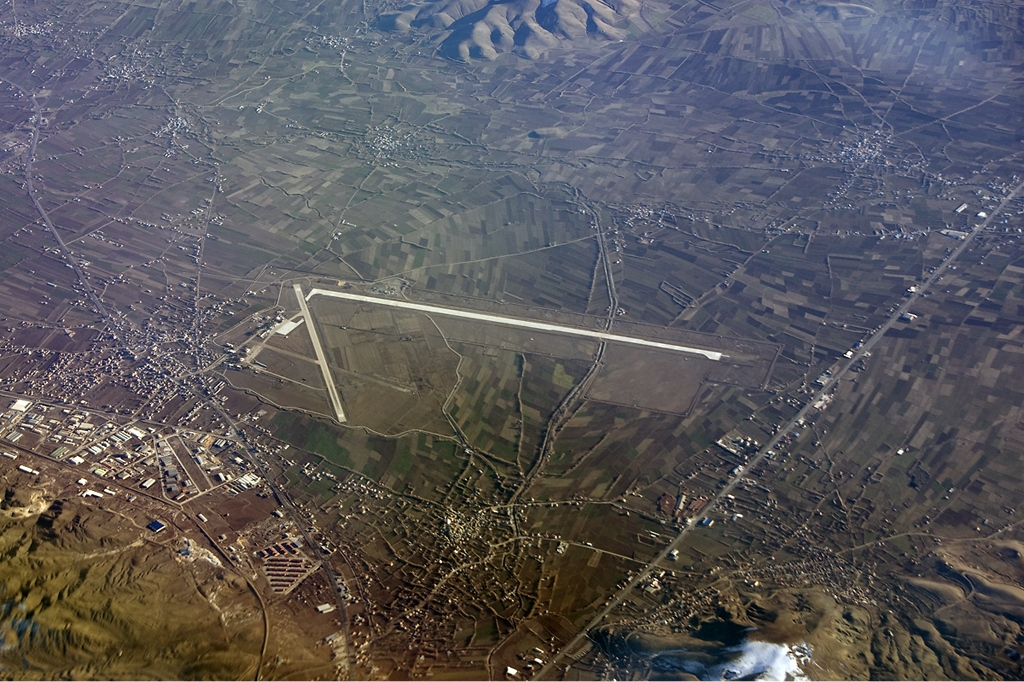
Aerial view of the airport.

Elazığ Airport (IATA: EZS, ICAO: LTCA) is an airport in Elazığ, Turkey. First opened to air traffic in 1940, Elazığ Airport is one of the oldest airports still in use in Turkey. The old runway 09/27 has been closed and replaced by the new 13/31 runway that was completed in 2021. A new terminal building and runway was also built in 2012. The old terminal and runway are now used by the Turkish Armed Forces.

== Airlines and destinations ==
The following airlines operate regular scheduled and charter flights at Elazığ Airport:

Airlines	Destinations
AJet	Ankara, Istanbul–Sabiha Gökçen
Pegasus Airlines	Antalya, Istanbul–Sabiha Gökçen, İzmir; Seasonal: Cologne/Bonn
SunExpress	İzmir; Seasonal: Cologne/Bonn Düsseldorf, Frankfurt, Hannover, Stuttgart
Turkish Airlines	Istanbul; Seasonal: Frankfurt

== Traffic Statistics ==
Elazığ Airport Passenger Traffic Statistics
Year (months)	Domestic	% change	International	% change	Total	% change
2025	1,020,481	▲14%	84,229	▲8%	1,104,710	▲14%
2024	894,520	▲5%	77,775	▲11%	972,295	▲6%
2023	850,652	▲37%	70,037	▲17%	920,689	▲35%
2022	622,211	▲20%	59,813	▲42%	682,024	▲22%
2021	516,968	▼0%	42,268	▲82%	559,236	▲3%
2020	518,548	▼40%	23,279	▼43%	541,827	▼40%
2019	861,357	▼14%	41,145	▲13%	902,502	▼13%
2018	1,002,767	▲9%	36,411	▲25%	1,039,178	▲1%
2017	1,001,374	▲1%	29,138	▲4%	1,030,512	▲1%
2016	995,980	▲7%	28,075	▼3%	1,024,055	▲7%
2015	929,329	▲8%	28,840	▼18%	958,169	▲7%
2014	859,823	▲7%	35,379	▲10%	895,202	▲7%
2013	805,062	▲25%	32,293	▼16%	837,355	▲23%
2012	642,819	▲25%	38,598	▲9%	681,417	▲24%
2011	513,804	▲16%	35,250	▲37%	549,054	▲17%
2010	444,391	▲29%	25,658	▲1615%	470,049	▲36%
2009	343,348	▲154%	1,496	-	344,844	▲155%
2008	135,293	▲13%	-	-	135,293	▲13%
2007	119,877	Steady	-	Steady	119,877	Steady
