= Ankara Esenboğa Airport =

Airport in Ankara, Turkey

Ankara Esenboğa Airport Ankara Esenboğa Havalimanı

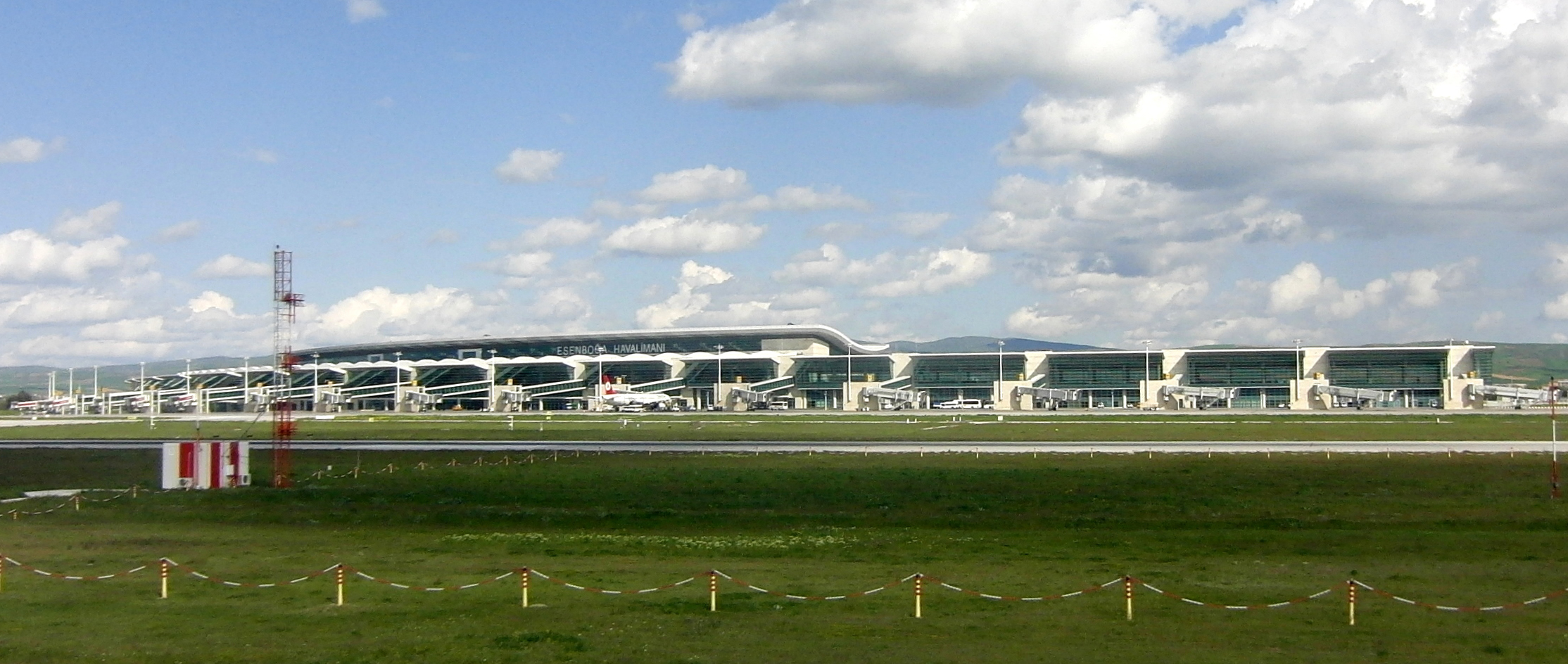
- IATA: ESB; ICAO: LTAC

Summary
- Airport type: Public
- Owner: General Directorate of State Airports (DHMİ)
- Operator: TAV Airports Holding
- Serves: Ankara and Kırıkkale, Turkey
- Location: Çubuk, Ankara, Turkey
- Opened: 1955; 71 years ago
- Hub for: AJet; Corendon Airlines; Pegasus Airlines; SunExpress; Turkish Airlines
- Elevation AMSL: 3,125 ft (952 m)
- Coordinates: 40°07′41″N 032°59′42″E
- Website: www.esenbogaairport.com

Map
- Location within Turkey

Runways
Direction	Length		Surface
Direction	m	ft	Surface
03C/21C	3,750	12,303	Asphalt
03L/21R	3,400	11,125	Asphalt
03R/21L			Asphalt

Statistics (2025)
- Annual passenger capacity: 30,000,000
- Passengers: 13,926,680
- Passenger change 2024–25: ▲8%
- Aircraft movements: 103,318
- Movements change 2024–25: ▲7%
- Source: Turkish AIP at EUROCONTROL; Passenger Traffic, ACI Europe

Ankara Esenboğa Airport (IATA: ESB, ICAO: LTAC) is an international airport of Ankara, the capital city of Turkey. In 2025, the airport served more than 13 million passengers, 10 million of which were domestic passengers. It ranked 4th in terms of total passenger traffic (after Istanbul Airport, Sabiha Gökçen Airport and Antalya Airport), 3rd in terms of domestic passenger traffic (after Istanbul Airport and Sabiha Gökçen Airport) among airports in Turkey as well as being the 13th busiest airport in the Middle East.

== Overview ==
The airport is located northeast of Ankara, 28 km (17 mi) from the city center.

The name of the airport comes from the village of Esenboğa, which literally means "Windflowing Bull" or "Serene Bull", the modernized form of Isen Buqa, the name of a Turkic warlord in the army of Timur who settled his troops here during the Battle of Ankara in 1402.

Esenboğa International Airport was awarded the best airport in Europe by ACI Europe (Airport Council International), the award was presented to airport officials on 17 June 2009 in Manchester. The award is given in 4 categories every year and Esenboğa was in the 5–10 million per annum category. It is the first time an ACI award was granted to a Turkish Airport. According to ACI-Europe, "As with number of the top candidates in this category, the airport excels in all the keys areas of operations, however the judges singled it out for its work in the area of environmental innovation, securing an incredible 25% energy savings stemming from its recycling of exhaust gases to power its air conditioning plants." In 2020, Esenboğa Airport was awarded as the best European airport with a capacity of 15 – 25 million passengers by Airports Council International.

A new parallel runway is under construction to the east of the terminal building. Upon completion, the current runway 03R/21L will be resigned as 03C/21C and the new runway will receive the latter's former designation.

== Terminals ==
Esenboga Airport Domestic and International Terminal was constructed under the "Build-Operate-Transfer" model. The current Terminal, which went into operation on 16 October 2006, had a capacity of 10 million passengers, with 182,000 square metres (1,960,000 sq ft). A new general aviation terminal of 469 m^{2} (5,048 sq ft) was opened in January 2012 to service private aircraft.

The new terminal, opened in 2006, is 168,000 m^{2} (1,808,337 sq ft) in area, with a 10,000,000 per year passenger capacity, 18 air bridges, 105 check-in counters, 34 passport counters, a parking facility of 123,000 m^{2} (1,323,961 sq ft) with a 4,000 vehicles capacity.

== Airlines and destinations ==
The following airlines operate regular scheduled and charter flights at Ankara Esenboğa Airport:

Airlines	Destinations
AJet	Adana/Mersin, Adıyaman, Ağrı, Almaty, Amman–Queen Alia, Amsterdam, Antalya, Astana, Baghdad, Baku, Barcelona, Batman, Beirut, Belgrade, Berlin, Bingöl, Bishkek, Bodrum, Bursa, Bucharest–Otopeni, Cairo, Çanakkale, Dalaman, Damascus, Diyarbakır, Dubai–International, Düsseldorf, Edremit, Elazığ, Erbil, Ercan, Erzincan, Erzurum, Frankfurt, Gaziantep, Gazipaşa/Alanya, Hakkari, Hatay, Iğdır, Istanbul–Sabiha Gökçen, İzmir, Jeddah, Kahramanmaraş, Kars, London–Stansted, Madrid, Malatya, Mardin, Medina, Moscow–Vnukovo, Muş, Ordu/Giresun, Paris–Charles de Gaulle, Rize/Artvin, Saint Petersburg, Sarajevo, Samsun, Siirt, Skopje, Şanlıurfa, Şırnak, Tashkent, Tbilisi, Tirana, Tokat, Trabzon, Van, Vienna; Seasonal: Brussels, Cologne/Bonn, Geneva, Hamburg, Munich, Stockholm–Arlanda, Stuttgart
Ariana Afghan Airlines	Kabul
Azerbaijan Airlines	Baku
Corendon Airlines	Seasonal: Cologne/Bonn, Düsseldorf, Nuremberg
FlyArystan	Astana
Fly Baghdad	Baghdad, Erbil
Flydubai	Dubai–International
Fly Kıbrıs Airlines	Ercan
Iraqi Airways	Baghdad, Erbil, Kirkuk
Kam Air	Kabul
Pegasus Airlines	Almaty, Amman–Queen Alia, Antalya, Baku, Bodrum, Bucharest–Otopeni, Cologne/Bonn, Çorlu, Dalaman, Dubai–International, Düsseldorf, Erbil, Ercan, Frankfurt, Hamburg, Istanbul–Sabiha Gökçen, İzmir, Jeddah, Kraków, London–Stansted, Medina, Sharjah, Stockholm–Arlanda, Stuttgart, Tbilisi, Vienna, Warsaw–Chopin; Seasonal: Basel/Mulhouse, Berlin, Copenhagen, Lisbon, Moscow–Domodedovo
Qatar Airways	Doha
Saudia	Jeddah, Medina
SunExpress	Düsseldorf, Frankfurt, Hannover, Munich; Seasonal: Amsterdam, Berlin, Brussels, Cologne/Bonn, Copenhagen, Hamburg, Rotterdam/The Hague, Stockholm–Arlanda, Stuttgart, Tbilisi, Vienna, Zürich
Transavia	Paris–Orly
Turkish Airlines	Istanbul
UR Airlines	Baghdad
Uzbekistan Airways	Tashkent
Wizz Air	Budapest

== Statistics ==
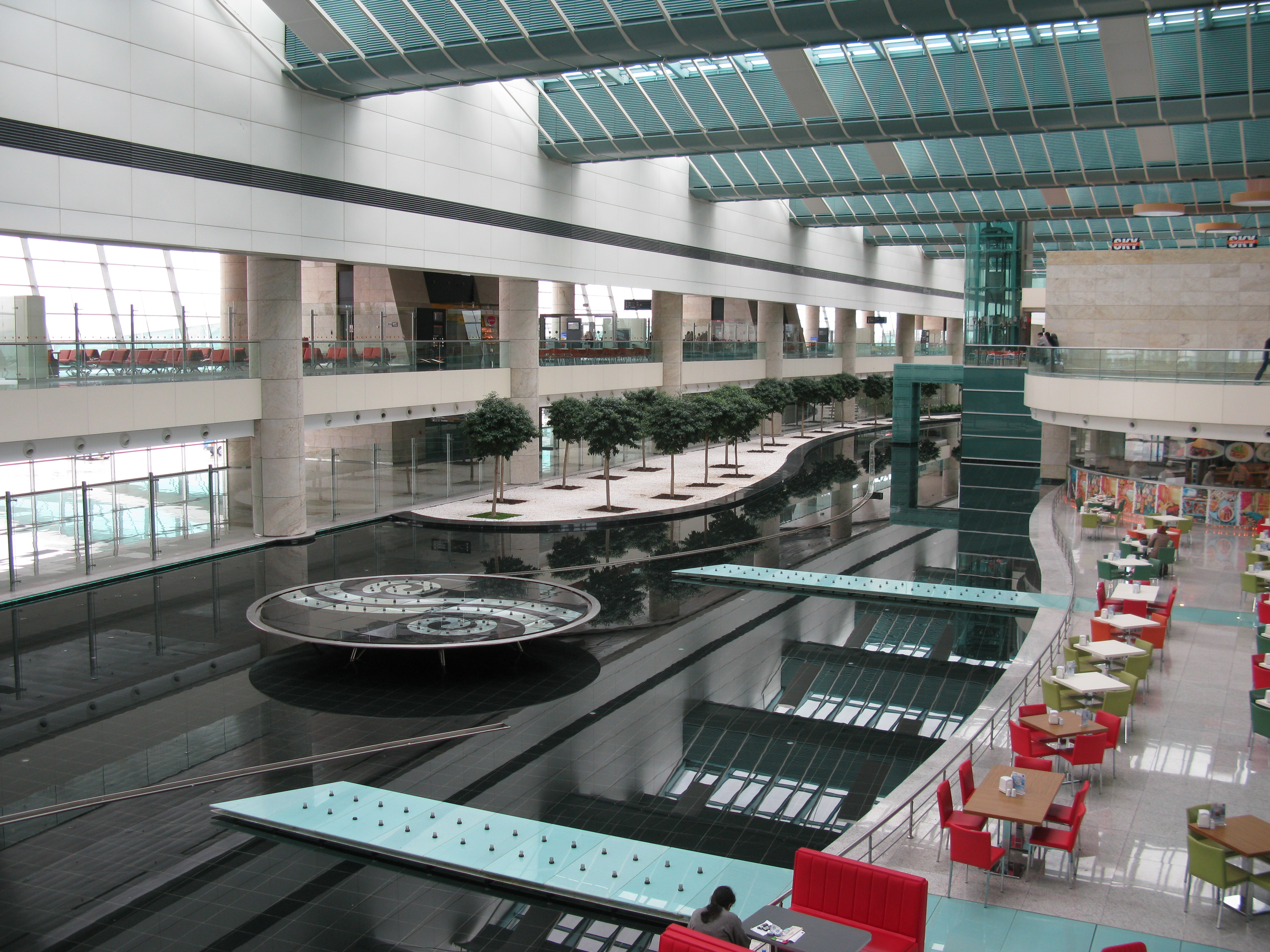
Interior view

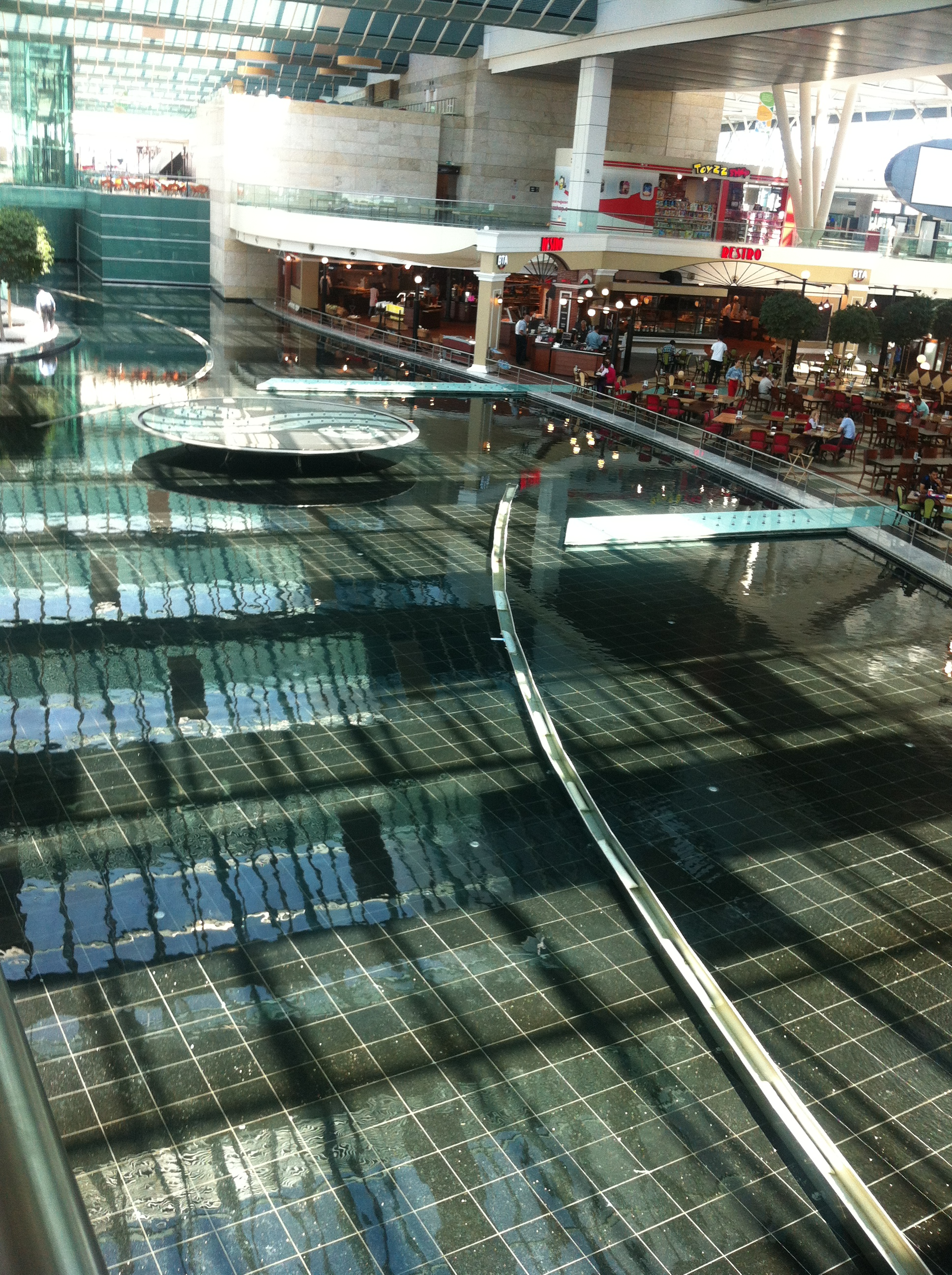
Interior view

=== Passengers ===
Ankara–Esenboğa International Airport Passenger Traffic Statistics
Year	Domestic	% change	International	% change	Total	% change
2025	10,318,983	▲6%	3,607,697	▲13%	13,926,680	▲8%
2024	9,719,730	▲7%	3,194,023	▲13%	12,913,753	▲8%
2023	9,123,505	▲35%	2,827,435	▲47%	11,950,940	▲38%
2022	6,756,212	▲18%	1,923,382	▲48%	8,679,594	▲23%
2021	5,728,315	▲30%	1,301,315	▲74%	7,029,630	▲36%
2020	4,415,805	▼61%	746,764	▼67%	5,162,569	▼62%
2019	11,463,200	▼21%	2,277,395	▲2%	13,740,595	▼18%
2018	14,498,102	▲5%	2,241,901	▲13%	16,740,003	▲6%
2017	13,828,365	▲20%	1,988,793	▲33%	15,817,158	▲21%
2016	11,547,240	▲9%	1,496,876	▼3%	13,044,116	▲8%
2015	10,562,282	▲10%	1,551,157	▲7%	12,113,439	▲10%
2014	9,591,350	▲2%	1,444,256	▼8%	11,035,606	▲1%
2013	9,369,832	▲22%	1,572,228	▼1%	10,942,060	▲18%
2012	7,679,371	▲8%	1,593,737	▲13%	9,273,108	▲9%
2011	7,080,072	▲10%	1,405,395	▲6%	8,485,467	▲9%
2010	6,435,211	▲29%	1,328,693	▲21%	7,763,914	▲28%
2009	4,990,134	▲12%	1,094,270	▼12%	6,084,404	▲7%
2008	4,444,311	▲23%	1,247,822	▼8%	5,692,133	▲15%
2007	3,609,122	▲10%	1,349,006	▲7%	4,958,128	▲9%
2006	3,287,585	▲25%	1,259,993	▲6%	4,547,578	▲19%
2005	2,640,604	▲23%	1,189,250	▲5%	3,829,854	▲17%
2004	2,141,047	▲21%	1,134,678	▲12%	3,275,725	▲18%
2003	1,773,531	▼2%	1,010,396	▼1%	2,783,927	▼2%
2002	1,814,563	▼14%	1,022,065	▼3%	2,836,628	▼10%
2001	2,107,013	▼25%	1,052,302	▼14%	3,159,315	▼22%
2000	2,800,943	Steady	1,226,985	Steady	4,027,928	Steady

=== Movements ===
Ankara Esenboğa International Airport aircraft movement statistics
Year	Domestic	% change	International	% change	Total	% change
2025	74,378	▲4%	28,940	▲14%	103,318	▲7%
2024	71,470	▲2%	25,440	▲9%	96,910	▲4%
2023	69,762	▲29%	23,312	▲34%	93,074	▲30%
2022	53,926	▲2%	17,429	▲23%	71,355	▲7%
2021	52,753	▲28%	14,160	▲56%	66,913	▲33%
2020	41,321	▼48%	9,073	▼55%	50,394	▼49%
2019	78,871	▼21%	20,371	▲4%	99,242	▼17%
2018	100,258	▲1%	19,513	▲6%	119,771	▲2%
2017	99,384	▲11%	18,453	▲14%	117,837	▲12%
2016	89,458	▲8%	16,152	▲3%	105,610	▲7%
2015	82,852	▲5%	15,758	▲0%	98,610	▲4%
2014	78,712	▼2%	15,706	▼6%	94,418	▼2%
2013	80,107	▲16%	16,711	▲1%	96,818	▲13%
2012	69,335	▲3%	16,548	▲7%	85,883	▲4%
2011	67,513	▲13%	15,452	▲7%	82,965	▲12%
2010	59,509	▲18%	14,420	▲17%	73,929	▲18%
2009	50,347	▲4%	12,273	▼15%	62,620	▼0%
2008	48,463	▲2%	14,396	▼12%	62,859	▼2%
2007	47,578	Steady	16,331	Steady	63,909	Steady

== Other facilities ==
- The airport used to be the head office of AnadoluJet.
- Esenboğa Airport was designated as one of the emergency landing sites for NASA's Space Shuttle.

== Ground transport ==
A metro line is planned for Ankara Esenboğa Airport. The new metro line will connect the airport and Yıldırım Beyazıt University to the city's central rail network. The line will be a fully automated metro system, running underground.

The airport is connected with Kızılay (the city center) and Ankara Intercity Bus Terminal (Turkish: Ankara Şehirlerarası Terminal İşletmesi, AŞTİ) by EGO city bus number 442 (from 6 am to 11pm). Transportation to the city center is also by taxi and through the Havaş bus line. The road between Esenboğa airport and the Ankara ring road was expanded during the summer of 2006, decreasing the driving time between the city center and the airport by several minutes.

== Accidents and incidents ==
- Scandinavian Airlines System Flight 871, a Sud Aviation SE-210 Caravelle I crashed on approach killing all 42 occupants on board.
- Turkish Airlines Flight 835, a Fokker F27 Friendship crashed into a hill shortly before landing killing 28 occupants out of the 29.
- British European Airways Flight 226, a de Havilland Comet 4B crashed shortly after takeoff due to stalling. Twenty-seven out of the 34 occupants were killed.
- 1979 Turkish Airlines Ankara crash, a Fokker F28 Fellowship crashed during approach killing 41 out of the 45 occupants on board.
- Turkish Airlines Flight 158, a Boeing 727-2F2 landed 50 m (160 ft) short of the runway resulting in the deaths of 47 occupants out of the 67.
- Harmony Jets Flight 185, a chartered Dassault Falcon 50, crashed after an unknown problem occurred during the climb to altitude, killing all on board.

== See also ==
- List of the busiest airports in the Middle East
- 2024 Russian prisoner exchange
