= Adıyaman Airport =

Adıyaman Airport Adıyaman Havalimanı
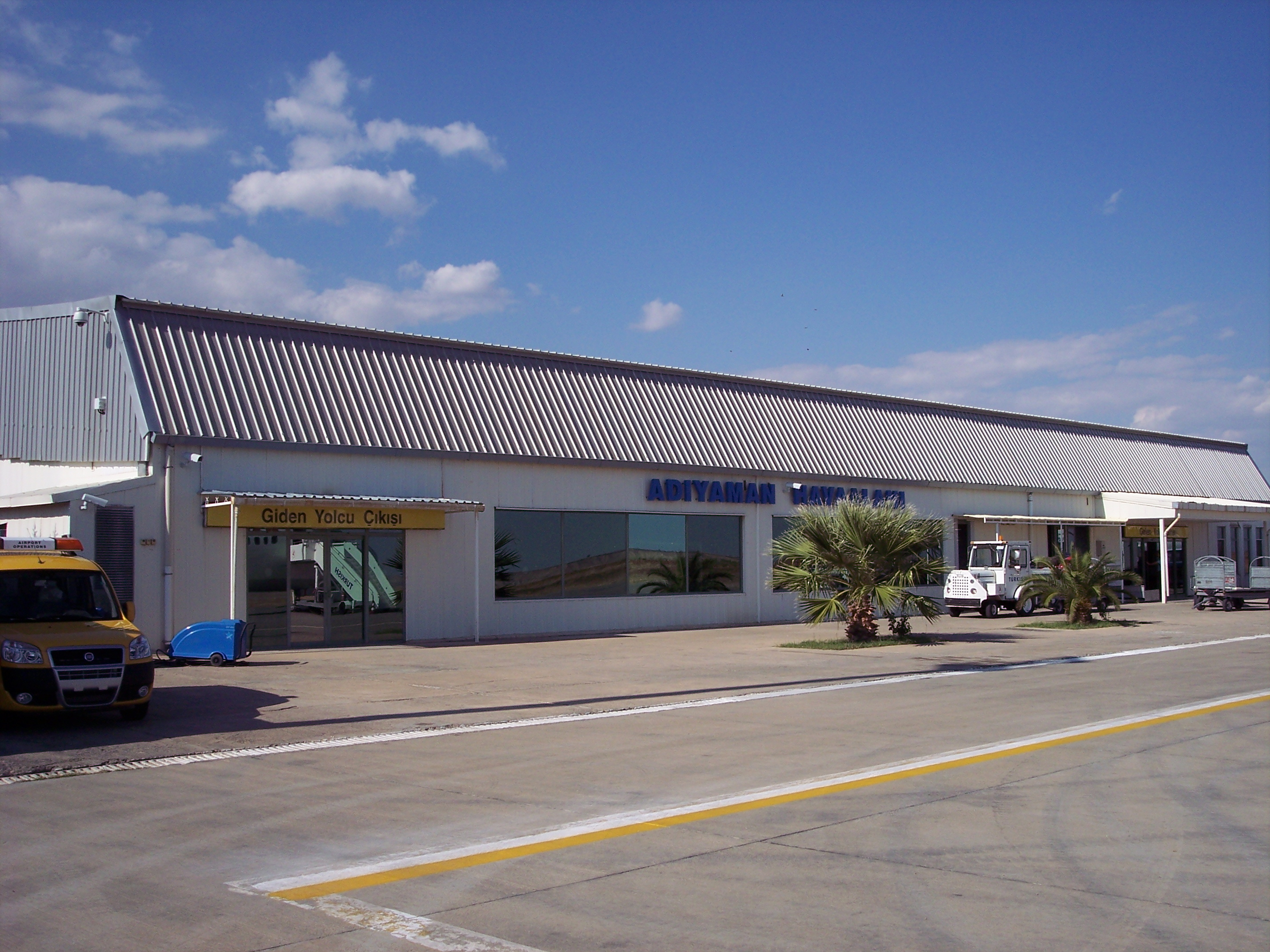
- IATA: ADF; ICAO: LTCP

Summary
- Airport type: Public
- Operator: General Directorate of State Airports Authority
- Serves: Adıyaman, Turkey
- Location: Adıyaman, Turkey
- Opened: 22 May 1998; 28 years ago
- Elevation AMSL: 2,216 ft / 675 m
- Coordinates: 37°43′54″N 38°28′08″E
- Website: www.dhmi.gov.tr

Map
- Location of airport in Turkey ADF (Europe)

Runways
Direction	Length		Surface
Direction	ft	m	Surface
05/23	8,212	2,500	Concrete

Statistics (2025)
- Annual passenger capacity: 2,500,000
- Passengers: 388,260
- Passenger change 2024–25: ▲6%
- Aircraft movements: 3,720
- Movements change 2024–25: ▲33%

Adıyaman Airport (IATA: ADF, ICAO: LTCP) is an airport located at Adıyaman, Adıyaman Province, Turkey.

== Airlines and destinations ==
The following airlines operate regular scheduled and charter flights at Adıyaman Airport:

Airlines	Destinations
AJet	Ankara, Istanbul–Sabiha Gökçen
Pegasus Airlines	Istanbul–Sabiha Gökçen
Turkish Airlines	Istanbul

== Traffic statistics ==
Adıyaman Airport passenger traffic statistics
Year (months)	Domestic	% change	International	% change	Total	% change
2025	385,447	▲6%	2,813	▼6%	388,260	▲6%
2024	363,729	▼1%	2,648	▲161%	366,377	▼1%
2023	367,383	▲101%	1,015	–	368,398	▲102%
2022	182,423	▲38%	–	–	182,423	▲38%
2021	132,535	▲8%	–	▼100%	132,535	▲7%
2020	122,505	▼50%	1,295	▼5%	123,800	▼49%
2019	243,207	▼13%	1,369	▼55%	244,576	▼13%
2018	277,986	▲8%	3,050	▲50%	281,036	▲8%
2017	257,741	▲7%	2,039	▼38%	259,780	▲6%
2016	241,459	▲26%	3,297	▲2055%	244,756	▲28%
2015	191,477	▲20%	153	–	191,630	▲20%
2014	159,268	▲35%	–	–	159,268	▲35%
2013	118,124	▲18%	–	–	118,124	▲18%
2012	100,522	▲122%	–	–	100,522	▲122%
2011	45,346	▼58%	–	–	45,346	▼58%
2010	108,507	▲27%	–	–	108,507	▲27%
2009	85,112	▼1%	–	–	85,112	▼1%
2008	86,280	▲77%	–	–	86,280	▲77%
2007	48,621	Steady	–	Steady	48,621	Steady
