= Mardin Airport =

Mardin Prof. Dr. Aziz Sancar Airport Mardin Prof. Dr. Aziz Sancar Havaalanı
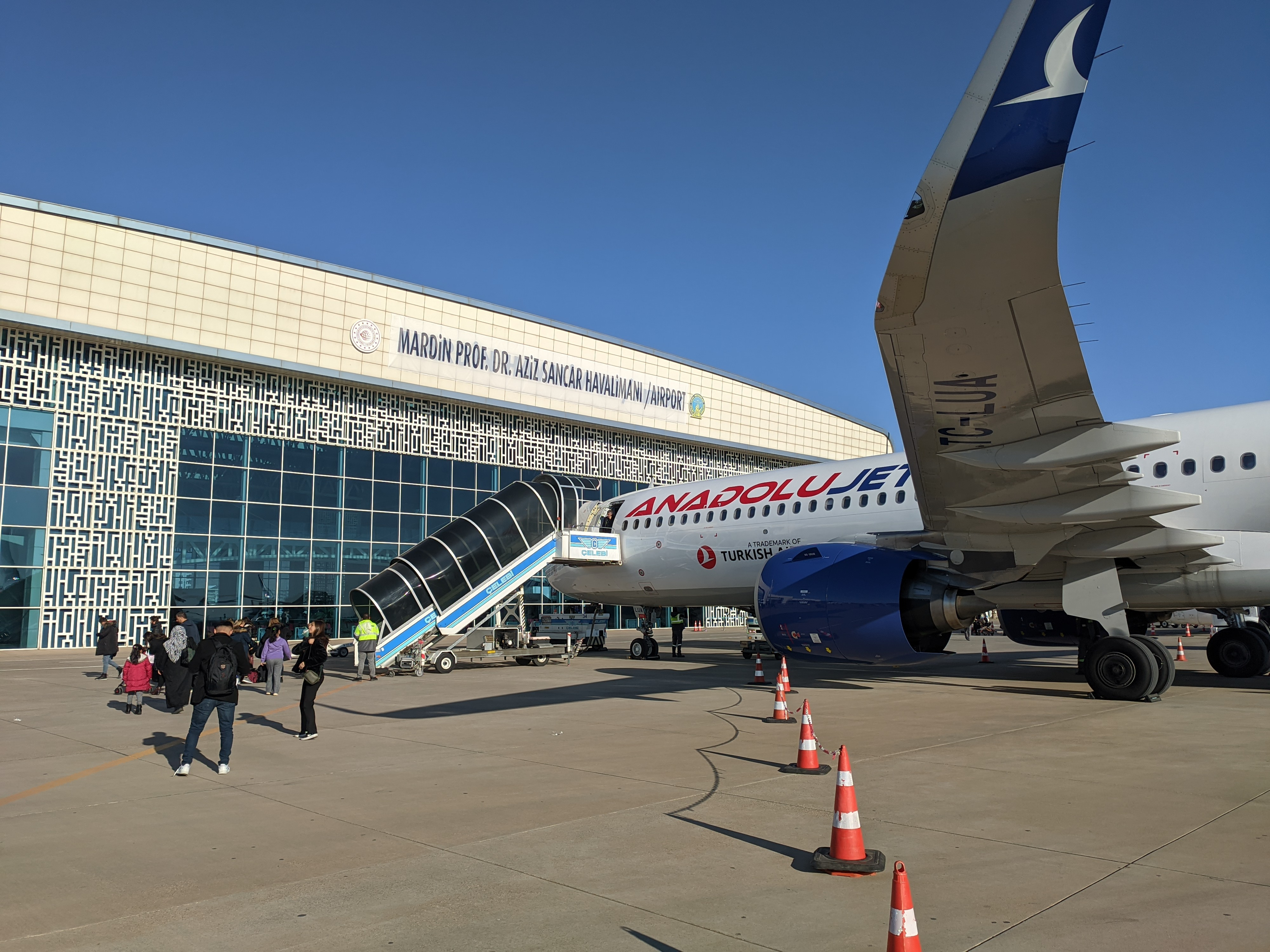
- IATA: MQM; ICAO: LTCR

Summary
- Airport type: Public
- Operator: General Directorate of State Airports Authority
- Serves: Mardin, Turkey
- Location: Kızıltepe, Mardin, Turkey
- Opened: 18 December 1999; 26 years ago
- Elevation AMSL: 1,729 ft / 527 m
- Coordinates: 37°13′58″N 40°38′26″E
- Website: www.dhmi.gov.tr

Map
- Location of airport in Turkey

Runways
Direction	Length		Surface
Direction	ft	m	Surface
03/21	8,202	2,500	Concrete

Statistics (2025)
- Annual passenger capacity: 3,000,000
- Passengers: 845,465
- Passenger change 2024–25: ▲9%
- Aircraft movements: 5,150
- Movements change 2024–25: ▲2%

Mardin Airport is an airport in Mardin (IATA: MQM, ICAO: LTCR), located in Kızıltepe, 20 km (12 mi) southeast of Mardin, in southeastern Turkey. On 17 December 2022, the airport was renamed Mardin Prof. Dr. Aziz Sancar Airport (Mardin Prof. Dr. Aziz Sancar Havalimanı) in honor of Nobel-winning chemist Aziz Sancar, who is a native of Mardin.

== Airlines and destinations ==
The following airlines operate regular scheduled and charter flights at Mardin Airport:

Airlines	Destinations
AJet	Ankara, Istanbul–Sabiha Gökçen
Pegasus Airlines	Istanbul–Sabiha Gökçen, İzmir
SunExpress	İzmir
Turkish Airlines	Istanbul

== Traffic statistics ==
Mardin–Prof. Dr. Aziz Sancar Airport Passenger Traffic Statistics
Year (months)	Domestic	% change	International	% change	Total	% change
2025	839,183	▲9%	6,282	▲65%	845,465	▲9%
2024	768,701	▲6%	3,796	▼20%	772,497	▲6%
2023	724,044	▲21%	4,768	▲597%	728,812	▲22%
2022	599,038	▲3%	684	-	599,722	▲3%
2021	580,889	▲46%	-	▼100%	580,889	▲46%
2020	397,050	▼30%	514	▼78%	397,564	▼30%
2019	565,856	▼20%	2,388	▼29%	568,244	▼20%
2018	709,404	▲5%	3,371	▼2%	712,775	▲5%
2017	677,418	▲6%	3,440	▲34%	680,858	▲6%
2016	637,816	▲12%	2,564	▲608%	640,380	▲13%
2015	568,348	▲31%	362	-	568,710	▲31%
2014	469,935	▲31%	-	-	469,935	▲31%
2013	359,809	▲29%	-	-	359,809	▲29%
2012	278,590	▲127%	-	-	278,590	▲127%
2011	122,912	▼60%	-	-	122,912	▼60%
2010	305,914	▲31%	-	-	305,914	▲31%
2009	233,288	▲21%	-	-	233,288	▲21%
2008	192.764	▲1%	-	-	192,764	▲1%
2007	191,383	Steady	-	Steady	191,383	Steady
