= Samsun Çarşamba Airport =

Airport in Samsun, Turkey

Samsun Çarşamba Airport Samsun Çarşamba Havalimanı
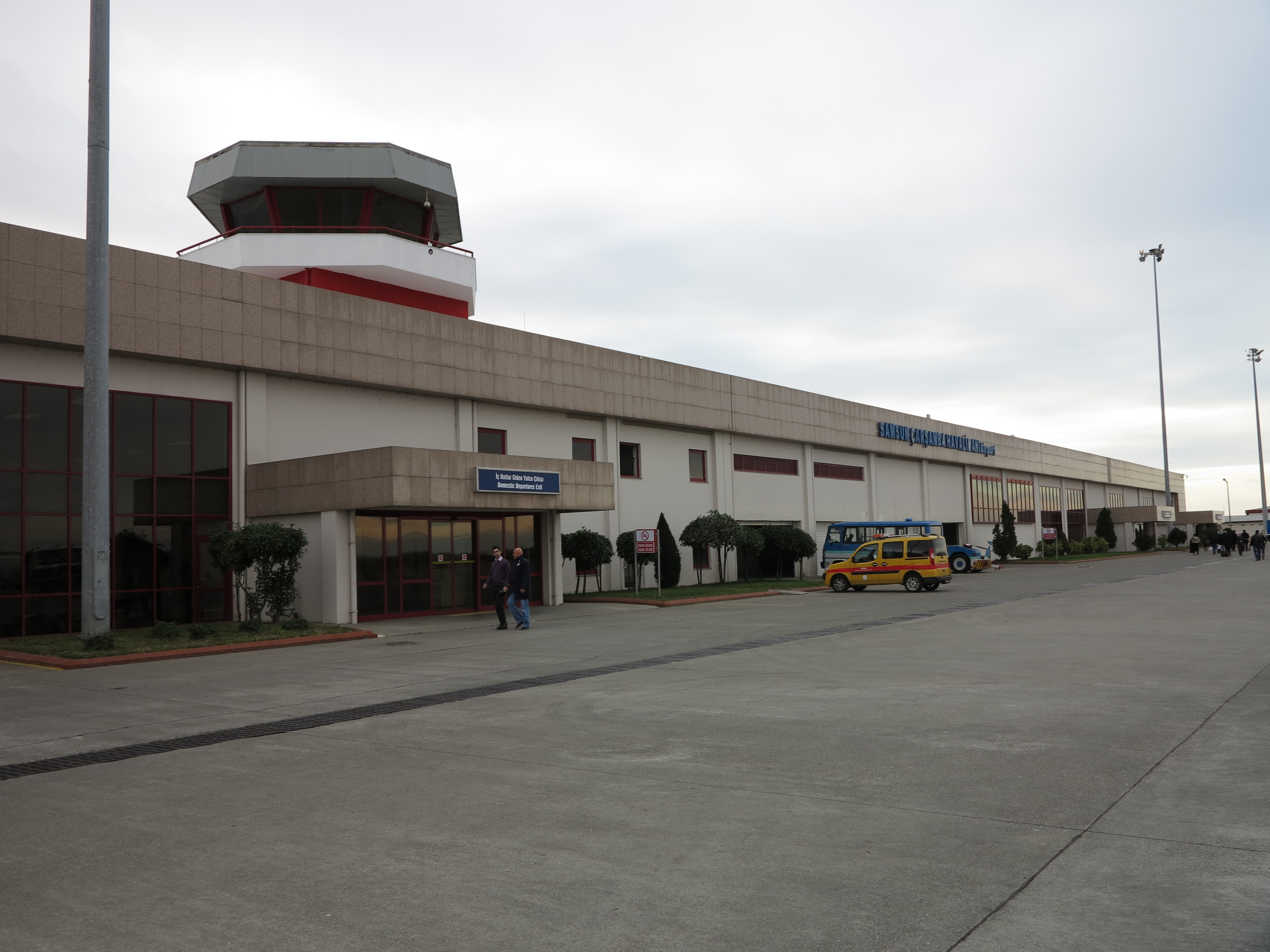
- IATA: SZF; ICAO: LTFH

Summary
- Airport type: Public
- Operator: General Directorate of State Airports Authority
- Serves: Samsun, Turkey
- Location: Çarşamba, Samsun, Turkey
- Opened: 15 December 1998; 27 years ago
- Operating base for: Pegasus Airlines
- Elevation AMSL: 17 ft (5.2 m)
- Coordinates: 41°15′56″N 36°32′55″E
- Website: www.dhmi.gov.tr/Sayfalar/Havalimani/Carsamba/AnaSayfa.aspx

Map
- Location of airport in Turkey SZF/LTFH (Europe)

Runways
Direction	Length		Surface
Direction	ft	m	Surface
13/31	9,842	3,000	Concrete

Statistics (2025)
- Annual passenger capacity: 2,000,000
- Passengers: 1,640,095
- Passenger change 2024–25: ▲8%
- Aircraft movements: 17,169
- Movements change 2024–25: ▲16%

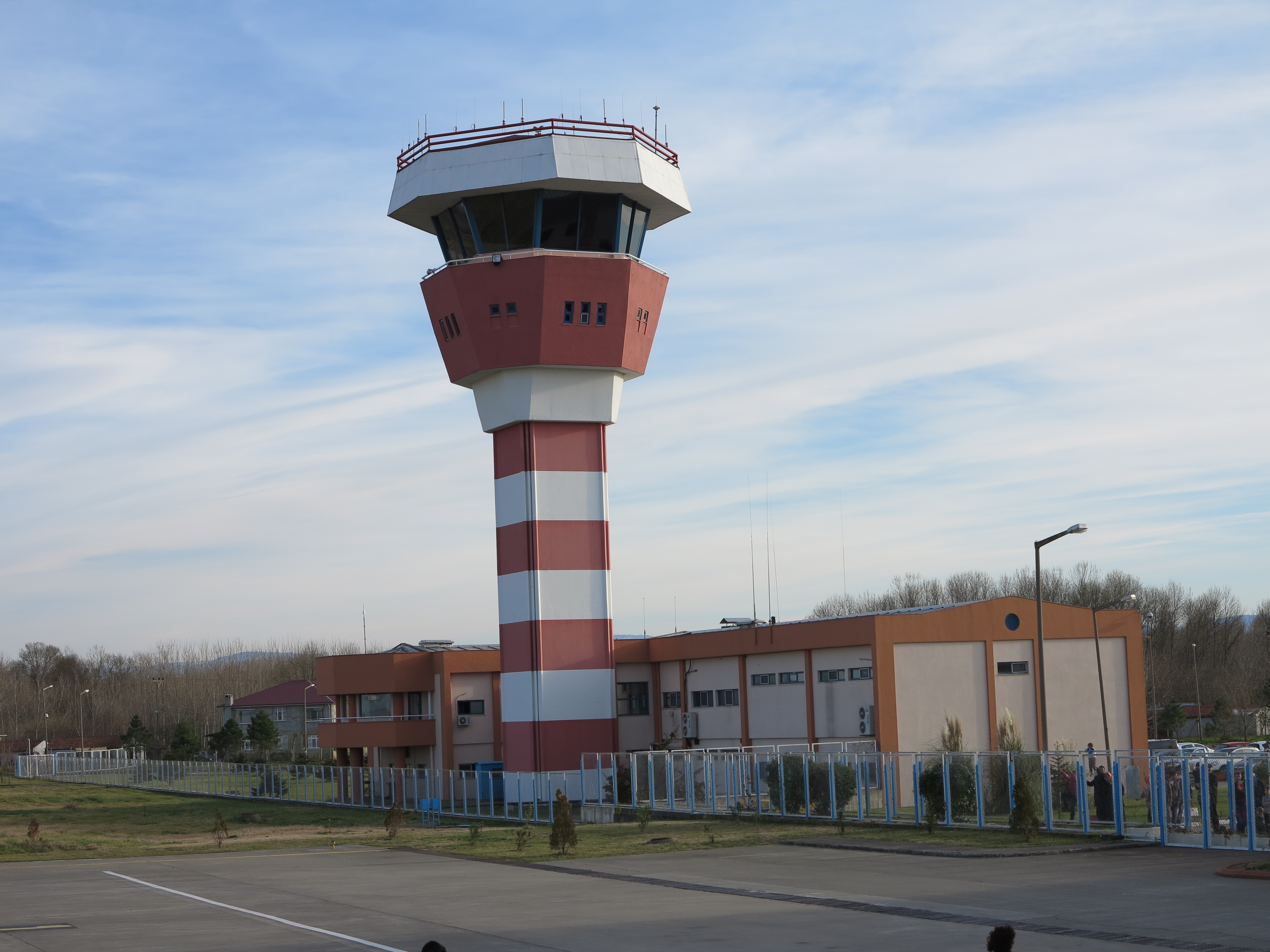
Control Tower

Samsun Çarşamba Airport (IATA: SZF, ICAO: LTFH) is a public airport in Samsun, Turkey. Opened in 1998, it is 23 km (14 mi) from Samsun. The airport consists of one terminal. Passengers board aircraft from ladder trucks on the tarmac.

The passenger terminal of the airport covers an area of 4,725 m^{2} and has a parking lot for 246 cars. The airport terminal has a restaurant, a bar and multiple car rental agencies within it. There are two small seating galleries.

== Airlines and destinations ==
The following airlines operate regular scheduled and charter flights at Samsun-Çarşamba Airport:

Airlines	Destinations
AJet	Ankara, Istanbul–Sabiha Gökçen; Seasonal: Berlin, Bodrum, Munich, Skopje, Stuttgart
Corendon Airlines	Seasonal: Düsseldorf, Hannover
Eurowings	Seasonal: Cologne/Bonn, Düsseldorf
Fly Baghdad	Seasonal: Baghdad
Iraqi Airways	Baghdad
Pegasus Airlines	Antalya, Istanbul–Sabiha Gökçen, Izmir; Seasonal: Berlin, Düsseldorf
SunExpress	Adana/Mersin, Antalya, Düsseldorf, Izmir; Seasonal: Berlin, Cologne/Bonn, Frankfurt, Hannover, Munich, Stuttgart, Vienna
Turkish Airlines	Istanbul; Seasonal: Berlin, Vienna
UR Airlines	Baghdad

== Traffic Statistics ==
Samsun–Çarşamba Airport Passenger Traffic Statistics
Year (months)	Domestic	% change	International	% change	Total	% change
2025	1,443,916	▲ %	196,179	▲1%	1,640,095	▲8%
2024	1,319,506	▲8%	194,748	▲9%	1,514,254	▲8%
2023	1,221,728	▲19%	178,401	▼1%	1,400,129	▲16%
2022	1,024,011	▲5%	180,359	▲20%	1,204,370	▲7%
2021	975,569	▲23%	150,509	▲97%	1,126,078	▲30%
2020	791,736	▼41%	76,405	▼46%	868,141	▼42%
2019	1,347,965	▼19%	141,368	▲38%	1,489,333	▼21%
2018	1,627,368	▲43%	108,154	▲165%	1,735,522	▲48%
2017	1,134,756	▼33%	40,769	▼47%	1,175,525	▼34%
2016	1,706,248	▲4%	77,591	▲5%	1,783,839	▲4%
2015	1,639,226	▲13%	74,021	▼3%	1,713,247	▲13%
2014	1,445,872	▲15%	76,186	▲4%	1,522,058	▲14%
2013	1,258,740	▲9%	73,408	▲15%	1,332,148	▲8%
2012	1,151,368	▲8%	86,323	▼5%	1,237,691	▲7%
2011	1,064,301	▲19%	90,857	▲38%	1,155,158	▲21%
2010	891,492	▲14%	65,899	▼24%	957,391	▲10%
2009	779,794	▲48%	87,068	▲14%	866,862	▲43%
2008	527,886	▲9%	76,501	▲9%	604,387	▲9%
2007	485,772	Steady	70,024	Steady	555,796	Steady

== Air traffic control ==
Air traffic controllers at the tower also control the nearby coastguard helicopters.

== Public Transportation ==
The airport is serviced by taxis, dolmus, charter bus and the H2 bus line run by the Samsun Metropolitan Municipality. Interest has been announced regarding extending the Samsun Tram to the airport or developing a bus line to connect the tram to the airport.

== Future expansion ==
Construction of a taxiway would remove landing delays due to previously landed aircraft taxiing back down the runway. However to do this land adjacent to the airport would need to be purchased.
