= Baghdad International School =

Location
- Baghdad; Iraq

Information
- Established: 1969

Baghdad International School (BIS) was an international school near Baghdad International Airport in Baghdad, Iraq. It followed the British curriculum and used English as the medium of instruction. It was governed by a committee made of nine members, five appointed by the UN Development Programme and four parents. It served Kindergarten/nursery through the final year of high school/sixth-form (K-12).

== History ==
It was initially established in 1969.

In 1983 the school received its latest charter. It had 900 students at that time. Around 1987 it had 500 students.

Due to the possibility of the U.S. government invading Iraq, around December 2002 European students withdrew from the school. In 2003 the school had a budget of $500,000 U.S. dollars. At the beginning of the year the school had 230 students from 38 countries. After Arab and Asian students withdrew from the school the enrollment plummeted to 133 as of February 2003, including 30 Iraqis who were children of diplomats. The school's final director was Graham Cherry, a New Zealander.

== Operations ==
Students were required to take Arabic classes. Iraqi students paid nominal tuition while foreign students, as of 2003, were charged every year from $2,000 to $2,700 U.S. dollars.
