= Düsseldorf Airport fire =

1996 fire in Düsseldorf, Germany

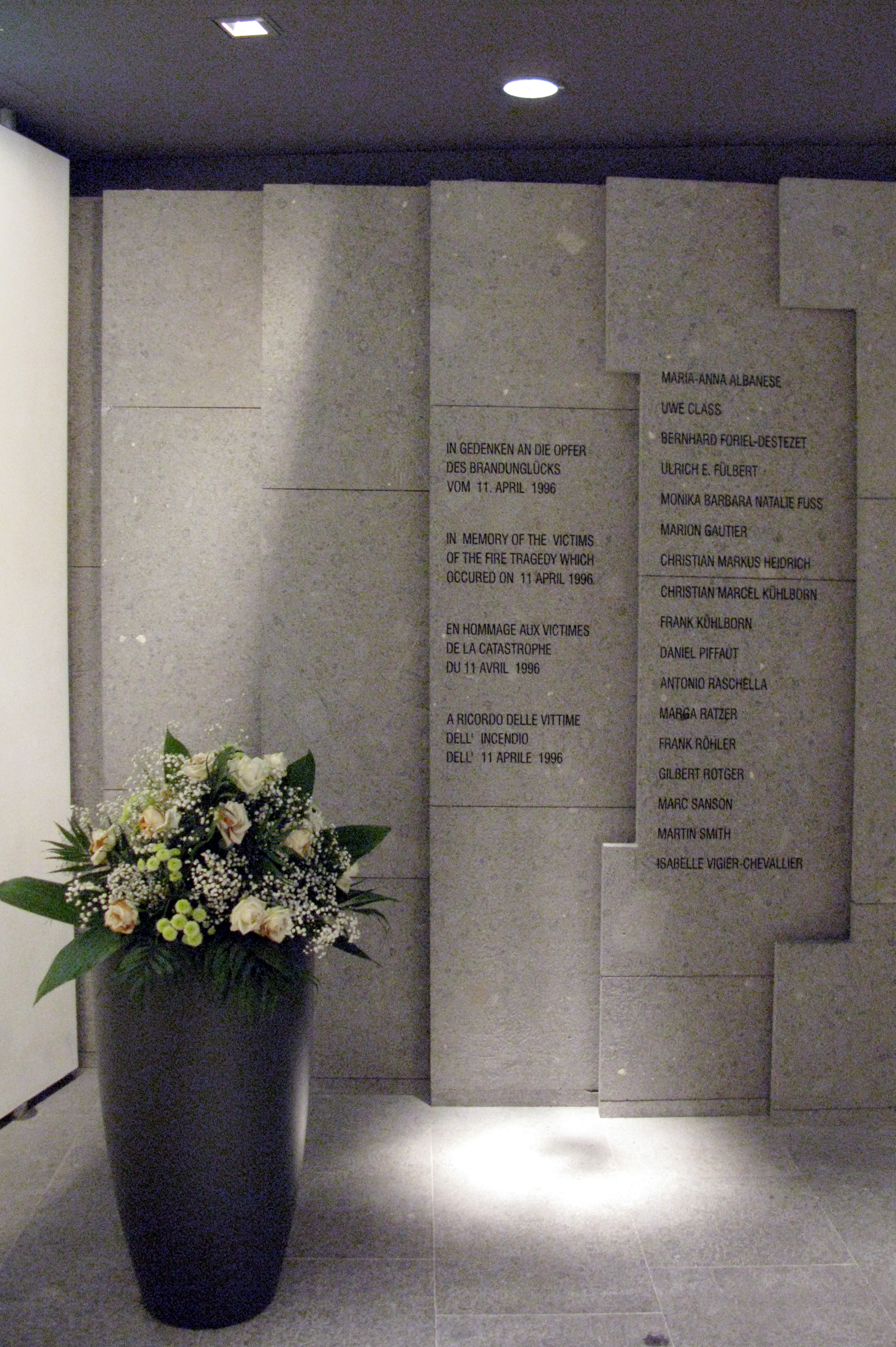
- Names of the victims in the airport memorial room
- Date: 11 April 1996
- Location: Düsseldorf Airport; 51.282°N 6.766°E
- Cause: Welding work on an elevated road
- Deaths: 17
- Injuries: 62–88

On 11 April 1996, a fire began inside the passenger terminal of Düsseldorf Airport, Germany, killing 17 people. As of 2013, it is the worst structural fire to have occurred in any commercial airport building. According to various sources, between 62 and 88 people were injured. The catastrophic conflagration is considered a prime example of a polystyrene fire, illustrating the flammability of such material. Approximately 1,000 firefighters were involved in extinguishing the blaze, which at the time was the largest fire response in the history of North Rhine-Westphalia.

== Cause and timeline ==
The fire was caused by welding work carried out on an expansion joint on the elevated access road of Terminal A, which began at around 13:00. Droplets of molten metal started smouldering inside the polystyrene insulation in the dropped ceiling of the arrivals hall below. This slow fire spread over a large area without being noticed.

At 15:31, a taxi driver informed the fire department that he had observed a few sparks falling out of the ceiling in the arrivals area. Two members of the airport fire brigade arrived on the scene a few minutes later, initially suspecting an electrical failure. At around 15:45, they learned of the welding work directly above, thus being able to finally identify the probable origin. By that time, smoke could be seen emanating from ceiling vents.

The situation grew out of control at 15:58. A flashover occurred, setting ablaze approximately 100 square metres (1,100 sq ft) of the ceiling within seconds. This was accompanied by an intense buildup of thick, black smoke. A total of 11 metric tons of polystyrene burned down, as well as numerous PVC cable coatings, releasing highly toxic substances including carbon monoxide, dioxins, hydrogen cyanide and hydrogen chloride. As there was neither a sprinkler system nor fire doors (which were not mandatory at that time), a wall of smoke spread through the terminal building.

At approximately 16:00 the headquarters of the airport fire brigade was informed about the extent of the fire, and reacted by calling for assistance from firefighters stationed in the adjacent municipalities. At 16:06, a general call for evacuation was put on the public address system of the airport. Until then, people in those parts of the airport that were not directly affected by the smoke had been unaware of the situation. Flight operations were halted at 16:36.

Many of the firefighters did not have any experience with fires of that kind, and necessary supplies were missing. The airport fire brigade had only been trained to address aviation accidents, not how to respond to a fire inside the airport building. At 19:20, the fire was under control, and it was declared to be put out at 21:30.

== Victims ==
All victims died from smoke inhalation rather than from heat injuries inflicted by the fire.

Due to the thick smoke, nine passengers found themselves trapped inside the Air France airport lounge on the mezzanine level above the arrivals hall of Terminal A. The self-service Salon was not staffed; passengers eligible to utilize the amenities were given an access code upon check-in. This may have contributed to the lack of knowledge about the nearest escape route which was only 8 metres away from the lounge exit. It led to a flat rooftop via two half staircases. Numerous phone calls were made from inside the lounge, the last one at 16:19. Although one of the victims described the location to be above the Lufthansa check-in, none of the involved personnel were aware of the exact location of the lounge, preventing it from being evacuated in time. All but one occupant suffocated. A French businessman managed to escape by smashing a window with a chair and falling 4 metres to the lower level. He was rescued at around 17:00, suffering from serious head injuries. He fully recovered from his injuries.

Seven people died in two elevators bringing people from the airport parking garage into the Terminal A arrivals hall, which at the time was fully ablaze. The victims had entered the elevators unaware of the fire, only to find themselves exposed to thick, toxic smoke which obstructed the optical door sensors, causing the elevator doors to remain open. A British soldier died inside a lavatory at the arrivals level of Terminal A. The last victim, an elderly woman, had initially escaped the fire but died two weeks later due to the consequences of smoke inhalation.

== Aftermath ==
Due to the effects of fire and smoke, Terminals A and B were rendered unusable, and the total damage was estimated at DM 1 billion. Several airlines temporarily moved their operations to nearby Cologne/Bonn Airport, until tents had been put up at Düsseldorf Airport to provide interim check-in and baggage claim services. These were later replaced by light-metal barracks (Terminals D and E). By 1 July 1996, Düsseldorf Airport had returned to 90 per cent of its original passenger capacity.

Terminal A was extensively renovated, and Terminal B was demolished completely and rebuilt; the terminals reopened in 1998 and 2001, respectively.

== Investigation ==
The official investigation into the accident revealed a number of safety and procedural flaws, as well as possible criminal offences:

- The airport fire brigade had not been informed about the welding work, otherwise a fire watch would have been dispatched.
- The highly flammable polystyrene sheeting inside the ceiling was installed illegally.
- There were no operational procedures for a fire inside the terminal building. Firefighters were missing floor plans and access keys, and communication problems were encountered between members of the airport fire brigade and external forces.
- The elevators were not put out of service once the general fire alarm was called.

In late 1996, a court trial was opened, charging a number of people including the two welders, the technical director of the airport, the architect, as well as building inspectors and supervisors. Following lengthy arguments over procedural questions, the case was postponed several times and finally abandoned in 2001, without a verdict identifying those responsible for the disaster.

== See also ==
- Nairobi Airport fire, which occurred on 7 August 2013 and destroyed a large part of the terminal building at Jomo Kenyatta International Airport
