= Corkscrew landing =

Method of landing an aircraft

A corkscrew landing (also spiral landing) is a method of landing an aircraft that is intended to minimize the risk of the aircraft being hit by anti-aircraft fire from the ground as it approaches to land at a destination airport. Instead of slow descent towards the airport, in a corkscrew landing the aircraft is positioned at high altitude above the airport, then descends rapidly in a spiral. The maneuver is typically performed by pilots of military aircraft to avoid surface-to-air missiles.

== Technique ==
A corkscrew landing involves positioning the aircraft over the landing site at altitude, then descending in a steeply banked spiral path. To do this the pilot of the aircraft banks the aircraft from the horizontal and begins a fast descent. Once closer to the airfield, the pilot will slowly level off and begin descent into the runway.

== History ==
The corkscrew landing maneuver has been reported as being performed in the Vietnam War.

It also became the standard method of landing by airlines flying into Baghdad International Airport after a DHL cargo aircraft was struck and nearly destroyed by a surface-to-air missile during takeoff in November 2003.
