= Düsseldorf Airport =

Airport in North Rhine-Westphalia, Germany

Düsseldorf Airport Flughafen Düsseldorf

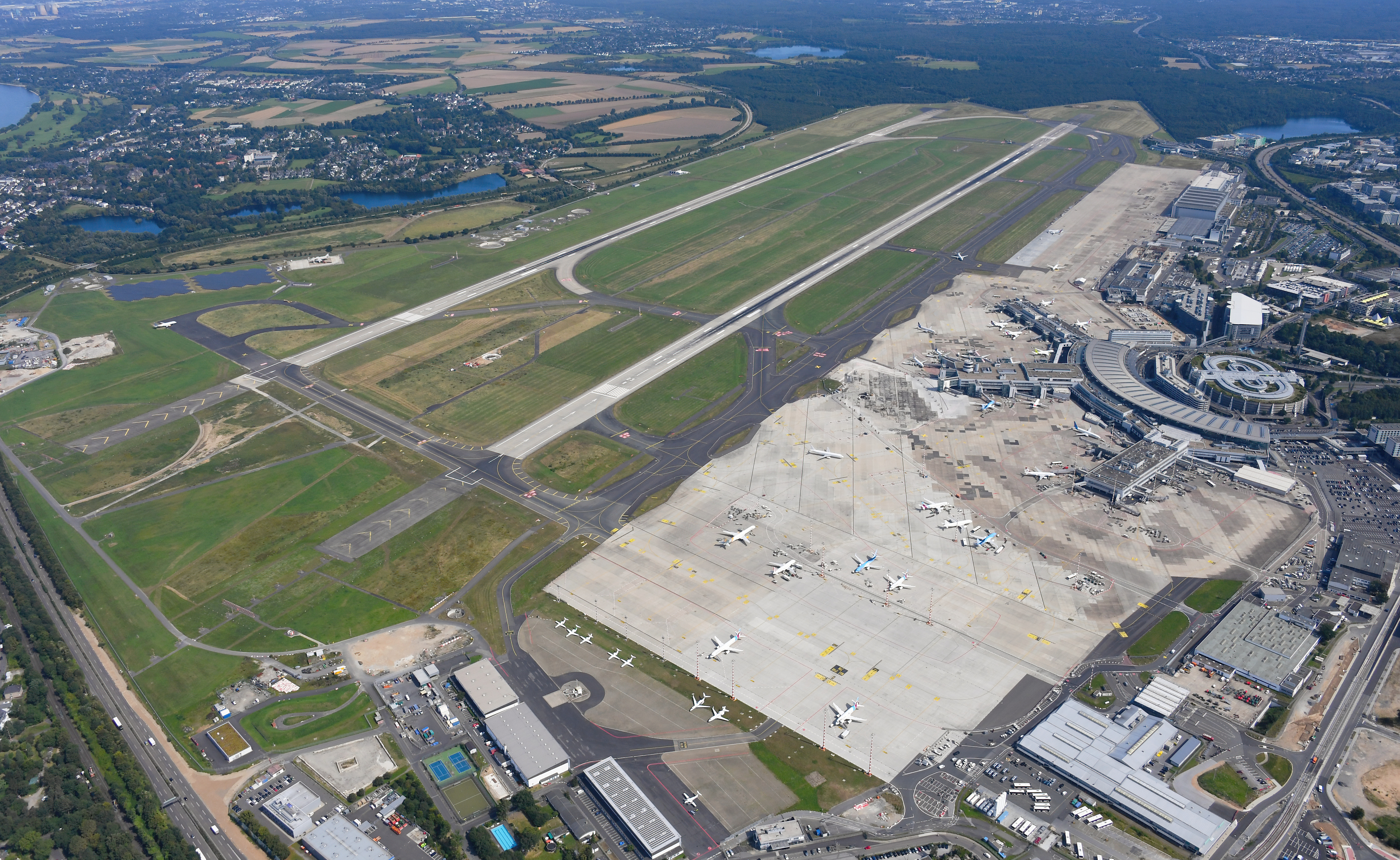
- IATA: DUS; ICAO: EDDL

Summary
- Airport type: Public
- Owner/Operator: Flughafen Düsseldorf GmbH
- Serves: Rhine-Ruhr
- Location: Lohausen, North Rhine-Westphalia, Germany
- Opened: 19 April 1927; 99 years ago
- Operating base for: Condor; Corendon Airlines; Eurowings; SunExpress; TUI fly Deutschland
- Elevation AMSL: 44.8 m (147 ft)
- Coordinates: 51°17′22″N 6°46′00″E
- Website: www.dus.com/en

Map
- Location in North Rhine-Westphalia DUS/EDDL (Germany) DUS/EDDL (Europe)

Runways
Direction	Length		Surface
Direction	m	ft	Surface
05R/23L	3,000	9,843	Concrete
05L/23R	2,700	8,859	Concrete

Statistics (2025)
- Passengers: 21,031,429 ▲+4.9%
- Aircraft movements: 159,984 ▲+2.8%
- Cargo (metric tons): 37,317 ▼-3.7%
- Sources: Flughafenverband ADV, AIP at German air traffic control.

Düsseldorf Airport (German: Flughafen Düsseldorf, pronounced [ˌfluːkhaːfn̩ ˈdʏsl̩dɔʁf]) (IATA: DUS, ICAO: EDDL), known as Düsseldorf International Airport until March 2013, is an international airport serving Düsseldorf, the capital of the German state of North Rhine-Westphalia, and the Rhine-Ruhr area, the largest metropolitan region in Germany. It is about 7 kilometres (4.3 mi; 3.8 nmi) north of downtown Düsseldorf and some 30 kilometres (19 mi; 16 nmi) southwest of Essen and about 15 kilometres (9.3 mi; 8.1 nmi) south of Duisburg in the Rhine-Ruhr area, Germany's largest metropolitan area.

Düsseldorf is the fourth-busiest airport in Germany and handled over 20 million passengers in 2024. It is a hub for Eurowings and a focus city for several more airlines. The airport has three passenger terminals and two runways and can handle wide-body aircraft up to the Airbus A380. Düsseldorf Airport serves almost every country in Europe and some destinations in Africa, the Middle East and North America.

== Overview ==
=== Usage ===
Düsseldorf Airport is the largest and primary airport for the Rhine-Ruhr metropolitan region – the largest metropolitan region in Germany. The airport is located in Düsseldorf-Lohausen. The largest nearby business centres are Düsseldorf and Essen; other cities within a 20-kilometre (12 mi) radius are Duisburg, Krefeld, Mülheim an der Ruhr, Neuss, and Wuppertal. The airport extends over a compact 6.13 square kilometres (2.37 sq mi) of land – small in comparison to airports of a similar capacity. The airport has more than 18,200 employees.

With around 16 million passengers passing through in 2022, the airport was the fourth busiest in Germany, after Frankfurt Airport, Munich Airport and Berlin Brandenburg Airport. It was the 31st-busiest airport in Europe in 2022.

=== Ownership ===
The city of Düsseldorf owns half the airport, with the other half owned by various commercial entities. Düsseldorf Airport is a public–private partnership with the following owners:

- 50% city of Düsseldorf
- 50% Airport Partners GmbH (owners: 40% AviAlliance GmbH, 40% DAA Group, 20% AviC GmbH & Co. KGaA)

== History ==
=== Early years ===
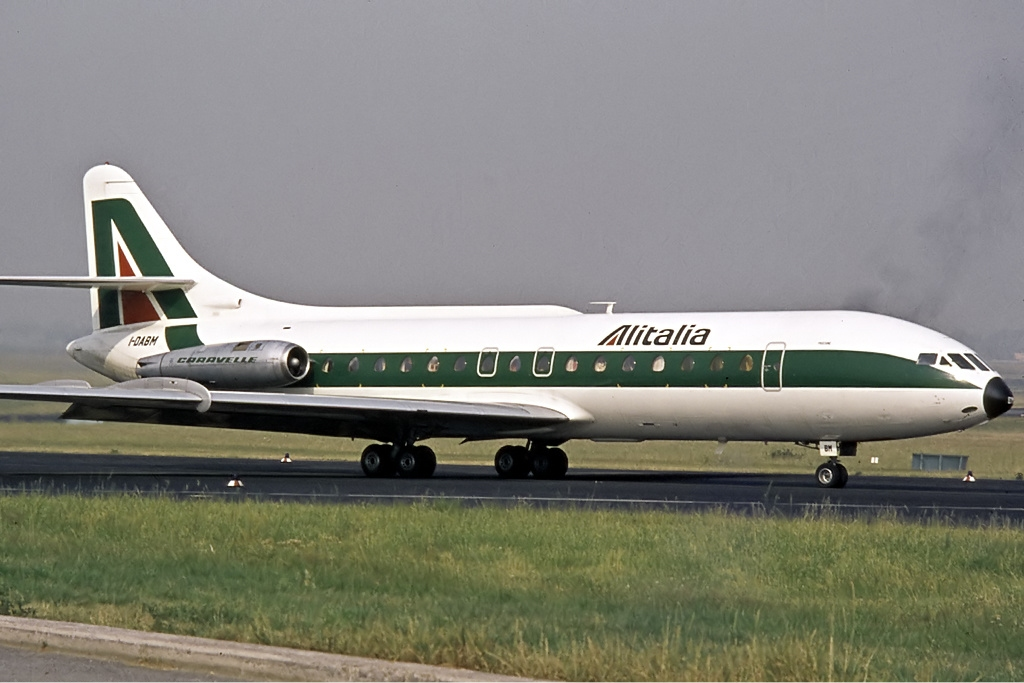
An Alitalia Caravelle at Düsseldorf Airport in 1973

The current airport was opened on 19 April 1927, after two years of construction. The first international route was inaugurated by SABENA in 1929 between Brussels, Antwerp, Düsseldorf and Hamburg.

At the beginning of World War II, civil use of the airport ceased in September 1939 and the airfield was used by the military. After the end of the war, the airport reopened for civil use in 1948. With the area under British administration, the first international flights were operated by British European Airways to London.

Since 1950, the airport is owned by a state-owned operations company.

On 1 April 1955, Lufthansa started services between Düsseldorf, Frankfurt am Main, and Munich, which still exist today. In 1959, the first scheduled jet aircraft landed in Düsseldorf on Scandinavian Airlines' Copenhagen-Khartoum route. In 1961, LTU relocated its home base from Cologne Bonn Airport and in the same year, Düsseldorf Airport handled more than one million passengers for the first time.

In 1969, the main runway was lengthened to 3000 metres while a new second terminal was under construction. The new Terminal 2, which is today's Terminal B, opened in April 1973. Another addition, today's Terminal A, was opened in 1977 while the last annex, Terminal C, opened in 1986.

=== Düsseldorf Airport fire ===
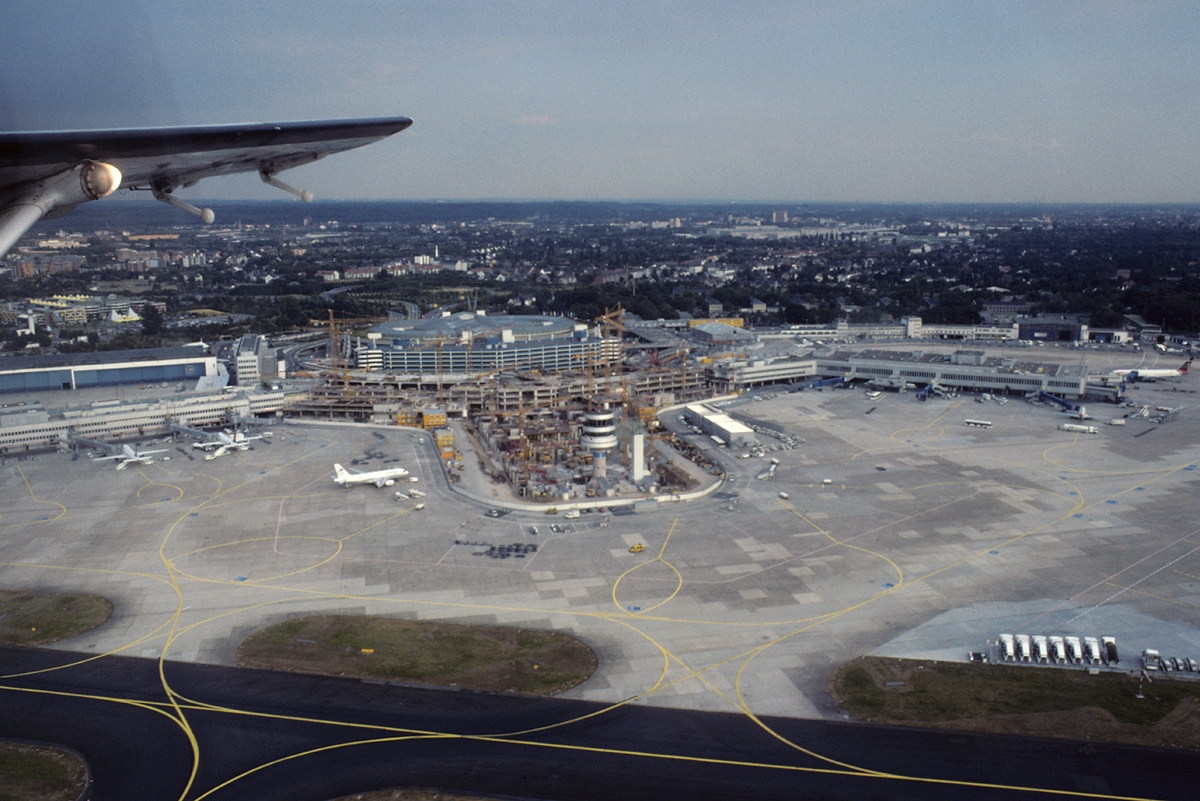
Reconstruction in progress in 1999 after the Düsseldorf Airport fire

On 11 April 1996, the Düsseldorf Airport fire, which is the worst structural airport fire worldwide to date, broke out. It was caused by welding work on an elevated road in front of Terminal A above its arrivals area. Insufficient structural fire protection allowed the fire and especially the smoke to spread fast, destroying large parts of the passenger areas of the airport. Seventeen people died, mostly due to smoke inhalation, with many more hospitalised. At the time, the fire was the biggest public disaster in the history of North Rhine-Westphalia. Damage to the airport was estimated at DM 1 billion; Terminals A and B had to be completely reconstructed. While repairs were ongoing, passengers were housed in big tents.

In November 1997, Terminal C was completely redeveloped, with three lightweight construction halls serving as departure areas. Also in 1997 construction began on the new inter-city railway station at the eastern edge of the airport. In 1998 the rebuilt Terminal A was reopened and the airport changed its name from "Rhine Ruhr Airport" to "Düsseldorf International". Reconstruction of the central building and Terminal B began in the same year.

=== Development since the 2000s ===
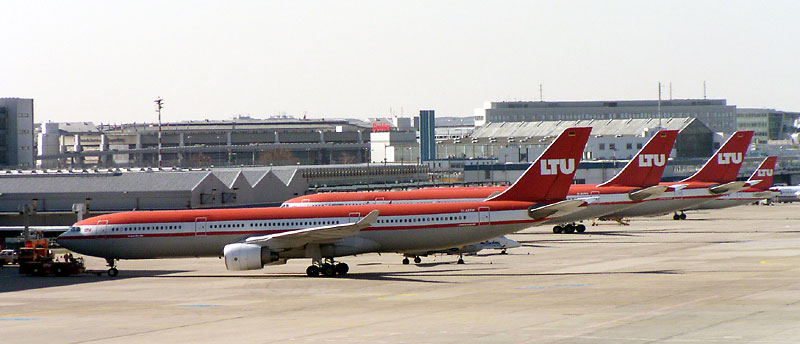
Several LTU Airbus A330-300s at their Düsseldorf base in 2003

The first construction stage in the "Airport 2000+" programme commenced in 1998 with the laying of a foundation stone for an underground parking garage under the new terminal.

The new Düsseldorf Airport station was opened in May 2000, with a capacity of 300 train departures daily. 16 million passengers used the airport that year; Düsseldorf is now the third-biggest airport in Germany. The new departures hall and Terminal B were opened in July 2001 after 2½ years of construction time; the rebuilt Gebäude Ost (East Building) was reopened.

In 2002, the inter-terminal shuttle bus service was replaced by the suspended monorail called the SkyTrain connecting the terminal building with the InterCity train station. The monorail travels the 2.5 kilometres (1.6 mi) between the terminal and station at a maximum speed of 50 kilometres per hour (31 mph). The system was developed by Siemens and is based on the similar H-Bahn operating with two lines on the Dortmund university campus.

On 12 November 2006, the first Airbus A380 landed in Düsseldorf as part of a Lufthansa promotional flight.

In March 2013, the Airport received a new corporate design and dropped the phrase International from its official name.

In January 2015, Emirates announced it would schedule the Airbus A380 on one of their two daily flights from Dubai to Düsseldorf starting in July 2015. In May 2015, the airport finished construction of the new facilities needed to handle the A380, including a parking position with three jet-bridges, widened taxiways and new ground handling equipment.

In June 2015, Lufthansa announced the closure of its long-haul base at Düsseldorf Airport for economic reasons by October 2015. The base consisted of two Airbus A340-300s which served Newark and Chicago-O'Hare. Newark remained a year-round service which is operated in a W-pattern from Munich Airport (Munich - Newark - Düsseldorf - Newark - Munich) while the Chicago service was suspended for the winter 2015/2016 season. A few months later, Lufthansa announced the cancellation of the Düsseldorf-Chicago route. The same route was served by American Airlines during the summer seasons from 2013 to 2016, when it was discontinued.

In January 2017, the airport's largest hub operator Air Berlin announced a massive downsizing of its operations due to restructuring measures. While some leisure routes were handed to Niki more than a dozen destinations were cancelled entirely. In August 2017, Air Berlin also announced the termination of all long-haul routes from Düsseldorf to destinations in the Caribbean on short notice due to ongoing bankruptcy proceedings. However, both Condor and Eurowings announced it would step in and start some of the terminated Caribbean destinations by themselves. Shortly after, Air Berlin also announced the termination of all remaining long-haul operations leading to the loss of several connections to the United States at Düsseldorf Airport. On 9 October 2017, Air Berlin announced the termination of all of its own operations, excluding wet leases, by the end of the month leading to the loss of one of the airport's largest customers.

In February 2018, Eurowings announced the relocation of all long-haul routes currently served from Cologne Bonn Airport to Düsseldorf by late October 2018 to strengthen its presence there.

In March 2018, Lufthansa announced it would close its base at Düsseldorf Airport after the 2018/2019 winter schedule which ended in March 2019. When the single remaining long-haul route to Newark was taken over by Eurowings, 400 staff members were offered a relocation to either Frankfurt Airport or Munich Airport. In November 2018, Ryanair also announced they would close their base in Düsseldorf after only a year. Its routes were taken over by Lauda.

In August 2020, Delta Air Lines removed the Atlanta route from their schedule due to the COVID-19 pandemic. It started resuming its three-times-weekly service to and from Atlanta on 9 May 2023, albeit making the route to Düsseldorf summer seasonal only, therefore leaving the airport without any transatlantic connection in the winter season.

Shortly after Delta Air Lines suspended its Atlanta route, Ryanair announced the closure of its base in Düsseldorf — which was operated on a wetlease basis by Lauda — by 24 October 2020. In September 2020, Singapore Airlines permanently removed the route to Singapore from their schedule.

In the autumn of 2022, German airline Sundair drastically reduced its operations from Düsseldorf, leaving a single route to Beirut. The two previously based aircraft were relocated. In January 2023 it became public that Sundair would not return to Düsseldorf in the summer season of 2023 with any flight, eradicating its former base from the network. Just five months after resuming the previously long-standing route to Atlanta, Delta Air Lines announced in September 2023 that it would not return to Düsseldorf in the 2024 summer season, leaving Düsseldorf without scheduled transatlantic flights.

== Facilities ==
Airport Map

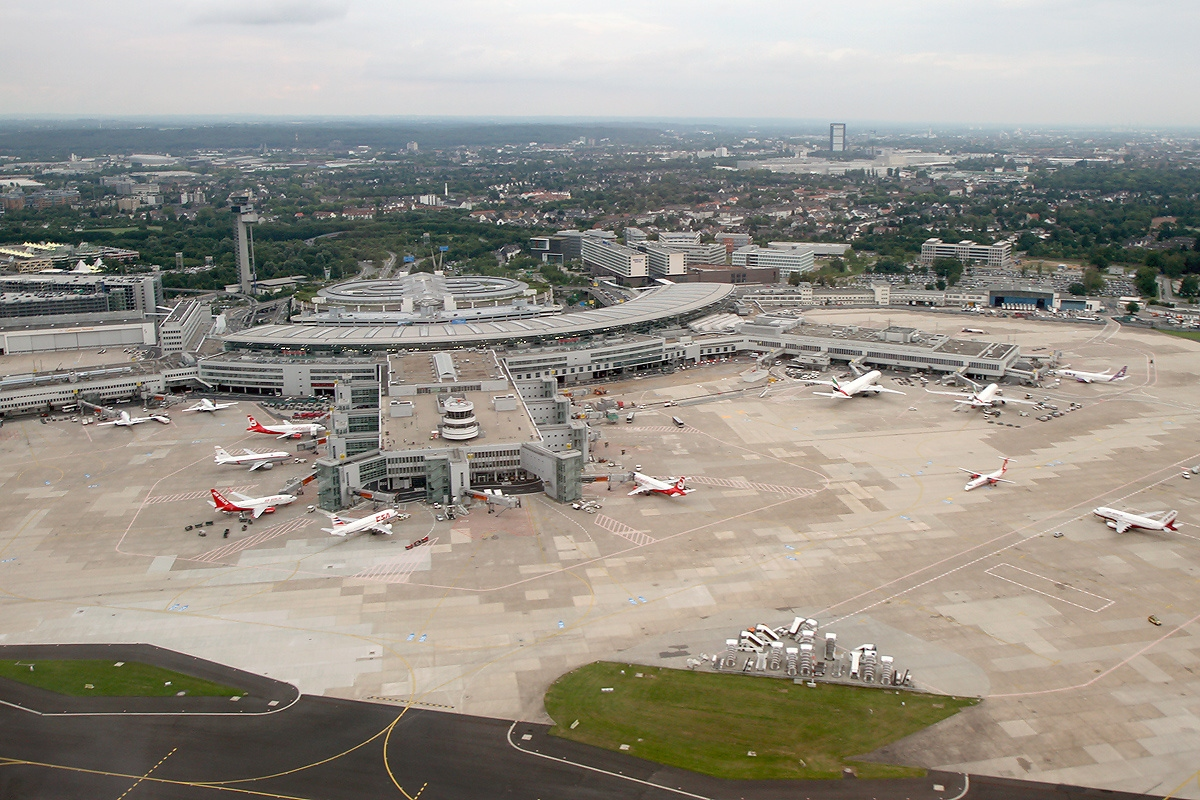
Terminal buildings

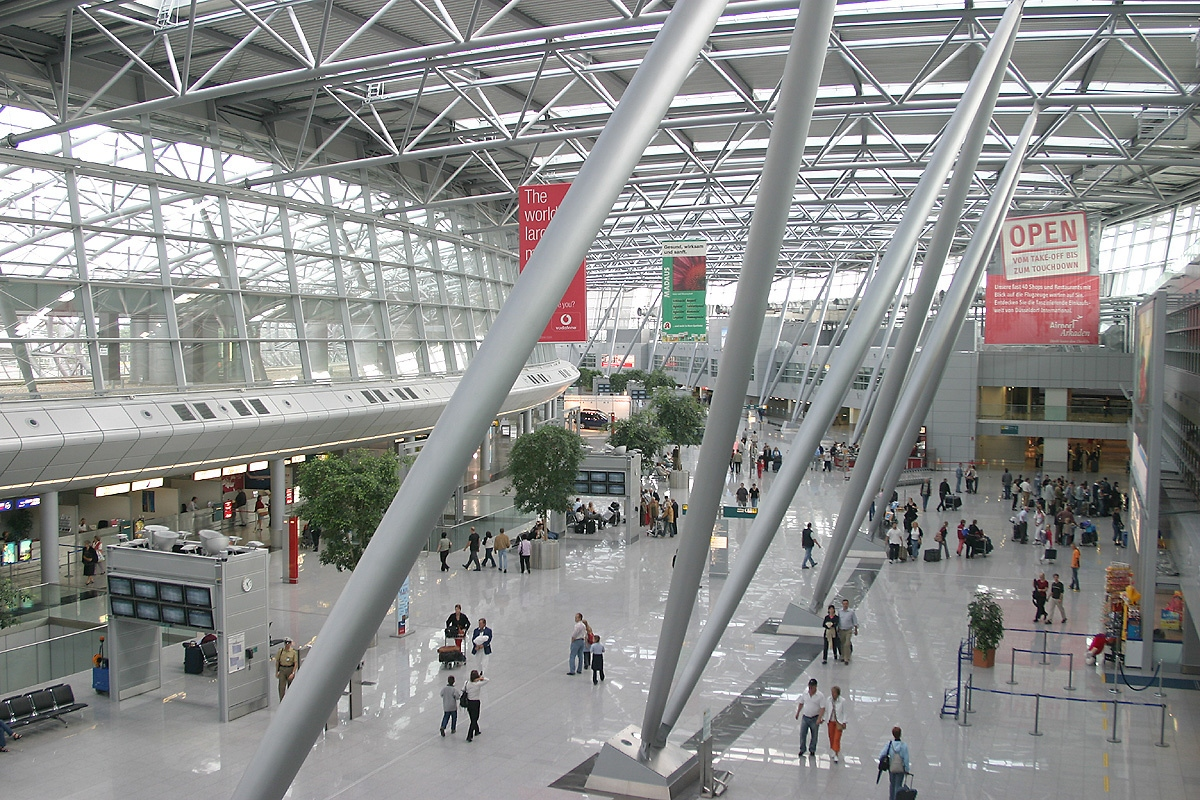
Main check-in hall

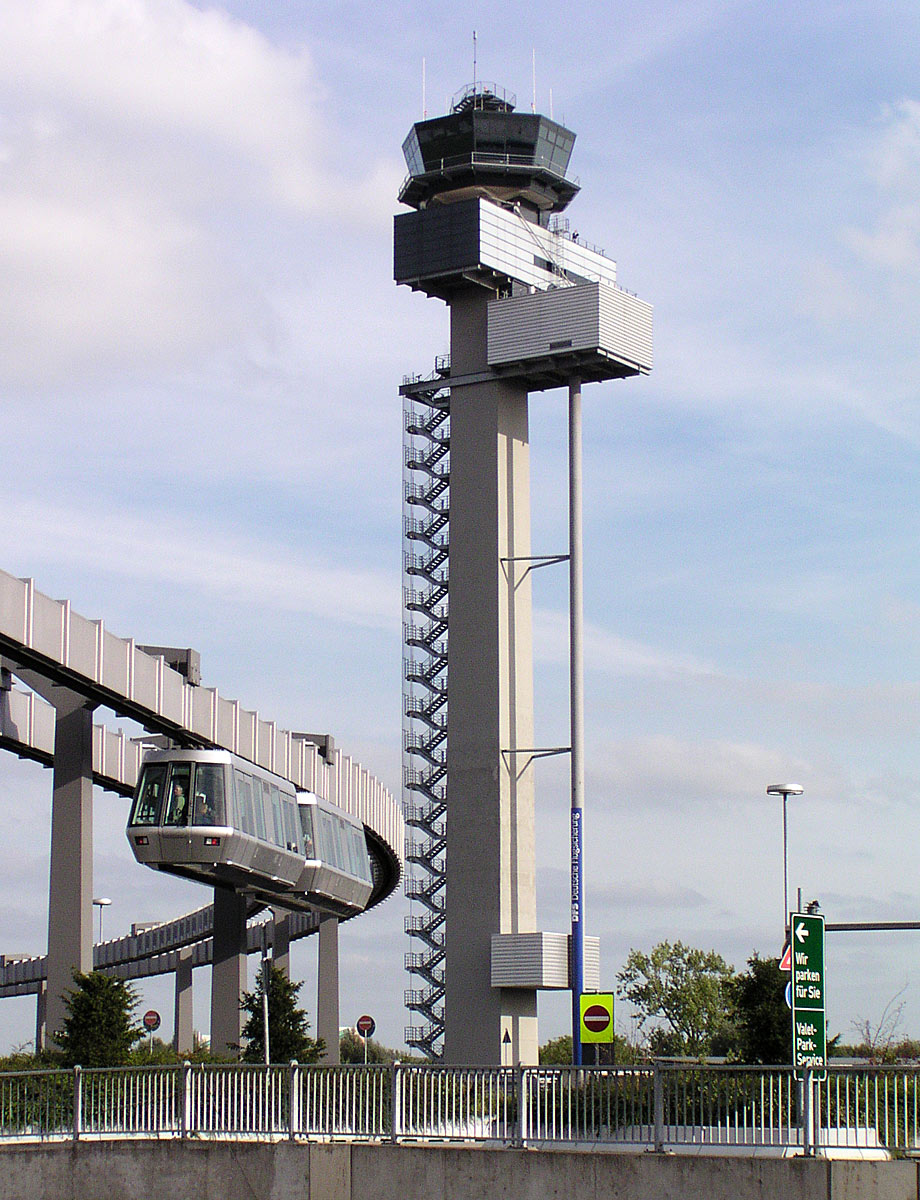
Control tower

=== Terminals ===
Düsseldorf Airport has three terminals connected by a central spine, even though the terminals are essentially concourses within a single terminal building. The current terminal buildings are capable of handling up to 22 million passengers per year.

==== Terminal A ====
Terminal A was opened in 1977 and has 16 gates (A01–A16) used by Lufthansa and Eurowings, its airline partners and Star Alliance members, Austrian Airlines, Croatia Airlines, LOT Polish Airlines, Scandinavian Airlines, TAP Air Portugal, and Swiss International Air Lines. Terminal A houses two Lufthansa lounges. It was refurbished fundamentally for two years after the 1996 fire.

==== Terminal B ====
Terminal B was originally inaugurated in 1973 and has 11 gates (B01–B11) used for domestic and EU flights by a few Star Alliance members such as Aegean Airlines, but mainly by SkyTeam and Oneworld members like Air France, British Airways, KLM, Finnair, Iberia and ITA Airways. Also located within this terminal are leisure carriers such as TUIfly and Condor. Terminal B houses an observation deck, which got shut down after the COVID-19 outbreak due to economic reasons, and one contract lounge After the fire in 1996, the whole terminal building was torn down and reconstructed. It was reopened in 2001.

==== Terminal C ====
Terminal C was opened in 1986 and has 8 gates (C01–C08) used exclusively for non-Schengen flights by non-Star Alliance airlines (except Turkish Airlines). These are long-haul flights – among others – by Emirates and Etihad Airways. Terminal C has a direct access to Airport City's Maritim Hotel, part of a German hotel chain, and houses lounges operated by the airport and Emirates. Terminal C was the least affected terminal after the fire in 1996, reopening the same year after intensive maintenance work. Thus it was the only usable Terminal at Düsseldorf Airport for a couple of years. Terminal C features the airport's only parking position equipped with three jet-bridges to handle the Airbus A380.

==== Executive Terminal ====
Jet Aviation operates a small terminal solely for private and corporate customers.

=== Runways and apron ===
Düsseldorf has two runways, which are 3,000 metres (9,843 ft) and 2,700 metres (8,858 ft) long. There are plans to extend the 3,000-metre (9,843 ft) runway to 3,600 metres (11,811 ft), but the town of Ratingen has been blocking the expansion, as it lies within the approach path of the runway. 107 aircraft parking positions are available on the aprons.

=== Airport City ===
Starting in 2003, an area of 23 hectares (57 acres) southwest of the airport terminal began redevelopment as Düsseldorf Airport City with an anticipated gross floor area of 250,000 square metres (2,700,000 sq ft). Already based at Düsseldorf Airport City are corporate offices of Siemens and VDI, a large Porsche centre and showroom, a Maritim Hotel, and a Sheraton Hotel. Messe Düsseldorf is situated in close proximity to Düsseldorf Airport City (some 500 m or 1,600 ft).

== Airlines and destinations ==
=== Passenger ===
The following airlines offer regular scheduled and charter flights at Düsseldorf Airport:

Airlines	Destinations
Aegean Airlines	Athens, Thessaloniki
Aer Lingus	Dublin
Air Anka	Seasonal charter: Antalya
Air Arabia	Sharjah (begins 16 December 2026)
Air Cairo	Hurghada, Marsa Alam, Sharm El Sheikh
Air Europa	Madrid (resumes 30 November 2026)
Air France	Paris–Charles de Gaulle
Air Serbia	Belgrade
airBaltic	Riga, Vilnius
AJet	Ankara, Istanbul–Sabiha Gökçen; Seasonal: Antalya, Dalaman (begins 24 April 2027), Milas/Bodrum (begins 5 July 2027)
Austrian Airlines	Vienna
British Airways	London–Heathrow
Condor	Agadir,, Fuerteventura, Funchal, Gran Canaria, Hurghada, Lanzarote, La Palma, Palma de Mallorca, Sulaimaniyah, Tenerife–South; Seasonal: Antalya, Beirut, Chania, Corfu, Heraklion, Ibiza, Jerez de la Frontera, Kos, Lamezia Terme, Larnaca, Málaga, Olbia, Preveza/Lefkada, Rhodes, Samos, Split, Zakynthos; Seasonal charter: Barbados, Fort-de-France, Genoa, Montego Bay, Pristina
Corendon Airlines	Antalya, Fuerteventura, Gazipasa, Gran Canaria, Hurghada, Kayseri, Palma de Mallorca, Tenerife–South, Zonguldak; Seasonal: Adana/Mersin, Ankara, Bodrum, Corfu, Curaçao (begins 14 December 2026), Edremit, Heraklion, İzmir, Kos, Lanzarote, Marsa Alam, Nador, Rhodes, Samsun
Croatia Airlines	Seasonal: Split
Egyptair	Cairo
easyJet	London–Gatwick, Milan–Malpensa; Seasonal: Edinburgh, Nice
Egyptair	Cairo
Electra Airways	Seasonal: Burgas, Varna
Emirates	Dubai–International
Enter Air	Pristina
Etihad Airways	Abu Dhabi
Eurowings	Alicante, Athens, Barcelona, Beirut, Berlin, Bilbao, Birmingham, Bologna, Bucharest–Otopeni, Budapest, Cairo, Catania, Copenhagen, Dresden, Edinburgh, Erbil, Faro, Fuerteventura, Funchal, Geneva, Gothenburg, Gran Canaria, Graz, Hamburg, Hurghada, Jerez de la Frontera, Kraków, Lanzarote, Larnaca, Lisbon, London–Heathrow, Lyon, Madrid, Málaga, Malta, Manchester, Marsa Alam, Milan-Bergamo, Milan-Linate, Milan–Malpensa, Munich, Naples, Newcastle upon Tyne, Nice, Palma de Mallorca, Porto, Prague, Pristina, Rome–Fiumicino, Salzburg, Seville, Sofia, Split, Stockholm–Arlanda, Sylt, Tallinn, Tel Aviv, Tenerife–South, Thessaloniki, Tirana, Tromsø, Tunis, Valencia, Venice, Vienna, Warsaw–Chopin, Yerevan, Zürich; Seasonal: Agadir, Baghdad (begins 14th December 2026), Adana/Mersin Antalya, Bari, Bastia, Bergen, Brindisi, Burgas, Cagliari, Casablanca, Chania, Corfu, Dublin, Dubrovnik, Florence, Gdańsk, Heraklion, Iași, Ibiza, Ivalo, Izmir, Jersey, Kalamata, Karpathos, Kavala, Kiruna, Kittilä, Kos, Kütahya, Kuusamo, Lamezia Terme, La Palma, Marrakesh, Marseille, Menorca, Monastir, Mostar, Mykonos, Nador, Newquay, Olbia, Palermo, Ponta Delgada, Preveza/Lefkada, Pula, Reykjavík–Keflávik, Rijeka, Rhodes, Rovaniemi, Samos, Samsun, Santorini, Tbilisi, Tivat, Varna, Verona, Volos, Zadar, Zakynthos; Seasonal charter: Genoa
Finnair	Helsinki
FlyErbil	Erbil, Sulaimaniyah
FlyOne	Chișinău; Seasonal: Yerevan
Freebird Airlines	Seasonal: Hurghada
HiSky	Chișinău
Iberia	Madrid
Iraqi Airways	Baghdad, Erbil
Israir	Tel Aviv
KLM	Amsterdam
KM Malta Airlines	Malta
La Compagnie	Seasonal: Newark (begins 21 April 2027)
LEAV Aviation	Aleppo, Damascus
LOT Polish Airlines	Warsaw–Chopin
Lufthansa	Frankfurt, Munich
Lufthansa City Airlines	Munich
MedSky Airways	Benghazi, Tripoli
Middle East Airlines	Beirut
Norwegian Air Shuttle	Oslo
Nouvelair	Djerba, Monastir, Tunis
Pegasus Airlines	Ankara, Istanbul–Sabiha Gökçen, Izmir, Kayseri, Trabzon; Seasonal: Antalya, Ordu/Giresun
Qatar Airways	Doha
Royal Air Maroc	Seasonal: Nador, Oujda
Royal Jordanian	Amman–Queen Alia
Scandinavian Airlines	Copenhagen, Oslo
Sky Alps	Bolzano,
Sky Express	Athens, Thessaloniki
Skyline Express	Antalya
SunExpress	Adana/Mersin, Ankara, Antalya, Bursa, Diyarbakır, Elazığ, Erzurum, Gaziantep, Izmir, Kayseri, Samsun, Trabzon; Seasonal: Antakya, Bodrum, Dalaman, Edremit, Konya, Kütahya, Malatya, Ordu/Giresun, Zonguldak
Swiss International Air Lines	Zürich
TAP Air Portugal	Lisbon
TUI Airways	Seasonal: Manchester
TUI fly Deutschland	Boa Vista, Dakar–Diass, Fuerteventura, Gran Canaria, Hurghada, Lanzarote, Marsa Alam, Sal, Tenerife–North, Tenerife–South; Seasonal: Corfu, Dalaman, Enfidha, Faro, Funchal, Heraklion, Ibiza, Jerez de la Frontera, Kos, Larnaca, Ljubljana (begins 4 May 2027), Luxor, Málaga (begins 2 May 2027), Menorca, Naples (begins 2 May 2027), Palma de Mallorca, Patras, Rhodes, Sälen-Trysil Sharm El Sheikh Venice (begins 2 May 2027)
Tunisair	Tunis
Turkish Airlines	Istanbul
TUS Airways	Tel Aviv
Ur Airlines	Erbil
Vueling	Barcelona

=== Cargo ===
Airlines	Destinations
FedEx Express	Paris–Charles de Gaulle

== Statistics ==
=== Passengers and freight ===
	Passengers	Movements	Freight (in t)
2000	16.03 million	194,016	59,361
2001	▼15.40 million	▼193,514	▼51,441
2002	▼14.75 million	▼190,300	▼46,085
2003	▼14.30 million	▼186,159	▲48,419
2004	▲15.26 million	▲200,584	▲86,267
2005	▲15.51 million	▲200,619	▲88,058
2006	▲16.59 million	▲215,481	▲97,000
2007	▲17.83 million	▲227,899	▼89,281
2008	▲18.15 million	▲228,531	▲90,100
2009	▼17.79 million	▼214,024	▼76,916
2010	▲18.98 million	▲215,540	▲87,995
2011	▲20.39 million	▲221,668	▼81,521
2012	▲20.80 million	▼210,298	▲86,820
2013	▲21.23 million	▲210,828	▲110,814
2014	▲21.85 million	▼210,732	▲114,180
2015	▲22.48 million	▼210,208	▼90,862
2016	▲23.52 million	▲217,575	▲93,689
2017	▲24.62 million	▲221,635	▲102,107
2018	▼24.28 million	▼218,820	▼75,030
2019	▲25.51 million	▲225,935	▼65,918
2020	▼6.6 million	▼78,805	▼20,936
2021	▲7.95 million	▲82,189	▲22,538
2022	▲16.07 million	▲140,598	
2023	▲19.12 million	▲151,577	
2024	▲20.02 million	▼146,497	
2025	▲21.01 million	▲151,489	

=== Busiest routes ===
Busiest domestic and international routes from Düsseldorf Airport (2025)
Rank	Destination	Passengers handled
1	Palma de Mallorca	1,333,196
2	Istanbul	1,322,967
3	Antalya	1,166,738
4	Munich	918,087
5	London	688,635
6	Dubai	579,643
7	Vienna	527,571
8	Hurghada	498,029
9	Frankfurt	314,243
10	Doha	234,613

Source: Düsseldorf Airport

=== Largest airlines ===
Largest airlines by passengers handled (2025)
Rank	Airline	Passengers handled
1	Lufthansa/Eurowings/Lufthansa City Airlines	8.5 million
2	Condor	1.8 million
3	SunExpress	1.5 million
4	TUI fly Deutschland	1.0 million
5	Pegasus Airlines	907,000

== Ground transportation ==
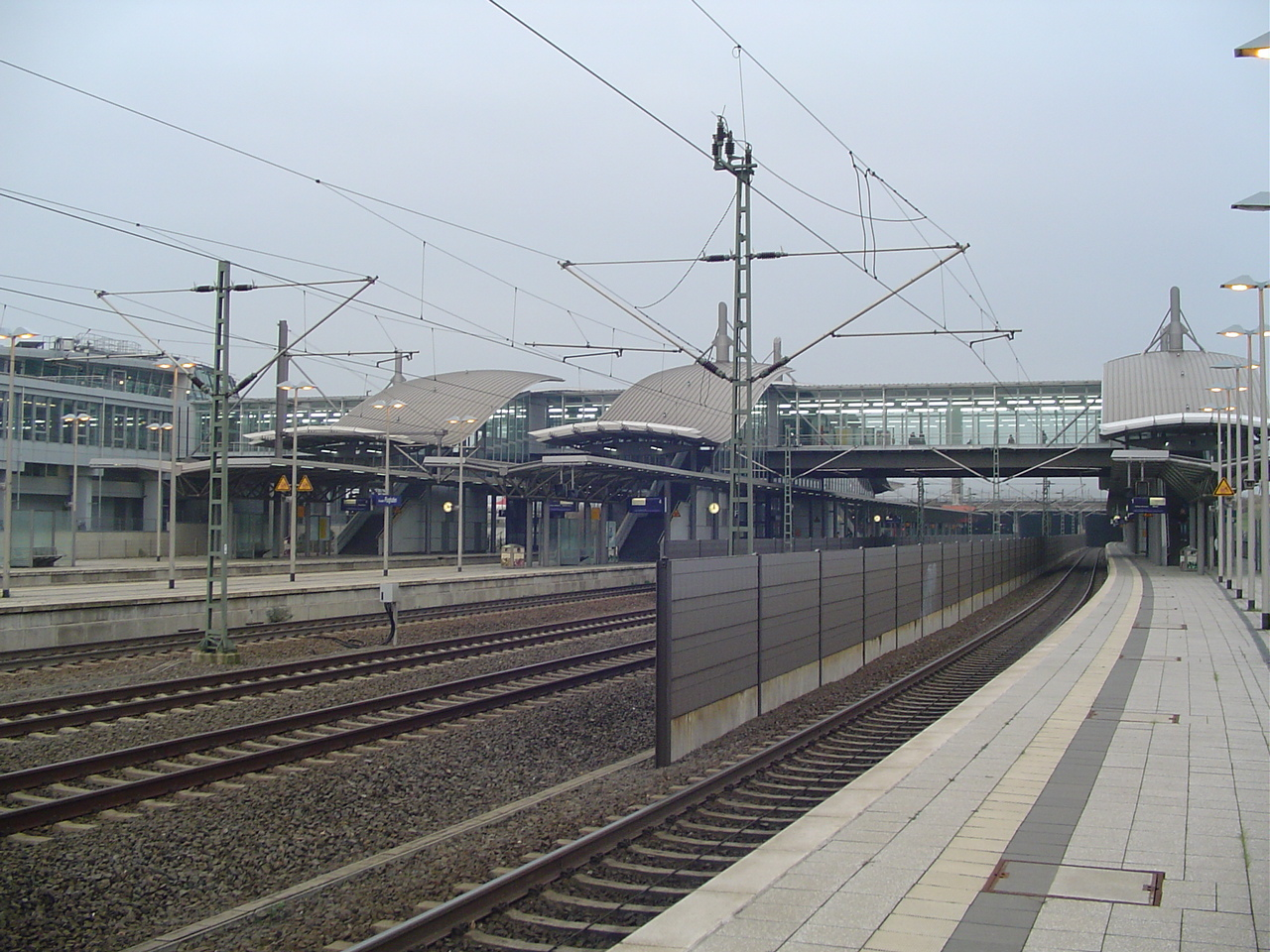
Düsseldorf Airport station

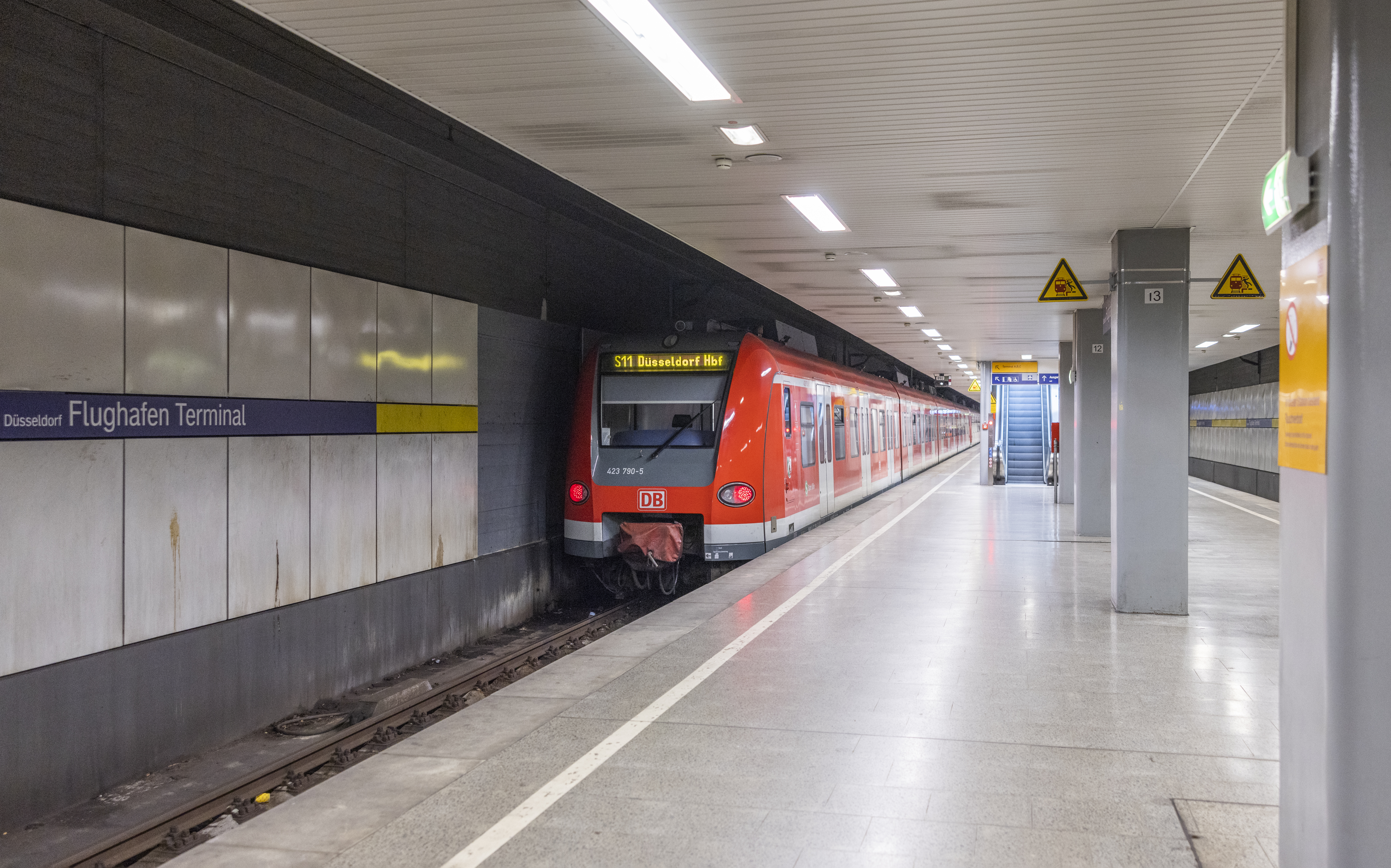
Düsseldorf Airport Terminal station

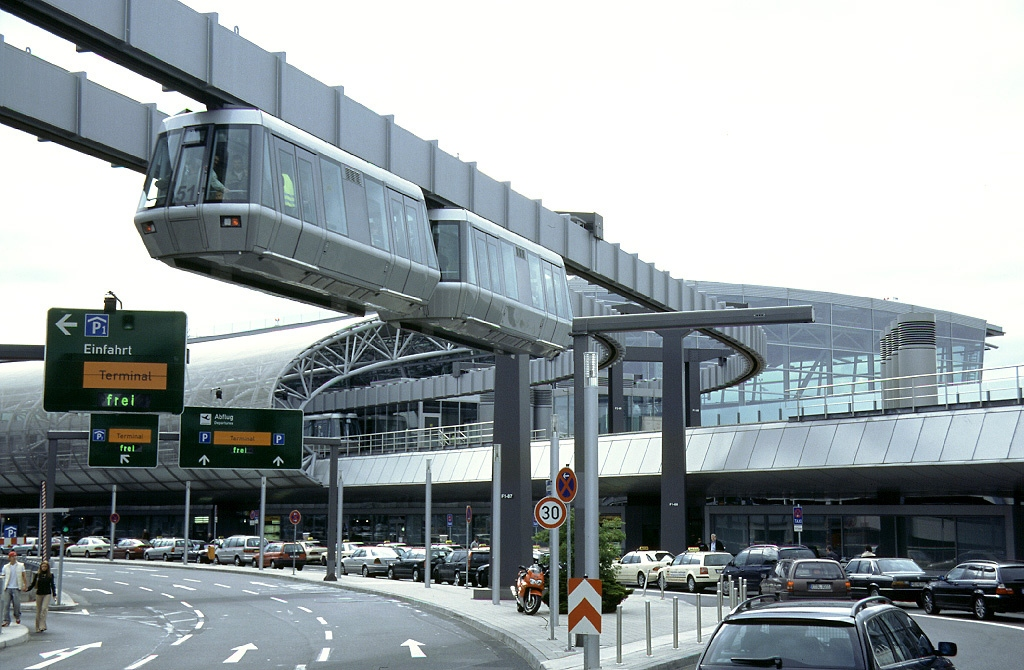
SkyTrain

=== Train ===
Düsseldorf Airport has two railway stations:

- The S-Bahn station, Düsseldorf Airport Terminal station, is located below the terminal. It is served by the S11 suburban line, which has its northern terminus there.
- The main station, Düsseldorf Airport station, is located 2.5 km (1.6 mi) from the terminal, and is served by all categories of railway, including Intercity Express (ICE) high-speed trains. A fully automatic suspended monorail called SkyTrain connects this station to the airport parking areas and the passenger terminals and also serves as an inter-terminal connection.

=== Road ===
The airport can be reached via its own motorway section which is part of the motorway A44 (Belgium – Kassel, Exit Düsseldorf-Flughafen) which also connects to motorways A52, A57 and A3. There are also several local bus lines connecting the airport with nearby areas and Düsseldorf city center.

== Other facilities ==
- Düsseldorf Airport had the headquarters of Air Berlin's technical training facilities and also served as one of their maintenance bases.
- When LTU International existed, its head office was in Halle 8 at Düsseldorf Airport.
- The corporate head office of Blue Wings was also located in Terminal A at the airport.

== Incidents and accidents ==
- On 22 December 1955, a Manx Airlines Douglas C-47 on a positioning flight crashed at DUS when attempting a visual approach, despite low clouds that suggested the use of an instrument landing system approach. The aircraft descended too low and struck trees, crashing about three miles from the runway. All three occupants were killed.
- On 3 November 1957, a Karl Herfurtner Düsseldorf Douglas C-54 crashed into a residential area 4.5 km (2.8 mi) S of DUS after takeoff due to mismanagement of the flight by the chief pilot. There were six fatalities out of the 10 on board and one killed on the ground.

== See also ==
- Transport in Germany
- Weeze Airport, an airport 80 km (50 mi) north-west from Düsseldorf, that is sometimes advertised by low-cost airlines as "Düsseldorf-Weeze" or "Weeze (Düsseldorf)". A German court ruled that naming the airport after Düsseldorf would be misleading to passengers; however, some airlines still use that name in advertisements outside Germany.
