= Ur Airlines =

Iraqi airline

IATA	ICAO	Call sign
UD	UBD	URAIR
- Founded: 2019; 7 years ago
- Hubs: Baghdad; Erbil; Najaf
- Fleet size: 2
- Destinations: 18
- Website: urairlines.com

Ur Airlines (خطوط أور الجوية) is an international airline based in Iraq. It operates a small narrow-body fleet, with its own services from Baghdad, Najaf and Erbil.

== Destinations ==
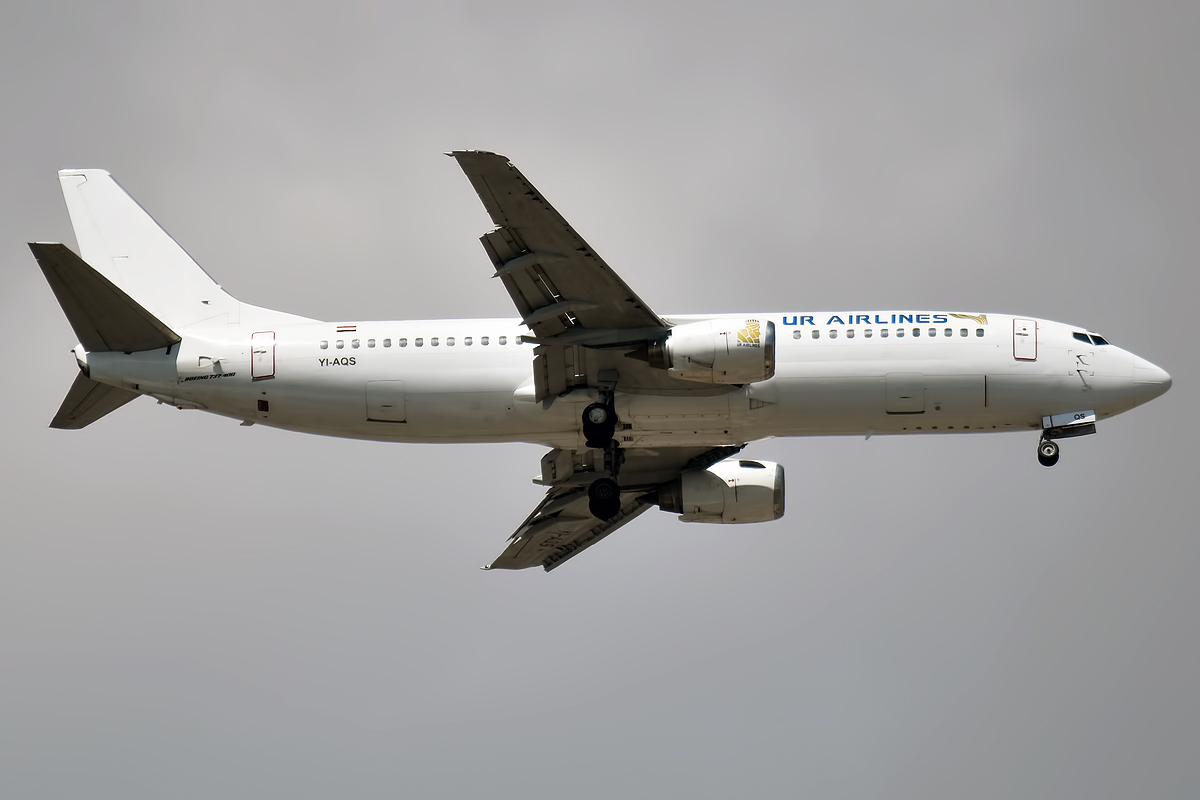
Ur Airlines Boeing 737-400 (2019)

As of July 2026, Ur Airlines operates flights to the following destinations:

City	Country	Airport	Notes
Yerevan	Armenia	Zvartnots International Airport	From Erbil
Copenhagen	Denmark	Copenhagen Airport	From Erbil
Düsseldorf	Germany	Düsseldorf Airport	From Erbil
Stuttgart	Germany	Stuttgart Airport	From Erbil
Munich	Germany	Munich Airport	From Erbil
Baghdad	Iraq	Baghdad International Airport	Hub
Erbil	Iraq	Erbil International Airport	Hub
Najaf	Iraq	Al Najaf International Airport	Hub
Beirut	Lebanon	Beirut–Rafic Hariri International Airport	From Baghdad, Erbil, and Najaf
Vilnius	Lithuania	Vilnius International Airport	From Erbil
Amsterdam	Netherlands	Amsterdam Airport Schiphol	From Erbil
Damascus	Syria	Damascus International Airport	From Baghdad and Najaf
Tunis	Tunisia	Tunis–Carthage International Airport	From Erbil
Ankara	Turkey	Esenboga Airport	From Baghdad
Antalya	Turkey	Antalya Airport	From Baghdad and Erbil
Istanbul	Turkey	Istanbul Airport	From Erbil
Istanbul	Turkey	Istanbul Sabiha Gökçen International Airport	From Baghdad
Samsun	Turkey	Samsun-Carsamba Airport	From Baghdad
Trabzon	Turkey	Trabzon Airport	From Erbil

== Fleet ==
=== Current fleet ===
As of July 2026, UR Airlines operates the following aircraft:

UR Airlines fleet
Aircraft	In service	Orders	Notes
Boeing 737-300	1	-	YI-BAU
Boeing 737-400	1	-	YI-AQS
Total	2	-	

=== Former fleet ===
As of August 2025, UR Airlines operated 1 Boeing 737-300 and 1 Boeing 737-400.

The airline also previously operated:

- Boeing 737-400 (UR-CQW, 4L-AAK — both returned to lessors)
- 2 Airbus A320-232 (LZ-BHM and LZ-DBT returned to lessors)
