= Baghdad International Airport =

Airport in Iraq

Baghdad International Airport مطار بغداد الدولي
- IATA: BGW; ICAO: ORBI

Summary
- Airport type: Public / Military
- Operator: Iraqi Government
- Location: Baghdad, Iraq
- Opened: January 1970 (Original) 1982 (Current 3 Terminals)
- Hub for: Iraqi Airways; Fly Baghdad; Ur Airlines; Al-Burhan Airways
- Elevation AMSL: 114 ft (35 m)
- Coordinates: 33°15′45″N 44°14′04″E
- Website: baghdadairport.gov.iq

Maps
- Location of airport in Iraq
- Interactive map of Baghdad International Airport

Runways
Direction	Length		Surface
Direction	ft	m	Surface
15R/33L	10,830	3,301	Concrete
15L/33R	13,123	4,000	Concrete

Statistics (2022)
- Passengers: 2,646,351
- Aircraft operations: 32,549
- Source: ICAA, COSIT.

Baghdad International Airport (IATA: BGW, ICAO: ORBI) (Arabic: مطار بغداد الدولي, romanized: Maṭār Baġdād ad-Dawaliyy), previously known as Saddam International Airport (IATA: SDA, ICAO: ORBS) is an international airport serving Baghdad, the capital of Iraq. It is located in a suburb about 16 km (9.9 mi) west of the downtown in the Baghdad Governorate. Currently, it is the largest and busiest airport in Iraq, with approximately 8 million passengers annually, offering flights to more than 35 destinations.

The construction of today's three terminals began in 1979, under the regime of Saddam Hussein. However, the inauguration of the airport was delayed during the Iran–Iraq War. The airport was opened in 1982. It ceased commercial operations after sanctions were imposed against Iraq during the Gulf War. Only a few planes operated, mainly carrying humanitarian aid. On 17 August 2000, the airport reopened with commercial flights from Jordan, Syria and Lebanon. During the invasion of Iraq in 2003, the airport was the scene of heavily intense fighting between the United-States-led coalition forces and the Iraqi military. The airport thereafter fell in control of coalition forces and was closed for renovation. It later adopted its current name and resumed operations. The airport and surrounding vicinity were subjected to attacks and site of clashes between militants and U.S. forces.

== History ==
Baghdad West Aerodrome, which would later be known as Al-Muthanna Airport, was the first principal airport of Baghdad.

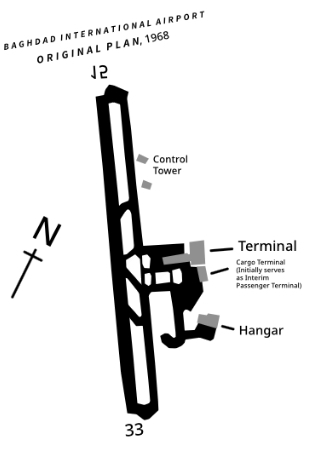
A recreation of a diagram of the then under construction Baghdad International Airport in 1968.

The new airport was to be located 10 and a half miles southwest of the Al Muthanna Airport.

Work began on the airport in August 1965 due to the older Baghdad West Airport declining in passenger numbers due to its lack of facilities, and the runway (now Runway 15R/33L) and apron had been completed by early 1966. An interim passenger building was to be completed initially, before the construction of a larger airport terminal, and when the new terminal would be completed, the interim terminal would be converted into a cargo terminal. Originally, the airport was supposed to be completed by 1968. The airport cost £15-20 million.

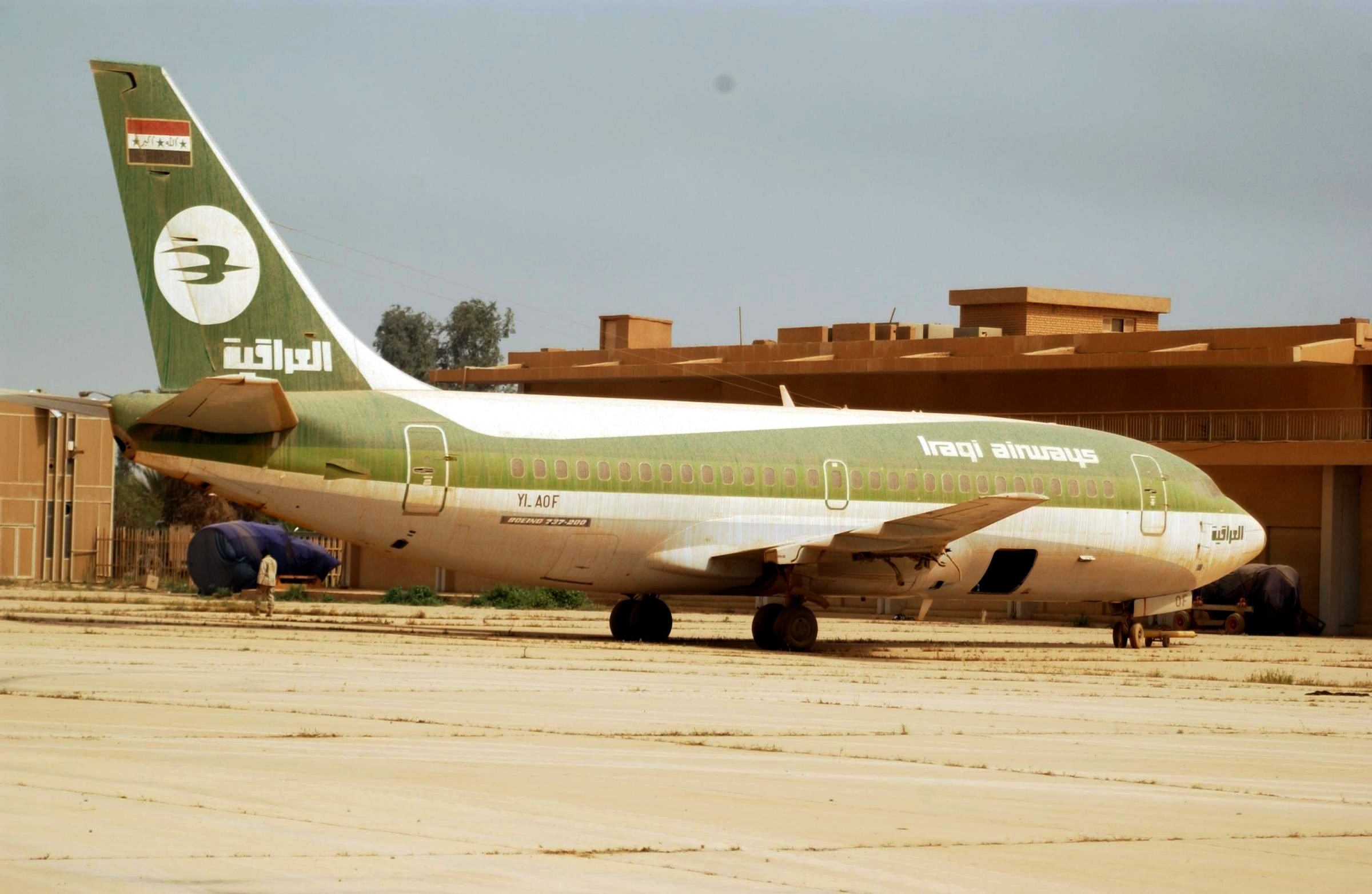
An Iraqi Airways 737-200 parked in front of the old interim terminal in 2008.

The interim terminal contained a restaurant and 2 floors, airline offices, a combined transit and departure lounge, an arrival lounge, customs’ halls and a large concourse. At ground level, the terminal had an area of 43,000 square feet.

The newer terminal was to have a single pier handling 8 aircraft, and the interim terminal, now a cargo terminal would have 5 extra aircraft parking stands next to it. The airport complex was to have 25 buildings and facilities, such as the main terminal, the Iraqi Airways headquarters, the control and communications building, and the cargo terminal once the plan would be fully completed. The control and communications building was to be located 3,300 feet northwest of the terminal. It would be a two-story building with a central tower containing the control room. The HQ of Iraqi Airways was to have 8 floors consisting largely of offices and two single-story units, one of which containing a staff canteen and kitchen while the other having welfare facilities. A massive hangar built for Iraqi Airways would be built, it would be built from reinforced concrete with giant cantilever beams and have an area of 54,000 square feet. It would have multiple workshops and stores together with all the necessary process shops for the maintenance and servicing of modern aircraft. An Iraqi Airways operations wing would also be built as a two story building. Meanwhile, a 3 lane highway was built to access the airport and the entire project was the responsibility of the Iraqi Director-General of Roads and Bridges. All of these facilities would make the airport capable of being one of the best in the Middle East.

Sir Basil Spence designed the never built permanent terminal with 8 gates as a Consultant Architect for the engineering firm Sir Alexander Gibb & Partners.

A Romanian state enterprise, Technoexport, was involved in performing all the main contract work other than the radio installations and the electronics.

The plans for the permanent terminal with 1 pier with 8 aircraft gates was cancelled and shelved, but the original illustrations of both the interim terminal and the terminal are archived. The illustrations were made in 1967. The building would have been a rectangular block with a huge canopy porch and large pyramid-shaped skylights. A distinctive crescent-shaped sculptural motif with square-patterned tiles on its underside was planned for the roof. Spence was interested in adapting ancient forms of Sumerian writing to achieve a texture on the walls of the airport. He wanted the interior to be largely of luxurious marble stone but by 1969 was concerned that due to spiralling costs this might have to be abandoned in favour of local materials.

=== Opening ===
Contrary to popular belief, in January 1970, the airport opened as Baghdad International Airport with one 10,827 foot concrete runway (now 15R/33L).

The airport handled 26 airlines in 1978 and was the main base of Iraqi Airways, the IATA code was BGW and the ICAO code was ORBB.

=== Expansion ===
The new terminals were developed under a consortium led by French company Spie Batignolles under an agreement made in 1979. The Iran–Iraq War delayed full opening of the new airport terminals until 1982. It was renamed as Saddam International Airport, bearing the name of then-President of Iraq Saddam Hussein.

Closer to Baghdad than the older runway, a new runway, 15L/33R begun construction with a length of 13,123 feet or 4,000 meters.

The access road to the interim terminal was partially demolished so that Runway 15L/33R could be built.

Most of Baghdad's civilian flights stopped in 1991, when the United Nations imposed restrictions on Iraq after its invasion of Kuwait. After the Persian Gulf War, a no-fly zone imposed on Iraq by the United States and the United Kingdom meant that Iraqi Airways was only able to continue domestic flights for limited periods. Occasional international charter flights carrying medicine, aid workers, and government officials were allowed into Baghdad. Royal Jordanian Airlines operated regular flights from Amman to Baghdad.

On August 17, 2000, the airport was officially opened to civilian flights. Minister of Transport Ahmad Murtada said that:

And we are expecting the arrival of aircraft. The embargo has prevented Iraqi citizens from using the airport for 10 years. There is no international resolution banning flights to Iraq. It is a US-British-Zionist decision that is neither lawful, humane nor fair.

— Ahmed Murtada

=== 2003–2005 (U.S. occupation) ===
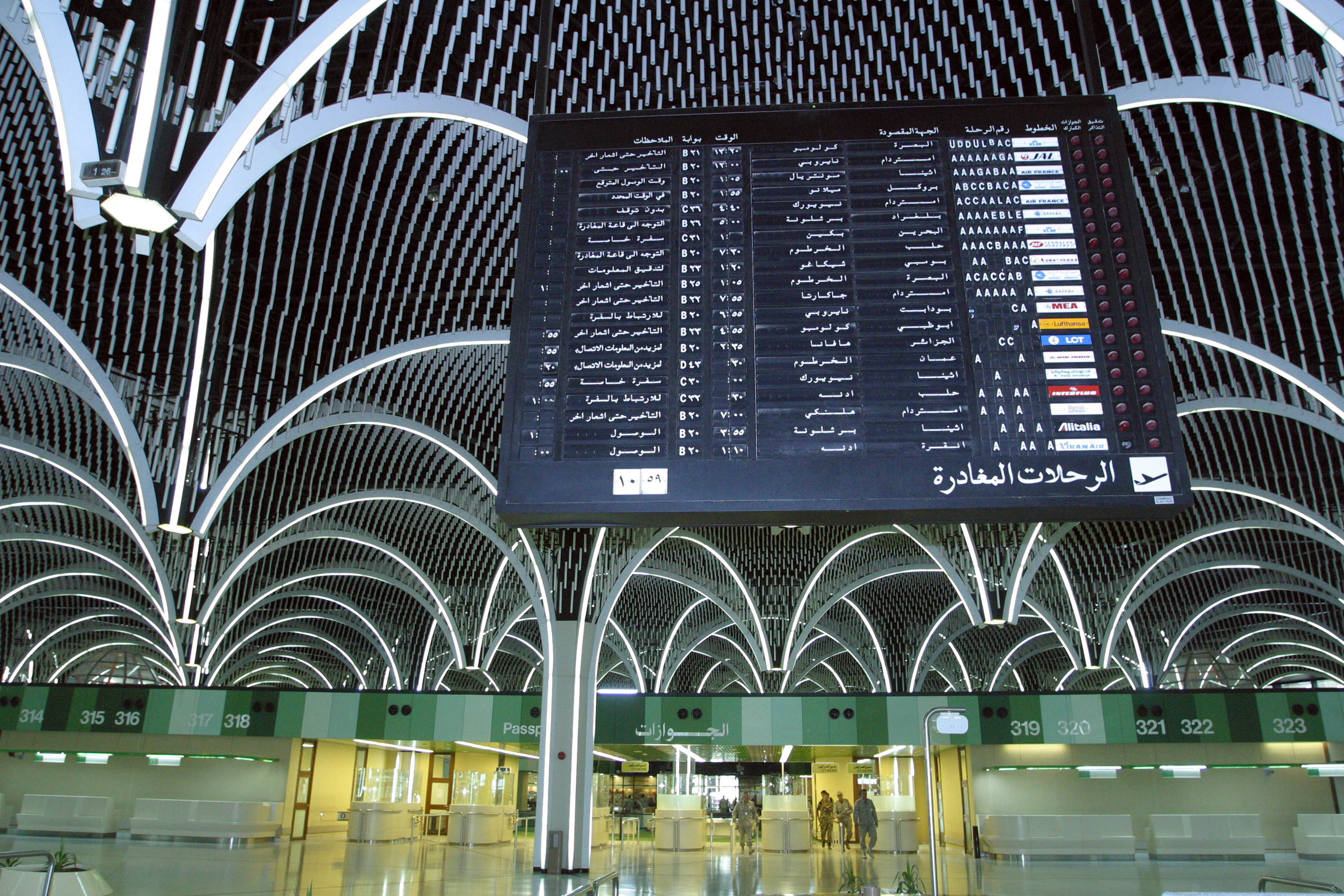
Inside view of the deserted Samarra Blue terminal 3 terminal in 2003, showing a nonfunctional FIDS (note the red and white icon for the long-defunct East German airline Interflug on the fourth row from the bottom, a legacy of the invasion of Kuwait), in front of empty check-in desks and passport control

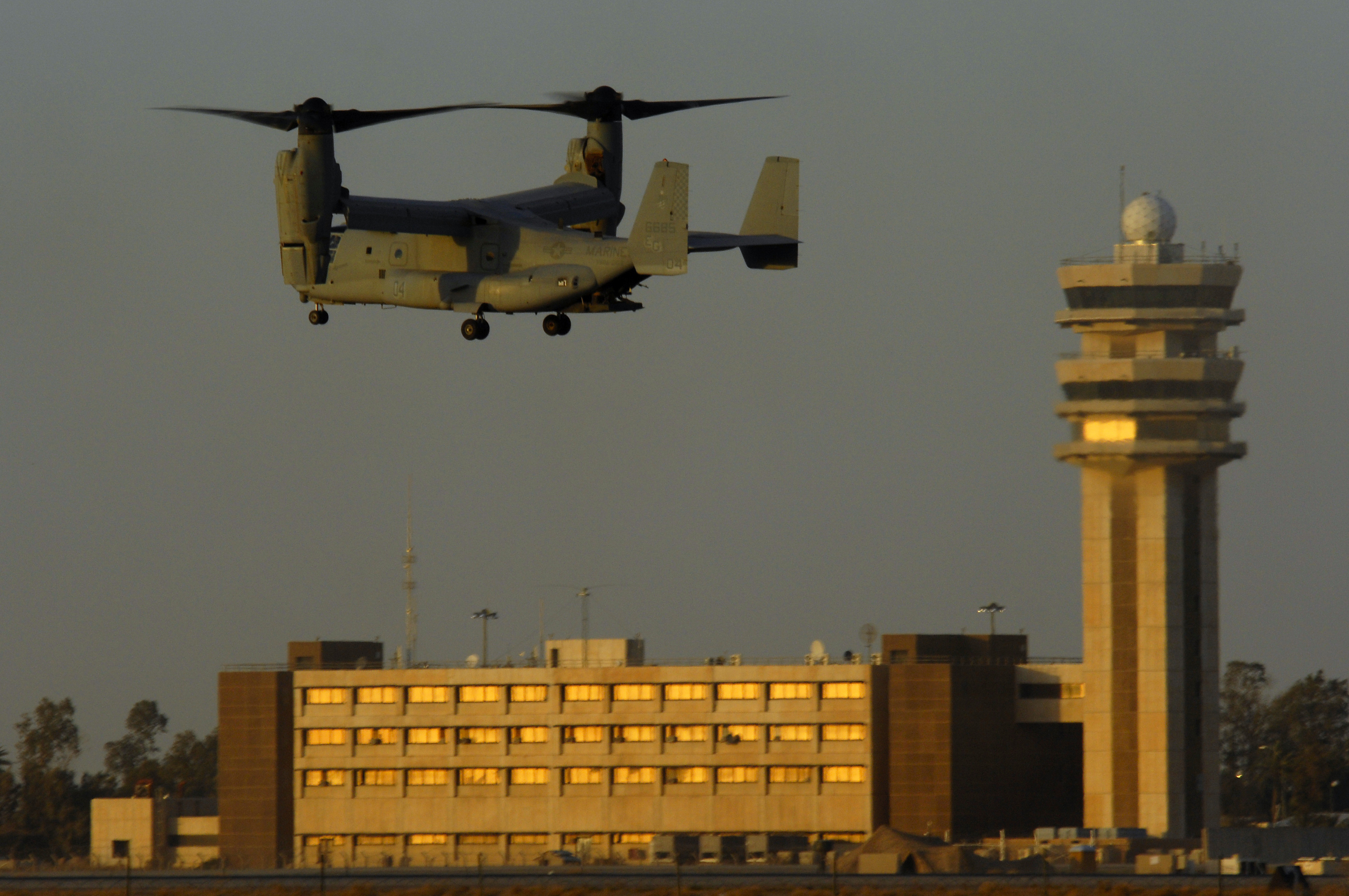
A military helicopter flying over the airport, 2008

In 2003, United States-led Coalition forces invaded Iraq. In early April, they moved into Baghdad, took control of the airport, and changed its name to the original name of the airport, Baghdad International Airport. The ICAO code for the airport consequently changed from ORBS to ORBI. The IATA code also changed from SDA to BGW, which had previously referred to all Baghdad airports, and before that to Al Muthana Airport when Saddam Hussein was in power.

In July 2003, the airport resumed civilian flights for the first time since 1991.

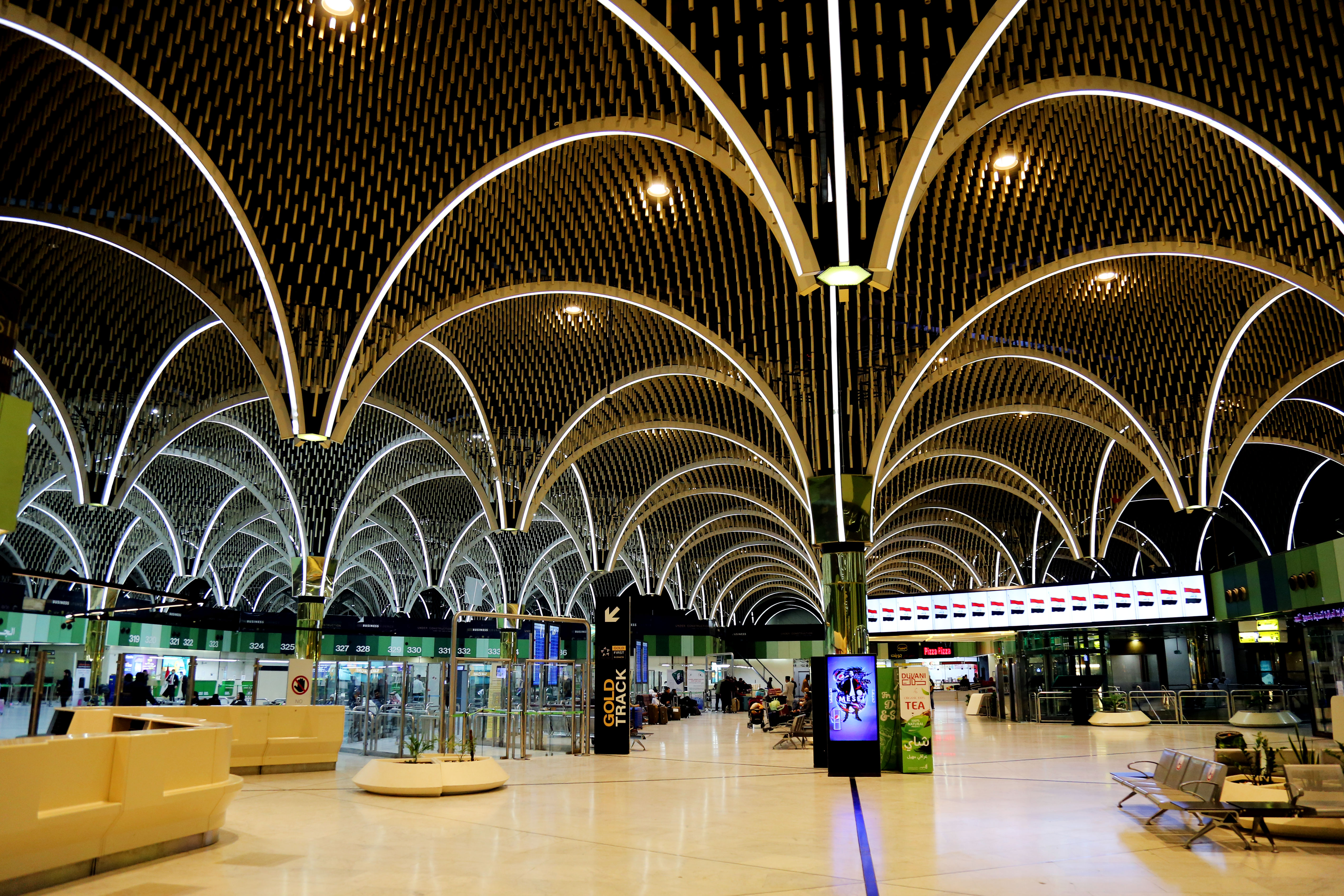
Babylon Terminal, Baghdad International Airport in 2022

Civilian control of the airport was returned to the Iraqi Government from the Coalition Provisional Authority in 2004.

=== 2005–2011 ===
Sather Air Base – the American base on the west side of the airport – came under periodic rocket fire from Baghdad. On 6 December 2006, a 107mm rocket attack landed 30 yards (27 meters) from a parked C-5A aircraft, puncturing it with scores of shrapnel holes.

Terminal C was refreshed with three active gate areas for carriers operating from the airport.

Sather Air Base was renamed to the "Baghdad Diplomatic Support Center" in December 2011 when the United States Department of State took over operations after the withdrawal of United States troops.

=== 2012-Present ===
Baghdad Airport Road, connecting the airport to the Green Zone, once a dangerous route full of IEDs, was refurbished in 2014 with palm trees, manicured lawns, and a fountain, with Turkish assistance.

Since the end of the war, the region surrounding the airport alongside the Airport Road, has emerged as an investment destination in Baghdad.

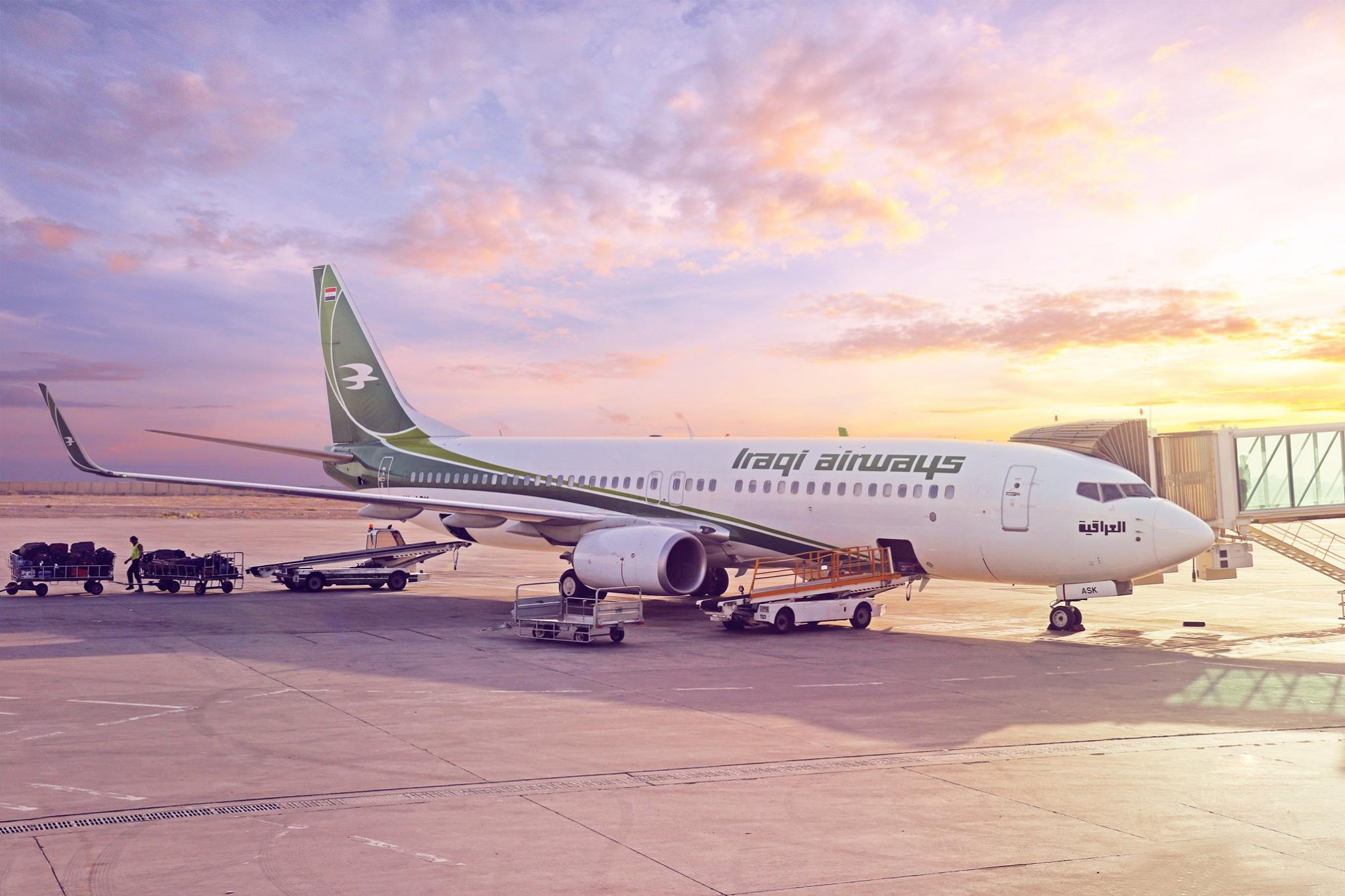

On 6 March 2026, during the 2026 Iran war, a drone attack targeted the airport complex.

During the 2026 Iran war the U.S. Baghdad Diplomatic Support Center came under attack. On March 10 and 28, 2026, there were reports of drone strikes next to a guard tower and other areas on site. On April 9, 2026, drone strikes were reported near Baghdad International Airport and BDSC.

== Military use ==
A separate enclave within the airport houses the New Al Muthana Air Base, where the Iraqi Air Force's 23rd Squadron is based, operating three Lockheed C-130E Hercules transport aircraft. The base is also home to a number of Sukhoi Su-25 attack aircraft.

Sather Air Base, or Camp Sather, was a United States Air Force base on the west side of the airport from 2003 to 2011. The primary task of the base was to "maintain and operate the airfield and the aerial port," bringing in people and cargo. It had an active passenger terminal. It was named in memory of Combat Controller Staff Sergeant Scott Sather, the first enlisted airman to die in Operation Iraqi Freedom. Sather was awarded the Bronze Star Medal with Valor for his leadership during the initial stages of the 2003 U.S. invasion.

After the U.S. withdrawal in 2011 it was renamed as the Baghdad Diplomatic Support Center and transferred to the United States State Department. At this time there were only a few hundred US service members left at the base. In 2014 it housed 41 agencies, which had roughly 1,600 personnel.

Attacks in 2023 were connected to the war in Gaza.

== Airport developments ==
On 18 May 2010, plans were unveiled for an expansion of Baghdad International Airport, doubling its capacity to 15 million passengers per year. The expansion, to be funded by foreign investors, was to include construction of three new terminals and refurbishment of the existing three, each of which would accommodate 2.5 million passengers annually.

== Airlines and destinations ==
=== Passenger ===
Airlines	Destinations
Aegean Airlines	Athens
Air Arabia	Sharjah
AJet	Ankara, Istanbul–Sabiha Gökçen
ATA Airlines	Mashhad, Tehran–Imam Khomeini (all flights suspended)
Azerbaijan Airlines	Baku
Basra Airlines	Istanbul
Caspian Airlines	Tehran–Imam Khomeini (suspended)
Egyptair	Cairo
Emirates	Dubai–International
Eurowings	Seasonal: Berlin (begins 10 December 2026), Düsseldorf (begins 14 December 2026)
Fly Cham	Damascus
Fly Baghdad	Istanbul, Karachi, Lahore
flydubai	Dubai–International
Gulf Air	Bahrain
Iran Airtour	Mashhad, Tehran–Imam Khomeini (all flights suspended)
Iran Aseman Airlines	Tehran–Imam Khomeini (suspended)
Iraqi Airways	Ahmedabad, Amman–Queen Alia, Ankara, Antalya, Baku, Basra, Beijing–Capital, Beirut, Berlin, Cairo, Delhi, Dubai–International, Düsseldorf, Erbil, Frankfurt, Guangzhou, Isfahan, Islamabad, Istanbul, Istanbul–Sabiha Gökçen, Karachi, Kirkuk, Kish, Kuala Lumpur–International, Kuwait City, Mashhad, Moscow–Vnukovo, Mosul, Mumbai, Munich, Muscat, Najaf, Nasiriyah, Samsun, Sharjah, Sulaimaniyah, Tehran–Imam Khomeini, Tunis; Seasonal: Hurghada, Jeddah, Medina, Sharm El Sheikh, Trabzon
Jordan Aviation	Amman–Queen Alia
Mahan Air	Mashhad, Tehran–Imam Khomeini (all flights suspended)
Meraj Airlines	Mashhad, Tehran–Imam Khomeini (all flights suspended)
Middle East Airlines	Beirut
Nile Air	Cairo; Seasonal: Sharm El Sheikh
Pars Air	Mashhad
Pegasus Airlines	Istanbul–Sabiha Gökçen
Qatar Airways	Doha
Qeshm Air	Tehran–Imam Khomeini (suspended)
Royal Jordanian	Amman–Queen Alia
SalamAir	Copenhagen, Muscat
Sepehran Airlines	Mashhad, Tehran–Imam Khomeini (all flights suspended)
Taban Air	Kish, Mashhad, Tehran–Imam Khomeini (all flights suspended)
Turkish Airlines	Istanbul; Seasonal: Antalya
UR Airlines	Ankara, Antalya, Beirut, Damascus, Istanbul–Sabiha Gökçen, Samsun
Varesh Airlines	Mashhad, Tehran–Imam Khomeini (all flights suspended)
Zagros Airlines	Tehran–Imam Khomeini (suspended)

=== Cargo ===
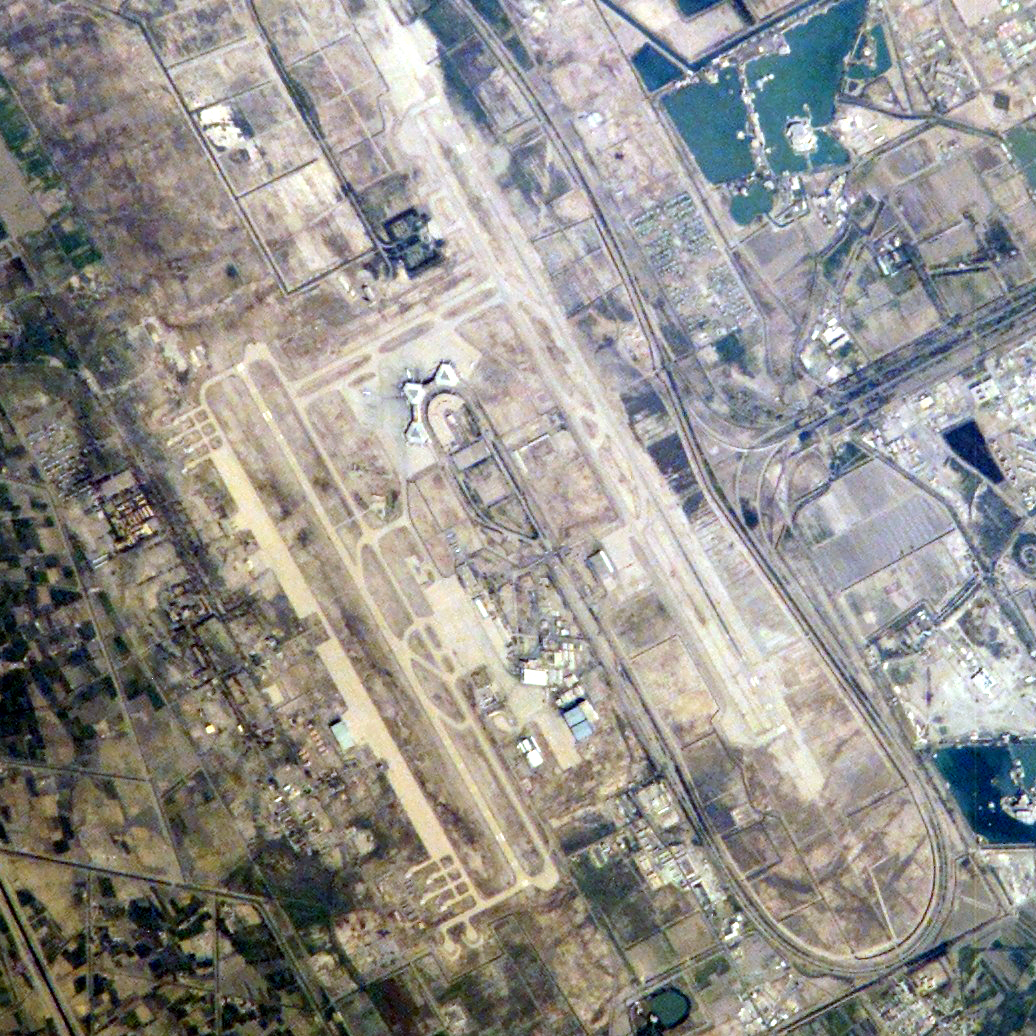
Aerial view of Baghdad International Airport

Airlines	Destinations
Coyne Airways	Dubai–International
EgyptAir Cargo	Cairo
Silk Way Airlines	Baku
DHL Aviation	Bahrain

== Statistics ==
Year	Passengers		Cargo		Aircraft operations	
Year	Total	%YoY	Tons	%YoY	Movements	%YoY
2015	1,898,589	N.D.	11,657.5	N.D.	19,952	N.D.
2016	1,787,247	▼5.9%	18,903.1	▲62.2%	16,858	▼15.5%
2017	3,507,910	▲96.3%	33,254.8	▲75.9%	31,342	▲85.1%
2018	3,909,709	▲11.5%	11,027.0	▼66.8%	37,751	▲20.4%
2019	3,778,578	▼3.5%	12,057.7	▲9.3%	37,265	▼1.3%
2020	928,876	▼75.4%	6,105.3	▼49.4%	11,301	▼69.7%
2021	2,071,150	▲123.0%	7,346.7	▲20.3%	23,678	▲109.5%
2022	2,915,052	▲40.7%	8,803.3	▲19.8%	32,549	▲37.5%

Source: COSIT. Air Transport Activity Statistics, years 2015, 2016, 2017, 2018, 2019, 2020, 2021 and 2022.

Historical Statistics from “Airports of the World”.

Year	Passengers (Terminal)	Cargo (tonnes)	Transport Movements
1970	200,998	3,457	6,402
1975	605,052	17,750	10,674
1976	822,951	14,124	14,739
1977	1,007,000*	15,568	14,505

*Rounded figure

== Incidents and accidents ==
- In February 1991, five aircraft, comprising three Iraqi Government executive jets, plus two Iraqi Airways Tupolev Tu-124Vs (YI-AEL and YI-AEY), were destroyed on the ground at Saddam International Airport by US or allied bombs during the Gulf War.
- In June 2000, two Saudi former military officers boarded a plane bound for London and diverted it to Baghdad. They wanted to claim asylum in Iraq, but Iraqi authorities later deported them to Saudi Arabia.
- On 22 November 2003, a European Air Transport Airbus A300B4 freighter, registered OO-DLL, operating on behalf of DHL Aviation, was hit by an SA-14 'Grail' missile shortly after takeoff. The airplane lost hydraulic pressure, causing a loss of control. After extending the landing gear to create more drag, the crew piloted the plane using differences in engine thrust and landed the plane with minimal further damage. All three crew survived. After the incident, civilian planes took to routinely performing corkscrew landings to minimise the risk of being hit by surface weapons.
- On 26 January 2015, a Flydubai Boeing 737-800 flying from Dubai to Baghdad with 154 passengers on board was hit by small-arms fire on approach to Baghdad International Airport. The plane landed safely. One passenger was injured when at least three bullets struck the plane. After the incident, UAE carriers FlyDubai and Emirates suspended their flights from Dubai to Baghdad. Flights by Turkish Airlines and Royal Jordanian were also temporarily suspended.
- On 3 January 2020, a U.S. drone strike killed Qasem Soleimani, leader of Iran's Quds Force, and Abu Mahdi al-Muhandis, deputy commander of the Popular Mobilization Forces, as their convoy left the airport on or near Baghdad Airport Road.

== See also ==
- List of airports in Iraq
- List of the busiest airports in the Middle East
