= Fly Baghdad =

Iraqi airline

Fly Baghdad فلاي بغداد
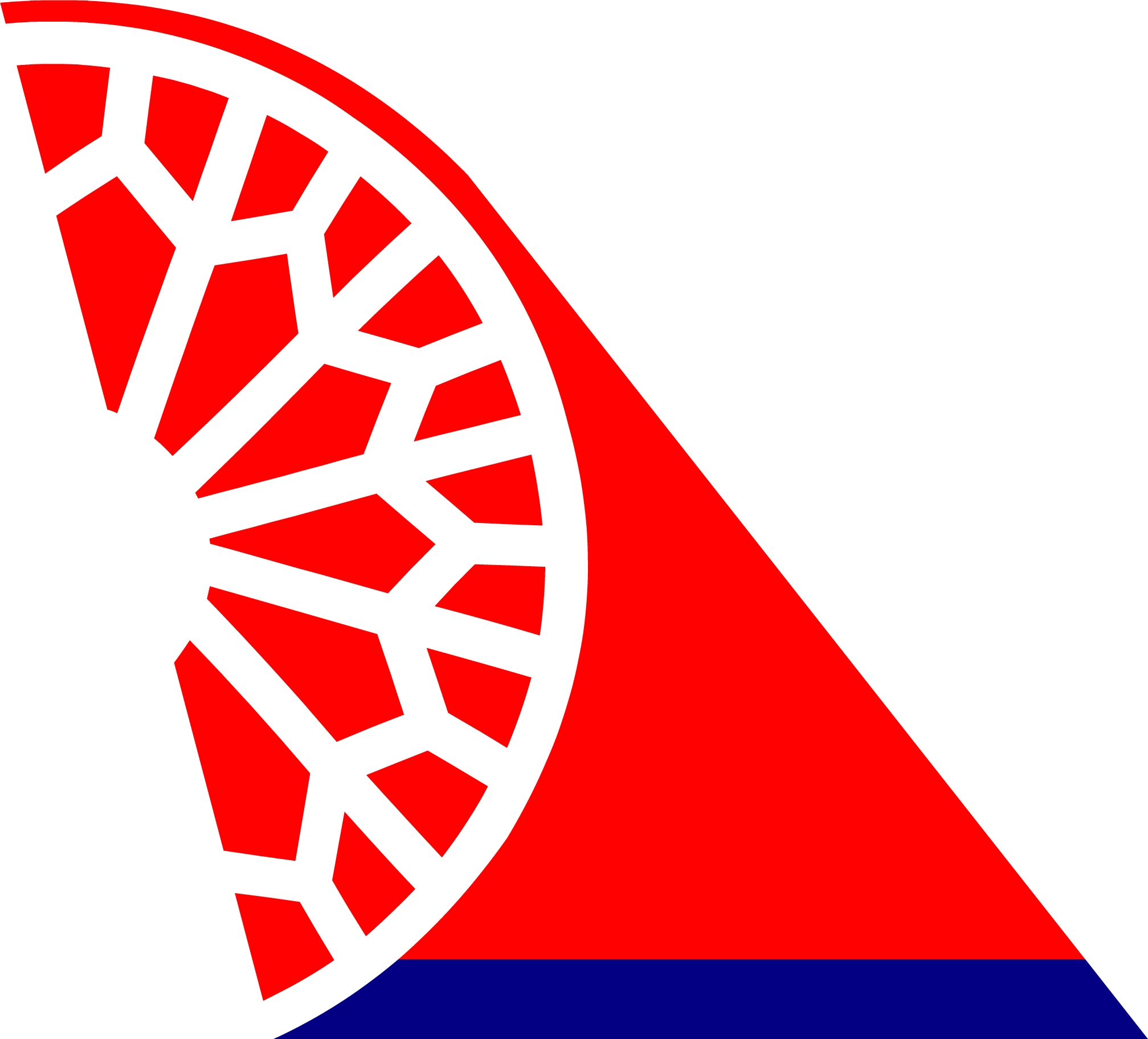

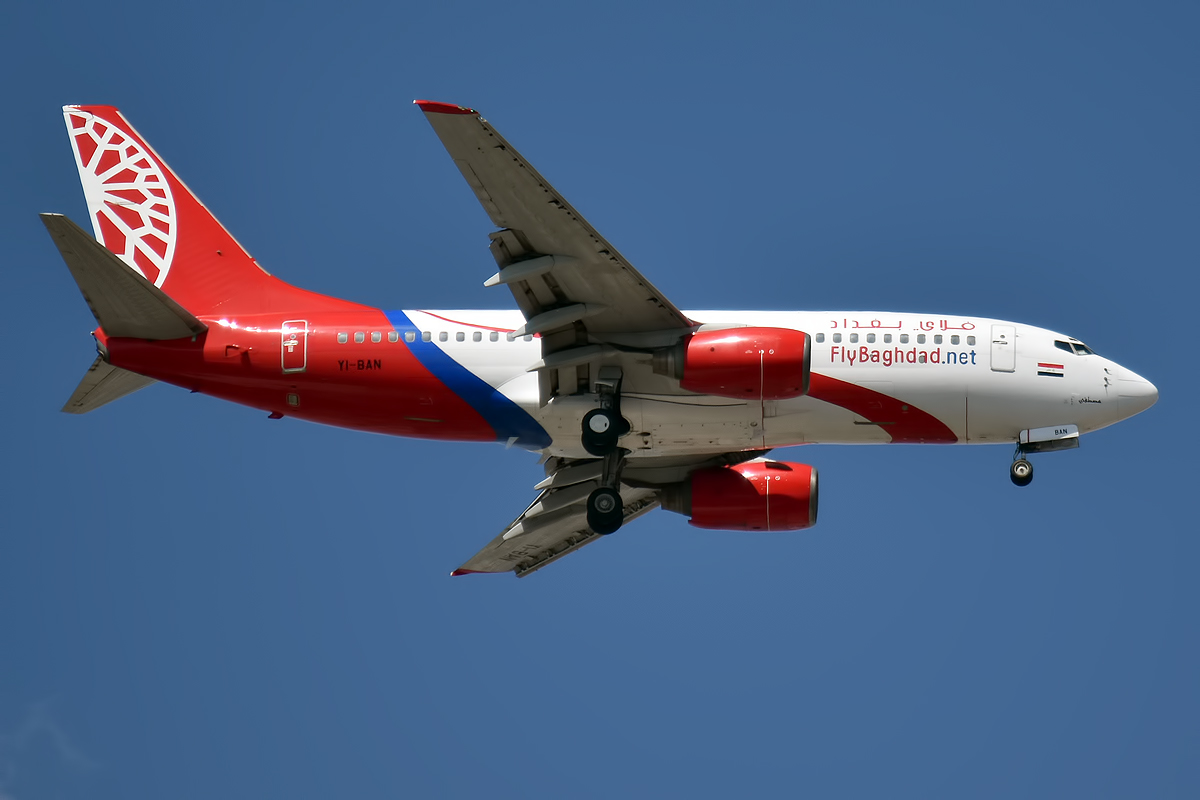
IATA	ICAO	Call sign
IF	FBA	FLY BAGHDAD
- Founded: 15 July 2014; 12 years ago
- Commenced operations: 14 February 2017; 9 years ago
- AOC #: ICAA 007
- Hubs: Baghdad International Airport
- Fleet size: 5
- Destinations: 24
- Headquarters: Baghdad International Airport, Iraq in front of Karbala terminal
- Employees: 600
- Website: www.flybaghdad.iq

Fly Baghdad is a private Iraqi airline, headquartered in Baghdad, with flights based at Baghdad International Airport. The airline restarted its operations on 14 February 2017. Fly Baghdad has 1 Boeing B737-700, 5 B737-800, 3 B737-900ER, 1 CRJ-200 and 1 CRJ-900 with an average aircraft age of approximately fifteen years. After the dissolution of old board, the new management rebuilt the company again. The company slogan is Less Price..." More Flights. Flights to the European Union have been banned in November 2023, due to safety concerns.

In January 2024, U.S. Treasury Department sanctioned Fly Baghdad and its CEO for providing assistance to Iran's Islamic Revolutionary Guards Corps and its proxy groups in Iraq, Syria, and Lebanon by transporting fighters and weapons. Fly Baghdad canceled flights on all routes and suspended operations effective 25 January 2024. Flights resumed several weeks later. On August, 5, 2026, the U.S. Department of the Treasury rescinded all sanctions it had previously levied against Fly Baghdad stating that the Airline had demonstrated "major changes" to its operations such that sanctions were no longer warranted.

On 13 December 2024, the European Union (EU) added Fly Baghdad to their list of airlines banned in the European Union.

== Destinations ==
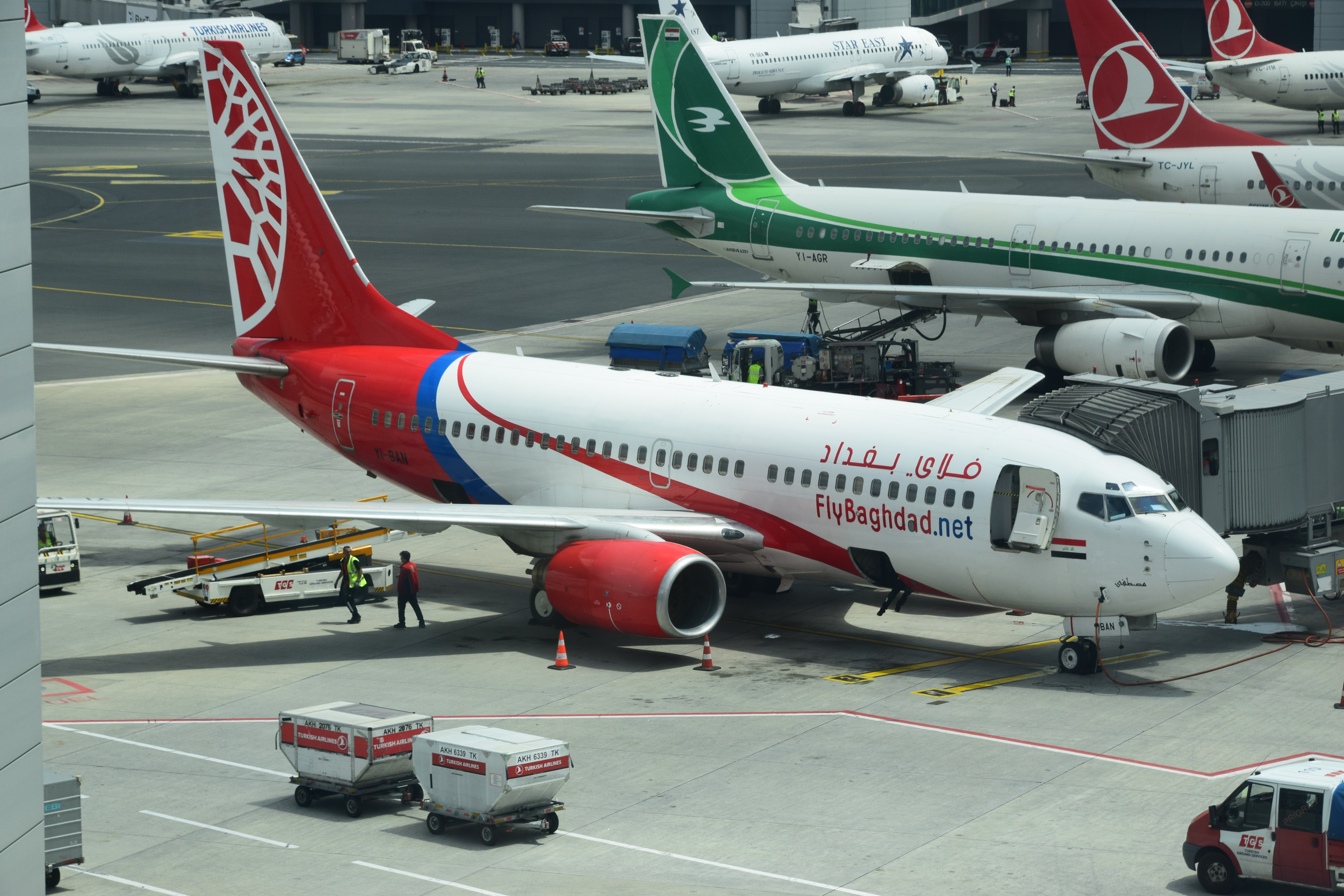
A Fly Baghdad Boeing 737-700 at Istanbul Airport, Turkey in 2023.

Fly Baghdad is flying to the following destinations:

Country	City	Airport	Notes	Refs
Armenia	Yerevan	Yerevan International Airport		
Azerbaijan	Baku	Heydar Aliyev International Airport		
Belarus	Minsk	Minsk National Airport	Terminated	
Egypt	Cairo	Cairo International Airport		
Georgia	Tbilisi	Shota Rustaveli Tbilisi International Airport		
India	Ahmedabad	Ahmedabad Airport		
India	Mumbai	Chhatrapati Shivaji Maharaj International Airport		
India	New Delhi	Indira Gandhi International Airport		
Iran	Mashhad	Mashhad International Airport		
Iran	Tehran	Imam Khomeini International Airport		
Iraq	Baghdad	Baghdad International Airport	Base	
Iraq	Basra	Basra International Airport		
Iraq	Erbil	Erbil International Airport		
Iraq	Najaf	Al Najaf International Airport		
Jordan	Amman	Queen Alia International Airport		
Lebanon	Beirut	Beirut–Rafic Hariri International Airport		
Malaysia	Kuala Lumpur	Kuala Lumpur International Airport		
Russia	Moscow	Vnukovo International Airport		
Saudi Arabia	Medina	Prince Mohammad bin Abdulaziz International Airport		
Syria	Aleppo	Aleppo International Airport		
Syria	Damascus	Damascus International Airport		
Tunisia	Tunis	Tunis–Carthage International Airport		
Turkey	Ankara	Ankara Esenboğa Airport		
Turkey	Antalya	Antalya Airport		
Turkey	Istanbul	Istanbul Airport		
Turkey	Istanbul	Istanbul Sabiha Gökçen International Airport		
United Arab Emirates	Dubai	Dubai International Airport		
Pakistan	Karachi	Jinnah International Airport		

== Fleet ==
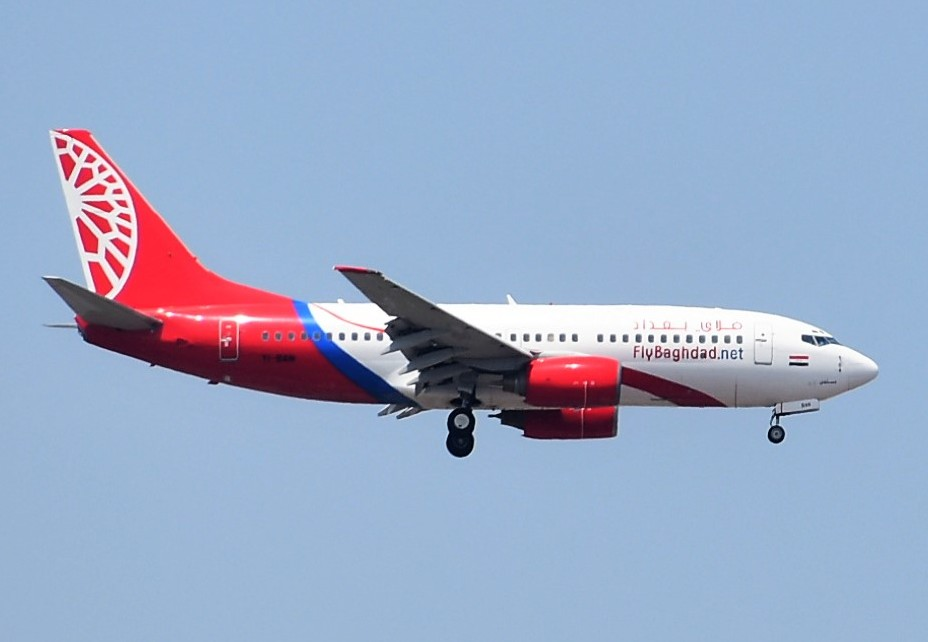
Fly Baghdad Boeing 737

=== Current fleet ===
As of July 2026, Fly Baghdad operates the following aircraft:

Fly Baghdad fleet
Aircraft	In service	Order	Passengers
Boeing 737-700	1	—	148
Boeing 737-800	5	—	189
Boeing 737-900ER	3	—	215
Beechcraft 1900D	1	—	
Bombardier CRJ200ER	1	—	50
Total	5	—	

=== Former fleet ===
As of August 2025, Fly Baghdad operated 1 Boeing 737-700, 1 Boeing 737-800, 1 Boeing 737-900ER, 1 Bombardier CRJ 200 and 1 Bombardier CRJ900.

Fly Baghdad also previously operated the following aircraft:

- 4 further Boeing 737-800
