= List of accidents and incidents involving the Boeing 737 =

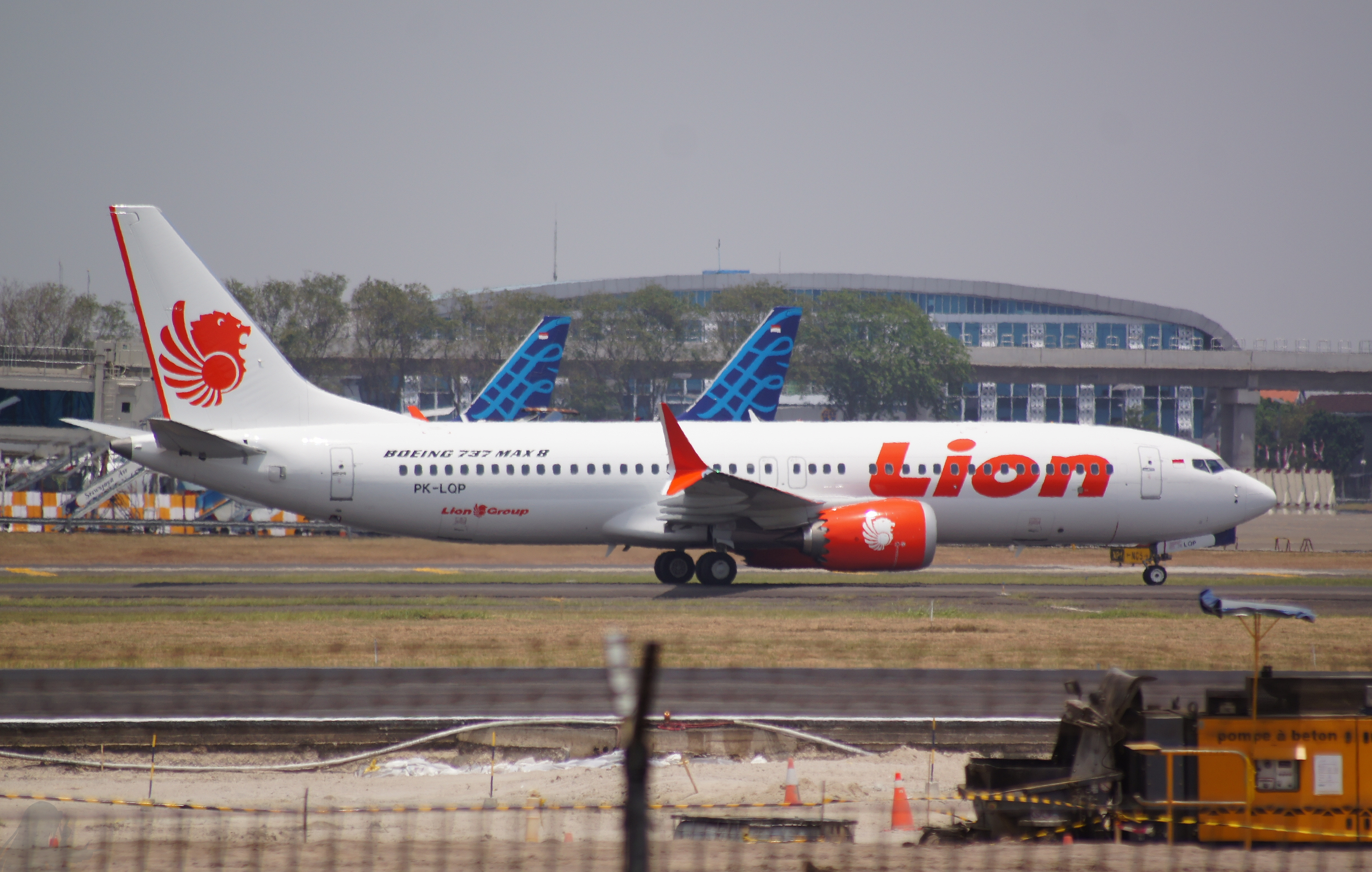
Lion Air Flight 610 is the deadliest accident involving a Boeing 737 aircraft.

The following is a list of accidents and incidents involving the Boeing 737 family of jet airliners, including the Boeing 737 Original (-100/-200), Boeing 737 Classic (-300/-400/-500), Boeing 737 Next Generation (-600/-700/-800/-900) and Boeing 737 MAX (-8/-9) series of aircraft. As of February 2024, there have been a total of 529 aviation accidents and incidents involving all 737 aircraft (not all are notable enough for inclusion on this list), which have resulted in a total of 5,779 fatalities and 234 hull losses.

The 737 first entered airline service in February 1968; the 10,000th aircraft entered service in March 2018. The first accident involving a 737 was on July 19, 1970, when a 737-200 was damaged beyond repair during an aborted takeoff, with no fatalities; the first fatal accident occurred on December 8, 1972, when United Airlines Flight 553 crashed while attempting to land, with 45 (43 on board plus 2 on the ground) fatalities; and, as of February 2024, Lion Air Flight 610, a 737 MAX 8, has the most fatalities aboard a 737 when it crashed into the Java Sea shortly after takeoff on October 29, 2018, with 189 fatalities.

== 737 Original (-100/-200) ==
=== 1970s ===
- July 19, 1970 – United Air Lines Flight 611, a new 737-200 registered as N9005U, named City of Bristol, was damaged beyond economical repair after an aborted take off at Philadelphia International Airport. During take off, a loud "bang" was heard, and the aircraft veered right. The captain aborted the take off, and the aircraft ran off the end of the runway, stopping 1,634 feet past its end, in a field. There were no fatalities. This was the first, non-fatal accident involving a 737.
- July 20, 1970 – Condor Flight 316, a 737-100 registered as D-ABEL, collided on approach to Reus Airport with a Piper PA-28 Cherokee. While the 737 was able to land, the Piper went down, killing all three occupants, making this the first fatal accident involving a 737.
- December 31, 1970 – At Washington National Airport, a 737-200 in preparation for a United Air Lines flight scheduled at 12:35 pm suffered a fire when its oxygen supply system was being recharged. No passengers were onboard and nobody was injured. The cabin and fuselage were damaged in the fire.
- July 5, 1972 – Pacific Southwest Airlines Flight 710, a 737-200 en route to Los Angeles was hijacked by two men who demanded $800,000 and that they be taken to the Soviet Union. In San Francisco, the aircraft was stormed and the two hijackers died along with one passenger.

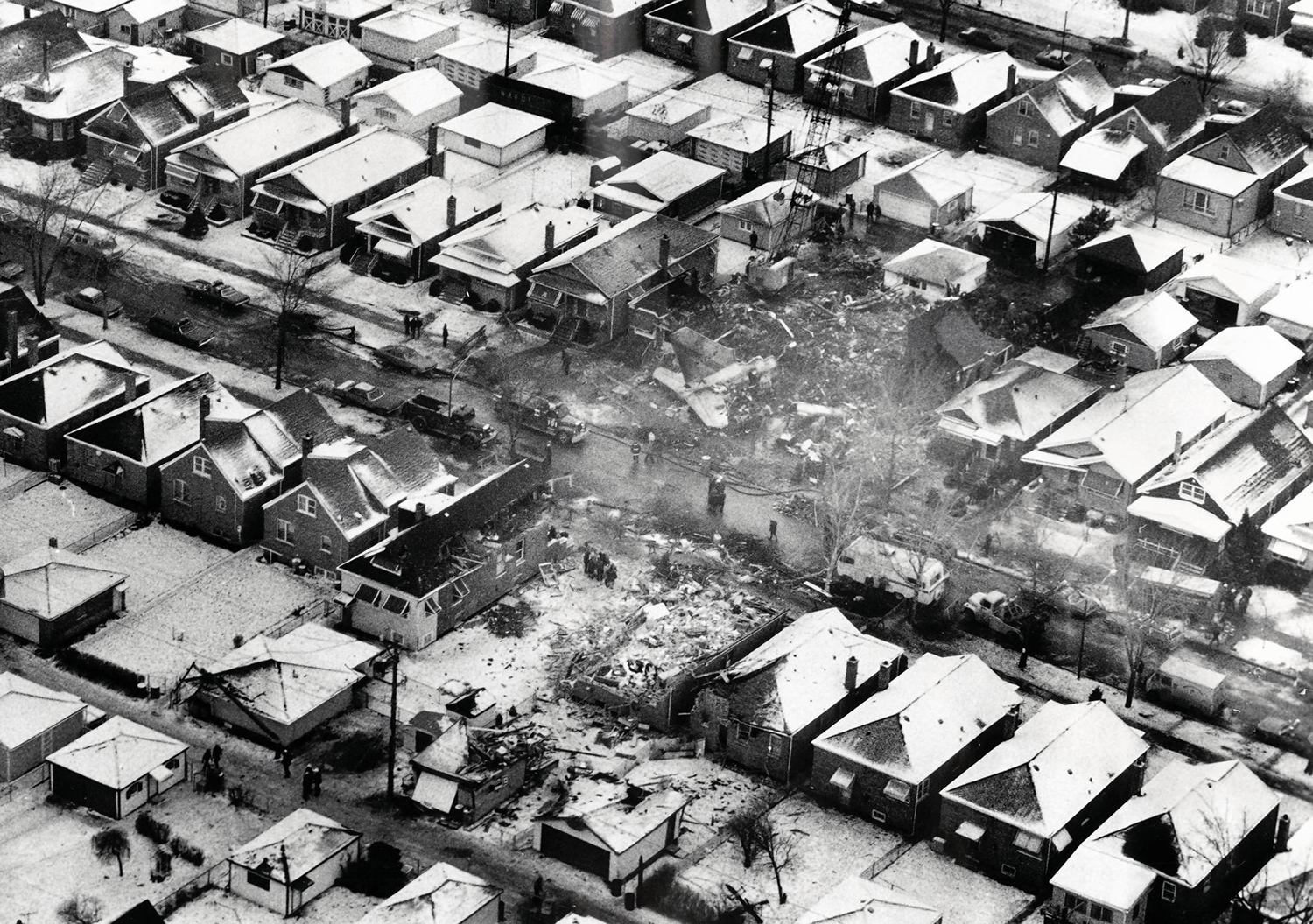
Remnants of United Air Lines Flight 553 at December 1972 crash site, the first fatal accident for a 737

- December 8, 1972 – United Air Lines Flight 553, a 737-200 registered as N9031U, crashed while attempting to land at Chicago Midway International Airport after pilot error allowed the plane to stall. Two people on the ground and 43 of the 61 passengers and crew on board died. This was the first fatal hull loss of a 737.
- May 31, 1973 – Indian Airlines Flight 440, a 737-200 registered as VT-EAM, hit power lines and crashed on approach to Palam International Airport in New Delhi, India. The cause was determined to be crew error in letting the aircraft descend below glidepath. 48 of the 65 passengers and crew on board died.
- March 31, 1975 – Western Airlines Flight 470, a 737-200 registered as N4527W, overshot a runway coated with snow at Casper/Natrona County International Airport in Casper, Wyoming in the United States. Four of the 99 aboard were injured, and the aircraft was damaged beyond repair.
- October 13, 1977 – Lufthansa Flight 181, A 737-230C registered as D-ABCE, named Landshut, was hijacked by four Palestinians, who demanded the release of seven Red Army Faction members in West German prisons and $15,000,000. The captain was fatally shot. On October 17, members of West Germany's GSG-9 stormed the aircraft and killed three of the hijackers, capturing the other.
- December 4, 1977 – Malaysian Airline System Flight 653, a 737-200 registered as 9M-MBD, crashed following a phugoid oscillation that saw the aircraft diving into a swamp after both its pilots were shot following a hijacking attempt. The crash happened in the southern Malaysian state of Johor. A total of 93 passengers and 7 crew died.
- February 11, 1978 – Pacific Western Airlines Flight 314, a 737-200 registered as C-FPWC, crashed while attempting to land at Cranbrook Airport, British Columbia, Canada. The aircraft crashed after thrust reversers did not fully stow following a go-around that was executed in order to avoid a snowplow. Four of the crew members and 38 of the 44 passengers died in the accident.
- April 26, 1979 – An Indian Airlines 737-200 was damaged by a bomb that detonated in the forward lavatory. The aircraft made a flapless landing in what was then known as Madras, now Chennai, India.

=== 1980s ===
- November 4, 1980 – a TAAG Angola Airlines 737-200 registered as D2-TAA landed short of the runway at Benguela Airport in Angola, which was followed by the collapse of the landing gear and the aircraft sliding some 900 meters afterwards; a fire broke out in the right wing but there were no reported fatalities. The aircraft caught fire again during recovery operations the next day and was written off.
- May 2, 1981 – Aer Lingus Flight 164, a 737-200, was hijacked en route from Dublin Airport, Ireland to London's Heathrow Airport, United Kingdom. While on approach to Heathrow, about five minutes before the flight was due to land, a 55-year-old Australian man went into the toilet and doused himself in petrol. He then went to the cockpit and demanded that the aircraft be diverted to Le Touquet – Côte d'Opale Airport in France, and refuel there for a flight to Tehran, Iran. Upon landing at Le Touquet and after an eight-hour standoff (during which time 11 of 112 hostages were released), French special forces stormed the aircraft and apprehended hijacker Lawrence Downey. No shots were fired and nobody was injured.
- August 22, 1981 – Far Eastern Air Transport Flight 103, a 737-222 registered as B-2603, broke apart in mid-air and crashed 14 minutes after taking off from Taipei Songshan Airport. All 104 passengers and 6 crew died.
- January 13, 1982 – Air Florida Flight 90, a 737-222 registered as N62AF, crashed in a severe snowstorm immediately after takeoff from Washington National Airport, hitting the 14th Street Bridge and fell into the ice-covered Potomac River in Washington, D.C. All but five of the 74 passengers and five crew members were killed; four motorists on the bridge also died.
- May 25, 1982 – VASP Flight 234, a Boeing 737-2A1 registered as PP-SMY, made a hard landing and touched down on its nose gear first at Brasília in rainy conditions. The gear collapsed and the aircraft skidded off the runway breaking in two. Two passengers out of 118 occupants died.
- August 26, 1982 – Southwest Air Lines Flight 611, a 737-2Q3 registered as JA8444 overran the runway at Ishigaki Airport in Japan and was destroyed. There were no fatalities but some were injured during the emergency evacuation.
- March 27, 1983 – a LAM Mozambique Airlines 737-200 registered as C9-BAB suffered an undercarriage failure after landing some 400 meters (1,300 ft) short of the runway at Quelimane Airport. There were no fatalities.
- July 11, 1983 – TAME Ecuador Flight 173, a 737-2V2 registered as HC-BIG, crashed while attempting to land at Mariscal Lamar Airport; all 111 passengers and 8 crew on board died. The cause of the accident was a controlled flight into terrain (CFIT) as a result of the pilot's inexperience with the aircraft. It remains the deadliest aviation accident in Ecuadorean history. after a radio station reported witnesses to a mid-air explosion.
- September 23, 1983 – Gulf Air Flight 771, a 737-200 registered as A4O-BK, suffered a bomb explosion in the baggage compartment causing it to stall and crash in the United Arab Emirates. All 5 crew and 107 passengers died.
- November 8, 1983 – TAAG Angola Airlines Flight 462 stalled and crashed shortly after taking off from Lubango Mukanka Airport in Angola resulting in the deaths of all its 130 occupants (126 passengers and 4 crew) on board. Local guerilla force UNITA claimed it had brought the aircraft down with a Surface-to-air missile.
- February 9, 1984 – A TAAG Angola Airlines 737-200 registered as D2-TBV, that departed from Albano Machado Airport operating a scheduled passenger service, suffered hydraulic problems following an explosion in the rear of the aircraft and returned to the airport of departure for an emergency landing. The aircraft touched down fast and overran the runway.
- March 22, 1984 – Pacific Western Airlines Flight 501, a 737-200 regularly scheduled flight that caught fire in Calgary, Alberta, Canada. Five people were seriously injured and 22 suffered minor injuries, but there were no fatalities. The aircraft was damaged beyond repair.
- August 30, 1984 – Cameroon Airlines Flight 786, a 737-200 (registration TJ-CBD) caught fire as the aircraft was taxiing out for takeoff at Douala International Airport in Douala, Cameroon. 107 of 109 passengers and seven crew were reported to have survived.
- November 23, 1985 – EgyptAir Flight 648, a 737-200 (registration SU-AYH) was hijacked by 3 Palestinian men en route to Cairo International Airport from Athens. During the first few minutes of the hijacking, a sky marshal fatally shot a hijacker before being severely wounded. The plane was ordered to land in Malta by the hijackers. Later, Egyptian commandos raided the aircraft. During the raid, 60 passengers died, including 1 hijacker, and 38 survived, including 1 hijacker.
- June 21, 1985 – Braathens SAFE Flight 139, a 737-200 was hijacked at the Trondheim Airport in Værnes, Norway. The aircraft was stormed and the hijacker arrested.
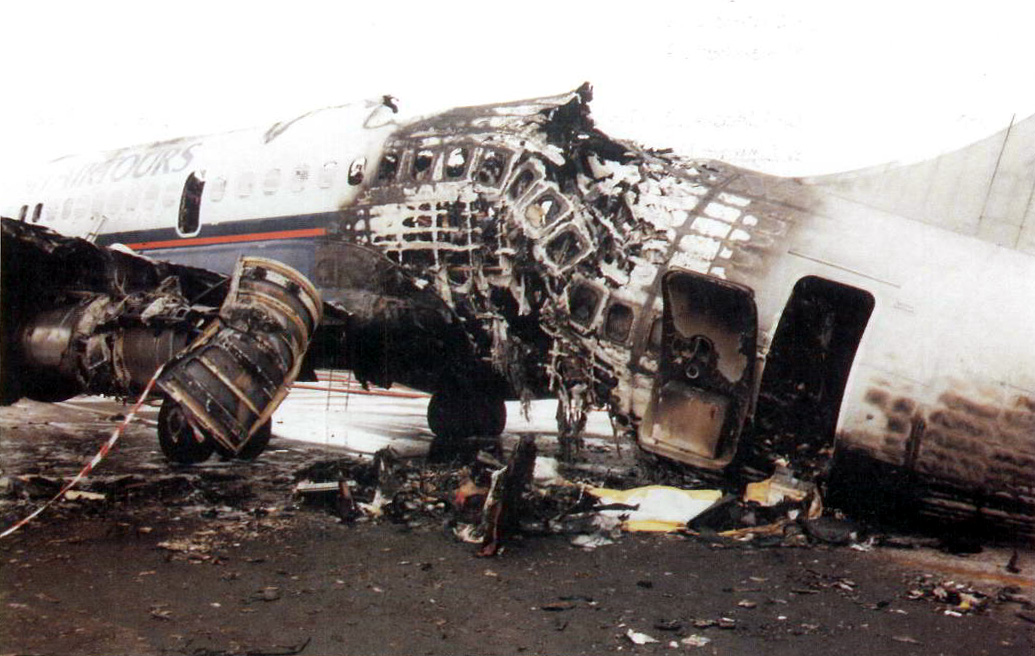
  The aftermath of Flight 28M
- August 22, 1985 – British Airtours Flight 28M, a 737-200, aborted its takeoff at Manchester Airport in Manchester, England, after it caught fire due to a crack in one of the combustors of the left Pratt & Whitney JT8D-15 engine. Of the 137 passengers and crew on board, 55 died, most due to toxic smoke inhalation. Research following the accident investigation led to many innovations in air safety, including a redesign of the 737's galley area.
- January 28, 1986 – VASP Flight 210, a 737-200, tried to take-off from a taxiway at São Paulo-Guarulhos Airport. The take-off was aborted, but the aircraft overran the pavement, collided with a dyke and broke in two. The weather was foggy. There was one fatality.
- 16 February 1986 – China Airlines Flight 2265 – a Boeing 737-281 operating a charter flight went missing after executing a go-around after touching down at Penghu Airport, Taiwan. It was discovered at March 10 on the seabed, 19 kilometres (12 mi; 10 nmi) north of the island. All six passengers and seven crew members were confirmed dead.
- October 15, 1986 – Iran Air 737-200 registered as EP-IRG was attacked by Iraqi aircraft. Passengers were disembarking at the time of the attack. According to Iranian authorities, some C-130 Hercules aircraft were also destroyed. Three occupants died.
- December 25, 1986 – Iraqi Airways Flight 163, a 737-200 that was hijacked and crashed, catching fire near Arar in Saudi Arabia. There were 106 people on board, and 60 passengers and 3 crew members died.
- August 4, 1987 – LAN Chile 737-200 registration CC-CHJ, landed short of the displaced threshold of runway 27 at El Loa Airport, Chile. The nosegear collapsed and the aircraft broke in two. A fire broke out 30 minutes later and destroyed the aircraft. The threshold was displaced by 0.88 kilometres (0.55 mi) due to construction work. There was one fatality.
- August 31, 1987 – Thai Airways Flight 365, a 737-200 registered as HS-TBC, crashed into the sea off Ko Phuket, Thailand. All 74 passengers and 9 crew on board lost their lives.
- January 2, 1988 – Condor Flugdienst Flight 3782, a 737-200 on a charter flight, crashed in Serefsihar near İzmir, Turkey, due to ILS problems. All 11 passengers and 5 crew died in the accident.

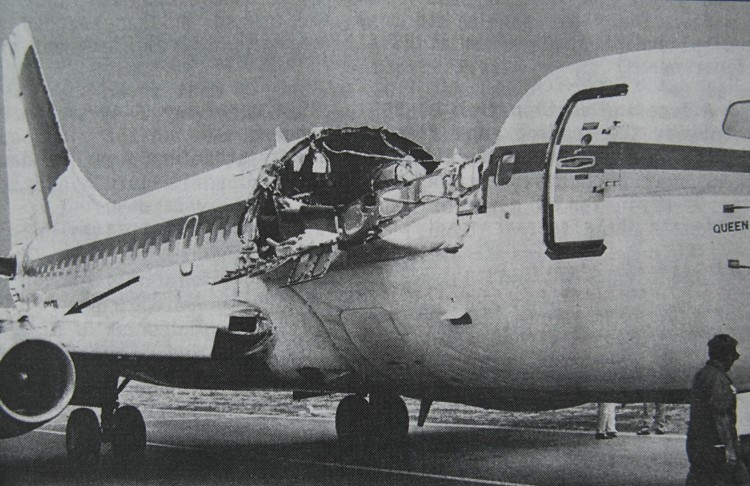
Aloha Airlines Flight 243 after its emergency landing at Kahului, Maui in April 1988

- April 28, 1988 – Aloha Airlines Flight 243, a 737-200 registered as N73711, suffered extensive damage after an explosive decompression at an altitude of 24,000 feet (7,300 m), but was able to land safely at Kahului Airport on the island of Maui with one fatality. A flight attendant, Clarabelle (C.B.) Lansing, who was not in restraints at the moment of decompression, was blown out of the aircraft over the ocean and her body was never found.
- September 15, 1988 – Ethiopian Airlines Flight 604, a 737-200, suffered a multiple bird strike while taking off from Bahir Dar Airport. Both engines failed and the airliner crashed and caught fire while trying to return to the airport. Thirty-five of 98 passengers died while all six crew members survived.
- September 26, 1988 – Aerolíneas Argentinas Flight 648, a Boeing 737-200, veered off the runway in crosswind condition during landing at Ushuaia Aeroclub, injuring 13 of the 62 on board, but no fatalities.
- October 19, 1988 – Indian Airlines Flight 113, a Boeing 737-200, had crashed on its final approach to Ahmedabad Airport, killing 133 of 135 people on board.
- February 9, 1989 – A LAM Mozambique Airlines 737-200 registered as C9-BAD overran the runway while making an emergency landing at Lichinga Airport. There were no fatalities. The aircraft was damaged beyond repair.
- April 3, 1989 – A Faucett Perú 737-200 registered as OB-R-1314 veered of the runway while landing during a heavy tropical rainstorm at Iquitos Airport in Peru's Amazon region. There were no fatalities among the 130 passengers and crew, but 14 people were injured, and the aircraft was destroyed in an ensuing fire.
- September 3, 1989 – A 737-200 registered as PP-VMK operating Varig Flight 254 flying from São Paulo-Guarulhos to Belém-Val de Cans with intermediate stops, crashed near São José do Xingu, Brazil while on the last leg of the flight between Marabá and Belém due to a pilot navigational error, which led to fuel exhaustion and a subsequent belly landing into the jungle, 450 miles (724 km) southwest of Marabá. Out of 54 occupants, there were 12 fatalities, all of them passengers. The survivors were discovered two days later.
- 26 October 1989 - China Airlines Flight 204 crashed into a mountain after takeoff from Hualien Airport, Taiwan. The crash killed all 54 passengers and crew on board the aircraft.

=== 1990s ===
- October 2, 1990 – The 1990 Guangzhou Baiyun airport collisions were the result of the hijacking of Xiamen Airlines Flight 8301, a 737-200 (registered B-2510). While attempting to land at Guangzhou Baiyun it struck two other airplanes. The hijacked aircraft struck a parked China Southwest Airlines Boeing 707 first, inflicting only minor damage, but then collided with China Southern Airlines Flight 3523, a Boeing 757-200 waiting for takeoff, and flipped on its back. A total of 128 people died, including 7 of 9 crew members and 75 of 93 passengers on Flight 8301 and 46 of 110 passengers on Flight 3523.
- March 3, 1991 – United Airlines Flight 585, a 737-200 registered as N999UA, carrying 20 passengers and 5 crew members, went out of control after a rudder malfunction and crashed outside of Colorado Springs Municipal Airport; all 25 passengers and crew on board died.
- August 16, 1991 – Indian Airlines Flight 257, a 737-2A8 crashed at Thangjing Hill while on approach to Imphal Airport, killing all 63 passengers and 6 crew members on board.
- June 6, 1992 – Copa Airlines Flight 201, a 737-204 Advanced registered as HP-1205CMP, en route from Tocumen International Airport in Panama City, Panama to Alfonso Bonilla Aragón International Airport in Cali, Colombia crashed into the Darién Gap 29 minutes after taking-off from Tocumen International Airport. All 47 on board (40 passengers and 7 crew) died in the accident.
- June 22, 1992 – VASP Cargo Flight 780, a 737-2A1C registered as PP-SND en route from Rio Branco to Cruzeiro do Sul crashed in the jungle while on arrival procedures to Cruzeiro do Sul. The crew of two and one passenger died.
- April 26, 1993 – Indian Airlines Flight 491, a 737-2A8, crashed shortly after takeoff from Aurangabad Airport in Maharashtra, India, after colliding with a lorry and high-tension powerlines. 55 out of the 112 people on board were killed.
- March 8, 1994 – A Sahara Airlines Boeing 737-200 crashed shortly after takeoff at Delhi-Indira Gandhi International Airport, India. The plane slammed into an Aeroflot Ilyushin 86 aircraft, destroying the aircraft. There were no passengers on either aircraft during the crash. All 4 crew members died, along with 5 people on the ground.
- December 21, 1994 – Air Algérie Flight 702P, a 737-200C on behalf of Phoenix Aviation crashed in Coventry, England. All 5 crew members died.
- August 9, 1995 – Aviateca Flight 901, a 737-200 (registered as N125GU) crashed on approach to the El Salvador International Airport in San Salvador, El Salvador. All 65 occupants died.
- November 13, 1995 – Nigeria Airways Flight 357, a 737-2F9 (registered as 5N-AUA), suffered a runway overrun at Kaduna Airport in Nigeria. All 14 crew members survived, but 11 of the 124 passengers died.
- December 3, 1995 – Cameroon Airlines Flight 3701, a 737-200 (registered as TJ-CBE) crashed after the crew lost control on approach to Douala International Airport in Douala, Cameroon. A total of 71 passengers and crew lost their lives, but there were 5 survivors.
- February 29, 1996 – Faucett Flight 251, a 737-200 (registered as OB-1451), crashed on approach to Rodríguez Ballón International Airport in Arequipa, Peru. A total of 117 passengers and 6 crew on board lost their lives.
- April 3, 1996 – United States Air Force CT-43A (a modified 737-200) tail number 73-1149 operating in a VIP transport flight, crashed on approach to Dubrovnik Airport in Dubrovnik, Croatia while on an official trade mission. All 5 crew and 30 passengers died, including U.S. Secretary of Commerce Ron Brown and The New York Times Frankfurt Bureau chief Nathaniel C. Nash.
- June 9, 1996 – Eastwind Airlines Flight 517, a 737-200 registered as N221US, on a scheduled domestic passenger flight between Trenton-Mercer Airport in Trenton, New Jersey and Richmond International Airport in Richmond, Virginia, experienced a loss of rudder control but the crew were able to land the aircraft successfully. There were no fatalities among the 48 passengers and 5 crew members.
- February 14, 1997 – A Varig 737-200 registered as PP-CJO, operating Varig Flight 265, flying from Marabá to Carajás Airport, veered off the right side of the runway at Carajás during a thunderstorm after its right main landing gear collapsed rearwards. The aircraft ended up in a wooded area, one crew member died.
- April 1, 1997 – An Americana de Aviación 737-293, registration OB-1572, was severely damaged while landing in Pucallpa Airport, Peru. It was reportedly ferried to Lima and scrapped there two months later as a write-off.
- May 5, 1998 – Occidental Petroleum 737-200 (registered as FAP-351) leased from the Peruvian Air Force, operating a charter flight from Coronel FAP Francisco Secada Vignetta International Airport in Iquitos, Peru, crashed in rainy weather whilst on approach to Alférez FAP Alfredo Vladimir Sara Bauer Airport in Andoas, Peru. There were 75 fatalities, only eleven passengers and two crew members survived.
- May 10, 1999 – A Mexican Air Force 737-200 was on a training flight when it overran the runway while making an emergency landing at Loma Bonita Air Base, Mexico. The nose gear collapsed. Grass near the aircraft caught fire causing it to burn out. There were no fatalities. The aircraft was damaged beyond repair.
- August 31, 1999 – LAPA Flight 3142, a 737-200, crashed while attempting to take off with an incorrect wing flaps configuration from the Jorge Newbery Airport in Buenos Aires en route to Córdoba, Argentina. The crash resulted in 63 fatalities but with 37 survivors.

=== 2000s ===
- April 19, 2000 – Air Philippines Flight 541, a 737-200 flying from Ninoy Aquino International Airport in Manila crashed on approach to Francisco Bangoy International Airport in Davao City, Philippines. All 124 passengers and 7 crew members on board died.
- July 17, 2000 – Alliance Air Flight 7412 stalled on approach to Lok Nayak Jayaprakash Airport, India, killing 55 of the 58 occupants; 5 more people on the ground were also killed
- March 6, 2003 – Air Algérie Flight 6289, a 737-200 crashed shortly after taking off from Tamanrasset, Algeria. Ninety-six passengers and six crew on board perished but a 28-year-old soldier, Youcef Djillali, survived the accident
- July 8, 2003 – Sudan Airways Flight 139, a 737-200C registered as ST-AFK, stalled and crashed in Port Sudan, Sudan resulting in the deaths of 116 occupants (105 out of the 106 passengers and all 11 crew members) on board.
- 13 December, 2003 - Aero Continente Flight 341, a Boeing 737-200 (registered OB-1544-P) operating from Caracas to Lima, belly landed at the runway of the Jorge Chávez International Airport because the pilots had forgotten about lowering the landing gear since they had to cope with a problem concerning the flaps. The aircraft was damaged beyond repair, but all 94 passengers and six crew on board survived the accident.
- February 3, 2005 – Kam Air Flight 904, a 737-200 registered as EX-037, crashed into the Pamir Mountains in Afghanistan. All 96 passengers and 8 crew members on board lost their lives. The accident is the deadliest air disaster in Afghanistan's aviation history, and the exact cause remains unknown.
- August 23, 2005 – TANS Perú Flight 204, a 737-200 crashed on approach to Pucallpa Airport in Peru. Of the 98 occupants, 40 lost their lives.
- September 5, 2005 – Mandala Airlines Flight 091, a 737-200, crashed in a densely populated neighborhood of Medan, North Sumatra, Indonesia, after the crew commenced the takeoff with the aircraft's flaps deployed to an incorrect position. It was carrying 117 on board, of whom 95 passengers and 5 crew, as well as 49 people on the ground, died, making it the deadliest involving the Boeing 737 Original.
- October 22, 2005 – Bellview Airlines Flight 210, a 737-200 registered as 5N-BFN, stalled and crashed shortly after taking off from Murtala Mohammed Airport in Lagos, Nigeria en route to the Nnamdi Azikiwe International Airport in Abuja, resulting of the deaths of all 117 occupants (111 passengers and 6 crew members).
- October 29, 2006 – ADC Airlines Flight 53, a 737-200 crashed during a storm shortly after takeoff from Nnamdi Azikiwe International Airport in Abuja, Nigeria. All but 9 of the 105 passengers and crew died.
- January 24, 2007 – Air West Flight 612, a 737-200 was hijacked by a 26-year-old man, Mohamed Abdu Altif, who entered the cockpit of the aircraft approximately half an hour after takeoff from Khartoum International Airport in Sudan. The aircraft landed safely at N'Djamena International Airport in Chad where the hijacker surrendered. All 95 passengers and 8 crew on board survived.
- November 1, 2007 – Mandala Airlines Flight 260, a 737-200 registered as PK-RIL, had a severe heavy landing on runway 35 at Abdul Rachman Saleh Airport in East Java, Indonesia. The investigation found that the pilot failed to observe the excessive 1,000 feet per minute rate of descent during the approach for landing, thus creating an unstabilised approach. The pilot in command failed to respond to any of the audible warnings from any of ground proximity warning systems (GPWS), particularly the initial "Sink Rate, Sink Rate" and the three subsequent "Pull Up, Pull Up" aural warnings. Data recovered from the flight data recorder revealed that after a rate of descent of 1,750 feet per minute, the aircraft bounced around 20 feet (6 metres) following the heavy landing. Of the 94 total occupants onboard, there were no serious injuries. The aircraft was damaged beyond repair and written off.
- November 7, 2007 – Nationwide Airlines Flight 723, a 737-200, had its right engine fall off the wing as it took off from Cape Town, South Africa. The aircraft managed to return safely to the airport. Although the damage to the aircraft was considered minor, it was written off.
- August 24, 2008 – Iran Aseman Airlines Flight 6895, a 737-200 from Itek Air wet leased to Iran Aseman Airlines crashed while attempting an emergency landing at Bishkek, Kyrgyzstan, ten minutes after departure from there. The airliner was supposed to fly to Tehran. Out of 85 passengers and 5 crew, there were 22 survivors.
- August 30, 2008 – A Conviasa 737-200 Advanced registered as YV-102T, operating a ferry flight from Simón Bolívar International Airport in Maiquetía, Venezuela, stalled and crashed into the Illiniza Volcano, Ecuador. All of the 3 crew members on board died.

=== 2010s ===
- March 1, 2010 – Air Tanzania Flight 100, a 737-200 registered as 5H-MVZ, sustained substantial damage when it departed the runway on landing at Mwanza Airport and the nose gear collapsed. Damage was also caused to an engine. The aircraft was damaged beyond repair and was written off.
- August 20, 2011 – First Air Flight 6560, a 737-200, crashed near Resolute Bay in the Canadian territory of Nunavut. Of the 15 people on board, there were 3 survivors.
- April 20, 2012 – Bhoja Air Flight 213, a 737-200, crashed in Rawalpindi, Pakistan. All 127 passengers and crew on board died.
- May 18, 2018 – Cubana de Aviación Flight 972 on lease of Global Air (Mexico), crashed immediately after takeoff from José Martí International Airport in Havana. The crash killed all 6 crew members and 106 of the 107 passengers. The sole survivor suffered serious injuries. Investigators found errors in weight and balance calculations, which likely affected the stability at lift-off.

=== 2020s ===
- July 2, 2021 – Transair Flight 810 – One engine on the Boeing 737-200 cargo aircraft failed en route from Honolulu to the neighboring Hawaiian island of Maui. The pilots accidentally turned off the engine which was in perfect condition. The faulty engine eventually overheated and the pilots were forced to ditch the aircraft into the Māmala Bay. Both pilots survived the ditching and were eventually rescued by the United States Coast Guard. The aircraft was a write-off.
- May 3, 2025 – A cargo Boeing 737-290C Advanced operated by IBM Airlines was destroyed at Nyala Airport by the Sudanese Armed Forces (SAF) during the Sudanese civil war. It was destroyed due to suspicions of carrying military weapons and supplies to the Rapid Support Forces (RSF). 54 out of 111 occupants on board the aircraft were killed. According to Reuters analyses the aircraft was bombed, while standing at the tarmac.

== 737 Classic (−300/-400/-500) ==
=== 1980s ===
- May 24, 1988 – TACA Flight 110, a 737-300 en route to New Orleans, suffered double engine failure due to a severe hail storm. The pilot conducted a successful forced landing on a grass levee. The aircraft was repaired and returned to service. As a result of this incident, further engine development was carried out to prevent flameouts in severe weather conditions.
- September 29, 1988 – VASP Flight 375, a 737-300, was hijacked by Raimundo Nonato Alves da Conceição, who aimed to crash the plane with 105 people (98 passengers and 7 crew) aboard against the Planalto Palace in Brasília. The flight left Porto Velho to Rio de Janeiro, making stops in Brasília, Goiânia and Belo Horizonte. The hijacking was unsuccessful, and the aircraft landed safely in Goiânia. The First Officer was the only fatality.
- January 8, 1989 – British Midland Airways Flight 92, a 737-400, crashed on an embankment adjacent to the M1 motorway while attempting to land at East Midlands Airport. The aircraft broke apart on impact. Of the 8 crew and 118 passengers, 47 passengers died. The left engine had suffered a fan blade fracture and the crew, unfamiliar with the 737-400, shut down the still-functional right engine, causing the aircraft to lose power. This accident marked the first hull loss of a 737 Classic.
- September 20, 1989 – USAir Flight 5050, a 737-400, drifted to the left and plunged into Bowery Bay at LaGuardia Airport after the crew attempted to abort the takeoff due to a mistrimmed rudder; 2 passengers died out of the 63 on board.

=== 1990s ===
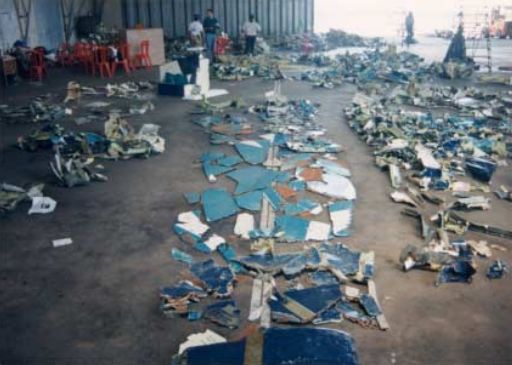
Wreckage of SilkAir Flight 185

- May 11, 1990 – Philippine Airlines Flight 143, a 737-300 registered as EI-BZG, was due to fly from Ninoy Aquino International Airport in Manila to Mandurriao Airport in Iloilo City when the central fuel tank exploded while the aircraft was being pushed back from the terminal. Eight passengers among the 120 passengers and crew on board died in the explosion and subsequent fire. This accident marked the first hull loss of a 737-300.
- February 1, 1991 – USAir Flight 1493, operated by a 737-300, collided with a Fairchild Metro III of SkyWest Airlines while landing at Los Angeles. All 12 people on the Fairchild Metro died, while 21 passengers and 2 crew members out of 6 crew members and 83 passengers died on the 737.
- November 24, 1992 – China Southern Airlines Flight 3943, a 737-300, crashed on descent to Guilin Liangjiang International Airport; all 141 people on board died.
- July 26, 1993 – Asiana Airlines Flight 733, using a 737-500, crashed into a mountain near Mokpo Airport; 68 of 116 occupants died. This was the first hull loss of a 737-500.
- September 8, 1994 – USAir Flight 427, using a 737-300 with 127 passengers and 5 crew members, went out of control after a rudder malfunction and crashed near Pittsburgh International Airport; everyone on board died. The cause was due to a design flaw within the rudder of the 737, which had caused the crash of United Airlines Flight 585, a 737-200, on March 3, 1991.
- September 13, 1994 – Polynesian Airlines Flight PH844, using a 737-300 from Fuaʻamotu International Airport to Faleolo International Airport discovered the body of a deceased male stowaway was jamming the starboard carriageway. After 3.5 hours of maneuvers attempting to dislodge the body, the flight made an emergency landing using only the nosewheel and port undercarriage. All 72 occupants survived with minimal damage to the aircraft.
- December 29, 1994 – Turkish Airlines Flight 278, a 737-400 registered as TC-JES, en route from Esenboğa International Airport in Ankara, Turkey, crashed while attempting to land at Van Ferit Melen Airport in eastern Turkey. Five of the seven crew and 52 of the 69 passengers lost their lives, while the other 2 crew members and 17 passengers sustained serious injuries.
- May 8, 1997 – China Southern Airlines Flight 3456, using a 737-300, crashed while landing at Shenzhen; 35 of 65 passengers and two of nine crew members died.
- December 19, 1997 – SilkAir Flight 185, using a 737-300 with 97 passengers and 7 crew members, crashed into a river in Indonesia; everyone on board died.
- September 16, 1998 – Continental Airlines Flight 475, using a 737-500, encountered wind-shear while landing at Guadalajara, Mexico. None of the passengers and crew received injuries. The aircraft was written off.
- April 7, 1999 – Turkish Airlines Flight 5904, using a 737-400 with six crew members, crashed in Turkey. All of the crew on board died; there were no passengers on board.

=== 2000s ===
- March 5, 2000 – Southwest Airlines Flight 1455, using a 737-300, overran the runway upon landing at Burbank, California, narrowly missing a gas station. All of the passengers and crew survived.
- March 3, 2001 – Thai Airways International Flight 114, a 737-400 bound for Chiang Mai from Bangkok, was destroyed by an explosion while on the ground, the result of ignition of the flammable fuel/air mixture in the tank. The source of the ignition energy for the explosion could not be determined with certainty, but the most likely source was an explosion originating at the center wing tank fuel pump as a result of running the pump in the presence of metal shavings and a fuel/air mixture. One flight attendant died; incident occurred prior to passenger boarding.
- January 16, 2002 – Garuda Indonesia Flight 421, using a 737-300, en route from Lombok to Yogyakarta, was forced to make an emergency ditching on the Solo River. One person, a flight attendant, died in the accident.
- May 7, 2002 – EgyptAir Flight 843, using a 737-500, crashed during approach to Tunis. Three of six crew members and 11 of 56 passengers died.
- January 3, 2004 – Flash Airlines Flight 604, using a 737-300 with 135 passengers and 13 crew members, crashed into the Red Sea, everyone on board died, making it the deadliest involving the Boeing 737 Classic.
- June 9, 2005 – US Airways Flight 1170, a 737-300, avoided collision with an Airbus A330 of Aer Lingus at Logan Airport in Boston, Massachusetts.
- August 14, 2005 – Helios Airways Flight 522, a 737-300, suffered a gradual decompression which incapacitated five of the 6 crew members and all 115 passengers. The aircraft circled in the vicinity of Athens International Airport on its pre-programmed flight path before running out of fuel and crashing near Grammatiko; everyone on board died.
- January 16, 2006 – Continental Airlines Flight 1515, a Boeing 737-500, was set to depart from El Paso International Airport for George Bush Intercontinental Airport, when the right engine suffered an oil leak. The captain was asked by the mechanics to run the engine up to 70% for three minutes. Shortly after the power was increased, one of the mechanics stood up, stepped into the inlet hazard zone, and died instantly when he was ingested into the engine.
- June 15, 2006 – TNT Airways Flight 352, using a 737-300 freighter and operating from Liège Airport in Belgium to London Stansted Airport in the United Kingdom had to divert to East Midlands Airport due to bad weather. On final approach, the autopilot was disengaged for a short period. The aircraft touched down off the runway to the left, resulting in the right main landing gear being detached and the right wing tip and engine scraping the ground. The pilots managed to lift off again and subsequently made an emergency diversion to Birmingham Airport, where a landing was performed on the remaining two landing gear, during which the aircraft scraped on its nose and right engine. There were no injuries. The cause of the crash was determined to be a poorly timed message from local air traffic control which the pilot misinterpreted, causing him to descend too quickly. The team of pilots were said by the airline to have managed the situation with skill once the error had been detected, but were dismissed from service with the company as a result of the incident. The aircraft was severely damaged and was written off.
- July 23, 2006 – United Airlines Flight 1015, a Boeing 737-322, nearly collided with Atlas Air Flight 6972, a Boeing 747-47UF. All 131 survive without injury.
- October 3, 2006 – Turkish Airlines Flight 1476, a 737-400, was hijacked by Hakan Ekinci in Greek airspace. All 107 passengers and six crew members on board survived. The aircraft landed safely at Brindisi Airport in Italy.
- January 1, 2007 – Adam Air Flight 574, a 737-400 with 96 passengers and six crew members aboard, crashed off the coast of Sulawesi. All 102 people on board died, making it the deadliest accident involving the 737-400.

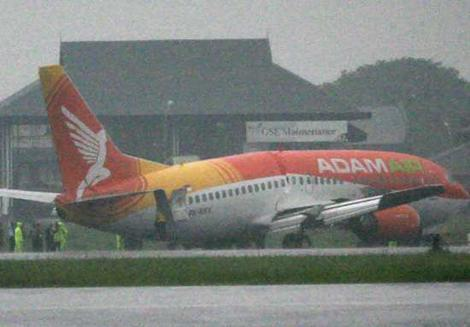
Adam Air Flight 172, showing the collapsed rear fuselage

- February 21, 2007 – Adam Air Flight 172, a 737-300, suffered a structural failure when landing at Juanda International Airport. All of the passengers and crew survived.
- March 7, 2007 – Garuda Indonesia Flight 200, a 737-400, crashed upon landing at Adisucipto International Airport. Of 133 passengers and 7 crew members, 20 passengers and 1 crew member died.
- September 14, 2008 – Aeroflot Flight 821, using an Aeroflot-Nord-operated 737-500, crashed shortly before its scheduled arrival at Perm, Russia. All 82 passengers and 6 crew members died, making this the deadliest accident involving the 737-500.
- December 20, 2008 – Continental Airlines Flight 1404, a 737-500, veered off the runway and caught fire at Denver International Airport during an attempted departure. There were no casualties.
- July 13, 2009 – Southwest Airlines Flight 2294, a 737-300 suffered an explosive decompression when, while airborne, a hole opened in the fuselage, 17.4 inches (44 cm) long, and between 8.6 to 11.5 inches (22 to 29 cm) wide, forward of the leading edge of the vertical stabilizer, at the rear end of the aircraft, due to metal fatigue. The aircraft made an emergency landing at Charleston, West Virginia. All 131 on board survived. The aircraft at the time had 42,500 flight cycles and 50,500 flight hours. Boeing had calculated that 737 models of that generation would not require inspection for hairline cracks until 60,000 cycles.

=== 2010s ===
- January 16, 2010 – A UTair Aviation Boeing 737-500 registered as VQ-BAC, departed the runway on landing at Vnukovo International Airport and was substantially damaged when the nosewheel collapsed.
- April 13, 2010 – Merpati Nusantara Airlines Flight 836, a 737-300 registered as PK-MDE, overran the runway at Rendani Airport, Manokwari, Indonesia and broke in two. All 103 passengers and 7 crew members escaped alive, and 44 people were injured; 10 seriously and 34 minorly.
- November 2, 2010 – Lion Air Flight 712, a Boeing 737-400 registered as PK-LIQ, overran the runway on landing at Supadio Airport in Pontianak, Indonesia, coming to rest on its belly. All 174 passengers and crew evacuated by the emergency chutes, with few injuries reported.
- April 1, 2011 – Southwest Airlines Flight 812, a 737-300 had a six-foot tear in the upper fuselage, also caused by metal fatigue, on a flight from Phoenix Sky Harbor Airport to Sacramento International Airport, and diverted to a military base in Yuma, Arizona after an emergency descent. One minor injury was reported.
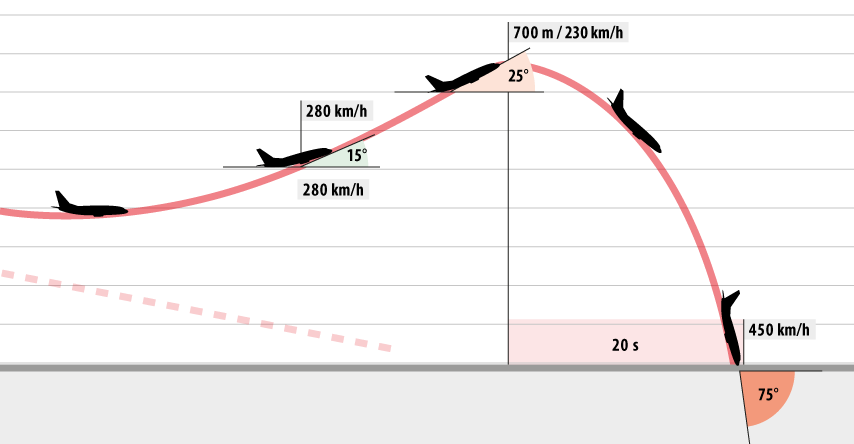
- Photo showing Tatarstan Airlines Flight 363 Flight Path before impact.
  November 17, 2013 – Tatarstan Airlines Flight 363, a 737-500, crashed near Kazan International Airport, en route from Moscow; all 44 passengers and six crew on board died.
- November 22, 2015 – Avia Traffic Company Flight 768, a 737-300 registered as EX-37005, touched down hard at Osh Airport injuring eight, and causing all the landing gear to be ripped off. The aircraft skidded off the runway and the left engine was torn from its mounting.
- August 5, 2016 – ASL Airlines Hungary Flight 7332, a 737-400 in cargo configuration registered as HA-FAX, landed on Milan Bergamo's Orio al Serio Airport but overran the runway. The aircraft broke through the airport perimeter fence, a parking lot, a guardrail and came to a stop on a road 520 meters (1,706 ft) past the end of the runway. The aircraft sustained substantial damage, losing both engines and all landing gear legs. Of the two flight crew members, only the captain was injured.
- March 28, 2017 – Peruvian Airlines Flight 112, a 737-300, departed from Jorge Chávez International Airport and landed in Francisco Carle Airport in Jauja where it suffered an undercarriage failure, causing a forced landing and then catching fire. All 138 passengers and crew survived after a fast evacuation. Thirty-nine of the passengers were taken to the hospital. The aircraft was declared a total loss.

=== 2020s ===
- January 9, 2021 – Sriwijaya Air Flight 182, a Boeing 737-524 registered as PK-CLC, took off from Jakarta to Pontianak. After reaching an altitude of 10,900 feet, the left engine thrust decreased while the right engine thrust remained in place, the flight experienced an upset and rolled to the left and it quickly descended and lost radio contact in the Thousand Islands area of the Java Sea. There were 62 people on board consisting of 50 passengers, six operating crew members, and six other crew members traveling as passengers. All people on board were killed. It was caused by an auto throttle failure leading to pilot error.
- February 6, 2023 – A Coulson Aviation Boeing 737-300 FireLiner Large Air Tanker (LAT) registered as N619SW, contracted to the Western Australian Department of Fire and Emergency Services (DFES) crashed whilst fighting a fire at the Fitzgerald River National Park near Ravensthorpe, Western Australia. Both crew members survived the accident.
- May 9, 2024 – A Boeing 737-300 operated by Transair (Senegal) overran the runway during a rejected takeoff at Blaise Diagne International Airport. There were no fatalities among the 85 people on board, with 10 injuries reported.
- November 9, 2024 – Total Linhas Aéreas Flight 5682, a cargo Boeing 737-4Q8 (SF) registered as PS-TLB, suffered an in-flight fire and was forced to make an emergency landing at São Paulo/Guarulhos International Airport. The plane stopped on the runway, where it was destroyed by the fire. Both crew members on board survived. However, the aircraft was declared a hull loss.
- November 25, 2024 – Swiftair Flight 5960, a Boeing 737-400SF registered as EC-MFE, crashed on approach to Vilnius Airport in Lithuania. One crew member died in the accident and the three others were injured.
- July 7, 2026 – K2 Airways Flight 1732, a Boeing 737-4M0 registered as AP-BOI, crashed in the Arabian Sea after it took off from Sharjah International Airport, United Arab Emirates to Karachi-Jinnah International Airport, Pakistan. There were reportedly five crew members onboard. Searches for the crew have been ongoing.

== 737 Next Generation (−600/-700/-800/-900) ==
=== 2000s ===
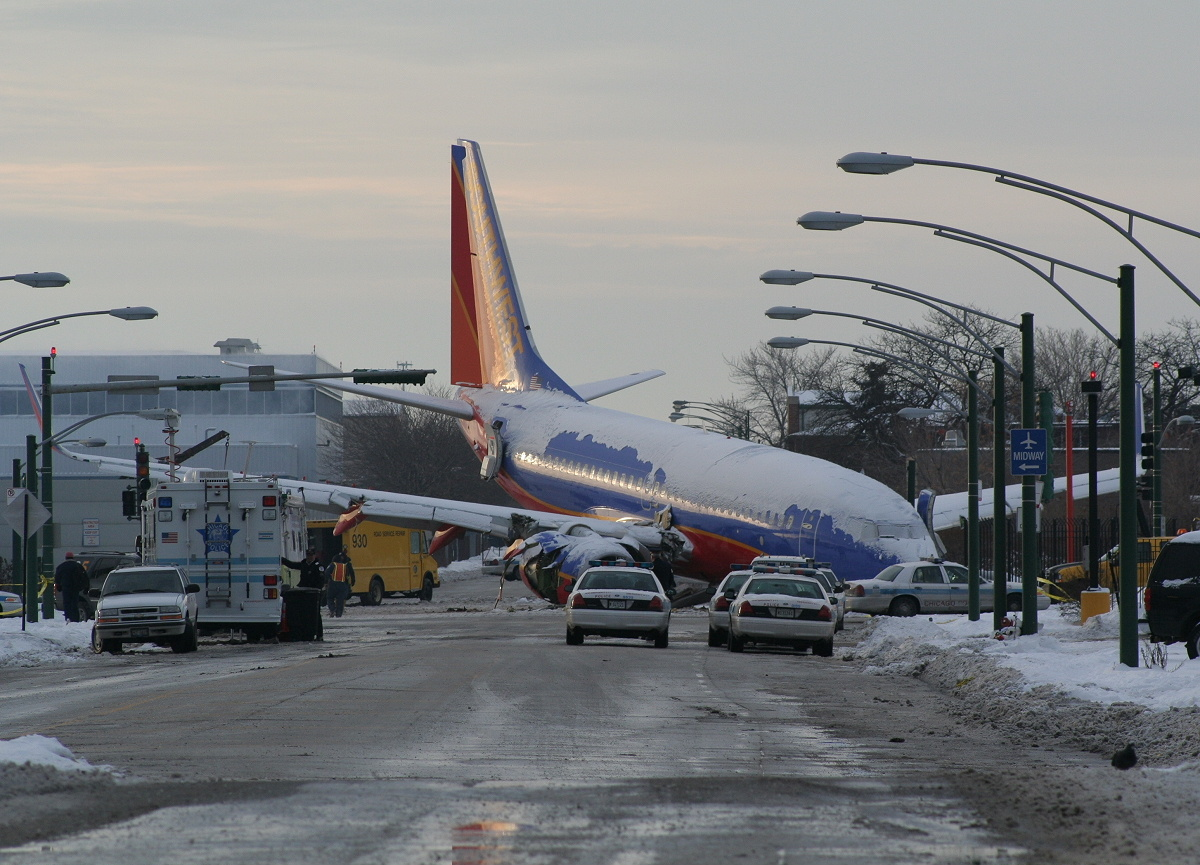
Southwest Airlines Flight 1248

- December 8, 2005: Southwest Airlines Flight 1248, a 737-700, skidded off a runway upon landing at Chicago Midway International Airport in heavy snow conditions. A six-year-old boy died in a car struck by the airliner after it skidded into a street. People on board the aircraft and on the ground reported several minor injuries. The aircraft involved, N471WN, was re-registered as N286WN after repairs.
- September 29, 2006: Gol Transportes Aéreos Flight 1907, a brand-new 737-800 with 154 people on board broke up and crashed following a midair collision in Brazil with an Embraer Legacy 600. All on board the 737-800 died. The Legacy landed safely at a Brazilian Air Force base. The accident resulted in the first hull loss and first fatal accident involving the 737NG.
- May 5, 2007: Kenya Airways Flight 507, a 737-800 carrying 108 passengers and 6 crew lost contact and crashed into a swamp on a flight to Nairobi, Kenya from Abidjan, Côte d'Ivoire, after making a scheduled stop at Douala, Cameroon. There were no survivors.
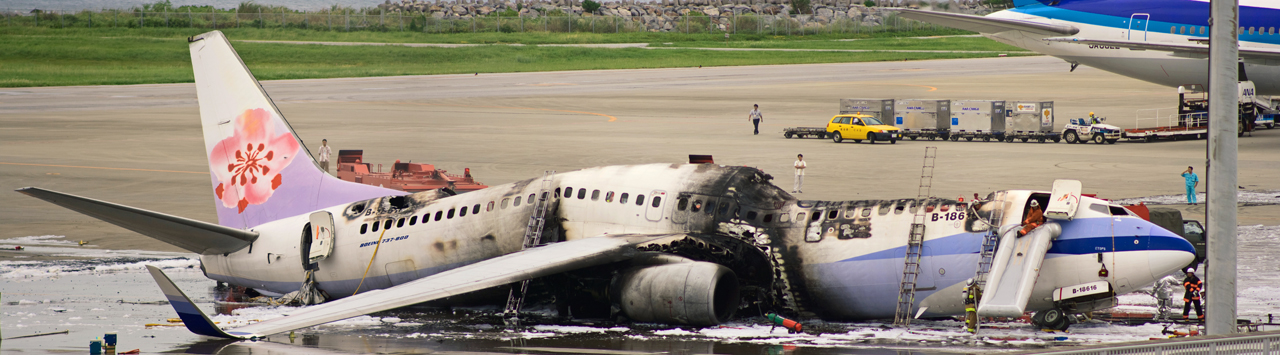
  China Airlines Flight 120
- August 20, 2007: China Airlines Flight 120, a 737-800 inbound from Taipei, caught fire shortly after landing at Naha Airport on the Japanese island of Okinawa. There were no fatalities. Following this accident, the US Federal Aviation Administration (FAA) issued an Emergency Airworthiness Directive (EAD) on August 25 ordering inspection of all Boeing 737NG series aircraft for loose components in the wing leading edge slats within 24 days. On August 28, after initial reports from these inspections, the FAA issued a further EAD requiring a detailed borescope inspection within 10 days, and an explicit tightening of a nut-and-bolt assembly within 24 days.
- November 10, 2008: Ryanair Flight 4102, a 737-800 from Frankfurt-Hahn suffered substantial damage in an emergency landing at Rome Ciampino Airport. The cause of the accident was stated to be birdstrikes affecting both engines. The port undercarriage of the 737 collapsed. Of the 6 crew and 166 passengers on board, two crew and eight passengers were taken to hospital with minor injuries. The engines and undercarriage were damaged along with the rear fuselage by contact with the runway.
- February 25, 2009: Turkish Airlines Flight 1951, a 737-800 arriving from Istanbul, crashed into a field near Amsterdam Schiphol Airport's Polderbaan, breaking the fuselage into three pieces and separating an engine pylon. Of the 135 passengers and crew, there were nine fatalities: five passengers and four crew members (including both pilots and a pilot-in-training); 84 people suffered injuries. Crash investigations initially focused on a malfunctioning left radar altimeter, which may have resulted in false altitude information causing the autothrottle to reduce power.
- December 22, 2009: American Airlines Flight 331, a 737-800 (registration N977AN) overran the runway at Norman Manley International Airport in Kingston, Jamaica during a landing hampered by poor weather. The aircraft continued on the ground outside the airport perimeter and broke apart causing injuries. All 154 persons on board survived.

=== 2010s ===
- January 25, 2010: Ethiopian Airlines Flight 409, a 737-800, crashed into the Mediterranean Sea shortly after take-off from Beirut Rafic Hariri International Airport in Beirut, Lebanon. The flight had 82 passengers and 8 crew, 50 passengers of whom were Lebanese, and was bound for the Ethiopian capital of Addis Ababa. There were no survivors.

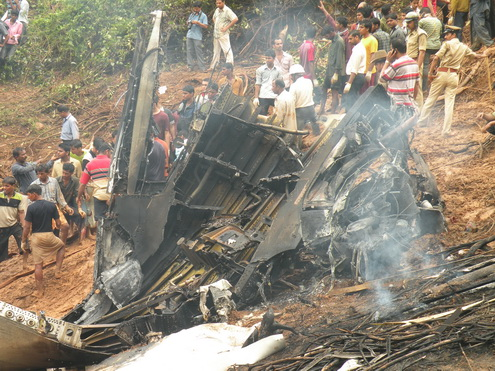
Wreckage of Air India Express Flight 812, in which 158 people died

- May 22, 2010: Air India Express Flight 812, a 737-800, overran the runway on landing at Mangalore International Airport; 158 passengers, including 6 crew on board, died. There were eight survivors. The airliner crashed through the fence at the end of the runway going into a valley 200 feet below. Although the 8,000 ft runway is sufficient for landing there was no bare land at the end of the runway on the table top airport to account for mistakes.
- August 16, 2010: AIRES Flight 8250, a 737-700, crashed and split into three pieces on the Colombian island of San Andres. There was no fire and two fatalities reported.
- July 30, 2011: Caribbean Airlines Flight 523, a 737-800, overran the runway in rainy weather and crashed through the perimeter fence while landing at Cheddi Jagan International Airport in Guyana. The aircraft broke into two at the forward fuselage. There were no fatalities, but several passengers were injured with at least two passengers suffering broken legs. Caribbean Airlines confirmed 157 passengers and 6 crew members were on board.
- September 6, 2011: All Nippon Airways Flight 140, a 737-700 registered as JA16AN suffered an in-flight upset over the coast of Kushimoto, Wakayama, Inverting upside down and diving steeply. Two out of the 117 passengers onboard sustained injuries, but there were no fatalities.
- October 14, 2012: Corendon Airlines Flight 773, a 737-800 registered as TC-TJK, sustained substantial fire damage to the cockpit at Antalya Airport in Turkey. The fire started in the flightdeck during push-back from the gate. There were 189 passengers and 7 crew on board; 27 passengers were hospitalized, with 2 serious injuries reported from the emergency evacuation. The aircraft was written off.
- April 13, 2013: Lion Air Flight 904, a 737-800 registered as PK-LKS, operating from Bandung to Denpasar in Indonesia with 108 people on board, undershot runway 09 and crashed into the sea while landing at Ngurah Rai International Airport. The aircraft's fuselage ruptured slightly near the wings. All passengers and crew were safely evacuated with only minor injuries.
- July 22, 2013: Southwest Airlines Flight 345, a 737-700, suffered a nosegear collapse while landing at LaGuardia Airport after touching down nosegear first due to pilot error; the nosegear collapsed upward into the fuselage, causing severe damage to the electronics bay. Of the 150 people on board, nine occupants received minor injuries in the evacuation. The aircraft involved, which cost 15.5 million dollars, was written off.
- September 5, 2015: CEIBA Intercontinental Flight 071, a 737-800 registered as 3C-LLY, collided with a Hawker Siddeley HS-125-700A air ambulance operated by Senegalair. The 737 received minor damage to its right wingtip and landed safely saving all 112 occupants onboard whereas the HS-125 crashed into the Atlantic Ocean presumably because the pilots fell victim to hypoxia. Seven people died.
- March 19, 2016: Flydubai Flight 981, a 737-800 flying from Dubai, United Arab Emirates to Rostov-on-Don, Russia, crashed on the final approach to Rostov-on-Don Airport in inclement weather, killing all 62 people on board.
- April 4, 2016: Batik Air Flight 7703, a 737-800, was in the takeoff roll at Halim Perdanakusuma Airport, Jakarta, Indonesia when its left wing tip struck the vertical tail and left wing of a TransNusa ATR 42 crossing the runway under tow and separated most of the vertical tailplane as well as the left wing from the ATR, with the left wing tank ruptured open. Both aircraft caught fire, and the passengers were evacuated via slides. There were no injuries.
- August 27, 2016: Southwest Airlines Flight 3472, a 737-700, experienced an uncontained engine failure in flight from New Orleans, Louisiana to Orlando, Florida. Debris from the engine damaged the airplane fuselage, creating a hole and resulting in a loss of cabin pressure. The aircraft made an emergency landing in Pensacola, Florida. There were no injuries or fatalities.
- December 27, 2016: Jet Airways Flight 2374, a Boeing 737-800 (WL), was preparing for departure for Chhatrapati Shivaji Maharaj International Airport from Dabolim Airport and had lined up on the runway when suddenly, the aircraft veered right and departed the runway. 16 of its 161 occupants suffered minor injuries. The aircraft was repaired and returned to service.
- January 13, 2018: Pegasus Airlines Flight 8622, a 737-800, slid off the runway at Trabzon Airport while landing in rain. There were no fatalities.
- April 17, 2018: Southwest Airlines Flight 1380, a 737-700, made an emergency landing at Philadelphia International Airport following an in-flight engine failure of the left engine. Debris from the engine cracked a cabin window which then failed, causing explosive decompression; a passenger partially ejected from the aircraft later died of her injuries.
- August 16, 2018: Xiamen Airlines Flight 8667, a 737-800 registered as B-5498, crash-landed at Manila's Ninoy Aquino International Airport, Philippines during heavy monsoon rains. The 737-800 skidded off the end of the runway, causing left engine and main gear to collapse. All 157 passengers and crew safely evacuated.
- September 1, 2018: Utair Flight 579, a 737-800, on a flight from Vnukovo International Airport with 164 passengers and 6 crew, overran the runway and caught fire while landing at Sochi International Airport, injuring 18 people.
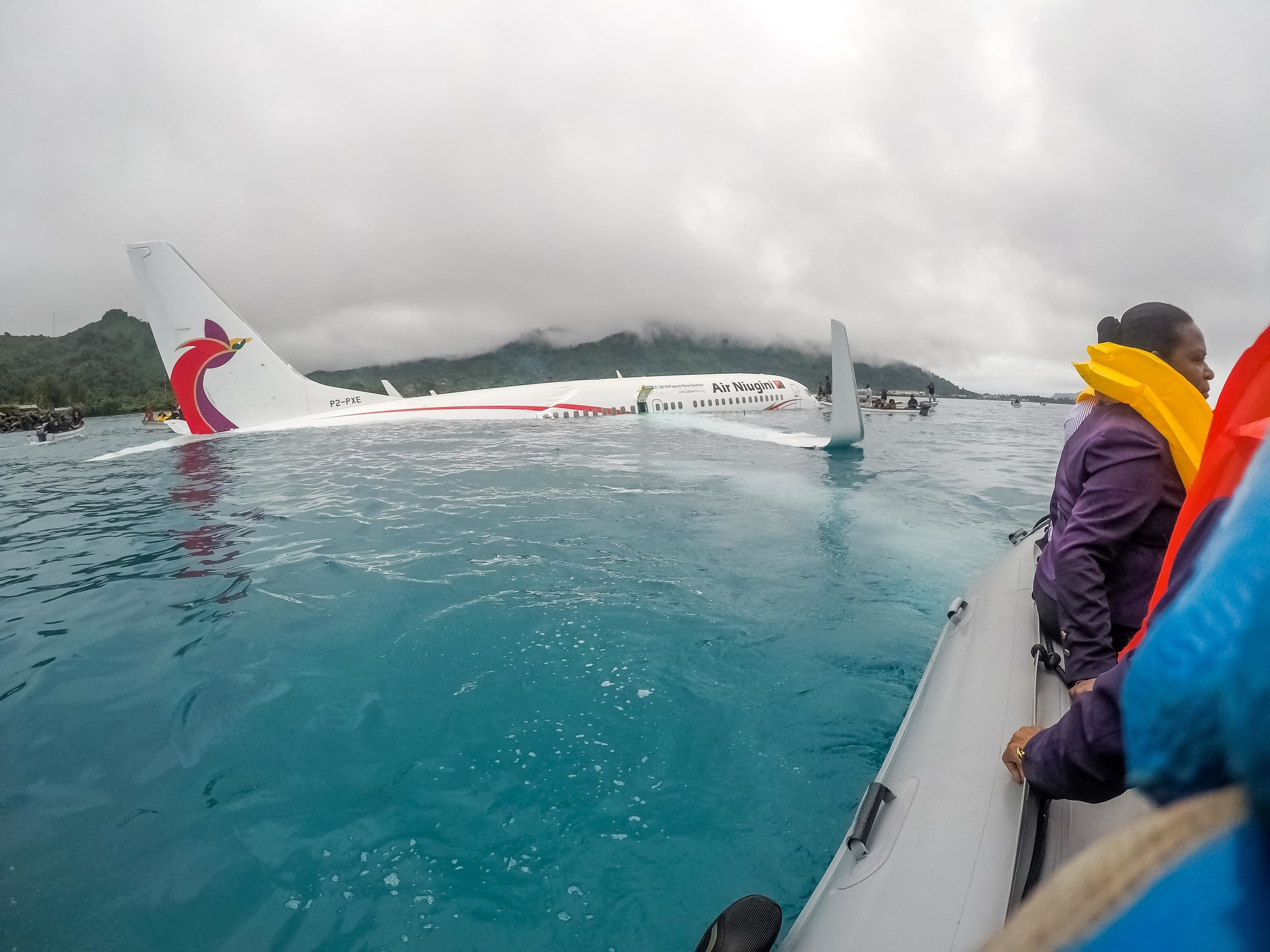
- The aftermath of Air Niugini Flight 73
  September 28, 2018: Air Niugini Flight 73, a 737-800, on a flight from Pohnpei, Federated States of Micronesia, to Port Moresby, Papua New Guinea, with an intermediate stop at Chuuk International Airport, undershot the runway at Chuuk and landed in a lagoon. One of the 47 occupants died.
- May 3, 2019: Miami Air Flight 293, a Boeing 737-800, a military charter flight from Guantanamo Bay to Naval Air Station Jacksonville with 143 passengers and crew, skidded off the runway into the St. Johns River in shallow waters attempting to land during a thunderstorm, there were 21 minor injuries but no fatalities. The aircraft was written off.
- July 1, 2019: SpiceJet Flight 6237, a Boeing 737-800 registered as VT-SYK, serving a flight from Jaipur to Mumbai, overran the runway on landing at Chhatrapati Shivaji Maharaj International Airport, causing the nose landing gear to collapse. There were no injuries among the 167 people on board, but the aircraft was written off.
- November 21, 2019: Turkish Airlines Flight 467, a Boeing 737-800 registered as TC-JGZ, suffered a nose gear collapse while attempting to land in heavy crosswinds at Odesa International Airport in Ukraine. All 142 passengers and crew were evacuated via the emergency slides injury-free. However, the aircraft was written off.

=== 2020s ===
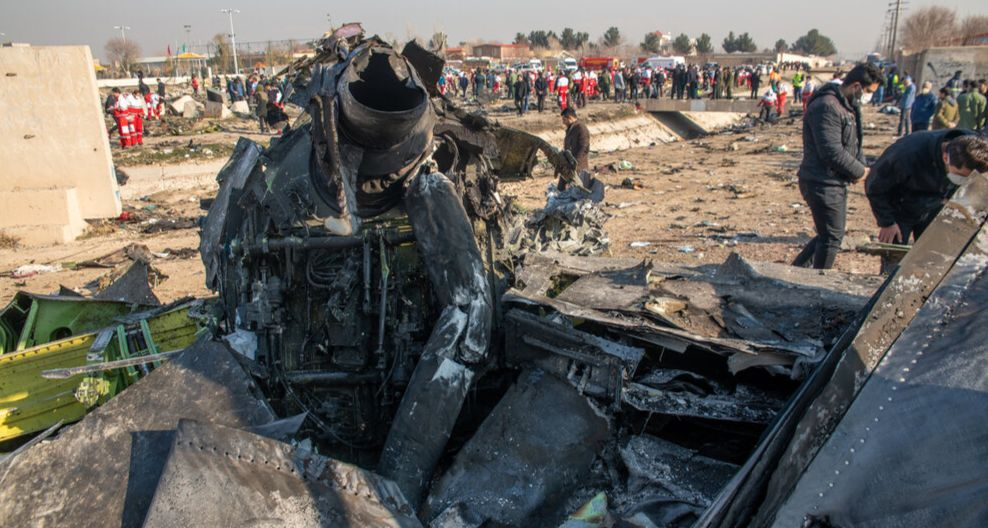
The wreckage of Ukraine International Airlines Flight 752

- January 8, 2020: Ukraine International Airlines Flight 752 operated by a Boeing 737-800, crashed shortly after taking off from Imam Khomeini International Airport in Tehran, Iran, bound for Kyiv, Ukraine. There were no survivors among the 167 passengers and 9 crew. On January 11, 2020, the Islamic Revolutionary Guard Corps admitted in a statement that they had 'unintentionally' shot down the plane because of human error.
- February 5, 2020: Pegasus Airlines Flight 2193 operated by a Boeing 737-800, on a flight from İzmir, skidded off the runway at Istanbul Sabiha Gökçen International Airport before splitting into three pieces of fuselage, leaving 3 dead and 179 injured.
- August 7, 2020: Air India Express Flight 1344, operated by a Boeing 737-800, overshot the runway during landing in heavy rain and crashed into a gorge at Calicut International Airport; both pilots and 19 passengers on board died.
- May 23, 2021: Ryanair Flight 4978, a 737-8AS registered SP-RSM, took off from Athens to Vilnius. Due to a false bomb report, a Belarusian Air Force MiG-29 was sent to escort the aircraft to Minsk, despite the fact that it was closer to Vilnius. One of the passengers, opposition activist Roman Protasevich, was subsequently arrested in Minsk, leading to accusations of Belarusian state terrorism.
- February 4, 2022: Sun Country Airlines Flight 110, operated by a Boeing 737-800 registered as N817SY, suffered a right main landing gear collapse during landing at Harry Reid International Airport. The aircraft was written off.
- March 21, 2022: China Eastern Airlines Flight 5735, operated by a Boeing 737-800, crashed while en route from Kunming Changshui International Airport to Guangzhou Baiyun International Airport. The aircraft was carrying 132 occupants, all of whom died.
- April 3, 2022: Malaysia Airlines Flight 2664, a Boeing 737-8H6, experienced a sudden malfunction in its pitot-static system, which caused the aircraft to give false speed readings. The first false instrument was given to the captain's side, the second one was given to the first officer side, both of them caused in-flight upset. The crew managed to land back at Kuala Lumpur International Airport with no fatalities among the 135 occupants.
- May 1, 2022: SpiceJet Flight 945, a 737-800 registered VT-SLH, flying from Mumbai to Durgapur encountered severe turbulence on approach, injuring 17 of the 195 people on board. One passenger eventually died from his injuries five months later.
- November 8, 2024: Qantas Flight 520, a Boeing 737 registered VH-VYH, suffered an uncontained engine failure during take-off and returned by performing a single-engine landing; none of the 181 occupants were injured.
- December 28, 2024: KLM Flight 1204, a Boeing 737-800 (registered as PH-BXM) flying from Oslo Gardermoen Airport to Amsterdam Schipol, experienced a hydraulic failure shortly after takeoff. The flight was diverted to Sandefjord Airport where the aircraft touched down. During roll out the aircraft veered to the right and went off the runway into a grassed sectioned. There were no injuries reported among the 182 occupants on board. Damage to the aircraft is currently unknown.
- December 29, 2024: Jeju Air Flight 2216, operated by a Boeing 737-800 registered as HL8088, crashed into a concrete embankment housing the ILS localizer array following a belly landing at Muan International Airport, South Korea. Out of the 181 occupants onboard, 179 were killed and 2 survived, making it the deadliest involving the Boeing 737 Next Generation.
- March 13, 2025: American Airlines Flight 1006, operated by a Boeing 737-800, originally headed for Dallas Fort Worth International Airport from Colorado Springs, caught fire after a precautionary landing at Denver International Airport, while taxiing to the gate. All 172 passengers and 6 crew members were evacuated, with 12 minor injuries reported.
- January 11, 2026: Arik Air Flight 740, a 737-700, suffered an uncontained left-engine failure. The leading edge of the wing and the engine were damaged and the aircraft made an emergency landing. All 80 passengers onboard survived and evacuated the aircraft.
- July 10, 2026: a Malta Air 737-800 registered 9H-QEU, operating as Ryanair Flight 1879 from Thessaloniki to Memmingen, suffered an uncontained engine failure, resulting in a window to blow out during climb, resulting in a passenger getting partially blown out of the window. The aircraft returned to Thessaloniki. The passenger was hospitalized.

== 737 MAX (MAX 7/8/200/9/10) ==
=== 2010s ===
- October 29, 2018: Lion Air Flight 610, a 737 MAX 8 registered as PK-LQP, on a flight from Jakarta, Indonesia to Pangkal Pinang, Indonesia, crashed into the sea 13 minutes after takeoff, with 189 people on board the aircraft: 181 passengers (178 adults and 3 children), as well as 6 cabin crew and two pilots. All on board died. This is the deadliest air accident involving all variants of the Boeing 737 and also the first fatal accident involving the Boeing 737 MAX.
- March 10, 2019: Ethiopian Airlines Flight 302, a 737 MAX 8 registered as ET-AVJ, on a flight from Addis Ababa Bole International Airport, Ethiopia to Jomo Kenyatta International Airport in Nairobi, Kenya, crashed six minutes after takeoff; all 157 people aboard (149 passengers and 8 crew members) died. The plane was only four months old at the time of the accident. In response, numerous aviation authorities around the world grounded the 737 MAX series, and many airlines followed suit on a voluntary basis. On March 13, 2019, the FAA became the last authority to ground the aircraft, reversing its previous stance that the MAX was safe to fly.

=== 2020s ===
- December 4, 2023: Ryanair Flight 1269, a 737 MAX 8-200 landing at Stansted Airport, dropped more than 2,000 feet (610 m) in only 17 seconds. The airline is reportedly cooperating with the AAIB. This incident may be still under investigation ? (This is due to date)
- January 5, 2024: Alaska Airlines Flight 1282, a 737 MAX 9 registered as N704AL, on a flight from Portland, Oregon to Ontario, California, experienced an explosive decompression shortly after take off, after the loss of an incorrectly installed door plug. The aircraft returned to Portland and landed. Some on board sustained minor injuries, but there were no deaths. The type was subsequently grounded for nearly a month. A preliminary report pointed to the conclusion that the four bolts that hold the door plug in place were missing at the time of the flight.
- May 25, 2024: Southwest Airlines Flight 746, a 737 MAX 8, experienced "an uncontrolled side-to-side yawing motion" called a Dutch roll at an elevation of 32,000 feet less than an hour after departing from Phoenix. The pilots were able to land the plane in Oakland safely. FAA investigations showed that a Power Controller Unit (PCU) for backup power control responsible for tail rudder movements was damaged. Further NTSB analysis reveals that prior to the event, the jet was parked outdoors during a strong storm with gusts up to 84 mph which could have caused the damage to the stabilizer ribs and standby power control unit.
- June 22, 2024: Korean Air Flight 189, a Boeing 737 MAX 8 operating from Incheon International Airport to Taichung International Airport, returned to Incheon after a pressurization-system fault was detected about 50 minutes after departure while the aircraft was over Jeju Island. During the subsequent descent, 15 passengers reported symptoms including eardrum pain and hyperventilation, and 13 were taken to hospital after landing. No serious injuries were reported.
- October 1, 2024: a Ryanair 737-8 MAX operating FR-846 from Barcelona, Spain to Milan Bergamo, Italy with 162 passengers onboard suffered a number of main tire failures upon landing. According to Italy's ANSV report among the probable causes there was an unintentional incorrect sequence of actions applied by the fight crew, even though the FC was on their first leg of the day, rest periods had been observed and they were aware the anti-skid system of the aircraft was inoperative.
- September 30, 2026: Flydubai Flight 1073, a 737 MAX 8, made an emergency landing at Prince Sultan bin Abdulaziz Airport in Tabuk, Saudi Arabia, following an attempted hijacking in which the first officer attacked and seriously injured the captain and attempted to seize control of the aircraft. Passengers and crew subdued the first officer, and a reserve Flydubai crew travelling aboard took control and landed the aircraft safely, with no fatalities. UAE authorities subsequently described the incident as an attempted terrorist act.

== See also ==
- Boeing 737 rudder issues
- Boeing 737 MAX groundings
