= XiamenAir Flight 8667 =

2018 aviation accident in the Philippines

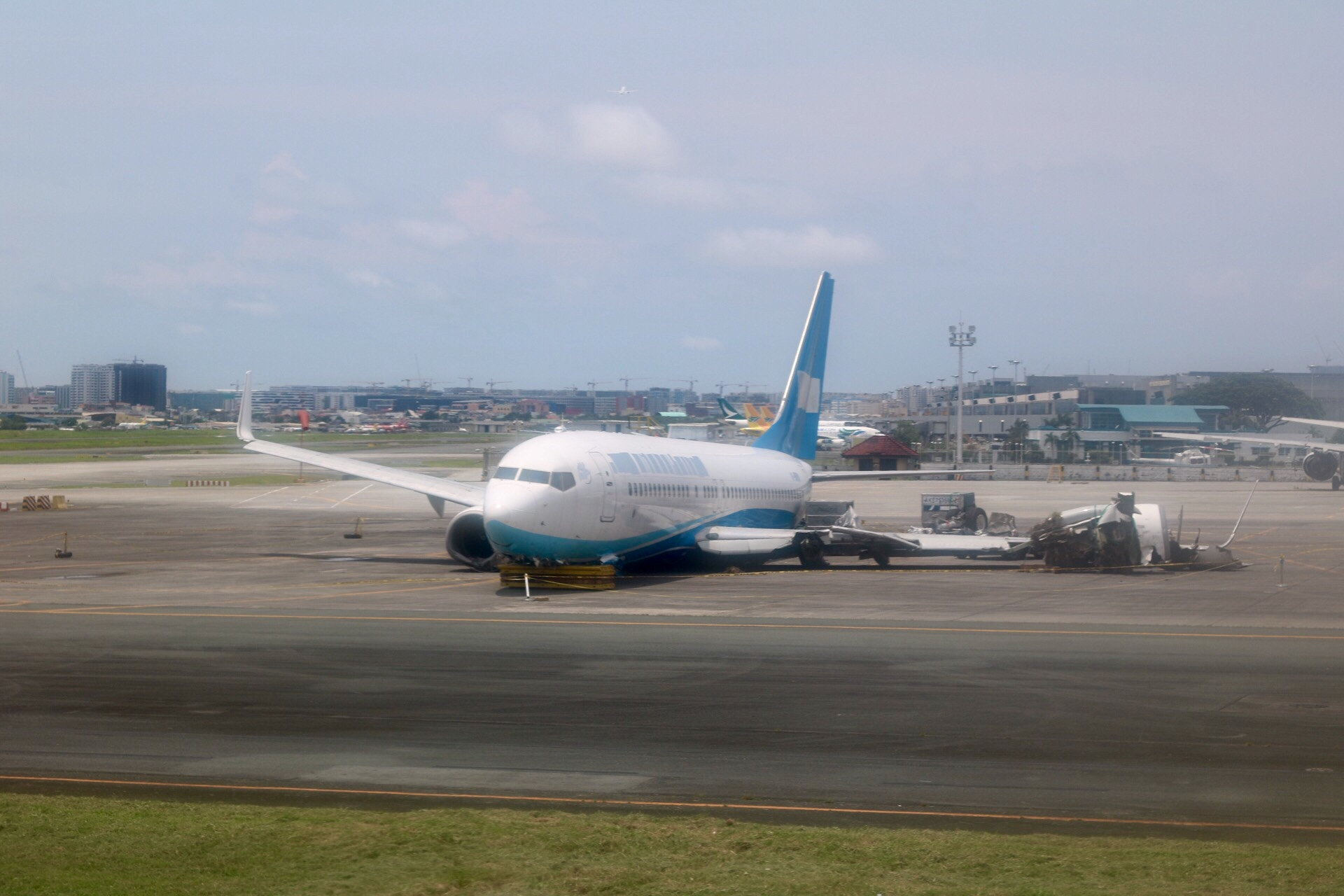
- Wreckage of the aircraft at Ninoy Aquino International Airport

Accident
- Date: 16 August 2018
- Summary: Runway excursion due to pilot error
- Site: Ninoy Aquino International Airport, Manila, Philippines; 14°30′23.7″N 121°0′59.1″E

Aircraft
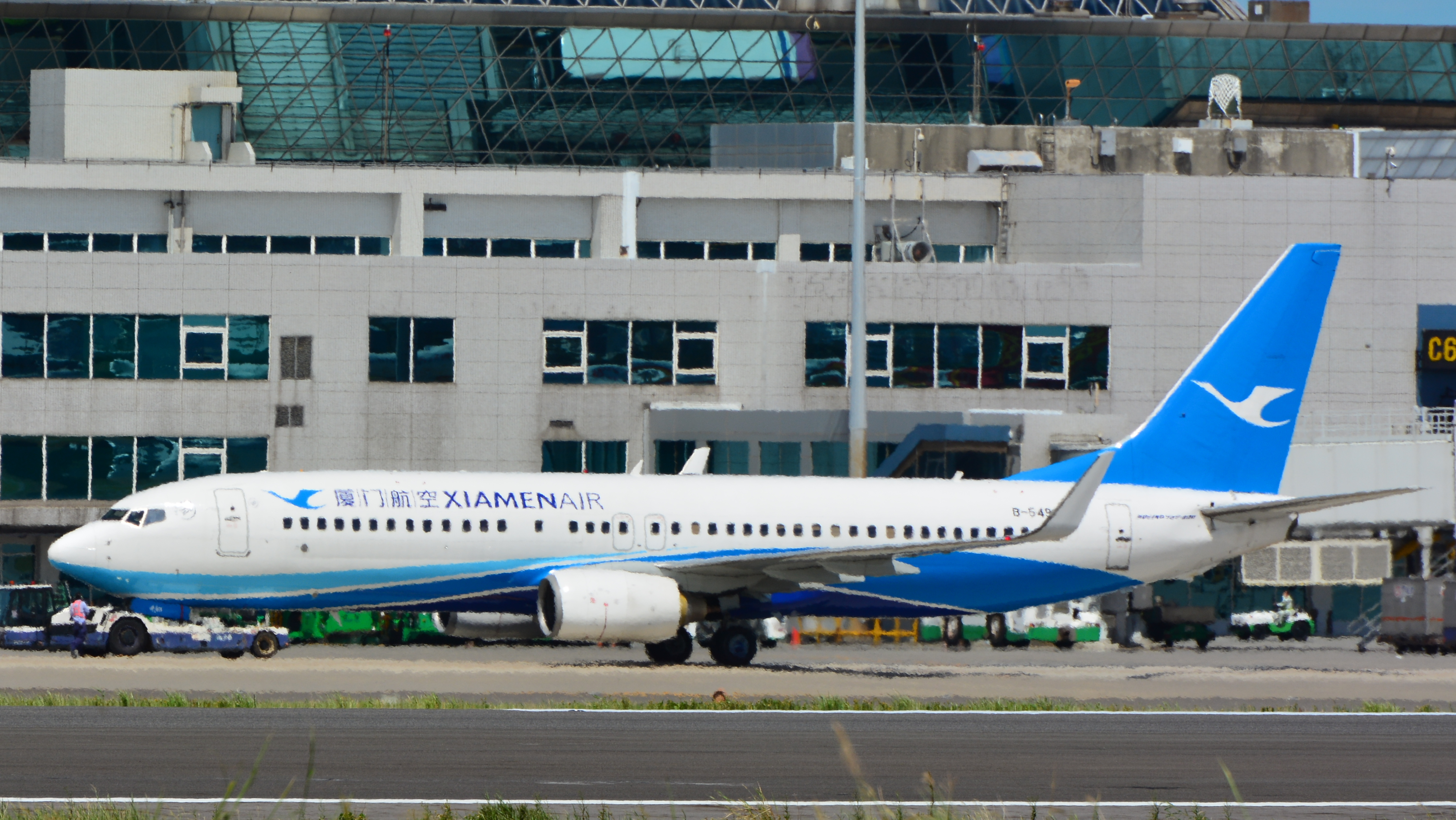
- B-5498, the aircraft involved in the accident, pictured in 2016
- Aircraft type: Boeing 737-85C (WL)
- Operator: XiamenAir
- IATA flight No.: MF8667
- ICAO flight No.: CXA8667
- Call sign: XIAMEN AIR 8667
- Registration: B-5498
- Flight origin: Xiamen Gaoqi International Airport, Xiamen, China
- Destination: Ninoy Aquino International Airport, Metro Manila, Philippines
- Occupants: 165
- Passengers: 157
- Crew: 8
- Fatalities: 0
- Survivors: 165

XiamenAir Flight 8667 was a scheduled international passenger flight from Xiamen Gaoqi International Airport in Xiamen, China, to Ninoy Aquino International Airport in Manila, Philippines. On August 16, 2018, the Boeing 737-800 operating this flight skidded off the runway while attempting to land in poor weather conditions. After leaving the runway, the aircraft struck nearby objects that tore off the left engine and the left main gear. The crash caused significant damage to the aircraft, but no serious injuries were reported among the crew or passengers. The damaged aircraft took 36 hours to remove from the runway, leading to a major disruption at the airport, the primary international gateway to the Philippines. The closure caused the cancellation of more than 200 domestic and international flights, affected more than 250,000 travelers, and prompted calls for enlargement of the airport or the construction of alternative airports to serve the country in the event of future disruptions.

After the accident, the flight crew told investigators that a torrential downpour had obstructed their view of the runway. The investigation revealed that even though the first officer of the aircraft had called for a go-around several times during the landing, the captain disregarded the calls and attempted to complete the landing despite not being able to clearly identify the runway. The investigation led to changes in airline policy relating to cockpit resource management, planning, and operations in poor weather conditions. It also led to runway improvements at the airport to remove objects near the runway that had caused most of the major damage to the aircraft.

== Accident ==
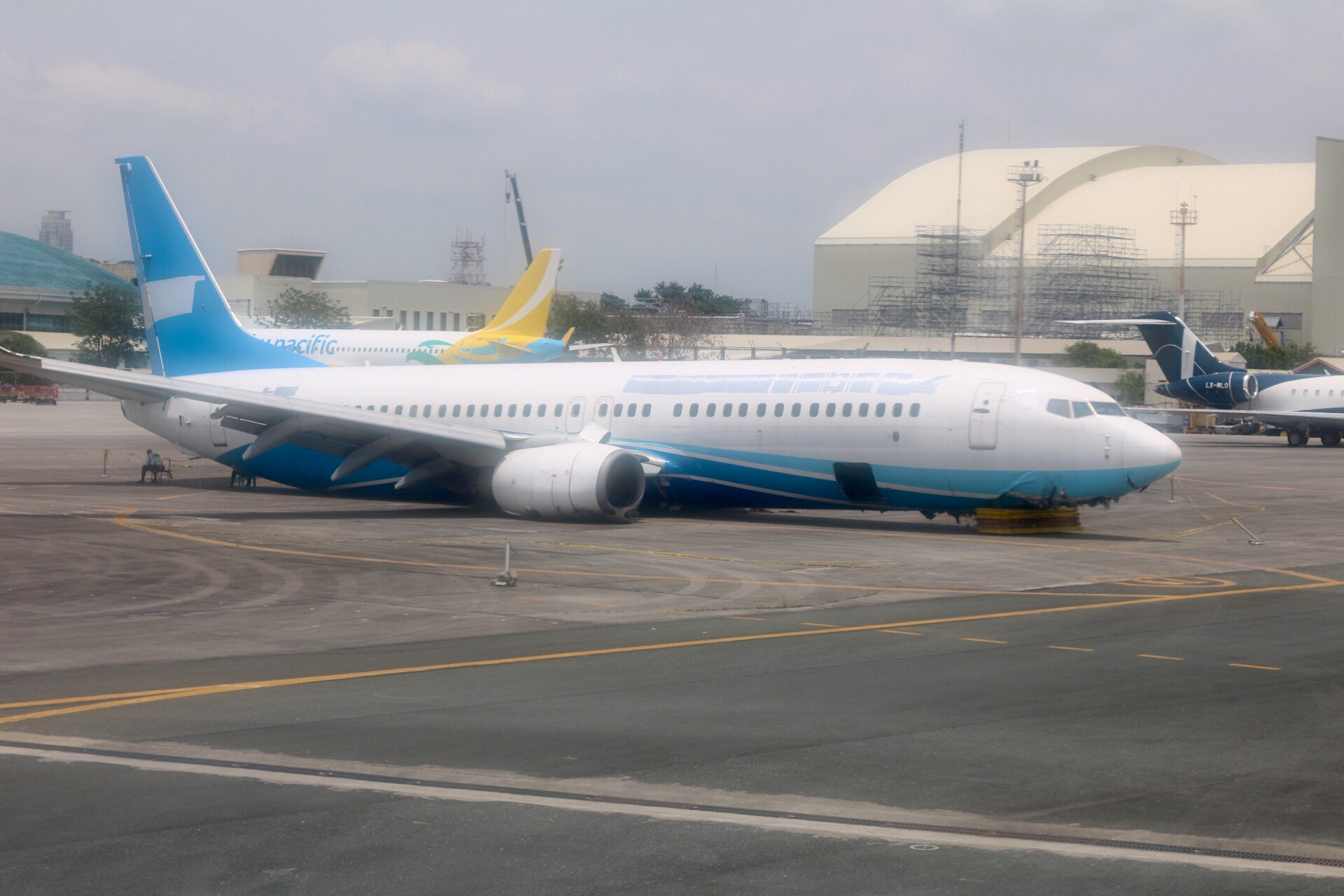
B-5498 from another angle

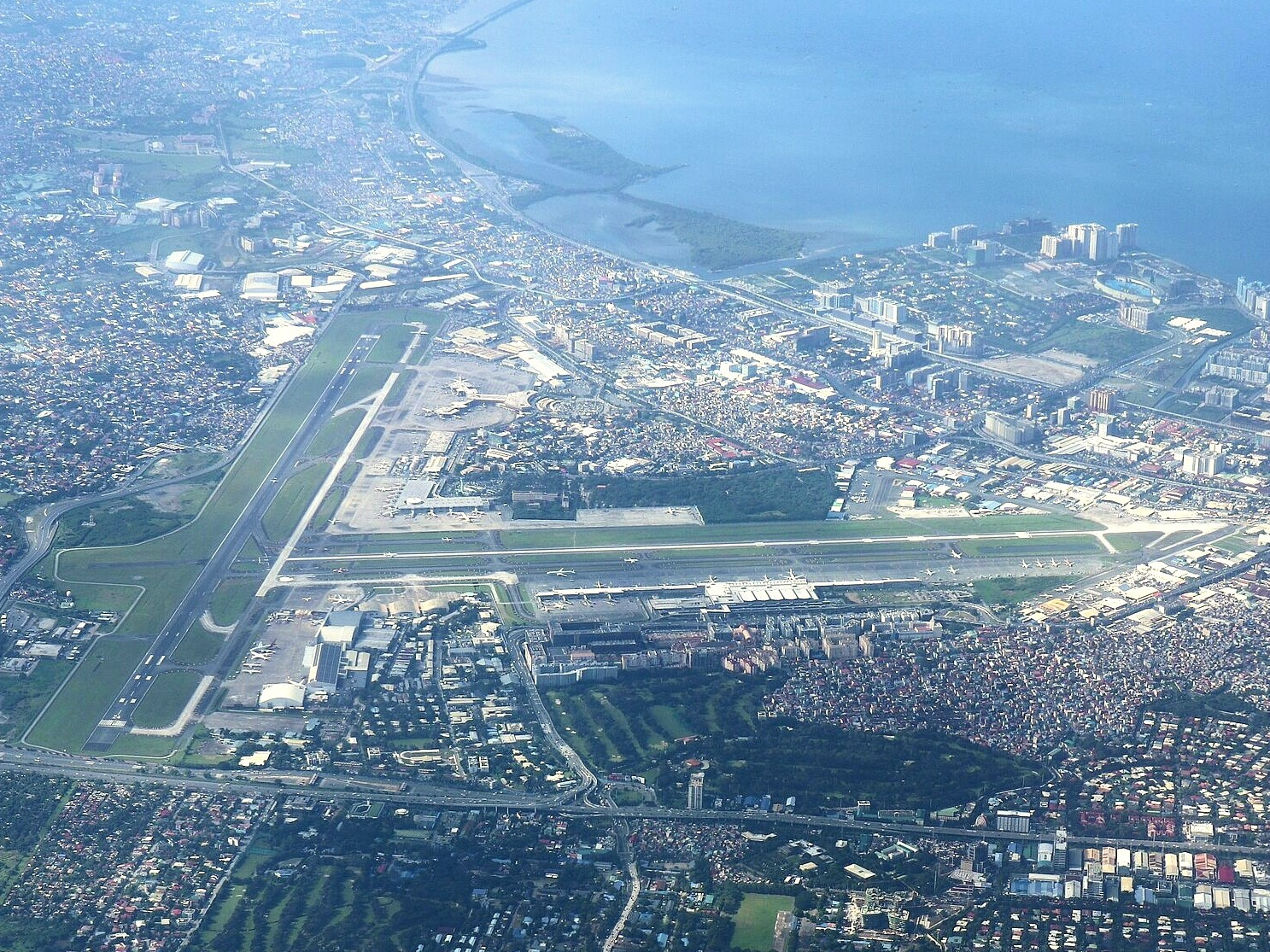
Ninoy Aquino International Airport from the air, looking east. Runway 24 is on the left edge of the image, running from the bottom to the top of the picture.

The aircraft, operating as flight number 8667, departed Xiamen, China, at 9:23 p.m. local time, bound for Manila, Philippines. MF 8667 was a regularly scheduled flight that operated daily flights between the two cities.

Upon arrival in the Manila airspace, the aircraft circled the area waiting for a break in the thunderstorms in the area. The high intensity centerline runway lights on runway 06/24, the airport's main runway for large jets, had been out of service since August 8 due to scheduled runway refurbishment. At 11:40 p.m. Philippine Standard Time (UTC+08:00), the pilots attempted to land, but after the aircraft had descended to 30 feet (9 m) above the ground, the pilots aborted the attempt because they did not have a clear view of the ground and surrounding area. After a discussion, the crew decided to make another landing attempt, and if was not successful, they agreed to divert to their planned alternate airport.

On the second attempt, the pilots were able to establish a stabilized approach to the runway with the landing gear lowered, flaps at 30 degrees, and the speed brake in the armed position. The aircraft stayed on its targeted course along the glide slope down to 50 feet (20 m). As the plane passed over the runway threshold, it began to veer to the left of center of the runway. The first officer called out "go-around", but the captain answered, "No". At 13 feet (4 m) above the ground, the aircraft rolled to the left and drifted to the left of the runway center line. The first officer made another call for a go-around, but the captain again responded, "No" and "It's Okay".

The aircraft touched down on Runway 24 to the left of the runway center line, 2,430 feet (741 m) from the threshold of the runway. After touching down, the speed brakes and the autobrakes deployed, but for an unknown reason, the autobrakes disengaged shortly afterward. Initial witnesses reported that the aircraft appeared to bounce during the landing, before veering off to the left. The plane rolled off the left edge of the runway and collided with several concrete electric junction boxes that were located in the grassy area beside the runway. The collision caused the left main gear and the left engine to be torn off of the aircraft. As the plane continued into the soft grassy ground to the side of the runway, the right main landing gear and the nose gear collapsed and were folded into the gear wheel wells.

The aircraft came to a complete stop 260 feet (80 m) to the left of the center of the runway, about 4,900 feet (1,500 m) down the runway from the threshold, at about 11:55 p.m. The collapse of the nose wheel caused the aircraft's internal and external communication systems to fail, so the first officer went to the main cabin to order the emergency evacuation. The cabin crew conducted the evacuation of the aircraft using emergency slides on the left and right front doors. All passengers and crew were able to evacuate the aircraft with no major injuries, and only a few reporting superficial scratches.

== Aftermath ==
When the tower controllers were unable to reach the aircraft after it landed, they called for the Manila International Airport Authority (MIAA) safety patrol to check the runway, where they found the disabled aircraft. MIAA dispatched its Rescue and Firefighting Division, and all available airport fire trucks were sent to the crash site. Twelve minutes after the accident, MIAA Airport Police arrived to secure the area, followed by MIAA's medical team to treat any injuries. After the passengers and crew were evacuated from the aircraft, they were taken to a holding area in the airport's Terminal 1. In the terminal, airport authorities set up a special lounge for disabled passengers, senior citizens, and passengers with infants. They provided bottled water and blankets to all passengers, and then the airline provided food to the passengers and crew before taking them to a hotel.

At 2:10 a.m., the investigative team arrived, led by the Director-General of the Civil Aviation Authority of the Philippines (CAAP), along with members of the Aircraft Accident Investigation and Inquiry Board. They set up a mobile command post and tents around the accident area. They gathered evidence and removed the flight data recorder from the aircraft, then unloaded the cargo and luggage from the plane. The investigative team spent four hours analyzing the scene before releasing the site to the cleanup crew. Interviews with the flight crew revealed that heavy rains obstructed the pilot's view of the runway during the landing, but the crew did not declare an emergency with air traffic control.

At 6:10 a.m., officials completed their investigation of the site, and the clean-up operation was able to begin. The initial plan was to raise the aircraft out of the mud using airbags, lower the gear, and tow the plane to a safe location. However, after raising the plane, the landing gear was found to be extensively damaged and unusable, so it was necessary to use a crane to remove the aircraft. Crews were also unable to remove the approximately four tons of fuel in the aircraft, because its fuel pump was damaged and an important valve was closed. MIAA was able to rent two cranes from a local company that could lift the damaged jet from the runway and place it on a flatbed truck. However, the delivery of the cranes and removal of the aircraft took another 26 hours, hindered by the muddy terrain, torrential rain, and lightning alerts. The damaged aircraft was taken to the Balagbag ramp near the airport's Terminal 3, where it was unloaded.

The International Civil Aviation Organization (ICAO) has safety standards that require no hazards or obstructions to either side of an active runway within 490 feet (150 m). Because the final resting place of the disabled aircraft was within that distance, Runway 06/24, the airport's main runway, had to remain closed for 36 hours until the cleanup and recovery was complete. The airport's other runway, Runway 13/31, is known as the Domestic Runway. At only 8,500 feet (2,600 m) long and 150 feet (45 m) wide, it is too short to handle widebody jets or many international flights. The closure of the runway caused the cancellation of more than 200 domestic and international flights, while 17 inbound flights had to be diverted to other airports including some as far away as Tokyo, Hong Kong, Bangkok, and Ho Chi Minh City. Airport authorities estimated that 250,000 passengers were affected by the closure and the related delays, cancellations, and diverted flights in the aftermath.

After the airport reopened, representatives from XiamenAir stated that they would send seven planes to Manila within the day to transport the nearly 2,000 XiamenAir passengers that had been stranded at the airport, and send a team to work with Philippine aviation authorities in the accident investigation. CAAP officials announced that the pilot and the first officer of the crashed plane had been barred from leaving the country pending the results of the accident investigation. A Philippine presidential spokesperson hinted at the possibility of criminal charges being filed against the pilot for reckless imprudence resulting in damages. However, a CAAP representative revealed that the pilot and first officer had been allowed to leave the country in the last week of August.

Four days after the accident, XiamenAir issued a statement apologizing to all of the airport passengers affected by the incident and pledging to assist Philippine authorities. The airline agreed to pay the costs of removing the aircraft and stated that they had provided more than 55,000 meals and water to the travelers that had been impacted by the closure of the airport. On August 22, MIAA announced that XiamenAir would have to pay MIAA at least 15 million Philippine pesos (US$280,000) to cover the costs of removing the damaged aircraft from the runway. The announcement added that that figure was only an initial estimate and left it up to affected passengers to file lawsuits to recover personal damages. Cebu Pacific and Philippine Airlines announced that they were considering lawsuits against XiamenAir for damages, revenue losses, and inconvenience from the accident. By the end of August the estimated fines had increased to ₱33 million (US$630,000). In October, officials announced that the airline had already paid half the fine, with the second payment expected shortly. A 2020 study in the Philippine Transportation Journal concluded that the overall cost to the Philippine economy from the accident amounted to ₱2.27 billion (US$43,100,000).

The accident and the closure of the airport led to calls to expand the airport or to construct or expand additional airports in the region to prevent similar economic disruptions if a similar incident were to occur in the future. Those proposals included the construction of a new terminal for Clark International Airport to increase passenger capacity, the expansion of Ninoy Aquino International Airport with new terminals and runways, and the construction of a new international airport at Bulakan, Bulacan. In addition, Senator Dick Gordon stressed the need to reopen the closed Subic Bay International Airport to relieve congestion at NAIA.

== Background ==
=== Aircraft ===
The aircraft involved was a Boeing 737-85C (WL), registration B-5498 with Manufacturer Serial Number 37574 and line number 3160. It was powered by two CFM International CFM56-7B24 turbofan engines and first flew on January 14, 2010. Investigators found that the maintenance records of the aircraft showed that it had been maintained in accordance with Boeing standards and that it had a valid and current certificate of airworthiness at the time of the accident. After the accident, the aircraft was written off and scrapped.

=== Passengers and crew ===
At the time of the incident, the aircraft contained 157 passengers, 5 cabin crew members, an air security officer, and the two pilots. There were no serious injuries resulting from the accident, but some passengers suffered superficial scratches.

The captain of the aircraft was a Korean man who was 50 years old and had 16,000 hours of flight experience, with 7,000 hours on the Boeing 737-800 aircraft type. The first officer was a Chinese man, 28 years old, with a total of 950 flying hours, including 750 hours on the Boeing 737-800 aircraft type. At the time of the flight, the captain was the pilot flying the aircraft.

== Investigation ==
CAPP officials began the investigation of the accident shortly after the accident. Investigators retrieved the aircraft's flight data recorder and cockpit voice recorder and interviewed the flight crew. By August 24, the two recorders had been taken to Singapore to have them decoded to attempt to determine the cause of the accident. By August 31, investigators in Manila had received voice transcripts and data readouts from the recorders. They announced that they expected a final report on the accident to be released soon. In October, CAAP officials stated that they expected to have a final report by November.

On August 19, Senator Grace Poe called for the Senate to investigate the aftermath of the accident to determine whether the airport was prepared for such an emergency and to get an explanation of why it took 36 hours to remove the disabled aircraft. She also said she was concerned about the crowded conditions in the airport terminals and how passengers were forced to endure significant delays without the airlines offering enough water and meals. During hearings on August 29, authorities identified several lapses in the airport's response, including delays in obtaining high-capacity cranes, failing to provide meals to stranded passengers, and a lack of training to prepare for this type of incident.

In an undated executive summary of the accident investigation released to the public on August 8, 2019, CAAP concluded that the accident was caused by the decision of the captain to proceed with the landing of an un-stabilized approach with insufficient visual reference. It also found that the captain did not apply sound crew resource management practices when he disregarded the first officer's call for a go-around. The investigation found that factors contributing to the accident included the crew's failure to discuss strategies for dealing with inclement weather, crosswind conditions, the possibility of low-level wind shear, and NOTAM information on runway lights that were out of service. It found that the airline policy was inadequate on the procedure of go-arounds and found design and construction violations on the runway that left uneven surfaces and concrete obstacles. CAAP made recommendations for the XiamenAir to strengthen company policies of actions that must be taken by a pilot once a call out of "Go-Around" is made by the pilot monitoring, including establishing no fault "Go-Around" policies and ensuring that crews receive sufficient training on the policies. The report also recommended that the airport review and update its disabled aircraft removal plan and ensure that its equipment is sufficient for current operations at the airport.

== Legacy ==
As a result of the accident, XiamenAir revised its flight crew policies on how to handle go-around situations. The airline added training for rainy and wet runways during nighttime operations to its initial and recurrent simulator training program for Boeing 737 pilots. It also amended its policies to prohibit takeoffs and landings during heavy rains and prohibited landings in moderate rains during night flights when the runway center line light is not working or not available. In addition, it revised its safety standards and training regimens to increase daily communication and cooperation between Chinese and non-Chinese pilots. Officials at the airport performed upgrades to the runway to remove the concrete electrical junction box obstructions and to perform other rehabilitations.

== See also ==
- List of accidents and incidents involving the Boeing 737
- List of accidents and incidents involving commercial aircraft
