= Continental Airlines Flight 1404 =

2008 aviation accident in Colorado

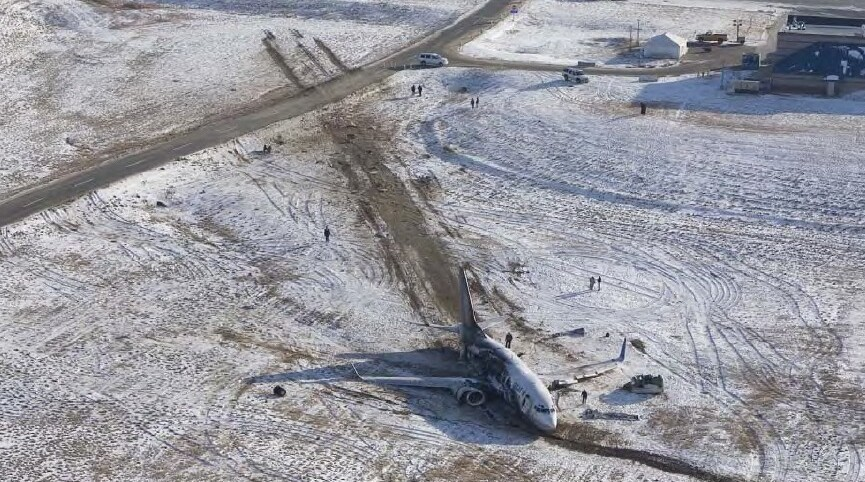
- Aerial view of the aircraft wreckage

Accident
- Date: December 20, 2008
- Summary: Runway excursion due to abnormal wind gust
- Site: Denver International Airport, Denver, Colorado, United States; 39°52′30″N 104°41′13.24″W

Aircraft
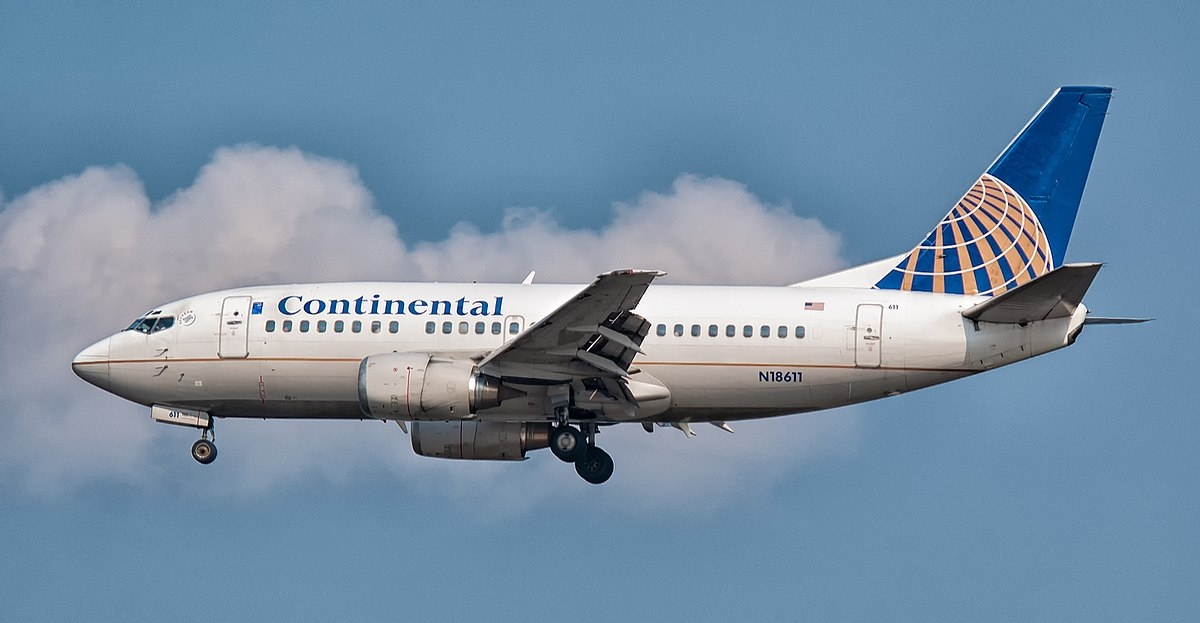
- N18611, the aircraft involved in the accident, pictured in 2006 (Note: Winglets were added in November 2008.)
- Aircraft type: Boeing 737-524 (Note: The aircraft was a Boeing 737-500; Boeing assigned a unique code for each company that buys one of its aircraft, which is applied as an infix to the model number at the time the aircraft is built, hence "737-524" designates a 737-500 built for Continental Airlines (customer code 24).)
- Operator: Continental Airlines
- IATA flight No.: CO1404
- ICAO flight No.: COA1404
- Call sign: CONTINENTAL 1404
- Registration: N18611
- Flight origin: Denver International Airport, Denver, Colorado, United States
- Destination: George Bush Intercontinental Airport, Houston, Texas, United States
- Occupants: 115
- Passengers: 110
- Crew: 5
- Fatalities: 0
- Injuries: 38
- Survivors: 115

Continental Airlines Flight 1404 was a Continental Airlines domestic flight from Denver International Airport in Denver, Colorado, to George Bush Intercontinental Airport in Houston, Texas. On the evening of December 20, 2008, the flight crashed while taking off from Denver, resulting in two critical injuries, 36 noncritical injuries, and a hull loss of the Boeing 737-500 aircraft.

== Aircraft ==
The aircraft involved was a Boeing 737-524, MSN 27324, registered as N18611, first flew on May 31, 1994, and in its 14 years of service, it had logged approximately 21511 takeoff and landing cycles. It was manufactured in 1994 and equipped with two CFM International CFM56-3B1 engines.

== Accident ==
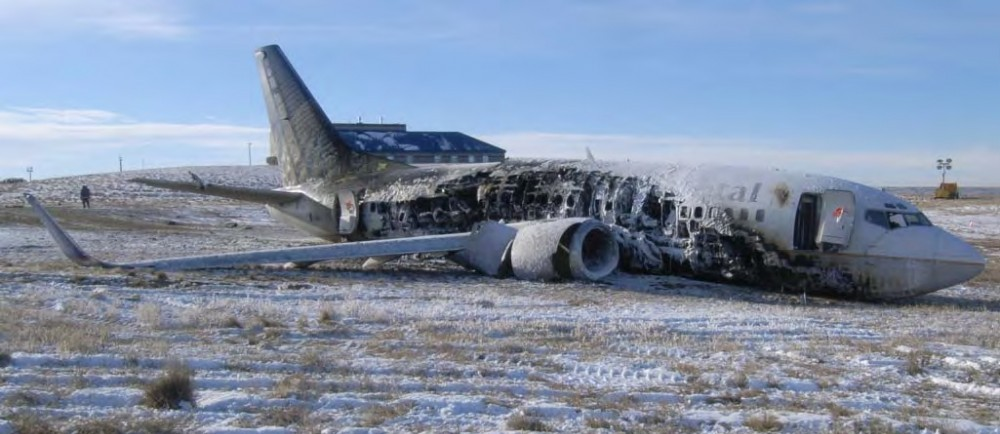
The right side of the aircraft wreckage

On Saturday, December 20, 2008, around 18:18 (06:18 pm) local time, after being cleared for takeoff on runway 34R at Denver International Airport, the Boeing 737-524 aircraft veered off the side of the runway before taxiway WC (less than 4,000 feet (1,200 m) from the threshold), skidded across the taxiway and a service road, and crashed in a 40-foot-deep (12 m) ravine several hundred yards from the runway. The right engine caught fire and the fire spread to the fuselage.

Despite early confusion as to the whereabouts of Flight 1404, firefighters were on scene relatively quickly, as the aircraft came to rest near one of the airport's four fire houses. When they arrived, most of the right side of the plane was on fire, while passengers were climbing out of the left side, being assisted by flight attendants and one off-duty Continental Airlines pilot in the cabin, the latter making several trips in and out of the wreckage to ensure everyone was safely out of the aircraft. The off-duty pilot, Richard Lowe, was part of the crew who had flown the incident aircraft into Denver; an Air Force reservist, Lowe was awarded the Airman's Medal for his actions.

The aircraft sustained severe damage. The fuselage was cracked just behind the wings, the number 1 engine and main landing gear were sheared off, and the nose gear collapsed. The fire caused overhead luggage compartments to melt onto seats.

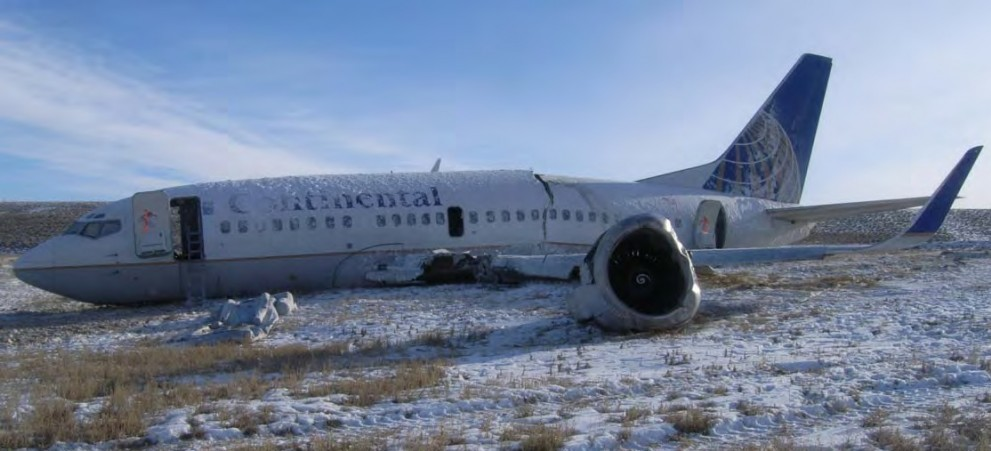
The left side of the aircraft wreckage

The crash is noted as the most serious incident in Denver International Airport's history. The aircraft was subsequently written off.

=== Injuries ===
Of the 110 passengers and 5 crew on board, 38 sustained injuries, including broken bones, though everyone on board survived. Two passengers and one of the crew were critically injured, though both passengers' conditions were upgraded that evening. By the following morning, fewer than seven people remained hospitalized.

50-year-old Captain David Butler was among the critically injured. He was hospitalized with serious back injuries and bone fractures. The first officer, 34-year-old Chad Levang, received minor injuries.

== Investigation ==
The aircraft's black boxes (data and sound) were recovered from the wreckage in usable condition. The cockpit voice recorder did not reveal any apparent problem until 41 seconds after the aircraft's brakes were released, just before takeoff. At that point, a bumping or rattling sound could be heard, and the crew aborted the takeoff four seconds later. Both recorders stopped working six seconds after that (before the plane came to a stop). At one point during the sequence, the plane's speed reached 119 knots (220 km/h; 137 mph).

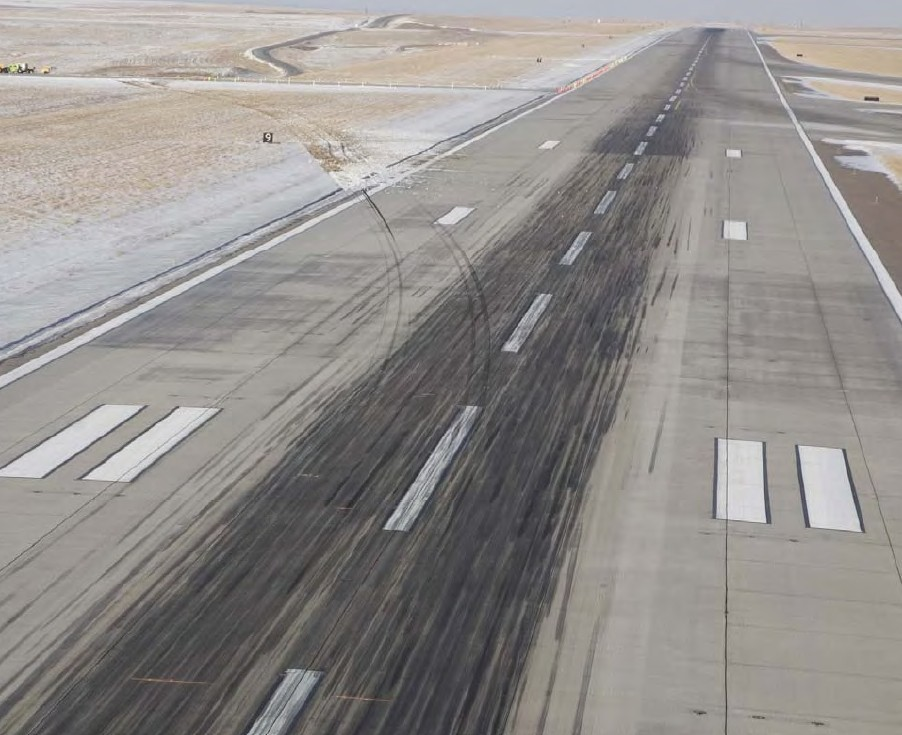
The visible skid marks made by Flight 1404

When interviewed, First Officer Levang told investigators that he was unaware of any problem until the plane was traveling between 87 and 90 knots (161 and 167 km/h; 100 and 104 mph), when it moved away from the runway's centerline and made a "sudden left turn." He indicated that Captain Butler, who was too badly injured to interview with officials when the investigation began, was flying at the time. Both the captain and first officer had clean safety records when the crash occurred and were experienced pilots.

Wheel marks left on the ground, and initial reports from passengers and firefighters indicate that the plane was airborne briefly. When during the sequence the fire started is unclear. No snow or ice was on the runway, but 31-knot (57 km/h; 36 mph) crosswinds were happening at the time.

The flight crew who flew the aircraft to Denver prior to the incident flight was also on board, though not on duty, and reported having no difficulties with the plane during their previous flight. It had suffered an engine failure and subsequent emergency landing in 1995, after which both engines were replaced, but was otherwise undamaged in that incident.

Initial speculation suggested that the plane could have suffered a landing gear malfunction that might have resulted in a wheel lockup during the takeoff roll, leading to the runway excursion. National Transportation Safety Board (NTSB) officials said that when the takeoff began, the aircraft's engines appeared to be functioning properly, its tires were inflated, and the brakes did not appear as if they had failed or otherwise malfunctioned, concluding that the landing gear did not cause any problems.

On July 17, 2009, focus had shifted to a possible large gust of wind or a patch of ice. Captain David Butler stated: "My speculation is that we either got a big, nasty gust of wind or that, with the controls we had in, we hit some ice." He also stated that he stopped pushing on rudder controls because they had stopped working. The winds were reported at about 24 to 27 knots (44 to 50 km/h; 28 to 31 mph) from the northwest with gusts up to nearly 32 knots (59 km/h; 37 mph) just before the airliner began its takeoff roll northward down a north–south runway. The 737 has a crosswind limitation for takeoff of 33 knots (61 km/h; 38 mph) on a dry runway.

Contrary to the "average" wind data reported to the incident pilots, the NTSB investigation found that a sensor at one end of the runway showed a crosswind of 40 knots (74 km/h; 46 mph), with analysis showing the airplane was hit with a peak gust crosswind of 45 knots (83 km/h; 52 mph). In addition to being much higher than the data reported to the pilots as they prepared for takeoff, this was also much higher than the airline industry used in pilot training. The NTSB also received a report analyzing 250,327 departures involving 737-500s and found that only four of those departures (less than 0.002%) had experienced a crosswind above 30 knots (56 km/h; 35 mph), meaning that for a commercial pilot to have real-life experience with crosswinds anywhere near the velocity that hit Continental Airlines Flight 1404 that day was nearly impossible. The NTSB believes that this is why the pilot believed that his rudder controls were not working, deciding not to push the rudder anymore and to focus instead on other inadequate remedies to the situation.

On July 13, 2010, the NTSB published that the probable cause of this accident was the captain's cessation of right rudder input, which was needed to maintain directional control of the airplane, about four seconds before the excursion, when the airplane encountered a strong and gusty crosswind – with a contributing factor of inadequate crosswind training for extreme wind gusts in the airline industry. A further contributing factor was no requirement for the air traffic control system to provide sufficient wind information to the air traffic controllers (ATCs) and pilots. In response to the NTSB report, the Federal Aviation Administration required the airline industry to adjust the crosswind training protocols for pilots, and required ATCs to provide multiple sources of wind information, rather than averages, to pilots.

== Dramatization ==
The crash of Continental Airlines Flight 1404 was covered in Runway Runoff, a season-19 (2019) episode of the internationally syndicated Canadian TV documentary series Mayday.

== See also ==
- List of accidents and incidents involving commercial aircraft
- Aviation safety
