= All Nippon Airways Flight 140 =

2011 aviation incident in Japan

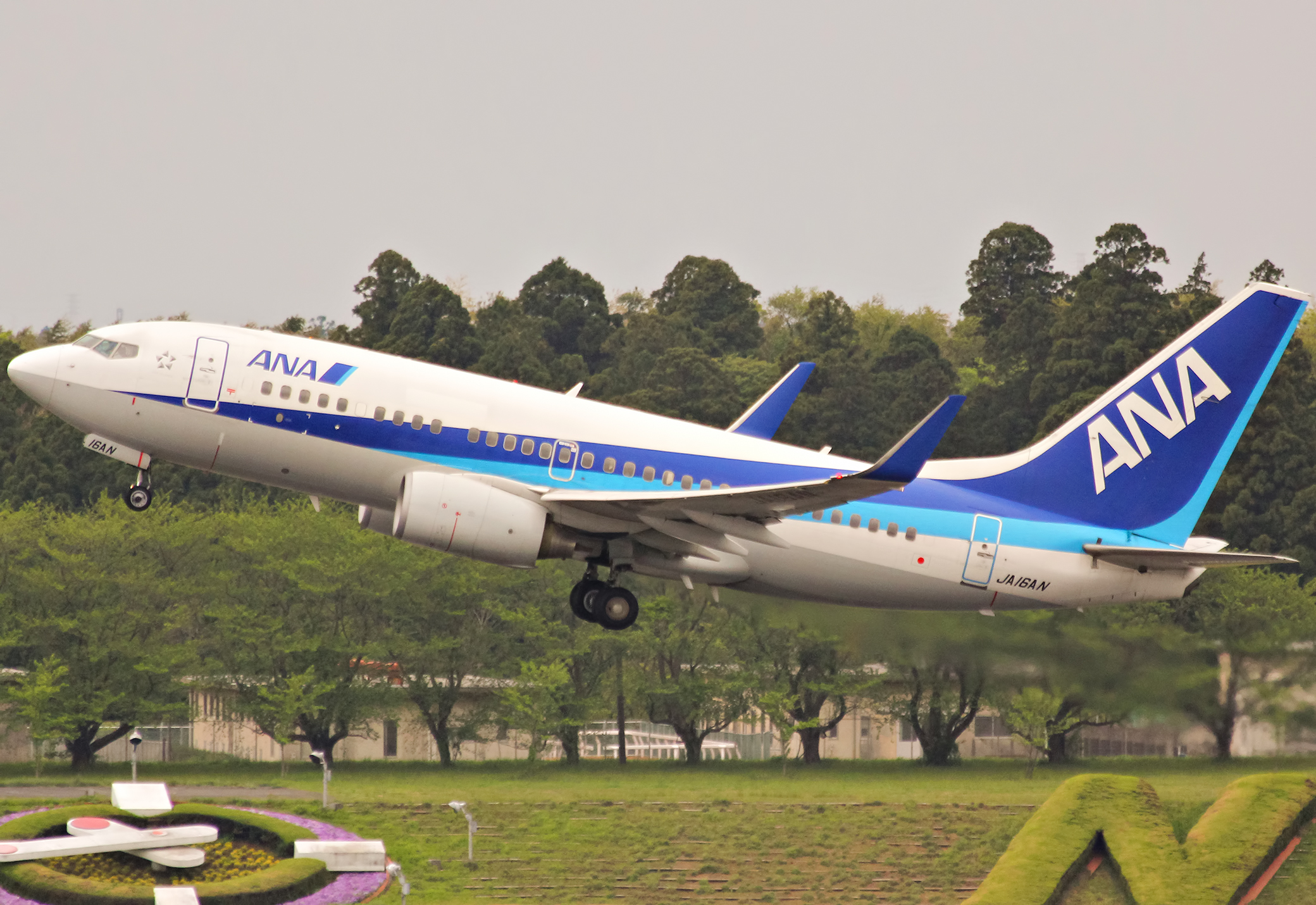
- JA16AN, the aircraft involved, photographed in 2013

Incident
- Date: 6 September 2011
- Summary: In-flight upset due to pilot error
- Site: 128 kilometers east of Kushimoto, Wakayama, Japan

Aircraft
- Aircraft type: Boeing 737-781
- Operator: All Nippon Airways
- IATA flight No.: NH140
- ICAO flight No.: ANA140
- Call sign: ALL NIPPON 140
- Registration: JA16AN
- Flight origin: Naha Airport, Naha, Okinawa Prefecture, Japan
- Destination: Haneda Airport, Ōta, Tokyo, Japan
- Occupants: 117
- Passengers: 112
- Crew: 5
- Fatalities: 0
- Injuries: 2
- Survivors: 117

All Nippon Airways Flight 140 was a scheduled domestic passenger flight en route from Naha Airport to Haneda Airport. On 6 September 2011, the plane experienced an in-flight upset over the coast of Kushimoto, Wakayama Prefecture, inverting upside down and diving steeply. Two of the 117 on board were injured, but there were no fatalities.

== Background ==
=== Aircraft ===
The aircraft involved was a Boeing 737-781, manufactured on January 11, 2008 and registered as JA16AN. It was powered with two CFMI CFM56-7B engines. Before the incident, it had a total flight hours of 7,968 hours.

=== Crew ===
The captain was a 64-year-old man. He had 16,518 flight hours, 64 of which on the Boeing 737.

The co-pilot was a 38-year-old man. He had 2,930 flight hours, 197 of which on the Boeing 737. He previously had flown on the Boeing 737-500 from January 24, 2007 to May 8, 2011 and just switched to the Boeing 737-700 on June 10, 2011.

In that flight, the captain was the pilot flying and the co-pilot was the pilot monitoring.

== Incident ==
At 21:15, Flight 140 took off from Naha Airport and was cruising at an altitude of 41,000 feet (12,500 meters). At 22:46:42, the captain left the cockpit to use the restroom. At 22:48:04, air traffic control instructed the aircraft to change course and the co-pilot performed the operation. During that, the captain returned from the restroom and signaled to re-enter the cockpit. The co-pilot accidentally turned the rudder trim switch instead of the door-lock selector, which caused the plane to bank to the left, reaching a maximum left bank of 131.7° degrees. The aircraft then entered a steep dive, plunging down 6,000 feet, reaching 2.68 G's. The co-pilot was able to regain control of the aircraft at 35,000 feet (10,700 meters). The captain returned to the cockpit and took over the controls. The crew requested to maintain 36,000 feet. At around 23:30, the crew landed at Haneda Airport without further incident. Two cabin crew members sustained minor injuries: one with a sprained neck and one with scratches; and were transported to a local hospital. There were no fatalities among the 117 passengers and crew as the passengers were all wearing seatbelts.

In an interview after the incident, the captain said that he was unable to stand during the rapid descent and that he heard an alarm sound from the cockpit. Many passengers did not realize that the aircraft had experienced an upset due to flying at night with no visual references out the window.

== Investigation ==
The Japan Transport Safety Board (JTSB) conducted the investigation. The cockpit voice recorder (CVR) had been overwritten due to its 30-minute recording time limit and thus no data could be recovered from it.

=== Similarities between two switches ===
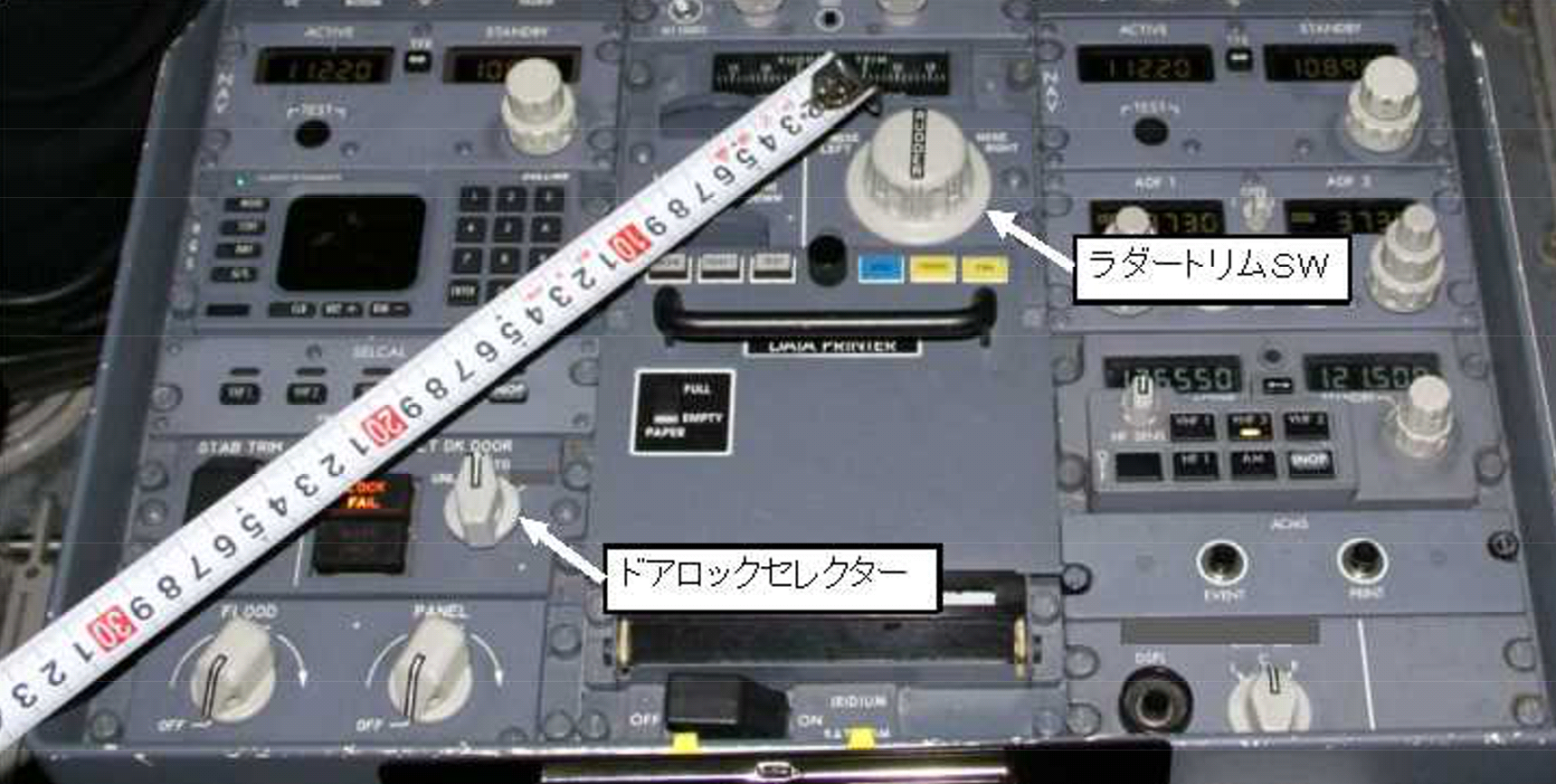
Location of door-lock selector and rudder trim switch on the B737-700

Analysis of the data revealed that the upset was caused by the co-pilot mistaking the door-lock selector for the rudder trim switch as the captain requested access back into the flight deck. The two switches differed in shape and size, but were similar in their operation and the angle of rotation.

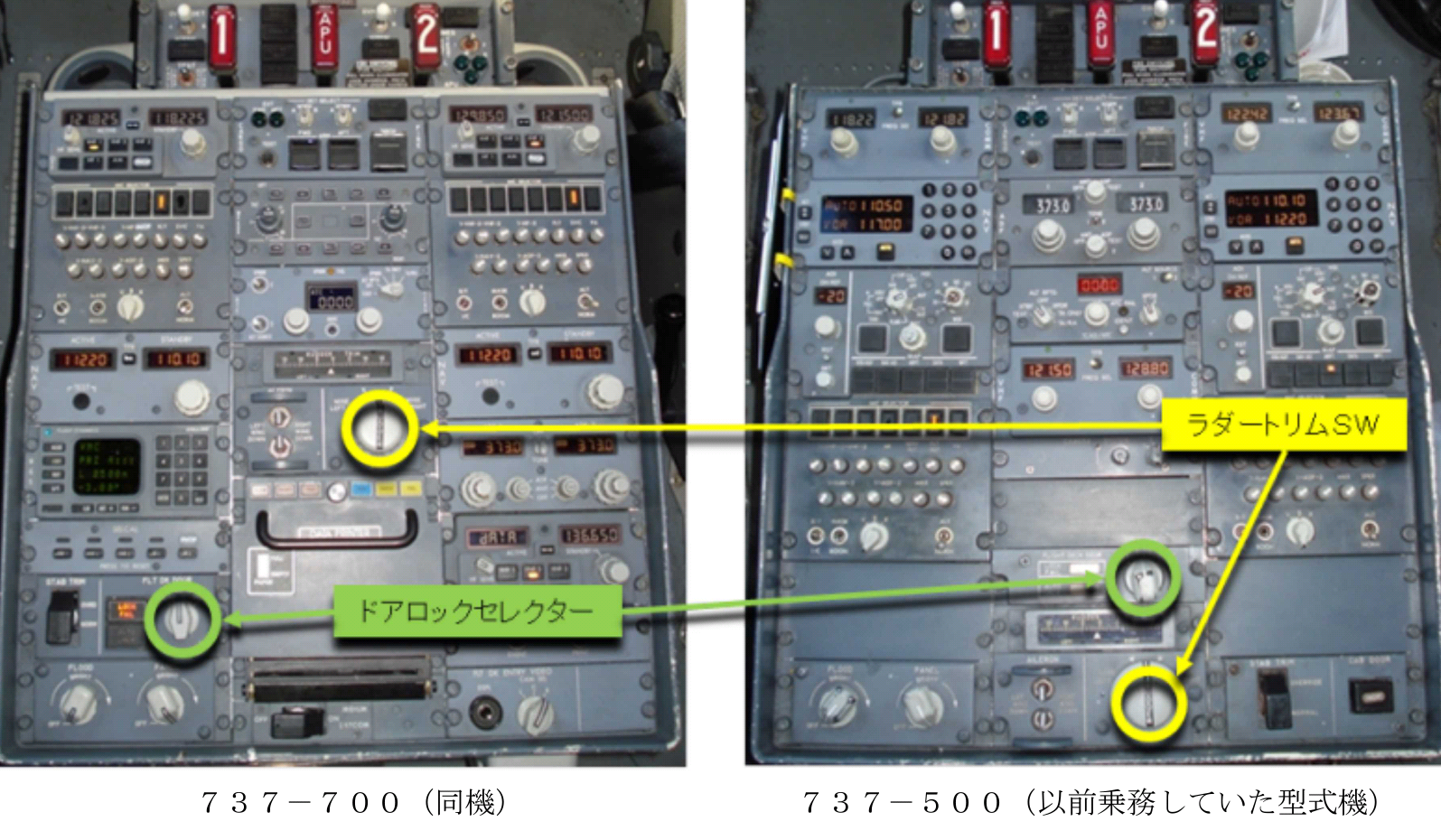
The placement of the door-lock selector and rudder trim switch on the B737-500 and B737-700.

Manufacturers placed the switches on the assumption that "the Boeing 737-500 shall be retired in the future" and "pilots shall not be on duty aboard both type aircraft in the same period of time." As a result, considering the constraints of available space on the panel and the differences in pilots' physiques, in which it is thought the commonality of the two types may cause adverse feelings, they decided to place the rudder trim switch as far as possible.

=== Training ===
Although the co-pilot had completed training to differentiate between the Boeing 737-500 and the Boeing 737-700, the similarities between the two switches were not taught in-depth by the instructor during his training sessions. This lack of training on different cockpit switches may have caused the co-pilot to become unfamiliar with the switches found on different aircraft. As well, the simulator training sessions only involved recovering from inflight upsets below 10,000 feet (3,000 meters) and the activation of stall warnings was not anticipated. Furthermore, no training had been conducted to simulate an aircraft emergency with only one crew member present in the cockpit.

=== Report ===
On September 25, 2014, the JTSB issued the final report stating the cause of the incident.

The report attributed the incident to the co-pilot mistaking the door-lock selector for the rudder trim switch. The action prevented the autopilot from maintaining the aircraft's altitude causing the aircraft to bank and dive sharply. It was also found that the similar design of the two switches may have confused the co-pilot. The inappropriate action was presume to have occurred because the stick shaker unexpectedly activated during the recovery maneuvers, which made the co-pilot to be surprised and confused. The co-pilot had not been trained to handle situations where the stick shaker would activate at high altitudes.

The report revealed that the stick shaker had activated multiple times (in contradiction to the simulator training that the pilot trained on, which had no stick shaker or stall warning activation).

=== Safety recommendations ===
The JTSB issued several safety recommendations as a result of the incident:

1. improve inflight upset recovery training practices to flight crews
2. airlines be required to conduct inflight upset recovery training from various altitudes
3. improve the design and placement of cockpit switches and dials.

Specifically, the JTSB issued safety recommendations to airlines, the Ministry of Land, Infrastructure, Transport and Tourism, and the Federal Aviation Administration (FAA). The recommendations called on All Nippon Airways and the Ministry of Land, Infrastructure, Transport and Tourism to improve their training and recovery procedures. The recommendations suggested that airlines be required to conduct recovery training from abnormal attitudes. The JTSB also issued a safety recommendation to the FAA, calling on it to instruct Boeing to consider improving the similarity of its switches.

== Reaction ==
On September 28, 2011, All Nippon Airways (ANA) held a conference to apologize. The company has offered refunds for tickets following the incident. An ANA official said: "The figures are unbelievable, even in a case that requires such an urgent maneuver to avert a risk."

Experts said that "It's usually impossible for a passenger airplane to fly in such a position" and that "it could have led to a serious accident."

== See also ==
- United Airlines Flight 585
- USAir Flight 427
- Eastwind Airlines Flight 517
- Northwest Airlines Flight 85
