= Hull loss =

Aviation accident that damages the aircraft beyond economical repair

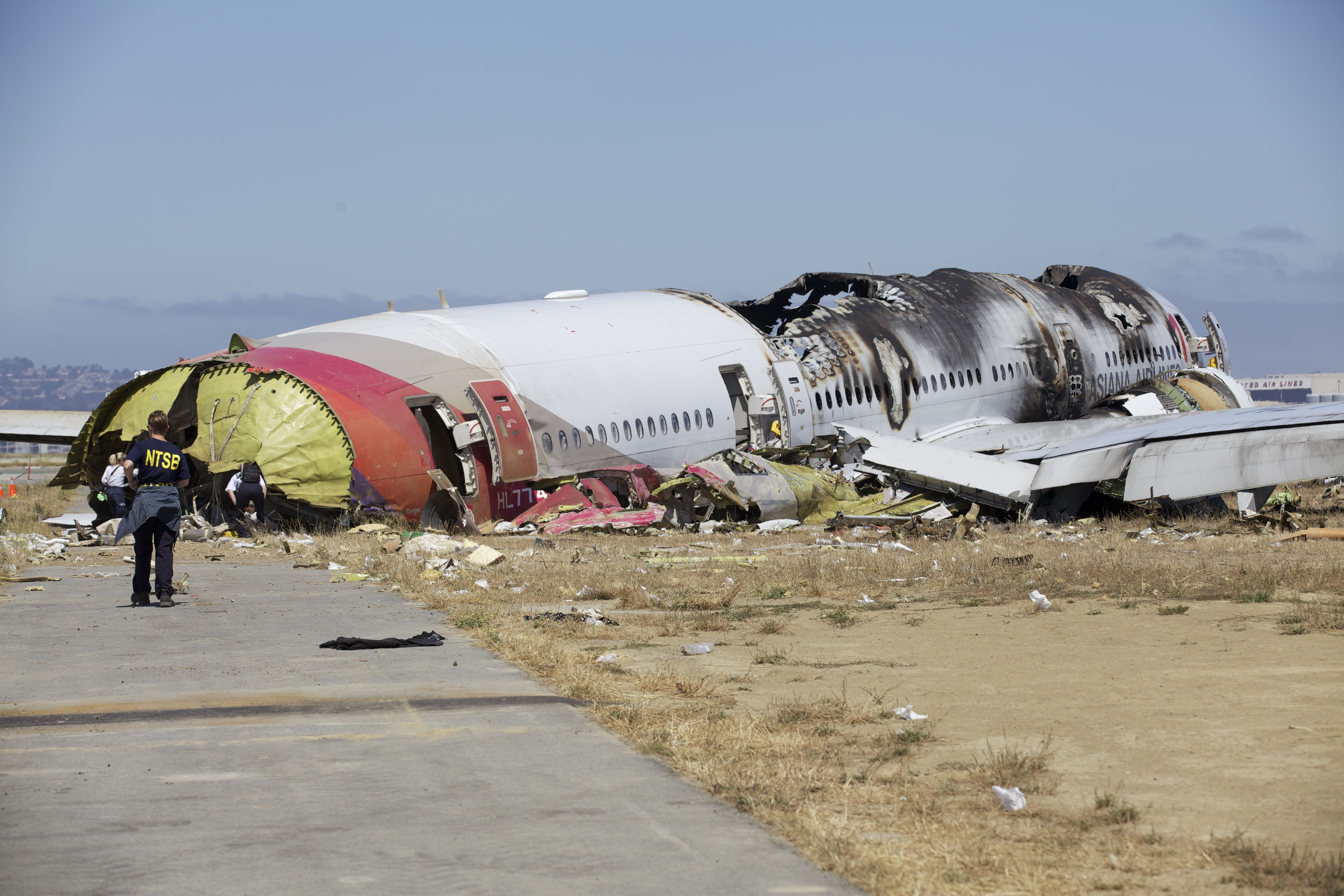
Wreckage of Asiana Airlines Flight 214—a Boeing 777-200ER—lying at San Francisco International Airport

A hull loss is an aviation accident that damages the aircraft beyond economic repair, resulting in a total loss. The term also applies to situations where the aircraft is missing, the search for its wreckage is terminated, or the wreckage is logistically inaccessible.

The aviation industry uses the metric of "hull losses per 100,000 flight departures" to measure the relative risk of a given flight or aircraft. There is no official ICAO or NTSB definition.

From 1959 to 2006, 384 of 835 hull losses were non-fatal.

A constructive hull loss takes into account other incidental expenses beyond repair, such as salvage, logistical costs of repairing non-airworthy aircraft within the confines of the incident site, and recertifying the aircraft.

Airlines typically have insurance to cover hull loss. Their policies—like many covering assets that are subject to depreciation—typically pay the insured a formulaic used-item value. A damaged aircraft will often simply be scrapped.

Recent discussions within the aviation industry have raised the importance of factoring in new variables, such as environmental impact and regulatory restrictions, when evaluating constructive hull losses. Additionally, advancements in aircraft salvage technologies have reduced the number of cases classified as total losses by enabling more cost-effective recovery and repair efforts.

== History ==
Number of fatalities from airliners' hull loss accidents per year (1940–2023)

In the initial years of aviation (1900s–1920s), hull losses were common due to limited understanding of aerodynamics and aircraft technology. Pioneering aviators like the Wright brothers faced numerous accidents and losses.

World War I and World War II extensively used military aircraft, leading to numerous hull losses in combat. The post-war period witnessed the rapid development of commercial aviation.

The emergence of jet aircraft in the 1950s led to faster, more reliable, and safer aircraft. However, the early years of the jet age also saw some high-profile accidents and hull losses, prompting improvements in training and safety regulations.

== See also ==
- List of accidents and incidents involving commercial aircraft
- Constructive total loss – Insurance covering the loss of ships and other transport
