= Alliance Air Flight 7412 =

2000 aviation accident in India

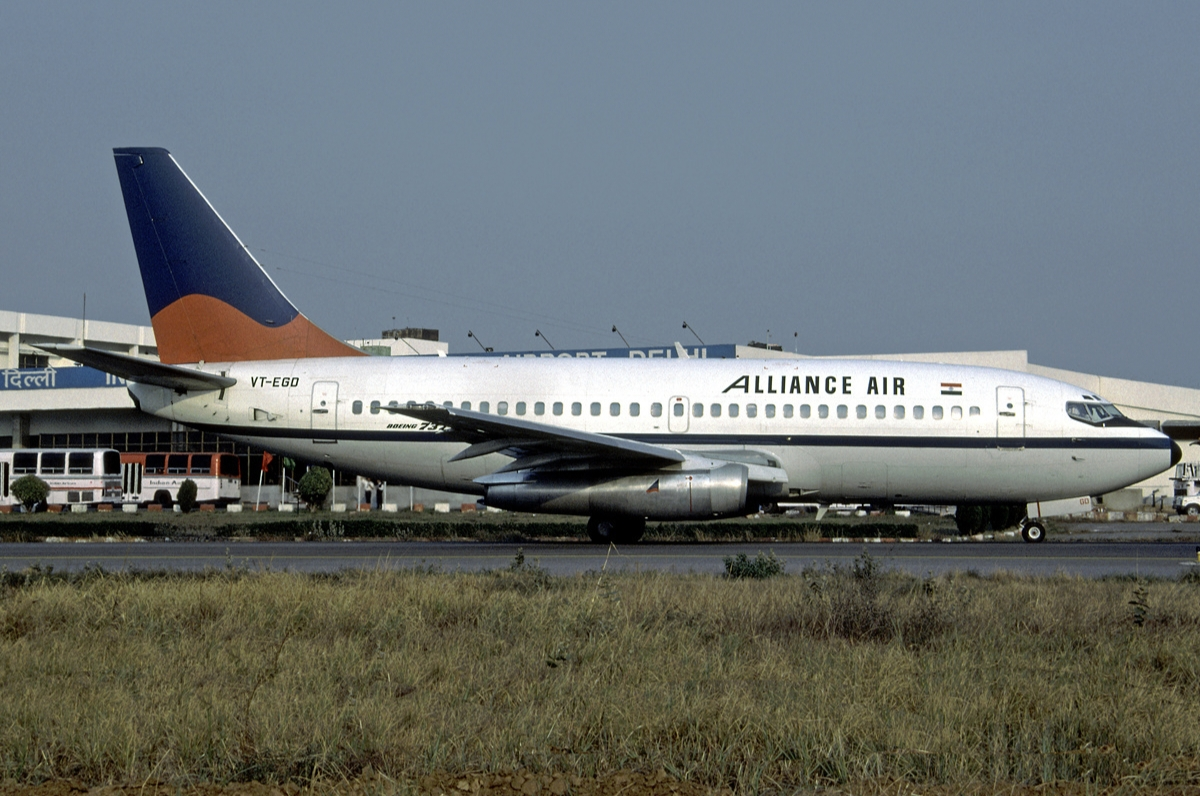
- VT-EGD, the aircraft involved in the accident, seen in March 2000

Accident
- Date: 17 July 2000
- Summary: Stall on approach due to pilot error
- Site: Near Lok Nayak Jayaprakash Airport, Patna, Bihar, India; 25°35′24″N 85°06′18″E
- Total fatalities: 60
- Total injuries: 8

Aircraft
- Aircraft type: Boeing 737-2A8
- Operator: Alliance Air
- IATA flight No.: CD7412
- ICAO flight No.: LLR7412
- Call sign: ALLIED 7412
- Registration: VT-EGD
- Flight origin: Netaji Subhas Chandra Bose International Airport, Calcutta, West Bengal, India
- 1st stopover: Lok Nayak Jayaprakash Airport, Patna, Bihar, India
- Last stopover: Amausi Airport, Lucknow, Uttar Pradesh, India
- Destination: Indira Gandhi International Airport, Delhi, India
- Occupants: 58
- Passengers: 52
- Crew: 6
- Fatalities: 55
- Injuries: 3
- Survivors: 3

Ground casualties
- Ground fatalities: 5
- Ground injuries: 5

Alliance Air Flight 7412 was a scheduled Indian domestic passenger flight from Calcutta to Delhi, operated by Indian regional airline Alliance Air. On 17 July 2000, while on approach to its first stopover in Patna, the Boeing 737-200 operating the route nose-dived and crashed into a residential area in Patna, killing 60 people including 5 on the ground.

The final report, investigated by the Indian Directorate General of Civil Aviation, concluded that the cause of the crash was due to pilot error. The aircraft was on approach with its engines at idle thrust and the crew made several maneuvers with high-pitch attitude. When the aircraft sounded a warning on an impending stall, the crew elected to execute a go-around procedure instead of a stall recovery procedure, causing the aircraft to enter an actual stall condition.

== Aircraft ==
The aircraft involved was a Boeing 737-200, registered in India as VT-EGD. The aircraft was manufactured in 1980 and first delivered to Indian Airlines. It was subsequently leased to Alliance Air in 1999. The aircraft had accrued a total flying cycles of 51,278 cycles. Two Pratt & Whitney JT8D/17A engines powered the aircraft, each developing approximately 16,000 lbf (71 kN) of thrust at sea level. The left engine and the right engine had gone through a total of 13,931 hours and 9,387 hours, respectively. The aircraft was to be phased out by the end of the year per Indian government guidelines which do not allow aircraft over 20 years old to operate in Indian airspace.

The aircraft had been involved in an earlier accident. On 15 January 1986, the pilot of the aircraft attempted to land at Tiruchirapalli in conditions below weather minima. During go-around, the wing contacted the runway due to an excessive bank angle. The wing was substantially damaged, but there were no injuries among the 6 crew and 122 passengers. The pilot displayed great skill in manually flying the aircraft at FL100 (approximately 10,000 feet (3,000 m)) and diverted to Chennai and landed safely with flight controls in "manual reversion" on runway 07.

== Passengers and crew ==
Flight 7412 was carrying 52 passengers and 6 crew members, including 2 flight crew and 4 cabin crew. Most of the passengers were Indian nationals. The passengers comprised 44 men, 5 women and 3 children. Among the passengers were 4 members of a single family from Glasgow. A total of 6 people had boarded the flight to Lucknow, while the other 46 were heading to Patna.

The pilot flying was 31-year-old Captain Arvind Singh Bagga. He had a total flying experience of 4,085 hours, of which 3,605 hours were on the Boeing 737. The pilot not-flying was 35-year-old Captain Manjit Singh Sohanpal. He had a total flying experience of 4,361 hours, of which 1,778 hours were on the Boeing 737. Both flight crew were described as experienced pilots.

== Accident ==
Flight 7412 departed Calcutta (now Kolkata) at 06:51 local time on 17 July 2000 for a flight to the Indian capital of Delhi, with stops at Patna and Lucknow, carrying 52 passengers and 6 crew members. The aircraft was flown by Captain Bagga with Captain Sohanpal as his co-pilot. The flight was uneventful until its approach.

At 07:12 a.m, the aircraft was handed over to Patna following its take-off from Calcutta. At 07:17 a.m, during the approach, Patna ATC asked the crew to report for descent and also to check descent traffic with Calcutta Area Control. The aircraft was then cleared for descent to flight level 75 (approximately 7,500 feet (2,300 m)) and eventually to 4,000 feet (1,200 m). Flight crews were asked to report for an approach to runway 25.

The flight crew reported commencing the turn to Patna at 07:28 a.m and three minutes later they reported crossing the airport area and coming up on the localiser. The aircraft was then asked to descend to 1,700 feet (520 m). Patna ATC later cleared the aircraft to land at Runway 25. The flight crew, however, noticed that their altitude was much higher than the usual altitude for an approach and requested the ATC for a 360-degree orbit. The ATC granted their request and asked the crew to report back on the approach, which the crew acknowledged. This was the last transmission from the crew.

Following the aircraft's clearance for a circle, the flight crew attempted a turn to the left. At the time, the aircraft was flying above Patna's Secretariat Tower. During the left turn, the stick shaker activated, warning the crew on the impending stall condition. The aircraft continued to bank, losing its altitude and eventually grazed trees and a single-storied house in a government residential housing estate, crashing in a government residential colony behind Gardani Bagh Girls School at 07:34 a.m.

Plumes of smoke immediately appeared from the last area where the aircraft was last seen. Patna ATC immediately activated the crash alarm and reported the crash of Flight 7412 to fire services. Authorities arrived at the crash site approximately 15 to 20 minutes after the accident. The accident sparked fire in the area due to the aircraft's 2,5 tonnes of fuel. The search and rescue operation was hampered by the narrow roads and large volumes of people. Airport officials and police were met with anger from locals due to the chaotic situation. Dozens of onlookers even tried to climb rescue vehicles to get a better view on the crash site. The situation finally came under some control after multiple jawans and military officers were deployed to the area.

Two houses were destroyed while another house had damages on the roof. A total of seven people were found alive from the site, four of whom later succumbed due to their injuries. One passenger, a male teenager, managed to survive unscathed from the crash and was able to walk away from the wreckage. Those who survived the crash were seated at the aft fuselage. A total of 60 people, including 5 people on the ground, were killed in the crash.

== Investigation ==
A board of inquiry was appointed by India's Ministry of Civil Aviation on 8 August, with Air Marshal Philip Rajkumar from Bangalore's Aeronautical Development Agency as the head of the board. As the state of the aircraft's manufacturer, the United States sent representatives to India to assist the investigation of the crash. Those included representatives from Boeing, NTSB and the FAA. Public hearings were held and a total of 41 testimonies from witnesses of the crash were examined.

=== Airworthiness issue ===
In the immediate aftermath of the crash, many initially blamed the crash on the old age of the aircraft. The aircraft was manufactured in 1980 and thus many believed that the flying ability of the 20-year-old aircraft had been depleted. There were a number of aspersions cast on the maintenance of flights by Alliance Air, with the then civil aviation minister Sharad Yadav reportedly unhappy with the maintenance of the aircraft and asking for replacement of a number of additional aircraft. The aircraft itself had been involved in an accident in January 1986 in which one of its wings had accidentally grazed the ground, causing substantial damage. The technical logs, however, revealed that the damage was repaired in immediate effect with a "satisfactory result".

Just two weeks before the crash, the British Foreign Office had warned Britons not to board Alliance Air following the withdrawal of a service contract by Rolls-Royce. According to reports, "safety grounds" were cited as the reason of the withdrawal.

While ageing is one of the main concerns in the aviation industry, an aircraft is still deemed as airworthy as long as the operators follow the required modifications and conduct adequate maintenance on the aircraft parts. In the case of Flight 7412, the aircraft had undergone a C check, the highest category of major maintenance check for a Boeing 737-200, between November 1999 and January 2000. The aircraft had been involved in a program for ageing aircraft, called as Corrosion Prevention and Control Program (CPCP), aimed to control and prevent corrosion on the airframe. It had also followed the required modifications for ageing aircraft.

Another airworthiness issue on the crash was the type of the aircraft. Prior to the crash of Flight 7412, the type of the aircraft, the Boeing 737, was a subject of an issue that rocked Boeing in the 90s. The issue stemmed from a malfunction on the aircraft's rudder which caused the crash of two passenger aircraft, United Airlines Flight 585 and USAir Flight 427, claiming the lives of 157 people. Both flights immediately nose-dived while on approach to their destination airports. Following the accidents, the FAA cautioned aircraft operators on the issue and ordered mandatory modifications on every Boeing 737 aircraft in service.

Despite suspicions on the aircraft's airworthiness and its old age, the board of inquiry concluded that the aircraft was airworthy. There was no evidence that the aircraft's rudder had caused the crash and no defects were found in any other aircraft parts, including the engines, flaps and slats.

=== Flight recorders analysis ===
The flight recorders indicated that Captain Bagga was on the left seat and Captain Sohanpal was on the right seat. Captain Bagga was the one in control while Captain Sohanpal was the one in charge with the radio communication. According to the recordings, the sequence of events were as follow:

Flight 7412 had followed the established approach procedure up until 07:28 a.m when Patna ATC asked the flight crew to start turning to the direction of the airport. The flight crew acknowledged the message. However, the aircraft didn't turn. They should have started their descent to 2,000 feet (610 m) while commencing the turn but the aircraft remained at the same altitude and heading, even though two minutes had passed since the message was sent from the ATC. The controller in Patna was given the impression that the flight crew was following the standard approach procedure to Patna, while in reality there was no intention to commence the turn. Captain Sohanpal should have briefed Captain Bagga about the matter, however the recording didn't capture any response from Captain Sohanpal.

01:56:15	Patna ATC	7412 Roger descend to 4000 feet QNH 996 hPa, transition level flight level 55 Report 13 DME for ILS — DME ARC approach Runway 25.
01:56:23	Captain Sohanpal	4000, 996 hPa, call you commencing the ARC.
01:56:54	Patna ATC	Allied 7412 latest QNH 997 H Pa
01:56:58	Captain Sohanpal	997 copied
01:56:58	Patna ATC	QNH correct

The aircraft then started to bank multiple times. It first banked to the left, and then to the right, and to the left again. All of this took 3 and a half minutes with different flaps configurations; 1 degree, 5 degree and 15 degree, respectively. The crew tried to make a zig zag motion in order to lengthen their approach path, thus gradually decreasing their altitude. The aircraft had just crossed the lead radial at an altitude of 3,000 feet (910 m) and was just 3.5 nautical miles (4.0 mi; 6.5 km) from the distance measuring equipment (DME). The correct procedure stated that an aircraft should have been at an altitude of 2,000 feet (610 m) and was 11 nautical miles (13 mi; 20 km) from the DME while it was crossing the lead radial. If they were higher than said altitude and was at a closer distance than the normal flight profile then they would be at an altitude that was too high for an approach to the airport.

The aircraft crossed the extended runway centre line and entered a zig-zag motion again, first to the left and then to the right. The flaps changed from 15 degree to 40 degree. During the entire sequence, from the start of the zig-zag until 15 seconds before the crash, the engines remained at idle position. The reason why the engines were set at idle was not clear, though investigators suspected that it was due to their high altitude for an approach.

At 07:32 a.m, the aircraft reached Patna. It was at 1.2 nautical miles (1.4 mi; 2.2 km) from the DME. As per the approach chart, the aircraft should have been at an altitude of 610 to 650 feet (190 to 200 m) while it was at a distance of 1.2 nautical miles (1.4 mi; 2.2 km). The aircraft, however, was at an altitude of 1,280 feet (390 m). By this point, the crew should have discussed on the next course of action. Captain Sohanpal, however, didn't discuss his next action to Captain Bagga and instead immediately decided to request a 360 degree orbit to Patna ATC, which was granted. This was not in accordance with the Standard Operating Manual (SOP) of Alliance Air and would have probably caused confusion with Captain Bagga due to the unusual decision from Captain Sohanpal. Alliance Air approach manual stated that the crew should have initiated a missed approach procedure. The airspeed, at the time, was still at 130 knots.

02:02:26	Captain Sohanpal	Patna Allied 7412
02:02:28	Patna ATC	Flight 7412 Patna
02:02:30	Captain Sohanpal	I would like to do one 360 due to high on approach, Sir
02:02:34	Patna ATC	Confirm aerodrome in sight.
02:02:36	Captain Sohanpal	Affirm, Sir. Affirm field in sight.
	Patna ATC	Roger, report final Runway 25 after carrying out 360.

Following the aircraft's clearance to orbit, the flight crew initiated a steep left turn and then a right turn. The flight crew made a zig zag motion again, with 21 degree to the left, 14 degree to the right, 47 degree to the left and 30 degree to the right. The pitch was changed from nose down to 8 degree nose up, before it eventually reached 16 degree nose up. The airspeed then dropped from 130 to 122 knots (241 to 226 km/h; 150 to 140 mph). It eventually dropped to 119 knots (220 km/h; 137 mph). Both pilots didn't realize that the speed had dropped. Captain Bagga was looking out the runway while Captain Sohanpal was busy with conversation. The low speed of the aircraft caused the activation of the stick shaker, warning the crew on the impending stall condition.

Within 2 seconds, the engine thrust was increased and the aircraft started to climb. The landing gear was retracted. The crew then decided to switch the flap angle from 40 degree to 15 degree. This was the correct procedure for a go-around, not a stall recovery. When confronted by a stall, the crew should have applied full engine thrust and reduced the aircraft's nose pitch. They also shouldn't have changed the aircraft's flap configuration. The switching of the flap to 15 degree caused a substantial loss of lift due to the reduction of downwards airflow. Six seconds later, the aircraft attained a high rate of descent. The wings no longer generated enough lift. The nose angle remained in up position. The aircraft had completely stalled by this time and even though thrust had been increased to the maximum possible on both engines, recovery was not possible.

02:02:49	Aircraft	Stall warning, stick shaker sound (continues till the end of the tape).
02:02:53	Captain Bagga	Raise the gear up!
02:02:54	Aircraft	Gear unsafe warning
02:02:57	Aircraft	GPWS warning
02:02:59	Captain Sohanpal	NOOOOO! - loud noise.
		End of recording

=== Other findings ===
An observation was made on the surroundings of the airport. Investigators revealed that the presence of tall trees from a nearby zoological garden posed risks to all pilots who intended to land at Runway 25. The radio beam for the glide path was terminated at 300ft due to the trees. Pilots usually stay above the normal glide path until just before the threshold, resulting in late touch down. The tall trees were located inside a nature reserve and hence the Government of Bihar declared that the trees "could not be touched", even though they posed risks to aircraft. There were no efforts from the local government to trim the trees. While the trees didn't pose threat to normal flights in daytime, investigators stated that the presence of tall trees within the approach path would leave no margin of error for pilots who intended to land in Patna at night, during bad weather, on a wet runway or with an aircraft system malfunction.

Adjacent to the runway threshold of Runway 25 was an airport road. The presence of road near the runway caused the threshold to be displaced by 400 ft.

=== Conclusion ===
The final report of the crash was published in April 2001, 9 months after the accident. India's Board of Inquiry cited the following as the cause of the crash:

The cause of the accident was loss of control of the aircraft due human error (air crew). The crew had not followed the correct approach procedure, which resulted in the aircraft being high on approach. They had kept the engines at idle thrust and allowed the air speed to reduce to a lower than normally permissible value on approach. They then maneuvered the aircraft with high pitch attitude and executed rapid roll reversals. This resulted in actuation of the stick shaker stall warning indicating an approaching stall. At this stage, the crew initiated a Go Around procedure instead of Approach to Stall Recovery procedure resulting in an actual stall of the aircraft, loss of control and subsequent impact with the ground.

— Board of Inquiry

The Board of Inquiry issued recommendations for Alliance Air to emphasize on the pilot training, including crew discipline, crew resource management, adherence to standard operating procedure and inclusion of recovery procedure from "approach to stall" and "clean stall". The board also asked multiple governmental bodies (India's Ministry of Civil Aviation, Government of India, Government of Bihar and Airports Authority of India) to get rid of the trees which posed risks to an approaching aircraft.

== Controversy ==
A lawsuit was immediately submitted by one of the survivors of the crash, Prachi Rajgarhia, to both Captain Sohanpal and Captain Bagga, accusing them of violating five different counts of Indian criminal and aviation laws. Charges included were "culpable homicide not amounting to murder" and "rash driving or riding in a public place. The complaint, however, was immediately withdrawn.

Even after the official final report was published, most residents who lived near the crash site, along with the relatives of those who perished in the crash, believed that ATC error was the cause of the accident, claiming that the decision to put the blame on the pilots was "a very easy choice" and even implied that the decision was a cover-up attempt.

== See also ==
- Trigana Air Flight 267, crashed onto mountainous terrain after pilots decided to violate approach procedure
- Air France Flight 447, crew lacked understanding of approach to stall
