= Quick access recorder =

Airborne flight recorder

A quick access recorder (QAR) is a secondary airborne flight recorder designed to provide quick and easy access to raw flight data via USB or cellular network connections and/or standard flash memory cards. QARs are typically used by airlines to improve flight safety and operational efficiency, usually in the scope of their flight operational quality assurance plans. Like the aircraft's flight data recorder (FDR), a QAR receives its inputs from the Flight Data Acquisition Unit (FDAU), recording over 2000 flight parameters. The QAR is also able to sample data at much higher rates than the FDR and, in some cases, for longer periods of time. Unlike the FDR, the QAR is usually not required by a national authority, like the UK's Civil Aviation Authority, on commercial flights, nor is it designed to survive an accident. However, some QARs have survived accidents and provided valuable information beyond what was recorded by the FDR.

The quick access recorder was pioneered by British European Airways (BEA) on its Hawker Siddeley Trident aircraft in the 1960s as a requirement to prove the safety of the aircraft's autoland system for certification of the autoland system by the Civil Aviation Authority (CAA). Quick access recorders are installed in all aircraft operated by BEA's successor airline, British Airways (BA). Data from the Penny & Giles quick access recorder of a BA Boeing 747-400 London-Bangkok flight in which the aircraft suffered un-commanded elevator movement and momentary elevator reversal caused Boeing to implement a change in the elevator servo valve design, a modification that was applied to all Boeing 747s in service, and suspicion of a similar original valve design arising from this BA data was subsequently used by the National Transportation Safety Board (NTSB) in the determining of the causes of the crashes of United Airlines Flight 585 and USAir Flight 427.

Earlier, data from a Trident's quick access recorder had provided the Air Accidents Investigation Branch (AAIB) with useful supplemental data over-and-above that of the aircraft's flight data recorder that helped the diagnosing of the cause of the 1972 British European Airways Flight 548, the "Staines air disaster" where the Trident's leading edge droop flaps had been retracted too early and at too low an airspeed.
