= East wind (disambiguation) =

An east wind is a wind that originates in the east and blows west.

East wind or Eastwind may also refer to:

== Music ==
- Eastwind (music festival)
- EastWind, a 1992 album of Bulgarian and Macedonian folk music by Andy Irvine and Davy Spillane
- East Wind (musical), by Sigmund Romberg, Oscar Hammerstein II and Frank Mandel, premiered on Broadway in 1931
- East Wind Records, a Japanese jazz record label that was established in 1974

== Transportation ==
- Eastwind Airlines
- USCGC Eastwind (WAGB-279), an icebreaker
- USS Eastwind (IX-234), a racing yacht
- East Wind (train), a mid-20th century summer passenger train of the northeastern United States

== Other uses ==
- East Wind Community, an intentional community in Missouri, US

== See also ==
- Dongfeng Motor (Dongfeng means: "East wind")
- Asia Plus (Literal translation from the Chinese name is: "East Wind Satellite TV")
- East Wind: West Wind, a 1930 novel by Pearl S. Buck
- Dongfeng (disambiguation)
