= Aeroflot Flight 1802 =

1976 aviation accident

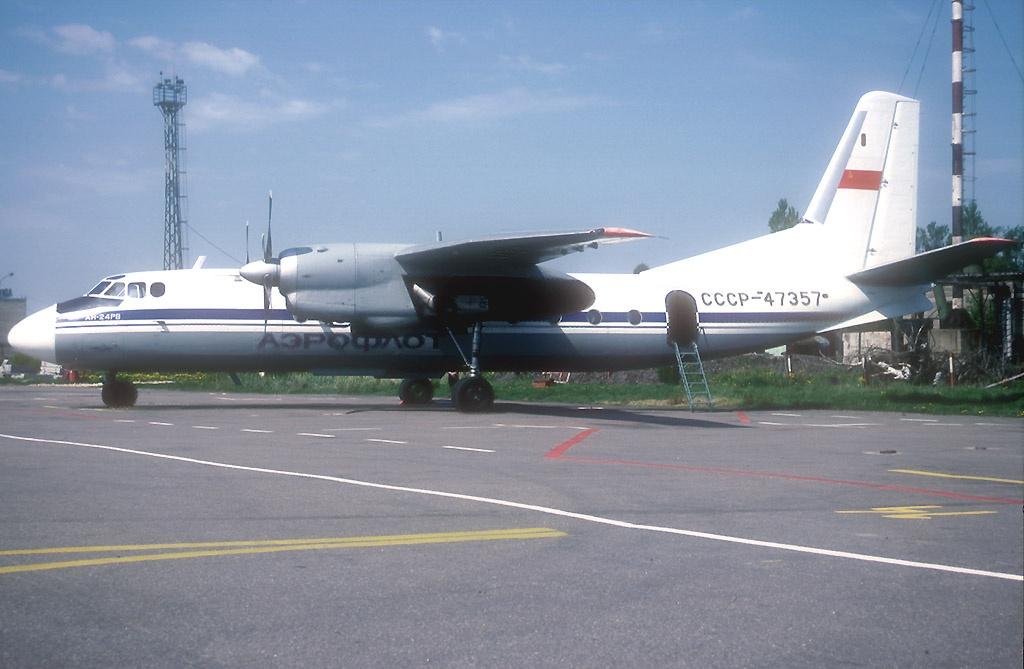
- An Aeroflot Antonov An-24, similar to the one involved in the accident

Accident
- Date: 15 May 1976
- Summary: Loss of control due to unexplained rudder hardover
- Site: near Viktorovka, Chernigov Region, Ukrainian SSR; 51°17′N 31°25′E

Aircraft
- Aircraft type: Antonov An-24
- Operator: Aeroflot
- Registration: CCCP-46534
- Flight origin: Havryshivka Vinnytsia International Airport, Vinnytsia
- Destination: Bykovo Airport, Moscow
- Occupants: 52
- Passengers: 46
- Crew: 6
- Fatalities: 52
- Survivors: 0

Aeroflot Flight 1802 (Russian: Рейс 1802 Аэрофлота Reys 1802 Aeroflota) was a commercial flight from Vinnytsia to Moscow that crashed after the rudder deflected sharply and the propellers feathered on 15 May 1976. All 52 passengers and crew aboard the aircraft perished in the crash.

== Aircraft ==
The aircraft involved in the accident was an Antonov An-24RV, registered CCCP-46534 to Aeroflot. The aircraft rolled off the final assembly line on February 27, 1975. In the aircraft's service life it accumulated 2,996 flight hours and 2,228 pressurization cycles.

== Crew ==
Six crew members were aboard the flight. The cockpit crew consisted of:

- Captain Fyodor Chumak
- Copilot Viktor Pashchenko
- Navigator Pyotr Maksimenko
- Navigator in training Viktor Kozlov
- Flight Engineer Ivan Ukhan

== Synopsis ==
Thunderclouds were present above the Chernihiv region sky for the duration of the flight. Moderate wind blowing southwest on a bearing of 250° at 6 m/s was present, along with moderate rain showers. Visibility on the ground at the airport was 10 kilometers with a cumulonimbus cloudcover. Flight 1802 was flying at an altitude of 5700 meters with a speed of 350 km/h when at approximately 10:47 the rudder suddenly deviated 25° to the right, changing the roll angle and yaw. The pilots responded quickly to this deflection by adjusting the ailerons in their attempts to reduce the roll. A few seconds later the rudder deflected 9°, and the elevators deviated resulting in 30° to pitch (nose held up). The airliner reached sharp angles of attack, and thus went into a tailspin. At the time of entry into the spin, the propellers were feathered. The airliner crashed 14.5 kilometers southeast of Chernigovskiy airport on a bearing of 245° at 10:48 with a rate of descent at nearly 100 m/s in uncontrolled flight. All 52 people on board the aircraft perished in the crash.

== Causes ==
The aircraft crashed due to loss of control caused by the rudder deflecting when the autopilot was disconnected, but the root cause of the rudder deflection was never determined. It is possible one of the pilots accidentally pushed the rudder trim control switch. Electrical failure could also have caused the mechanical issues.

== See also ==
- United Airlines Flight 585 - another crash caused by a rudder hardover.
- USAir Flight 427 - another crash caused by a rudder hardover.
- Eastwind Airlines Flight 517 - another incident caused by a rudder hardover.
