= TWA Flight 841 =

TWA Flight 841 was a regularly scheduled passenger flight operated by Trans World Airlines.

It may refer to:

- TWA Flight 841 (1974), a flight originating in Israel which crashed into the Ionian Sea after a bomb exploded in the cargo hold
- TWA Flight 841 (1979), a domestic flight which entered a spiral dive but was recovered by the pilots and landed safely
