= Eastwind Airlines =

Airline of the United States

IATA	ICAO	Call sign
W9	SGR	STINGER
- Founded: August 1995; 31 years ago
- Ceased operations: 1999; 27 years ago
- Hubs: Trenton, NJ; Greensboro, NC
- Fleet size: 5
- Destinations: 11
- Headquarters: Trenton, New Jersey; Greensboro, North Carolina
- Website: Eastwind Airlines (defunct)

Eastwind Airlines was a start-up airline formed in mid-1995 and headquartered in Trenton, New Jersey, United States, and later in Greensboro, North Carolina.

== History ==
The airline began in August 1995. Jim McNally, a former Price Waterhouse analyst who had headed that firm's recovery teams when several other airlines sought management and investment help, founded the airline. McNally's paper airline found a benefactor in UM Holdings, a Haddonfield, New Jersey–based investment company, which provided investment capital.

Eastwind chose Trenton as no major airlines served Trenton and the airline believed that it could attract passengers from Philadelphia and New York City. The headquarters moved to Greensboro in 1996 after Continental Airlines ended the Continental Lite operations in Greensboro.

Due to the short runway at Trenton-Mercer Airport, the airline served Philadelphia for a short time, but consolidated its flights back to Trenton, New Jersey, in early 1999 when Delta Air Lines terminated their contract to handle ground services.

Eastwind reduced its network during the summer of 1999. It ended service to Boston, Pittsburgh and St. Petersburg-Clearwater in July, followed by Philadelphia in August. The Philadelphia withdrawal was accompanied by the furlough of 60 pilots, flight attendants and ground workers. The airline’s chief executive and two vice presidents also left the company in July.

In October 1997, Eastwind ordered two Boeing 737-700 aircraft, with deliveries scheduled for April and June 1998. Service issues created tension with its customers, resulting in large numbers of complaints filed with the FAA. In 1999, two passengers in Greensboro who feared being stranded in Greensboro refused to get off an airplane forcing the captain to call authorities.

While the airline's management refused to file for bankruptcy, in October 1999, three creditors filed a petition for involuntary bankruptcy in an effort to force the airline to liquidate. The airline ceased all operations shortly afterwards. The two 737-700s were acquired by Southwest Airlines and Shanghai Airlines, while the last three 737-200s were withdrawn from the fleet and permanently retired.

== Destinations ==
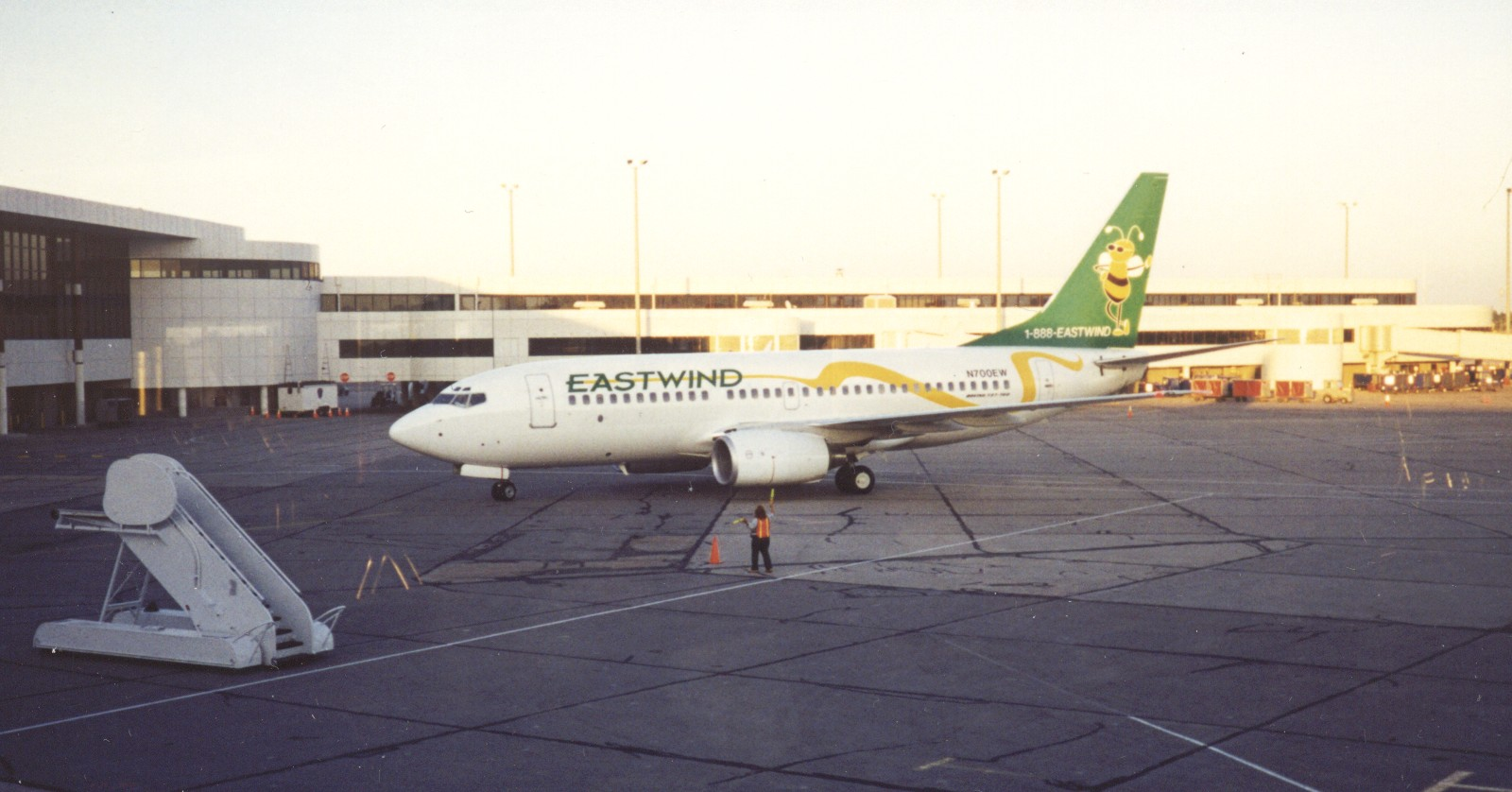
An Eastwind Airlines Boeing 737-700 at Greater Rochester, NY in 1998

The airline served the following destinations in the eastern U.S. at various times during its existence:

Florida

- Fort Lauderdale (Fort Lauderdale-Hollywood International Airport)
- Jacksonville, Florida (Jacksonville International Airport)
- Orlando (Orlando International Airport)
- Saint Petersburg (Saint Petersburg Clearwater International Airport)
- Tampa (Tampa International Airport)
- West Palm Beach (Palm Beach International Airport)

Georgia

- Atlanta (Hartsfield-Jackson Atlanta International Airport)

Massachusetts

- Boston (Logan International Airport)

New Jersey

- Trenton (Trenton-Mercer Airport)

New York

- Rochester (Greater Rochester International Airport)
- New York (LaGuardia Airport)

North Carolina

- Greensboro/High Point/Winston-Salem (Piedmont Triad International Airport)

Pennsylvania

- Philadelphia (Philadelphia International Airport)
- Pittsburgh (Pittsburgh International Airport)

Rhode Island

- Providence (T.F. Green Airport)

Virginia

- Richmond (Richmond International Airport)
- Washington, DC area (Washington Dulles International Airport)

== Fleet ==
At the height of the airline's operation in 1998, it operated a fleet of three Boeing 737-200 and two Boeing 737-700 aircraft. Throughout its history, Eastwind owned a total of five first-generation 737-200, two were already sold for scrap in 1997.

== Incidents ==
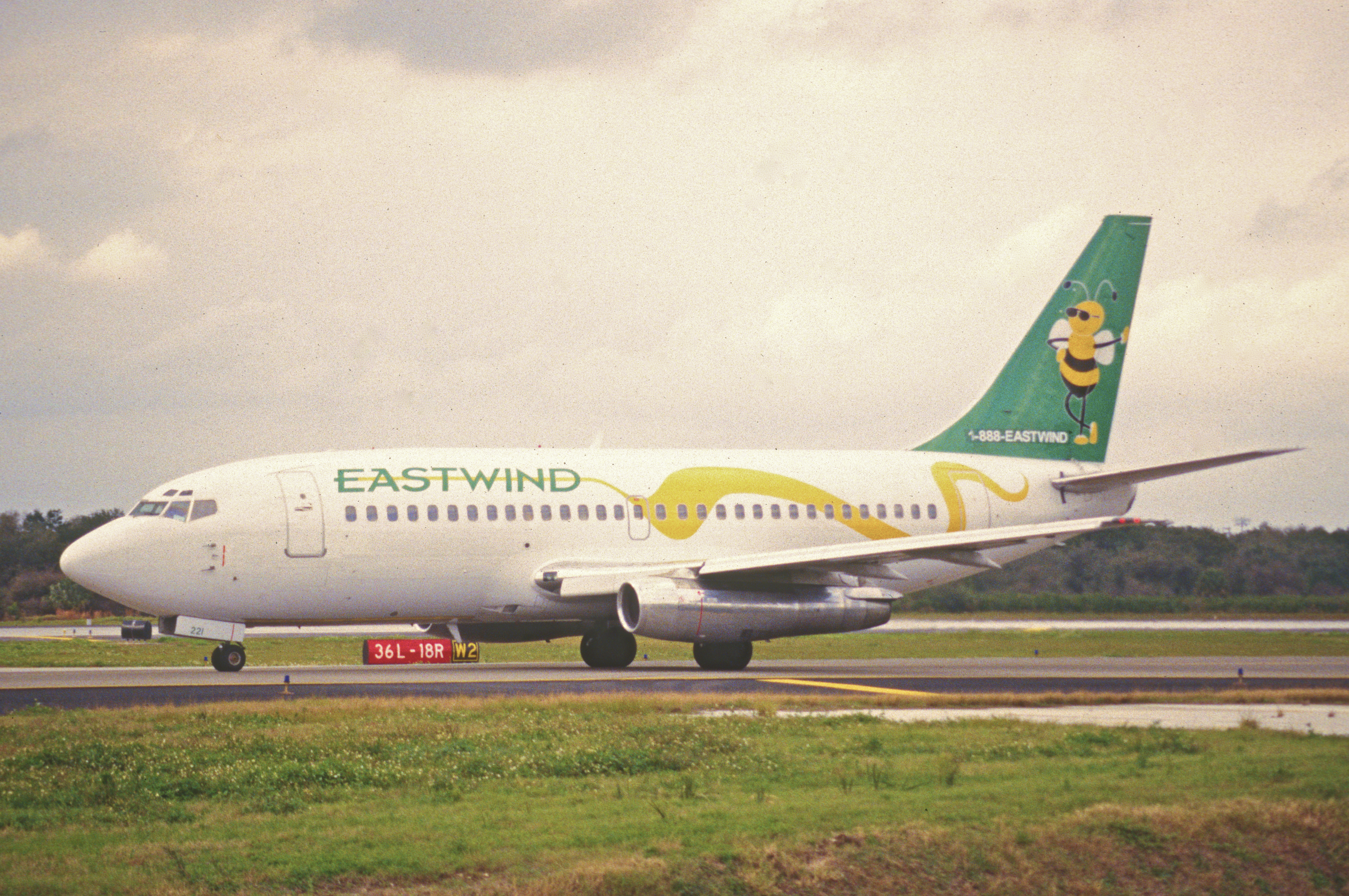
Eastwind Boeing 737-200 (N221US) seen at Tampa International Airport two years after the issues experienced by Flight 517.

On June 9, 1996, Eastwind Airlines Flight 517, a Boeing 737-2H5 experienced a reported loss of rudder control while on approach to Richmond from Trenton. There was one minor injury to a flight attendant and no damage to the airplane as a result of the incident. At the time of the event the airplane's airspeed was about 250 knots and at 4,000 feet MSL. On approach the crew experienced unexpected movement of the rudder causing the airplane rolling to the right. The crew applied opposite rudder to keep the plane from rolling over. Thirty-seconds later the plane righted itself back to normal flight. As the crew performed the emergency checklist the plane again rolled over to the right. Another thirty-seconds went by before the plane snapped back to level. The crew declared an emergency and landed safely in Richmond. Investigation of this incident would later help solve two other unsolved accidents: United Airlines Flight 585 and USAir Flight 427.

On July 17, 1996, the same aircraft was operating as Eastwind Airlines Flight 507 to Trenton-Mercer Airport, when the flight crew witnessed the explosion and crash of TWA Flight 800 directly in front of them. Flight 507's crew were the first to report the accident to air traffic control.

== See also ==
- List of defunct airlines of the United States
