= TWA Flight 841 (1979) =

1979 aviation accident over Michigan

- N840TW, the aircraft involved in the accident, photographed in 1975

Accident
- Date: April 4, 1979
- Summary: Uncontrolled descent; cause disputed
- Site: Over Saginaw, Michigan, United States

Aircraft
- Aircraft type: Boeing 727-31
- Operator: Trans World Airlines
- IATA flight No.: TW841
- ICAO flight No.: TWA841
- Call sign: TWA 841
- Registration: N840TW
- Flight origin: John F. Kennedy International Airport, New York City, United States
- Destination: Minneapolis-Saint Paul International Airport, Minneapolis, United States
- Occupants: 89
- Passengers: 82
- Crew: 7
- Fatalities: 0
- Injuries: 8
- Survivors: 89

TWA Flight 841 was a scheduled passenger flight from John F. Kennedy International Airport, New York City, en route to Minneapolis-Saint Paul International Airport in Minneapolis, Minnesota. On the evening of April 4, 1979, while flying over Saginaw, Michigan, the Boeing 727-31 airliner began a sharp, uncommanded roll to the right, and subsequently went into a spiral dive. The pilots were able to regain control of the aircraft and made an emergency landing at Detroit Metropolitan Airport.

== Background ==
=== Aircraft ===
The aircraft involved, manufactured in 1965, was a 14-year-old Boeing 727-31, registered as N840TW with serial number 18905. In its 14 years of service, it had accumulated about 35,412 hours and it was equipped with three Pratt & Whitney JT8D-7B engines.

=== Crew ===
In command was Captain Harvey G. "Hoot" Gibson, aged 44, who had logged a total of 15,710 piloting hours, 2,597 of them on the 727. The day before he had returned to flying following a three month medical leave. The First Officer was Jess Scott Kennedy, aged 40, who had logged a total of 10,336 total piloting hours, 8,348 of them on the 727. The flight engineer was Second Officer Gary N. Banks, 37, who had logged a total of 4,186 piloting hours, 1,186 of them on the 727.

== Accident ==
At 8:25 p.m. EST, TWA Flight 841 departed JFK International after a 45-minute delay due to traffic congestion and reached its initial cruising altitude of 35,000 feet at 8:54 p.m. Due to a 100-knot headwind, the pilots requested to climb to 39,000 feet at 9:25 p.m., which was granted. At 9:47 p.m., while cruising at 39,000 feet (12,000 m) near the city of Saginaw, Michigan, Captain Gibson said the aircraft was operating with the autopilot on "Altitude Hold" mode when he felt a high frequency vibration in the balls of his feet, followed by a buzzing sound and a light buffeting of the airframe. He looked at his instruments and saw the plane banking right before yawing sharply to the right, briefly pausing, and yawing right again into a skidding right roll with the autopilot moving the control wheel to the left to level the wings. Gibson disconnected the autopilot and applied full left aileron, which had no effect. He got on the rudder pedals and applied full left rudder. As he did so something didn't feel right but he couldn't place it. Although Captain Gibson's inputs briefly stopped the roll from increasing, the roll continued and the aircraft spiraled out of control. Gibson shouted something to the effect of "We're going over!" After completing one 360° roll, Gibson shouted to the co-pilot "Get em' up!" referring him to deploy the speed brakes, but the co-pilot didn't understand what the Captain meant so Gibson deployed them, which also had no effect.

Flight 841 dove about 34,000 feet (10,000 m) in just 63 seconds. During the course of the dive, the plane rolled through 360 degrees at least twice and exceeded the Mach limit for the 727 airframe.

At about 15,000 feet (4,600 m) the pilots extended the landing gear in an attempt to slow the aircraft. A few seconds after extending the gear, Gibson managed to regain control and pulled the 727 out of its dive at about 5,000 feet (1,500 m). The plane suffered substantial structural damage with the No.7 leading-edge slat and a flight spoiler having detached, the right outboard aileron hinge fitting broke due to metal fatigue resulting in free-play, and the System A hydraulics ruptured due to the right main gear overextending that also broke the sidebrace and actuator support beam; the Flight Engineer reported they had a fail flag for the lower rudder yaw damper but made an emergency landing at Detroit Metropolitan Airport in Michigan at 10:31 p.m. EST without further trouble. After landing and shutting the engines down the pilots turned on the Auxiliary Power Unit (APU) as a mechanic plugged into an intercom to talk to the pilots and reported fuel was leaking from the left side. All 89 people deplaned via the aft airstair with only eight passengers suffering minor injuries.

== Investigation ==
The aircraft returned to service in May 1979. The flight crew would be questioned on three occasions during the course of the entire investigation: hours after landing in Detroit, on April 12, 1979, and on January 29, 1980. The investigators of the National Transportation Safety Board (NTSB) located the No. 7 slat missing from the leading edge of the right wing amongst other parts that had detached. They requested that Boeing, the manufacturer, inspect the remainder of the slat assembly, including a portion of the slat actuator cylinder (the motor that moves the slat and holds it in position). Boeing determined that the No. 7 slat had failed because the slats had been extended while the aircraft was flying at cruising speed. They also determined that it was "impossible" for the slat to extend without manipulating the controls.

The TWA Flight 841 investigation would be at the time the lengthiest accident investigation in the NTSB's history. After eliminating all known sources of mechanical failure, the NTSB concluded in June 1981 in its final report, that the probable cause of the accident was the isolated extension of the No. 7 leading-edge slat from the flight crew manipulating the flap/slat controls in an inappropriate manner leading to an uncommanded roll to the right and the captain's untimely action.

The Safety Board determines that the probable cause of this accident was the isolation of the No. 7 leading-edge slat in the fully or partially extended position after an extension of the Nos. 2, 3, 6 and 7 leading-edge slats and the subsequent retraction of the Nos. 2, 3, and 6 slats, and the captain's untimely flight control inputs to counter the roll resulting from the slat asymmetry. Contributing to the cause was a preexisting misalignment of the No. 7 slat that, when combined with the cruise condition airloads, precluded retraction of that slat. After eliminating all probable individual or combined mechanical failures, or malfunctions that could lead to slat extension, the Safety Board determined that the extension of the slats was the result of the flightcrew's manipulation of the flap/slat controls. Contributing to the captain's untimely use of the flight controls was distraction due probably to his efforts to rectify the source of the control problem.

Investigators claimed that 727 pilots (in general, and this crew specifically) were enabling the trailing edge flaps to extend independently of the slats via the flap/slat lever by turning the Alternate flap switch on, pulling the leading-edge slats circuit breaker, turning the Alternate flap switch off and then setting the flaps to two degrees during high altitude cruise. This configuration was rumored to result in increased lift with no increase in drag, thus allowing more speed, higher elevation, or decreased fuel consumption. Flight tests showed that airspeed and performance decreased in this configuration. Flaps and slats are intended to only be deployed at low speeds during take-off and landing.

The crew, Capt. Harvey G. "Hoot" Gibson (1934–2015), First Officer Jess Scott Kennedy (1939-2017) and Second Officer Gary N. Banks (born 1942), denied that their actions had been the cause of the flaps' extension:

At no time prior to the incident did I take any action within the cockpit either intentionally or inadvertently, that would have caused the extension of the leading edge slats or trailing edge flaps. Nor did I observe any other crew member take any action within the cockpit, either intentional or inadvertent, which would have caused the extension.

— Capt. Gibson

The flight crew testified that they had not engaged the flaps and instead suggested that the actuator to the No. 7 slat had failed, causing its inadvertent deployment. The NTSB concluded that "if the flight crew's recollections are accurate," the slat extension must have been caused by a mechanical failure or defect but ultimately rejected this as improbable and attributed the extension of the flaps to the deliberate actions of the crew. The crew maintained that such failures had happened on other 727s prior and subsequent to this incident. The NTSB report noted seven separate cases involving a single leading edge slat extension and separation were reported between 1970 and 1973, but none of these reports indicated whether or not the slat extension was due to flight crew involvement. Records after 1974 did include two reported slat extensions between 1974 and towards the end of the NTSB's investigation in 1981, one of which was inadvertently caused by the flight crew. Nonetheless, in none of these previous cases did the flights experience significant problems.

Gibson and the Air Line Pilots Association (ALPA) appealed against the NTSB's findings, first to the NTSB itself in 1983, 1990, 1991, 1992, and 1995 and then to the U.S. Ninth Circuit Court of Appeals. Both petitions were rejected: the former for lack of new evidence, and the latter for lack of jurisdiction due to the NTSB's "unreviewable discretion".

== Cockpit voice recorder ==
The aircraft was equipped with a Fairchild Industries Model A-100 cockpit voice recorder (CVR). 21 minutes of the 30-minute tape were blank. Tests of the CVR in the aircraft revealed no discrepancies in the CVR's electrical and recording systems. The CVR tape can be erased by means of the bulk-erase feature on the CVR control panel in the cockpit. This feature can be activated only after the aircraft is on the ground with the engines turned off and its parking brake engaged. In a deposition taken by the Safety Board, the captain stated that he usually activated the bulk-erase feature on the CVR at the conclusion of each flight to preclude inappropriate use of recorded conversations. In this instance, however, he and the other two pilots did not recall having done so.

Excerpt of the CVR transcript; full transcript available in Appendix D.
Source	Content
Captain	(Well the) nose gear door
Fire Department	Hello Cockpit
Radio	Yeah.
Fire Department	Ah, did you call operations and request a bus?
Radio	No, but we will.
Fire Department	Okay, thank you.
Unknown	What's the ramp frequency here?
Flight Engineer	Detroit one twenty nine one.
Unknown	I wonder if there's anybody in there?
Unknown	Ah, I hope so.
Radio	Ah ramp TWA, this is eight forty one.
TWA Ramp	Yeah go ahead.
Radio	Ah we've been asked to deplane the passengers, ah, because of a slight fuel leak here. The fire department has asked us to get 'em off and ah we'd like some kind of transportation, a bus for them, please.
Radio	What we're going to do is drop the aft stairs and let them walk off ah without excitement, we just want to get them off easily, but we need to get them out of off the taxiway here.
TWA Ramp	Yeah, are you still, you still on the runway or?
Radio	No, we're on a turnoff from the runway, we're clear of the runway.
TWA Ramp	Okay, we'll see what we can do here, is there any way that you can keep in contact with us here?
Unknown	Want help?
Unknown	Well we won't need that anymore.
Unknown	(Looks like) a hydraulic fluid loss huh.
Unknown	That's what we were told hydraulic
Unknown	Did you feel kind helpless in that seat back there?
Unknown	Well, I'll tell you (Believe me).
Unknown	You know it's funny to be back here trying to analyze -- this situation. If it happened here, hard to see what's happening, you guys were trying to pull it up.
Unknown	Yeah
Unknown	Saying get it up, pull it up. like
Unknown	That's ah --- emergency descent, as a flyer who wasn't flying it.
TWA Ramp	Eight forty one from Detroit ramp.
Radio	TWA's eight forty one, go ahead.
TWA Ramp	Yes sir, looks like your pretty close to Eastern's terminal there, you think its conceivable that we can walk the people over there, I'm gonna have a hard time gettin' a bus.
Radio	Okay, if you could bring somebody over as a guide, I think that would be fine, they wouldn't mind walking that far.
Flight Engineer	Okay, what they intend to do Is they cannot get a bus so they're going to bring a guide out and walk them to the Eastern terminal. Ah, whichever one of these it is but in any case they're going to walk them.
First Officer	Hoot.
Captain	Yeah.
Unknown	for all the help the people did great, they did exactly what they were told to do.
Flight Engineer	That's because you guys took over and did it.
Radio	Ah, ramp TWA's eight forty one. Do you need a, any further contact here, if not I'll turn the radios off?
TWA Ramp	Ah, no except, ah, can you give me anything, any indication on the airplane or anything dispatch, planning and everybody else is calling, ah can, is there any information that you can give me?
Radio	No sir, we can't. I'm sitting in the cockpit and I can't tell you, I don't know what the situation is, you'll have to talk to maintenance.
TWA Ramp	Yeah well I mean ah, you lost hydraulic is that it?
Radio	We assume that's what happened but we can't tell you that what I say until (you) talk to maintenance.
TWA Ramp	Okay, you can sign off then.
Radio	Detroit Ramp do you read?
Radio	Detroit Ramp do you read?
End Of Recording	

The NTSB made the following statement in the accident report while also acknowledging that the upset and the events leading up to it would not have been recorded:

We believe the captain's erasure of the CVR is a factor we cannot ignore and cannot sanction. Although we recognize that habits can cause actions not desired or intended by the actor, we have difficulty accepting the fact that the captain's putative habit of routinely erasing the CVR after each flight was not restrainable after a flight in which disaster was only narrowly averted. Our skepticism persists even though the CVR would not have contained any contemporaneous information about the events that immediately preceded the loss of control because we believe it probable that the 25 minutes or more of recording which preceded the landing at Detroit could have provided clues about causal factors and might have served to refresh the flightcrew's memories about the whole matter.

— National Transportation Safety Board, page 33

== Air Line Pilots Association comments ==
In the Air Line Pilots Association's (ALPA) 1990 petition to the NTSB to reconsider their findings, an analysis conducted by ALPA concluded that the No. 7 slat did not cause the upset and instead extended as a result of the upset. Had the slat caused the upset then it would have detached from the wing at an altitude of around 31,500 feet, not at 8,000 feet. ALPA concluded that evidence best supported that while cruising at 39,000 feet, the bolt to the outboard right aileron on TWA flight 841 fractured, causing the aileron to flutter and create the high frequency vibration that Captain Gibson reported. As the aileron floated up, the plane banked to the right and turned off its heading, the autopilot tried to correct for this by moving the control wheel left. Once the control wheel turned more than 10°, the spoilers on the left wing deployed to aid in roll control, creating the buzzing sound. With the plane turning right and the autopilot commanding a left turn, the 727 was in a cross-controlled position. The yaw damper rate gyro and or coupler sensed discrepant rudder inputs which resulted in the lower rudder going into the hardover position, causing the plane to yaw severely right. In this condition the left wing produced more lift as a result. A large sideslip angle on sweptback planes like the 727 produces a large rolling moment.

Although Gibson disconnected the autopilot and applied opposite aileron and upper rudder, with the lower rudder in the hardover position and limited roll control due to the right outboard aileron free-floating, his control inputs were insufficient to prevent TWA 841 from going into an uncontrollable spiral dive. When the crew lowered the landing gear, the over extension of the right main landing gear ruptured System A hydraulics that centered the lower rudder and allowed the pilots to recover from the dive. Analysis of the No. 7 slat by the NTSB showed a lack of wear, it was misaligned, and didn't lock into its locking mechanism, meaning that it was held in place only by hydraulic pressure and aerodynamic forces. With the loss of hydraulics, the slat extended at 8,000 feet and quickly ripped off. The other slats stayed retracted because they locked into their locking mechanisms.

== In media ==
This accident was the subject of a CBS News Special titled, "The Plane That Fell From the Sky". The special won a Peabody Award in 1983.

The accident was featured on season 22 of the Canadian documentary series Mayday, in the episode titled "Terror over Michigan".

== See also ==
- China Airlines Flight 006 - Another case where a Boeing aircraft entered an uncontrolled nose-dive
- China Eastern Airlines Flight 583 — Another slat extension in-flight accident
- United Airlines Flight 585
- USAir Flight 427
- Eastwind Flight 517
