= Five Little Indians =

Indian rock band

- Origin: Kolkata, West Bengal, India
- Genres: Alternative rock, hardcore punk, hard rock
- Occupation: Musician
- Years active: 2007–2011
- Label: Independent
- Members: Neel Adhikari; Allan Ao; Arka Das; Sayak Banerjee; Roheet Mukherjee
- Past members: Sandip Roy; Rabi L. Roy; Sanket Bhattacharya
- Website: fivelittleindians.com

Five Little Indians (Bengali: ফাইভ লিটিল ইন্ডিয়নস), (also known as FLI) was an alternative rock band based in Kolkata. The band was formed in January 2007. Five Little Indians merged melodic rock and a heavier sound with singer-songwriter sensibilities. The band used Hindustani classical vocals and often mixed ragas with a rock sound.

== History ==
Five Little Indians played its debut show at the Eastwind Festival '08. The band had formed only a few months before.

Back at Kolkata, the band was featured in The Times of India for its original sound. Simultaneously, FLI was the band in focus for August 2008 on IndianMusicRevolution. The band played the Calcutta leg of the RSJ Pubrockfest '08, taking the stage after Aurora Jane to a full house at Someplace Else. The band played at Star Theatre, Calcutta as part of INTERface '08, an inter-disciplinary arts festival featuring artistes from Korea, Singapore, Switzerland and Japan. In November 2008, FLI's original "Screaming at the Sun" saw a worldwide release as part of Stupidditties 2, a compilation of Indian "un-metal" music from ennui.BOMB, supported by Counter Culture Records.

The November issue of Rolling Stone magazine, India, featured FLI's first single, "Happy Birthday" on its Downloads section, lauding the band's dark, moody sound and offering up a 3½ rating for the song.

In early 2009, FLI co-headlined the east zone finals of Campus Rock Idols with Skinny Alley in January. In May, the band, along with Bertie Da Silva and The Supersonics, organised the first chapter of Elektrik Kool Rock Revue, a platform for all-original music showcased in a series of shows. FLI also opened for French chanson-rockers KWAK and was featured as part Littlei's Friday Night Live series at the Big Ben, The Kenilworth. Apart from the 2008 and 2009 editions of the RSJ/Kingfisher Pubrockfest, the band headlined the Autumn Festival 2009 at Shillong and then headlined the Hornbill Festival in Kisama, Kohima. In February 2010, the FLI opened for pop singer Richard Marx at Rock'N'India, Bangalore, along with Swarathma, Jaycee Lewis and Prime Circle from South Africa. FLI also played the Greenpeace Earth Day Fest in May 2010.

In between live performances, Five Little Indians also crafted the soundtrack to Gandu, the critically acclaimed 2010 feature by Kolkata-based director Q. The independent film went on to bag several awards at the South Asian International Film Festival 2010 at New York. Five Little Indians disbanded in 2011.

== Members ==
- Neel Adhikari: vocals, guitar
- Allan Temjen Ao: guitar, backing vocals
- Arka Das: drums/percussion
- Sayak Banerjee: vocals, guitar
- Roheet Mukherjee: bass guitar, vocals

=== Former members ===
- Sandip Roy: bass, backing vocals
- Rabi L. Roy: bass, backing vocals
- Sanket Bhattacharya: bass guitar, vocals
