= Eastwind (music festival) =

- Genre: All genres of Original & Contemporary music
- Dates: Scheduled: 22 February – 24 February 2008
- Location: New Delhi, India
- Years active: 2008
- Founders: Adhiraj Mustafi, Prospect Advisory & Management
- Website: www.eastwindfestival.com

Eastwind was a music festival held in 2008 which was planned to be held annually in India garnering participation from all the major bands and artists in the country. The criterion was Original Contemporary Music and artists performed over three days and through parallel stages from morning till night.

== The festival ==
The recent years (since 2000) have seen increased recognition, visibility and a surge in popularity of contemporary original music in India. In spite of that, the world’s perception of Indian music is still subjected to stereotypes, typically Bollywood.

New Delhi plays host to a large number of the nation’s most popular live acts. With Indian bands and their music getting popular and bands being invited to perform abroad, Eastwind creates a single-point showcase that recognises and presents this talent as an entertainment experience.

The idea of a large-scale music festival in India was pathbreaking and the participation of the most popular bands in the country was the main crowd-pulling element of the festival. Prospect Advisory & Management, who visualized and created this festival, was swamped with requests for participation that they even had to postpone the first event in order to get through all the demos and applications.

The second edition was postponed from October 2009 to January 2010 before being cancelled.

== Performing artists ==
- Leni Stern
- Karsh Kale
- Skinny Alley
- Dhruv Ghanekar and the Ranjit Barot Project
- PINKNOISE
- Thermal and a Quarter
- Shaa’ir + Func
- Pentagram
- Avial
- Chromozome Eye
- Them Clones
- Jalebee Cartel
- Parikrama
- Helga's Fun Castle
- Groove Suppa
- Indian Ocean
- Bandish
- East India Company
- Hypnosis
- Evergreen
- Baja Gaja
- Oidua
- Boomarang
- III Sovereign
- Mrigya
- Sattyanada
- Raghu Dixit Project
- Junkyard Groove
- Midival Punditz
- Levitikus
- Barefaced Liar
- Blend
- Dream Out Loud
- Cassini’s Division
- Span
- Five Little Indians
- Anal Funk
- Little Babooshka’s Grind
- HFT
- Half Step Down
- Myndsnare
- Menwhopause
- Kryptos
- Soulmate
- Galeej Gurus
- Artistes Unlimited
- Feedback
- Medusa
- Sajid Akbar and the Lost Boys
- Detonation
- Level 9
- Advaita
- Anterior
- Caesar’s Palace
- Scribe
- Motherjane
- Cyanide
- Split
- Something Relevant
- Demonic Resurrection
- Mohit Chauhan
