= Eastwind Airlines Flight 517 =

1996 aviation incident in Virginia

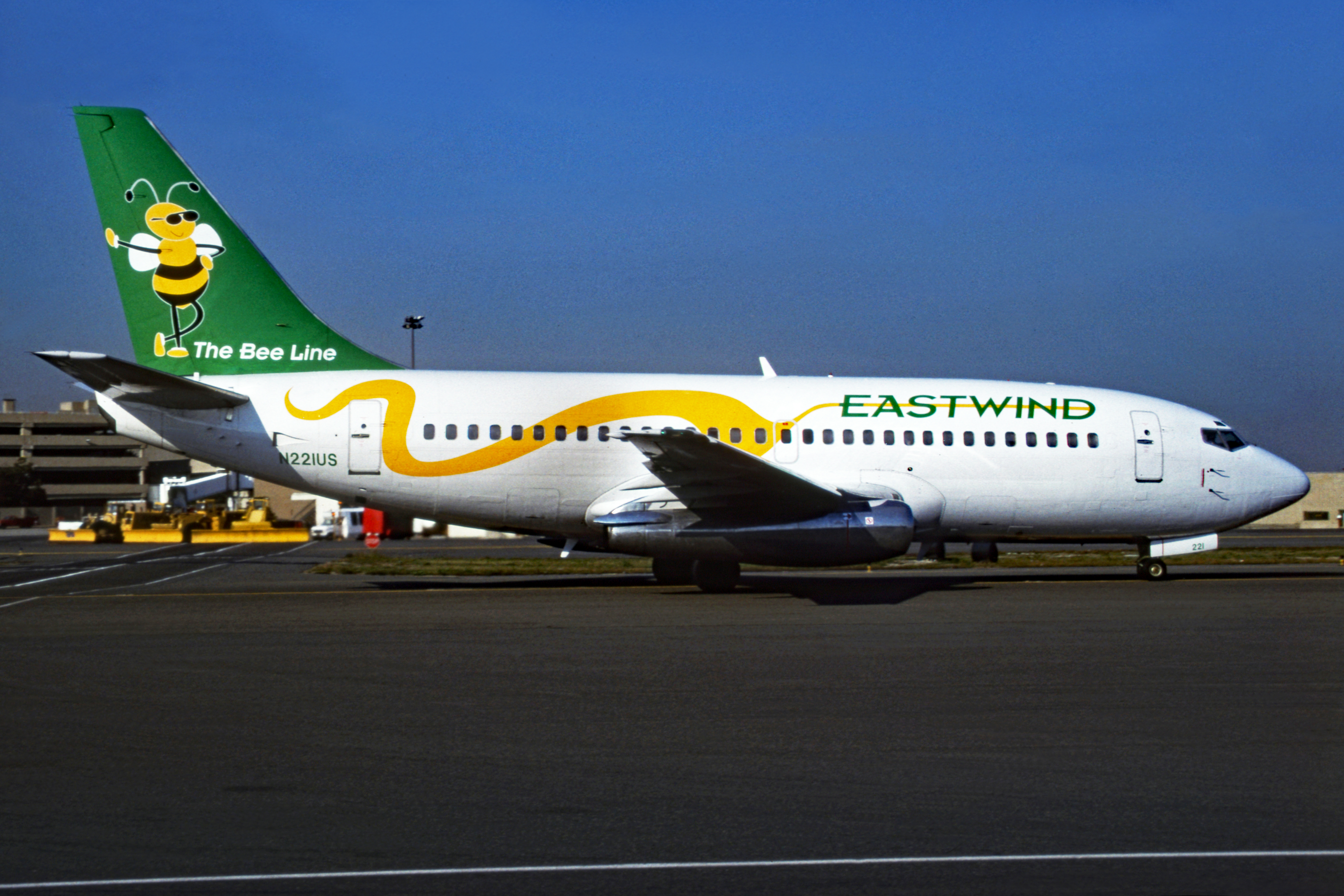
- N221US, the aircraft involved in the incident

Incident
- Date: June 9, 1996
- Summary: Uncommanded rudder hardover
- Site: Richmond International Airport, Richmond, Virginia, United States; 37°30′18″N 077°19′10″W

Aircraft
- Aircraft type: Boeing 737-2H5 (Note: The aircraft was a Boeing 737-200 model; Boeing assigns a unique code for each company that buys one of its aircraft, which is applied as a suffix to the model number at the time the aircraft is built, hence "737-2H5" designates a 737-200 built for Mey-Air (customer code H5).)
- Operator: Eastwind Airlines
- IATA flight No.: W9517
- ICAO flight No.: SGR517
- Call sign: STINGER 517
- Registration: N221US
- Flight origin: Trenton-Mercer Airport
- Destination: Richmond International Airport
- Occupants: 53
- Passengers: 48
- Crew: 5
- Fatalities: 0
- Survivors: 53

On June 9, 1996, while operating a passenger flight from Trenton, New Jersey, to Richmond, Virginia, the crew of Eastwind Airlines Flight 517 temporarily lost control of their Boeing 737-200 because of a rudder malfunction. The crew were able to regain control and land the aircraft successfully. All 53 occupants on board the 737-200 survived with no injuries.

Flight 517 was instrumental in resolving the cause of Boeing 737 rudder issues that had caused two previous fatal crashes because it was the first flight to experience such rudder issues and land safely, allowing investigators to interview the pilots about their experience and to study the aircraft.

== Aircraft ==
The aircraft involved was a Boeing 737-2H5, MSN 20454, registered as N221US, that first flew on September 23, 1970. It was originally delivered to Mey-Air on October 27, 1971, registered as LN-MTD. After the airline's bankruptcy on February 22, 1974, Boeing acquired and sold the aircraft to Piedmont Airlines on May 15, 1974, re-registering the aircraft to N754N. After USAir acquired the airline in 1989, it re-registered the aircraft to N221US. It was then sold to Eastwind Airlines on July 12, 1995. The aircraft was powered by two Pratt & Whitney JT8D-9A engines.

== Background ==
On March 3, 1991, United Airlines Flight 585, a Boeing 737-200, rolled to the right and went into a vertical dive while attempting to land in Colorado Springs, Colorado. The resulting crash killed all 25 people on board. The National Transportation Safety Board (NTSB) conducted a thorough investigation. Although a rudder problem was suspected, the aircraft's rudder components could not be tested or fully evaluated because they were severely damaged in the crash. As a result, the NTSB was unable to conclusively identify the cause of the crash.

On September 8, 1994, USAir Flight 427, a Boeing 737-300, abruptly rolled to the left while on approach to Pittsburgh International Airport in an accident very similar to that of Flight 585. The resulting crash killed all 132 people on board. The NTSB's subsequent investigation persisted throughout the late 1990s.

== Flight information ==
Flight 517 was a scheduled Eastwind Airlines passenger flight from Trenton-Mercer Airport in Trenton, New Jersey, to Richmond International Airport in Richmond, Virginia. The flight was operated using a Boeing 737-200 (registration number N221US). On June 9, 1996, Flight 517 was operated by Captain Brian Bishop and First Officer Spencer Griffin. A total of 53 people were on board.

== Incident ==
Flight 517 departed Trenton without incident and encountered no turbulence or unusual weather en route to Richmond. While on approach to Richmond International Airport, at an altitude of about 5,000 feet (1,500 m) MSL, the captain felt a brief "kick" or "bump" on the right rudder pedal. Around the same time, a flight attendant at the rear of the plane heard a thumping noise underneath her. As the plane continued to descend through 4,000 feet (1,200 m), the captain suddenly experienced a loss of rudder control and the plane rolled sharply to the right.

Attempting to regain control, the captain tried to apply full left rudder, but the rudder controls were stiff and did not respond to his commands. He applied left aileron and increased power to the right engine to try to stop the roll. The airplane temporarily stabilized, but then it rolled to the right again. The crew performed their emergency checklist and attempted to regain control of the aircraft, and after several seconds they abruptly regained control. The airplane operated normally for the remaining duration of the flight.

No damage occurred to the aircraft as a result of the incident. No passengers or crew aboard Flight 517 were injured.

== Investigation and aftermath ==
The NTSB investigated the incident, with a particular focus on determining whether the events of Flight 517 were related to previous Boeing 737 crashes.

During the investigation, the NTSB found that prior to the June 9 incident, flight crews had reported a series of rudder-related events on the incident aircraft, including abnormal "bumps" on the rudder pedals and uncommanded movement of the rudder.

Investigators conducted interviews with the pilots of Flight 517, and removed rudder components from the aircraft for examination, which helped to establish the cause of the previous crashes of United Airlines Flight 585 and USAir Flight 427. The NTSB determined that all three incidents could be explained only by pilot error or a malfunction of the rudder system, and, based partly on post-accident interviews with the Flight 517 pilots, concluded that rudder malfunctions were likely to have caused all three incidents.

The NTSB also determined that, unlike the United or USAir accidents, the rudder problem on Flight 517 occurred earlier in the landing process and at a higher speed, which increased airflow over the other control surfaces of the aircraft, allowing the pilots to overcome the rudder-induced roll.

N221US returned to service with Eastwind Airlines and continued to operate for them until the airline ceased operations in 1999. On July 17, 1996, N221US was operating as Eastwind Airlines Flight 507 to Trenton-Mercer Airport, when the flight crew witnessed the explosion and crash of TWA Flight 800 directly in front of them. Flight 507's crew were the first to report the accident to air traffic control. The aircraft was placed into storage at Greenwood–Leflore Airport in 1999, and was scrapped in 2000.

== In popular culture ==
The Discovery Channel Canada / National Geographic TV series Mayday dramatized the incident of Flight 517 and the subsequent 737 rudder investigation in a 2007 episode titled "Hidden Danger".

== See also ==
- Northwest Airlines Flight 85
