= USAir Flight 427 =

1994 aviation accident in Pennsylvania

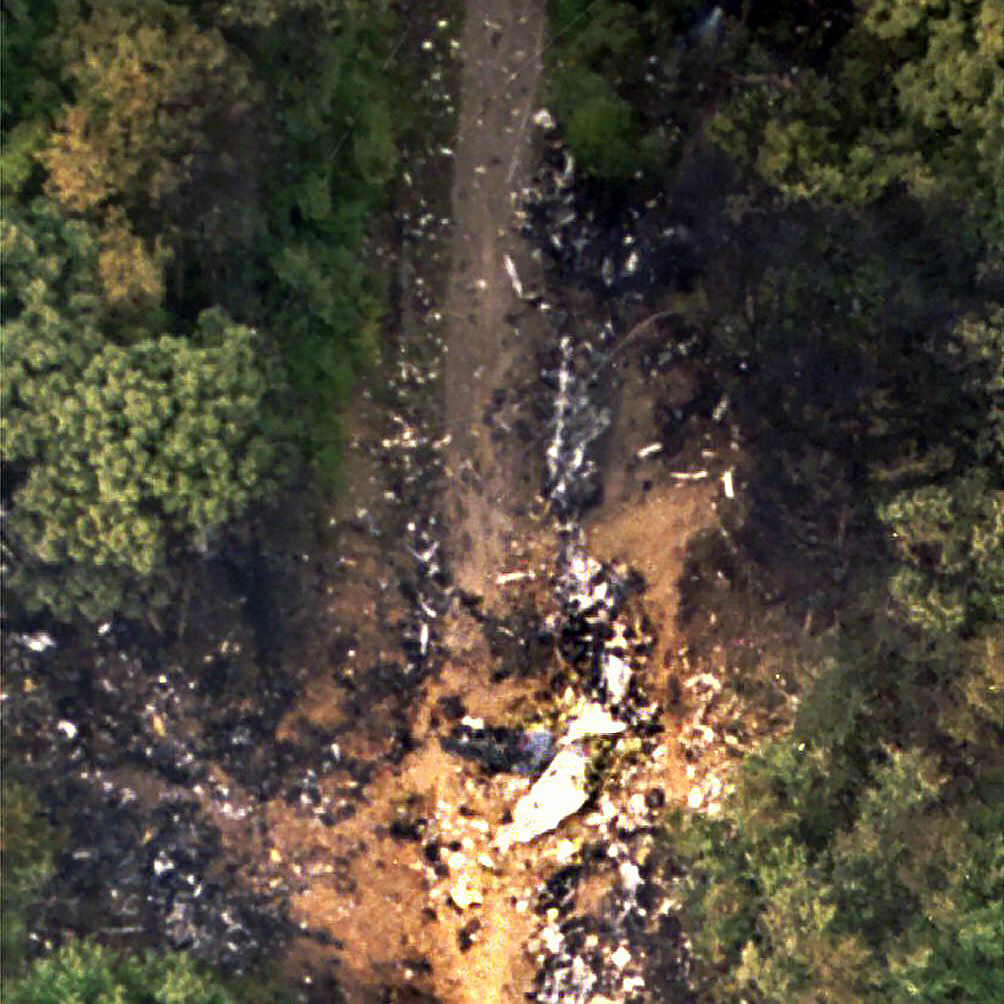
- Aerial view of the crash site

Accident
- Date: September 8, 1994
- Summary: Rudder hardover and loss of control due to design flaw
- Site: Hopewell Township, Beaver County, Pennsylvania, United States; 40°36′14.14″N 80°18′36.95″W

Aircraft
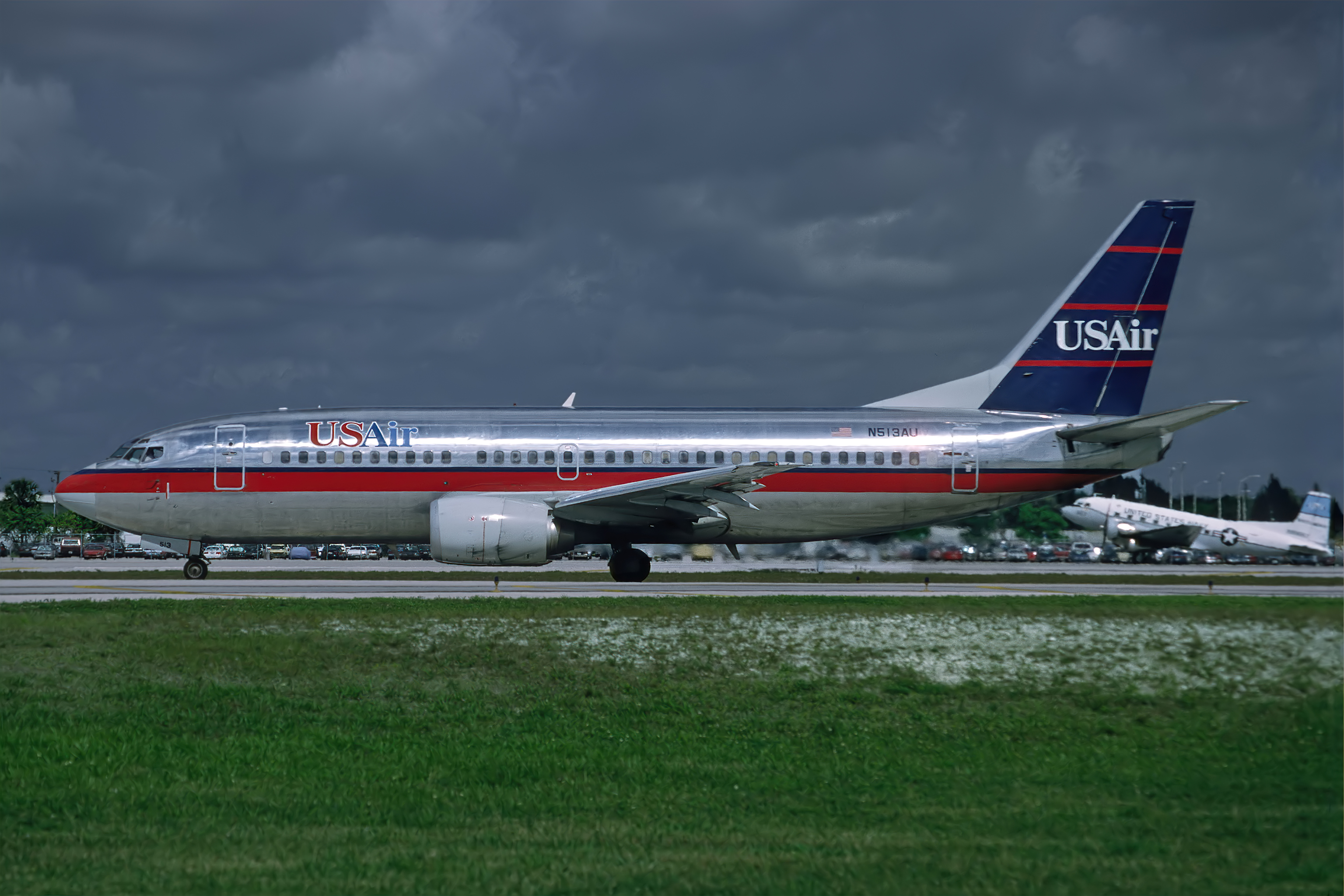
- N513AU, the aircraft involved in the accident, pictured in February 1994
- Aircraft type: Boeing 737-3B7
- Operator: USAir
- IATA flight No.: US427
- ICAO flight No.: USA427
- Call sign: US AIR 427
- Registration: N513AU
- Flight origin: O'Hare International Airport, Chicago, Illinois, United States
- Stopover: Pittsburgh International Airport, Moon Township, Allegheny County, Pennsylvania, United States
- Destination: Palm Beach International Airport, Palm Beach County, Florida, United States
- Occupants: 132
- Passengers: 127
- Crew: 5
- Fatalities: 132
- Survivors: 0

USAir Flight 427 was a scheduled flight from Chicago's O'Hare International Airport to Palm Beach International Airport, Florida, with a stopover at Pittsburgh International Airport. On Thursday, September 8, 1994, the Boeing 737-300 flying this route crashed in Hopewell Township, Beaver County, Pennsylvania while approaching Runway 28R at Pittsburgh, which was USAir's largest hub at the time.

This accident led to the second longest air crash investigation in history. The investigation into USAir 427 helped to also solve the 1991 crash, with no survivors, of United Airlines Flight 585. The National Transportation Safety Board (NTSB) determined that the probable cause was that the aircraft's rudder malfunctioned and went hard over in a direction opposite to that commanded by the pilots, causing the plane to enter an aerodynamic stall from which Captain Peter Germano and First Officer Charles B. Emmet III were unable to recover. All 132 people on board died, making the accident the deadliest air disaster in Pennsylvania's history. (Note: While the larger Boeing 757-222 aircraft flown as United Airlines Flight 93, on 11 September 2001, had capacity for 200+ passengers and crew, there were only 44 people onboard when the terrorists crashed it in Pennsylvania) The reports indicated that hot hydraulic fluid entering the rudder's dual servo valve froze, causing the rudder to work in the opposite direction.

== Background ==
=== Aircraft ===
The aircraft involved, manufactured in 1987, was a Boeing 737-3B7 registered as N513AU with serial number 23699. It had logged a total of 23,846 hours of flight time and performed 14,489 take-off and landing cycles. It was powered by two CFM International CFM56-3B-2 engines.

=== Crew ===
The flight crew consisted of Captain Peter Germano, aged 45, who was hired by USAir on February 4, 1981, and First Officer Charles B. "Chuck" Emmett III, aged 38, who was hired in February 1987 by Piedmont Airlines (which merged into USAir in 1989). Both were regarded as excellent pilots and were very experienced: Germano logged approximately 12,000 flight hours, including 4,064 on the Boeing 737, while Emmett logged 9,119 flight hours, 3,644 on the 737. Flight attendants Stanley Canty and April Slater were hired in 1989 by Piedmont Airlines. Flight attendant Sarah Slocum-Hamley was hired in October 1988 by USAir.

== Accident ==
Chase view of accident based on information from the flight data recorder.

In its arrival phase approaching Pittsburgh, Flight 427 was sequenced behind Delta Air Lines Flight 1083, a Boeing 727-200. At no time was Flight 427 closer than 4.1 miles (6.6 km) to Delta 1083, according to radar data. Flight 427 was on approach at 6,000 feet (1,800 m) altitude, at flaps 1 (eight degrees) configuration, and at approximately 190 knots (220 mph; 350 km/h).

At 19:02:57, the aircraft entered the wake turbulence of Delta 1083, and three sudden thumps, clicking sounds and a louder thump occurred, after which the 737 began to bank and roll to the left. The autopilot disconnected, and First Officer Emmett stomped on the right rudder pedal, and held it there for the remainder of the flight, unaware that the rudder had reversed hard to the left. As the aircraft's heading and bank angle skewed dramatically to the left, Emmett and Germano both rolled their yokes to the right and pulled back on the elevators to counter the gradually decreasing pitch angle, as the stick shaker activated and the airplane entered an aerodynamic stall, caused by the wing's critical high angle of attack.

As the stick shaker activated, Germano exclaimed "Hold on!" frequently, while Emmett, under physical exertion, said, "Oh shit!" Germano exclaimed, "What the hell is this?" As Pittsburgh air traffic control noticed Flight 427 descending without permission, and requested for them to return to 6,000 feet (1,800 m), Germano keyed the microphone and stated, "Four-twenty-seven, emergency!" Under duress, Germano left the microphone keyed for the rest of the accident; the ensuing exclamations in the cockpit were heard in the tower at Pittsburgh.

The aircraft completed one full roll, remaining in a nose-down pitch. Trying to counteract sharply rising G-forces, Germano yelled "Pull!" three consecutive times before screaming, during which Emmett stated "God, no" seconds before impact. Pitched 80° nose-down and banked 60° left while traveling at approximately 300 mph (260 kn; 480 km/h), the 737 slammed into a gravel road in a wooded ravine and exploded at 19:03:25 in Hopewell Township, Beaver County, near Aliquippa, approximately 28 seconds after entering the wake turbulence.

At the time of the accident, many people had gathered at the nearby Hopewell Soccer Club Fields for evening soccer practice. These people witnessed the crash of the aircraft and described the plane as suddenly falling out of the sky. The aircraft narrowly missed impacting the I-376 interchange just east of the Green Garden shopping plaza, where some witnesses took cover. Power was knocked out in the Giant Eagle after the crash.

After several failed attempts to raise the downed flight on radar, Pittsburgh air traffic control raised the alarm and local fire companies and EMS were hailed. Upon arriving at the scene, however, the aircraft was found to be obliterated, and not only was it evident that there were no survivors, but the fragmented human remains constituted a bio-hazard.

All 132 aboard Flight 427 were killed, making it the deadliest aviation accident in Pennsylvania's history.

== Investigation ==
Early NTSB animation video based on the flight recorder data. Note the correlation between the control yoke position and the bank angle.

Cockpit view based on information from the flight data recorder. When the rudder reversal occurred, the aircraft was flying at or below "crossover speed," the point at which the ailerons can counteract a fully deflected rudder. By pulling back on the yokes to maintain altitude, the pilots stalled the plane and unknowingly made it impossible for the ailerons to counteract the roll induced by the rudder.

The NTSB investigated the crash. All 127 passengers and 5 crew members on board were killed. For the first time in NTSB history, investigators were required to wear full-body biohazard suits while inspecting the accident site. As a result of the severity of the crash impact, the bodies of the passengers and crew were severely fragmented, leading investigators to declare the site a biohazard, requiring 2,000 body bags for the 6,000 recovered human remains. USAir had difficulty determining Flight 427's passenger list, facing confusion regarding five or six passengers. Several employees of the United States Department of Energy had tickets to take later flights, but used them to fly on Flight 427. One young child was not ticketed. Among the victims of the crash was noted neuroethologist Walter Heiligenberg.

Both the cockpit voice recorder (CVR) and flight data recorder (FDR) were recovered and used for the investigation. Because of the limited parameters recorded by the FDR, investigators did not have access to the position of the flight-control surfaces (rudder, ailerons, elevator, etc.) during the accident sequence. However, two parameters recorded were crucial — the aircraft's heading and the pitch-control yoke position. During the approach, Flight 427 encountered wake turbulence from Delta 1083, but the FAA determined "the wake vortex encounter alone would not have caused the continued heading change that occurred after 19:03:00." The abrupt heading change shortly before the dive pointed investigators immediately to the rudder. Without data relating to the rudder pedal positions, investigators attempted to determine whether the rudder moved hard over by a malfunction or by pilot command. The CVR was heavily scrutinized as investigators examined the pilots' words and their breathing to determine whether they were fighting for control over a rudder malfunction or had inadvertently stomped on the wrong rudder pedal in reaction to the wake turbulence. Boeing felt the latter more likely, while USAir and the pilots' union felt that the former was more likely. The FDR revealed that after the aircraft stalled, the plane and its occupants were subjected to a load as high as 4 g throughout the dive until impact with the ground in an 80-degree nose-down attitude at approximately 300 mph (480 km/h) under significant sideslip.

Reading the control-yoke data from the FDR revealed that the pilots made a crucial error by pulling back on the yoke throughout the dive, with the stick shaker audible on the CVR from the onset of the dive. This raised the aircraft's angle of attack, removed all aileron authority, prevented recovery from the roll induced by the rudder and caused an aerodynamic stall. Because the aircraft had entered a slip, pulling back on the yoke only further aggravated the bank angle. Boeing's test pilots reenacted the dive in a simulator and in a test 737-300 by flying with the same parameters recorded by the accident FDR, and found that recovery from a fully deflected rudder at level flight, while at 190-knot crossover speed, was accomplished by turning the wheel to the opposite direction of the roll, and not pulling back on the yoke to regain aileron authority. The FAA later remarked that the CVR proved that the pilots failed to utilize proper crew resource management during the upset while continuing to apply full up elevator after receiving a stall warning. The NTSB remarked that no airline had ever trained a pilot to properly recover from the situation experienced by the Flight 427 pilots and that the pilots had just 10 seconds from the onset of the roll to troubleshoot before recovery of the aircraft was impossible.

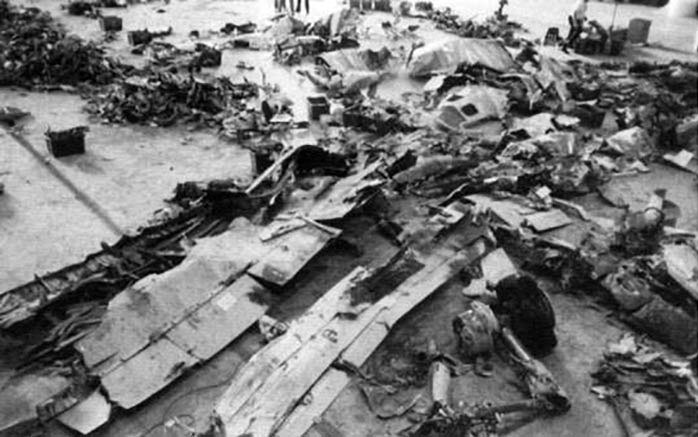
Recovered wreckage under examination

Investigators later discovered that the recovered accident rudder power control unit was much more sensitive to bench tests than new control units. The exact mechanism of the failure involved the servo valve, which remains dormant and cold for much of the flight at high altitude, seizing after being injected with hot hydraulic fluid that has been in continuous action throughout the plane. This specific condition occurred in fewer than 1% of the laboratory tests, but explained the rudder malfunction that caused Flight 427 to crash. The jam left no trace of evidence after it occurred, and a Boeing engineer later found that a jam under this controlled condition could also lead to the slide moving in the opposite direction than that commanded. Boeing felt that the test results were unrealistic and inapplicable, given the extremes under which the valve was tested. It stated that the cause of the rudder reversal was more likely psychological and likened the event to a circumstance in which an automobile driver panics during an accident and accidentally presses on the gas pedal rather than the brake pedal. The official position of the Federal Aviation Administration (FAA) was that sufficient probable cause did not exist to substantiate the possibility of rudder system failure.

After the longest accident investigation in NTSB history — lasting more than four and a half years — the NTSB released its final report on March 24, 1999. The NTSB concluded that the accident was the result of mechanical failure:

The National Transportation Safety Board determines that the probable cause of the USAir Flight 427 accident was a loss of control of the airplane resulting from the movement of the rudder surface to its blowdown limit. (Note: Blowdown limit is the maximum deflection that a control surface is capable of reaching under given flight conditions.) The rudder surface most likely deflected in a direction opposite to that commanded by the pilots as a result of a jam of the main rudder power control unit servo valve secondary slide to the servo valve housing offset from its neutral position and overtravel of the primary slide.

The NTSB concluded that similar rudder problems had caused the previously mysterious March 3, 1991, crash of United Airlines Flight 585 and the June 9, 1996, incident involving Eastwind Airlines Flight 517, both Boeing 737s. The final report also included detailed responses to Boeing's arguments about the causes of the three accidents.

== Aftermath ==
At the time of the crash, Flight 427 was the second-deadliest accident involving a Boeing 737 (all series); as of 2024, it now ranks as the ninth-deadliest. It was also the seventh-deadliest aviation disaster in the history of the United States, and the deadliest in the U.S. involving a 737; as of 2024, it ranks eleventh. The accident marked USAir's fifth crash in the period from 1989 to 1994. The Commonwealth of Pennsylvania spent approximately $500,000 in recovery and cleanup for the accident site.

The FAA disagreed with the NTSB's probable-cause verdict and Tom McSweeney, the FAA's director of aircraft certification, issued a statement on the same day on which the NTSB report was issued that read: "We believe, as much as we have studied this aircraft and this rudder system, that the actions we have taken assure a level of safety that is commensurate with any aircraft."

However, the FAA changed its attitude after a special task force, the Engineering Test and Evaluation Board, reported in July 2000 that it had detected 46 potential failures and jams in the 737 rudder system that could have catastrophic effects. In September 2000, the FAA announced that it wanted Boeing to redesign the rudder for all iterations of the 737, affecting more than 3,400 aircraft in the U.S. alone.

USAir submitted to the NTSB that pilots should receive training with regard to a plane's crossover speed and recovery from full rudder deflection. As a result, pilots were warned of and trained how to deal with insufficient aileron authority at an airspeed at or less than 190 knots (352 km/h), formerly the usual approach speed for a Boeing 737. Boeing maintained that the most likely cause of the accident was that the co-pilot inadvertently deflected the rudder hard over in the wrong direction while in a panic and for unknown reasons maintained this input until impact with the ground. Boeing agreed to redesign the rudder control system with a redundant backup and paid to retrofit the entire worldwide 737 fleet. Following one of the NTSB's main recommendations, airlines were required to add four additional channels of information into flight data recorders in order to capture pilot rudder pedal commands, and the FAA set a deadline of August 2001 for airlines to comply. In 2016, former investigator John Cox stated that time has proven the NTSB correct in its findings, because no additional rudder-reversal incidents have occurred since Boeing's redesign.

Following the airline's response to the Flight 427 accident, the United States Congress required that airlines "provide families of crash victims courteous and sensitive treatment and assistance with the various needs that accompany an accident".

USAir ceased using Flight 427 as a flight number. The accident was the second fatal USAir crash in just over two months, following the July 2 Flight 1016 accident at Charlotte-Douglas International Airport that killed 37. The crashes contributed to the financial crisis that USAir was experiencing at the time.

== Memorial ==
The crash site, near the Aliquippa exit of I-376, is located on private property. The road to the site is accessible only to 427 Support League and Pine Creek Land Conservation Trust members. Attesting to the violent disintegration of the aircraft, small debris can still be found around the memorial to this day. Tradition holds that any wreckage found is placed upon the stone memorial.

Three tombstones are located at the Sewickley Cemetery, 10 miles (16 km) from the site of the crash and within the flight path of USAir 427.

== In popular culture ==
- The Discovery Channel Canada / National Geographic TV series Mayday — also known as Air Disasters — dramatized the crash of Flight 427 and the subsequent 737 rudder investigation in the 2007 episode "Hidden Danger".
- The accident was dramatized in the episode "Fatal Flaws" of Why Planes Crash.

== See also ==
- Boeing 737 rudder issues

=== Similar incidents ===
- American Airlines Flight 1
- Northwest Airlines Flight 85
- American Airlines Flight 587
- Indonesia AirAsia Flight 8501
- Aeroflot Flight 1802
