= United Airlines Flight 585 =

1991 aviation accident in Colorado

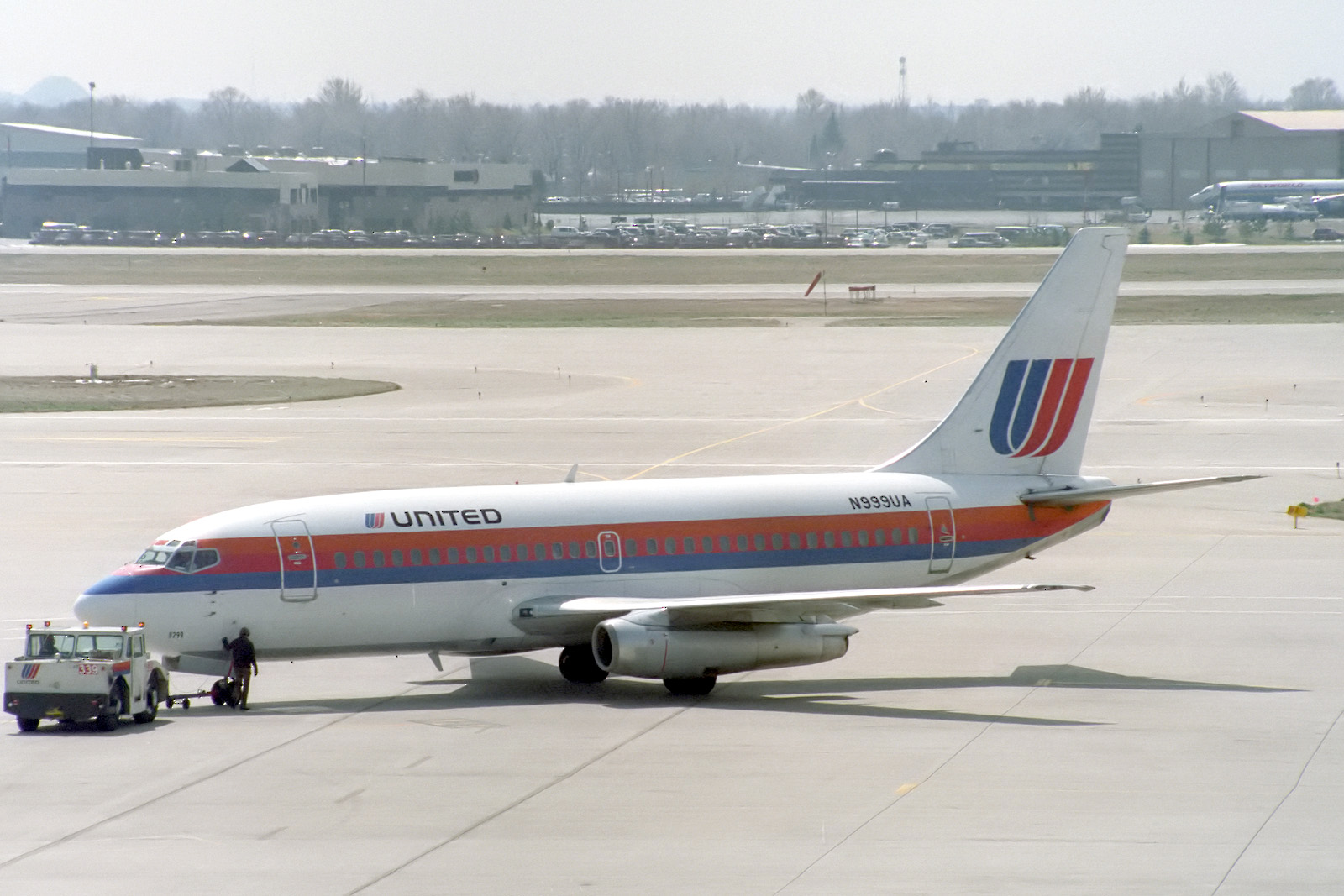
- N999UA, the aircraft involved in the accident, pictured in April 1989

Accident
- Date: March 3, 1991
- Summary: Rudder hardover and loss of control due to design flaw
- Site: Widefield Park, near Colorado Springs Municipal Airport, United States; 38°44′09.4″N 104°42′42.4″W
- Total fatalities: 25
- Total injuries: 1

Aircraft
- Aircraft type: Boeing 737-291
- Operator: United Airlines
- IATA flight No.: UA585
- ICAO flight No.: UAL585
- Call sign: UNITED 585
- Registration: N999UA
- Flight origin: Greater Peoria Regional Airport
- Stopover: Quad Cities International Airport
- Last stopover: Stapleton International Airport
- Destination: Colorado Springs Municipal Airport
- Occupants: 25
- Passengers: 20
- Crew: 5
- Fatalities: 25
- Survivors: 0

Ground casualties
- Ground injuries: 1

United Airlines Flight 585 was a scheduled passenger flight on March 3, 1991, from Denver to Colorado Springs, Colorado, United States, carrying 20 passengers and 5 crew members. The Boeing 737-200 experienced a rudder hardover while on final approach to runway 35 at Colorado Springs Municipal Airport, causing the plane to roll over and enter an uncontrolled dive. All on board died on impact.

The National Transportation Safety Board (NTSB) was initially unable to resolve the cause of the crash, but after similar accidents and incidents involving Boeing 737 aircraft, including the fatal crash of USAir Flight 427, the crash was determined to be caused by a defect in the design of the 737's rudder power control unit which caused the rudder to work in the opposite direction.

== Background ==
=== Aircraft ===
Flight 585 was operated by a Boeing 737-291, registered as N999UA with serial number 22742. It was manufactured in May 1982 for Frontier Airlines, and was acquired by United Airlines on June 6, 1986, when the former went out of business (a new airline company with the same name formed eight years later). On the date of the accident, the aircraft had logged 26,050 flight hours in 19,734 takeoff and landing cycles.

=== Crew ===
In command was Captain Harold Green, aged 52. Green was hired by United Airlines on May 15, 1969, and had logged 9,902 hours as a United Airlines pilot (including 1,732 hours on the Boeing 737), and was regarded by colleagues as a conservative pilot who always followed standard operating procedures. The first officer was Patricia Eidson, aged 42. Eidson was hired by UAL on November 21, 1988, and had logged 3,903 flight hours (including 1,077 hours on the Boeing 737).

On February 25, 1991, the aircraft was flying at 10,000 feet (3,000 m) when the rudder abruptly deflected 10 degrees to the right. The crew on board reduced power and the aircraft returned to normal flight. A similar event occurred two days later. Four days later, the aircraft crashed.

== Accident ==
Flight 585 was a regularly scheduled flight, originating at General Wayne A. Downing Peoria International Airport in Peoria, Illinois to Colorado Springs, Colorado, making intermediate stops at Quad Cities International Airport in Moline, Illinois, with an intended final stop at Stapleton International Airport in Denver, Colorado, at 09:46 Mountain Standard Time (16:46 UTC). On March 3, 1991, the flight operated from Peoria to Denver without incident.

At 09:23 (16:23 UTC), Flight 585 departed Denver with 20 passengers and 5 crew members on board. At 09:30:37 (16:30:37 UTC), the aircraft received Automatic terminal information service "Lima", that was about 40 minutes old, stating "Wind three one zero at one three gust three five; low level wind shear advisories are in effect, local aviation wind warning in effect calling for winds out of the northwest gust to 40 knots (74 km/h; 46 mph) and above." The flight crew added 20 knots (37 km/h; 23 mph) to their target landing airspeed based on this information.

At 09:32:35, First Officer Eidson reported to Colorado Springs Approach Control that their altitude was 11,000 feet (3,400 m). Colorado Springs Approach then cleared the flight for a visual approach to runway 35 (now 35L) and instructed the flight to contact Colorado Springs Tower.

At 09:37:59 (16:37:59 UTC) Colorado Springs Tower cleared Flight 585 to land on runway 35, notifying the flight that wind was 320 degrees at 16 knots (30 km/h; 18 mph) with gusts to 29 knots (54 km/h; 33 mph). At this moment, the aircraft was at 8,000 feet (2,400 m). First Officer Eidson inquired about reports from other aircraft about airspeed changes, and at 09:38:29 (16:38:29 UTC) the tower replied that another 737 had reported a 15-knot (28 km/h; 17 mph) loss at 500 feet (150 m), a 15-knot (28 km/h; 17 mph) gain at 400 feet (120 m), and a 20-knot (37 km/h; 23 mph) gain at 150 feet (46 m), at approximately 09:20 (16:20 UTC), 17 minutes prior. Eidson replied, "Sounds adventurous... United five eighty-five, thank you."

At 09:40:07 (16:40:07 UTC), Flight 585 was informed of traffic, a Cessna at their eleven o'clock, 5 miles (8.0 km) northwest bound, landing at runway 30. The crew was unable to locate the traffic, but 37 seconds after it was reported, the tower informed the flight that the traffic was now behind them. This Cessna was located about 4 miles (6.4 km) northeast of the accident when it occurred, and he had also reported slight, occasional, moderate chop at 7,000 feet (2,100 m). The Cessna pilot had also noted indicated airspeed fluctuations between 65 knots (120 km/h; 75 mph) and 105 knots (194 km/h; 121 mph) with vertical speed indications of approximately 500 feet (150 m) per minute.

At 09:41:23 (16:41:23 UTC), air traffic control directed Flight 585 to hold short of runway 30 after landing to allow for departing traffic. Eidson replied "We'll hold short of three-zero, United five eighty five." This was the last transmission received from the flight.

In the final minute of the flight, normal acceleration varied between 0.6–1.3g, with an airspeed of 155 knots (287 km/h; 178 mph) with 2 to 10 knot excursions.

About 20 seconds prior to the crash, the aircraft entered into a controlled 20-degree bank and turn for alignment with the runway. Around four seconds later, First Officer Eidson informed Captain Green that they were at 1,000 feet (300 m).

Within the next four seconds, at 09:43:33 (16:43:33 UTC), the aircraft suddenly rolled to the right, heading rate increasing to about 5-degrees per second as a result, nearly twice that of a standard rate turn, and pitched nose down. First Officer Eidson stated "Oh God, [flip]!", and in the same moment Captain Green called for 15-degrees of flaps while increasing thrust, in an attempt to initiate a go-around. The altitude decreased rapidly and acceleration increased to over 4G until, at 09:43:41 (16:43:41 UTC), the aircraft crashed at an 80-degree nose-down angle, yawed 4-degrees to the right, into Widefield Park, less than four miles (6 km) from the runway threshold, at a speed of 245 miles per hour (215 kn; 395 km/h). The aircraft was destroyed on impact and by the post-crash fire. According to the accident report, the crash carved a crater 39 by 24 feet (12 m × 7.3 m) and 15 ft (5 m) deep. Segments of the 737 were buried deep within this crater, requiring excavation. Everyone on board was killed instantly. The aircraft narrowly missed a row of apartments; a girl standing in the doorway of one of the apartments was knocked backwards by the force of the explosion, hitting her head, but was released from a local hospital with no further problems after treatment.

== Victims ==
Nationalities of passengers and crew
Nationality	Passengers	Crew	Total
Canada	1	—N/a	1
Ireland	1	—N/a	1
Japan	1	—N/a	1
Poland	1	—N/a	1
United States	16	5	21
Total	20	5	25

== Investigation ==
=== Initial investigation ===
The National Transportation Safety Board (NTSB) released its concluding report into the crash that occurred on March 3, 1991, involving United Airlines Flight 585. Based on the findings of the research, it was determined that the crash was brought about by a mechanical breakdown in the rudder power control unit of the aircraft.

The NTSB's initial report on the crash was released in December 1992, but it ruled the probable cause as undetermined. The agency reopened the investigation in September 1994 after another crash of USAir Flight 427 that was under similar conditions. The NTSB's investigation considered data from the crash of Flight 585, as well as other incidents, including a non-fatal crash in 1996 of Eastwind Airlines flight 517 The NTSB finalized its report on United 585 Report #AAR-01-01 on March 3, 2001.

Although the flight data recorder (FDR) outer protective case was damaged, the data tape inside was intact and all of the data were recoverable. Five parameters were recorded by the FDR: heading, altitude, airspeed, normal acceleration (G loads), and microphone keying. The FDR did not record rudder, aileron or spoiler deflection data, which could have aided the NTSB in reconstructing the plane's final moments. The data available proved insufficient to establish why the plane suddenly went into the fatal dive. The NTSB considered the possibilities of a malfunction of the rudder power control unit servo (which might have caused the rudder to reverse) and the effect that powerful rotor winds from the nearby Rocky Mountains may have had, but there was not enough evidence to prove either hypothesis.

The cockpit voice recorder (CVR) was also damaged, though the data tape inside was intact. However, the data tape featured creases that resulted in poor playback quality. The CVR recorded the pilots making a verbal (and possible physical) response to the loss of control.

The first NTSB report (issued on December 8, 1992) did not conclude with the usual "probable cause". Instead, it stated:

The National Transportation Safety Board, after an exhaustive investigation effort, could not identify conclusive evidence to explain the loss of United Airlines Flight 585.

=== Intervening events ===
Following the failure to identify the cause of Flight 585's crash, another Boeing 737 crash occurred under very similar circumstances when USAir Flight 427 crashed while attempting to land in Pennsylvania in 1994.

=== Renewed investigation and probable cause ===
The NTSB reopened its investigation into Flight 585 in parallel with the USAir Flight 427 investigation, due to the similar nature of the circumstances.

During the NTSB's renewed investigation, it was determined that the crash of Flight 585 (and the later Flight 427 crash) was the result of a sudden malfunction of the aircraft's rudder power control unit. Another incident (non-fatal) that contributed to the conclusion was that of Eastwind Airlines Flight 517, which had a similar problem in Virginia in 1996. On March 27, 2001, the NTSB issued a revised final report for Flight 585, which found that the pilots lost control of the airplane because of a mechanical malfunction. The renewed investigation concluded with a "probable cause" that stated:

The National Transportation Safety Board determines that the probable cause of the United Airlines flight 585 accident was a loss of control of the airplane resulting from the movement of the rudder surface to its blowdown limit. The rudder surface most likely deflected in a direction opposite to that commanded by the pilots as a result of a jam of the main rudder power control unit servo valve secondary slide to the servo valve housing offset from its neutral position and overtravel of the primary slide.

== Memorial ==
A memorial garden honoring the victims is located at Widefield Park. The garden consists of a gazebo and 25 trees planted in honor of the victims.

== In popular culture ==
The Discovery Channel Canada / National Geographic TV series Mayday – also known in the U.S. as Air Disasters – dramatized the crash of Flight 585 and the subsequent 737 rudder investigation in a 2007 episode titled "Hidden Danger".

The crash is also dramatized in the episode "Fatal Flaws" of Why Planes Crash.

== See also ==
- Boeing 737 rudder issues
- Eastwind Airlines Flight 517
- USAir Flight 427
- Alaska Airlines Flight 261
- American Airlines Flight 1
- Northwest Airlines Flight 85
- TWA Flight 841 (1979)
