= 2023 Coulson Aviation Boeing 737 crash =

2023 aviation accident in Australia

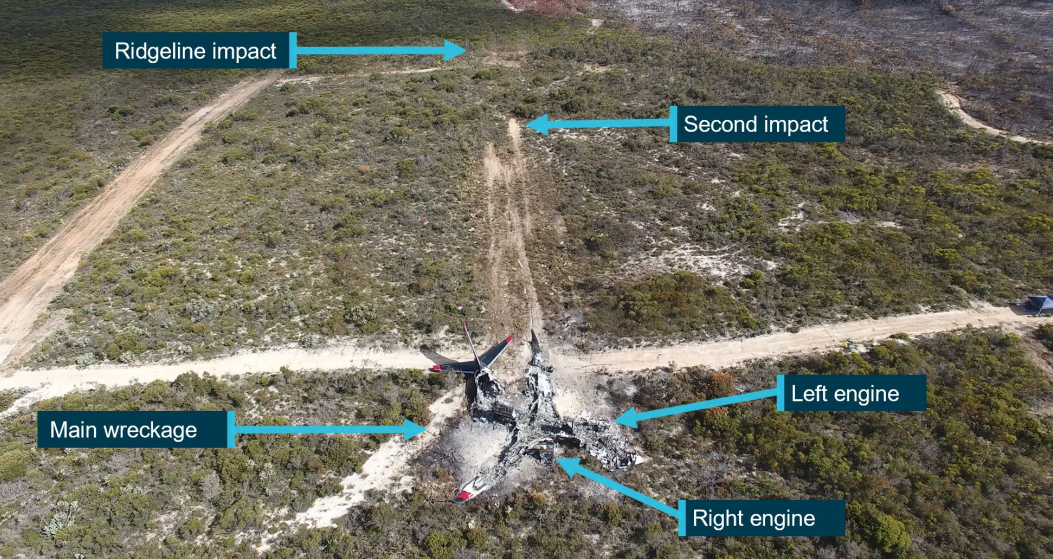
- Aerial view of the crash site

Accident
- Date: 6 February 2023
- Summary: Controlled flight into terrain after retardant drop due to insufficient airspeed and thrust
- Site: Fitzgerald River National Park, Western Australia

Aircraft
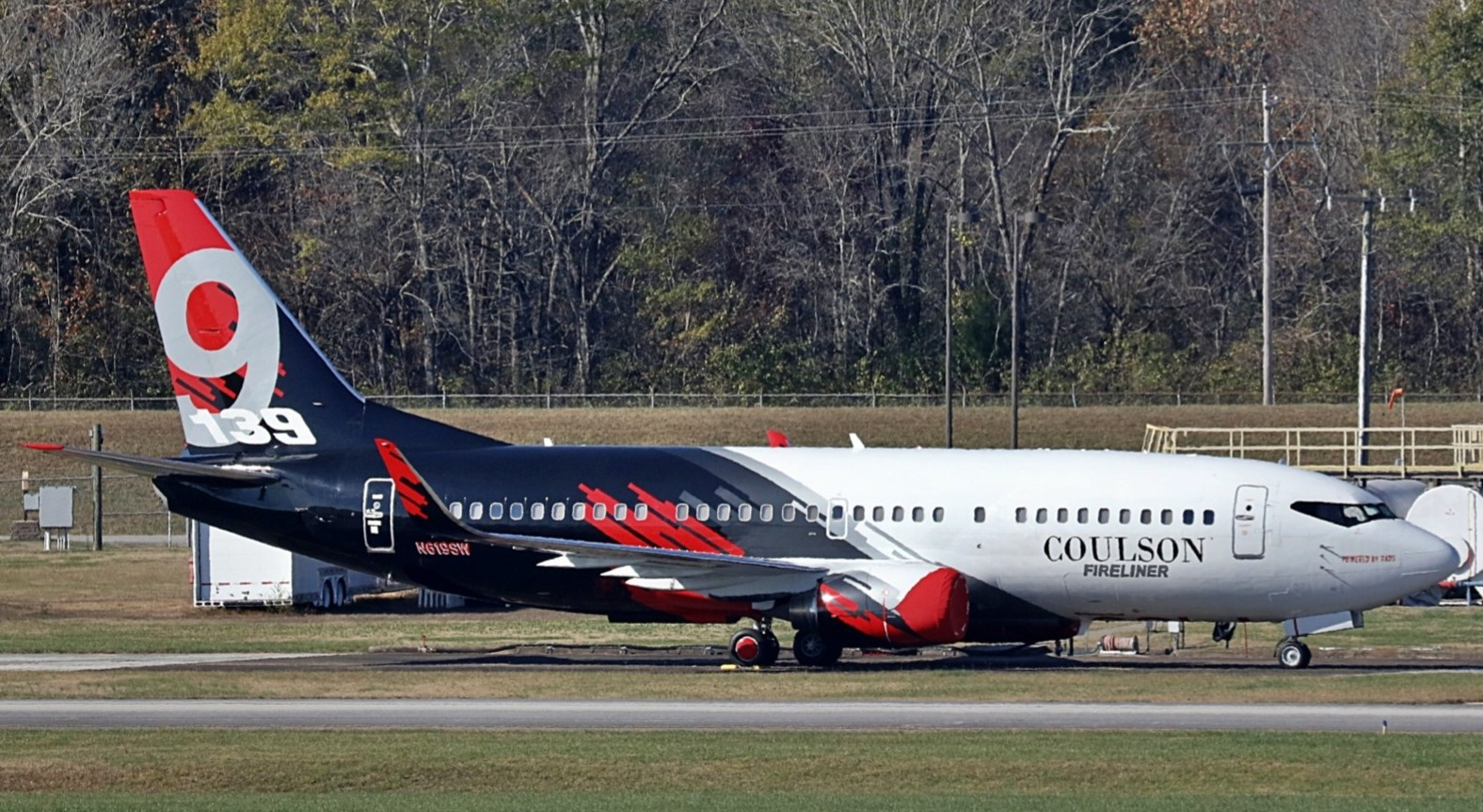
- N619SW, the aircraft involved in the accident, photographed in 2022
- Aircraft type: Boeing 737-3H4 (Note: The aircraft involved was a Boeing 737-300, that was previously operated by Southwest Airlines. The customer code for Southwest Airlines is H4, and this was assigned for airline companies that bought their aircraft between 1958 and 2017. This note means that the aircraft was a 737-7H4.)
- Operator: Coulson Aviation (Australia)
- Call sign: BMBR139
- Registration: N619SW
- Flight origin: Busselton Margaret River Airport
- Destination: Busselton Margaret River Airport
- Occupants: 2
- Crew: 2
- Fatalities: 0
- Injuries: 2
- Survivors: 2

On 6 February 2023, a Boeing 737-300 owned by Coulson Aviation and used as an air tanker crashed in the Fitzgerald River National Park in the Great Southern Region of Western Australia while fighting multiple fires. The two crew members aboard—both pilots—survived with minor injuries and were taken to the hospital. The aircraft was destroyed, and resulted in the first hull loss of a Boeing 737 in Australia.

== Aircraft and crew ==
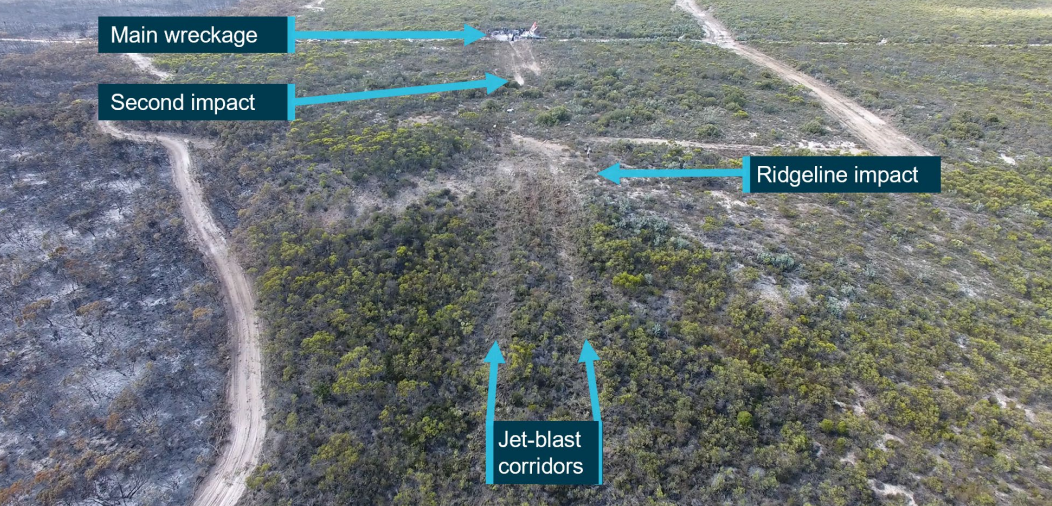
The trail after the impact

The aircraft involved in the accident was a 27-year-old Boeing 737-300, with serial number 28035 and registered as N619SW. The aircraft was the 2762nd 737 built, and was delivered new to Southwest Airlines in November 1995. It was retired by Southwest in August 2017 and transferred to Coulson Aviation later that month. After a period of storage and conversion, it began operating as an air tanker in July 2022.

The captain was a male who had been working for Coulson Aviation since 2016, and had 8,233 flight hours, of which, 1,399 were on the 737, and 5,500 were in aerial firefighting. The co-pilot was also a male who had been working for Coulson Aviation since 18 April 2022, with 5,852 flight hours, which 128 of which were on the 737. He had spent about 500 flight hours in aerial firefighting.

== Accident timeline ==
On 6 February 2023, at 12:08 pm, the aircraft involved took off from the Busselton Margaret River Airport on the first of three missions that day to respond to a fire near Hopetoun. En route to the fires, the aircraft climbed to 29,000 feet (8,800 m), before descending to around 700 feet (210 m) over the fire zone once. It returned to the same airport at 1:26 pm. After taking on a new retardant load, it took off at 1:50 pm for the second mission. The aircraft climbed out of the area and returned to its base at 3:08 pm, after descending once over the fire zone.

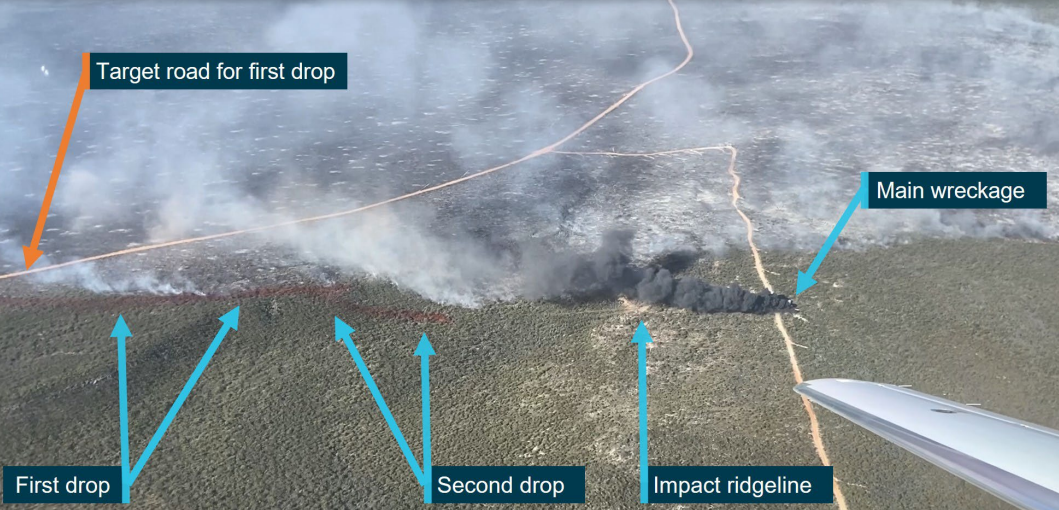
The aftermath view of N619SW from another aircraft

On its third mission, it took off at 3:32 pm. This time the air tanker descended two times over the fire zone, crashing at 4:14 pm while executing the second descent in the Fitzgerald River National Park.The aircraft had descended to 57 ft, at a speed of 110 kts, and were commencing the drop. The aircraft, running at about 30% power from the engines, began to climb and did so to 81 ft. At 107 kts, the captain increased power, however, the engines were slow to respond, and the stick shaker activated. The aircraft then stalled and collided with foliage, bounced, became airborne again, then crashed. After the aircraft had fully stopped moving, the co-pilot then started on the evacuation checklist, while the captain struggled to find an escape, as the cockpit door had buckled, and was unusable, and the right-side window unable to be opened by the co-pilot. The captain then noticed that there was a fire on the aircraft and both crew members subsequently escaped through the left-side window. Both crew members survived with minor injuries and were rescued by helicopter.

== Investigation ==
Following the accident, the Australian Transport Safety Bureau announced that a team was being assembled from Perth and Canberra to investigate the accident.

A report of the preliminary investigation released on 3 May 2023 stated that the aircraft had hit a ridge line while dropping retardant at a low altitude. Seconds earlier, the pilots had attempted to pitch the aircraft up, but its engines had not had sufficient time to accelerate. After the aircraft had slid to a rest, the pilots had been able to escape through the left side cockpit window only sustaining minor injuries.

On 6 November 2024, the final report was released, which determined that the accident was a controlled flight into terrain due to insufficient airspeed and thrust. The ATSB issued 11 recommendations, which are as follows:

1. Raising the minimum drop height.
2. Re-calibration of airspeed during partial load drops.
3. Pre-drop planning and familiarization
4. Monitoring pilot situational awareness
5. Better pilot training exercises
6. Better training on how to exit the flight path if something goes wrong.
7. Improved communication and coordination with "Birddog".
8. Adherence to standard operating procedures.
9. Better crew resource management (CRM).
10. Monitoring and considering human factors.
11. Continuous training and proficiency accessments.

== See also ==
- List of accidents and incidents involving the Boeing 737
- 2020 Coulson Aviation Lockheed C-130 Hercules crash, another accident involving the same airline
