= 2020 Coulson Aviation Lockheed EC-130 crash =

Aviation accident in Australia

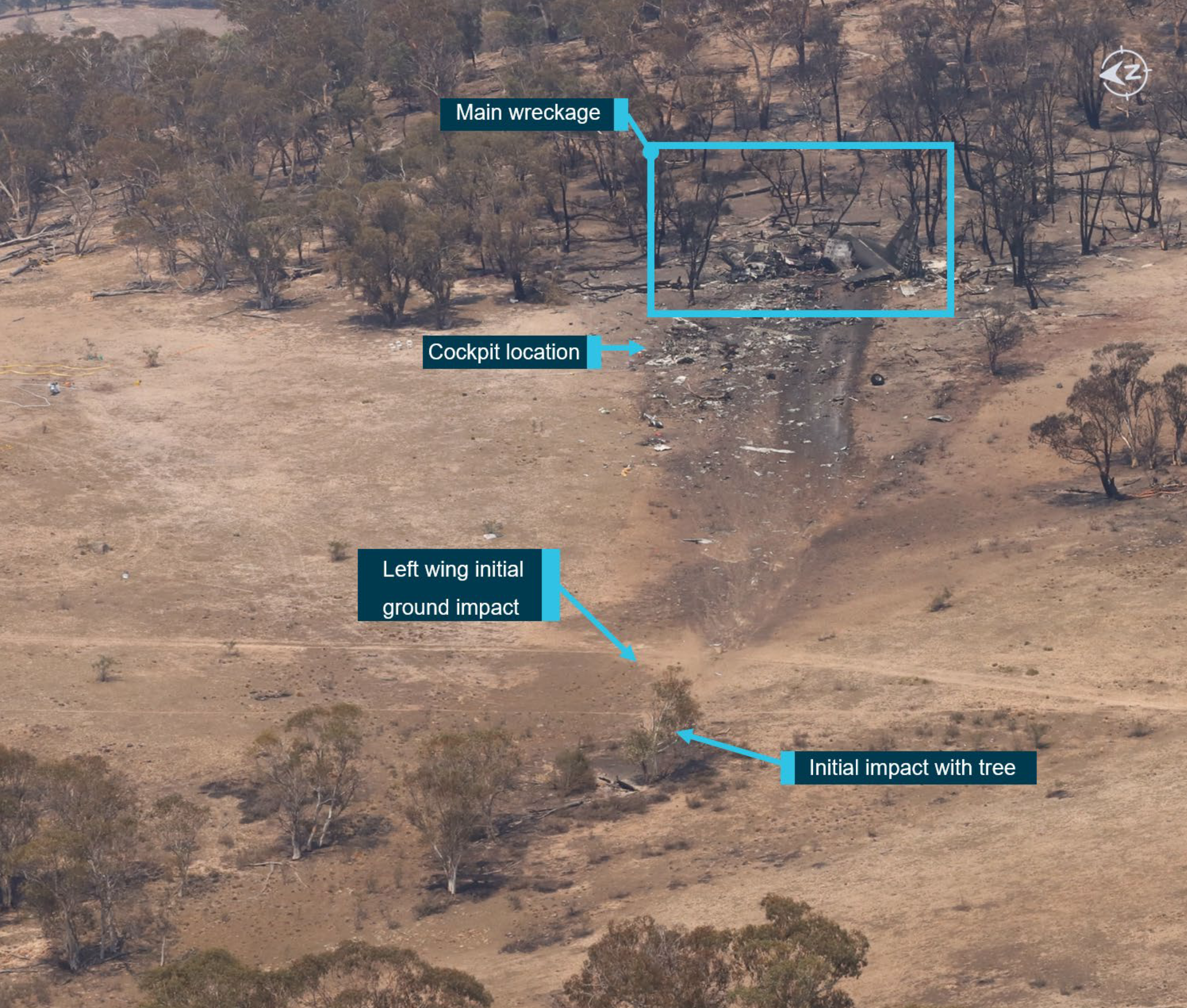
- Aerial view of the crash site

Accident
- Date: 23 January 2020
- Summary: Collision with terrain after a stall during hazardous weather conditions.
- Site: Peak View, 50 km north-east of Cooma, New South Wales; 36°00′20″S 149°23′04″E

Aircraft
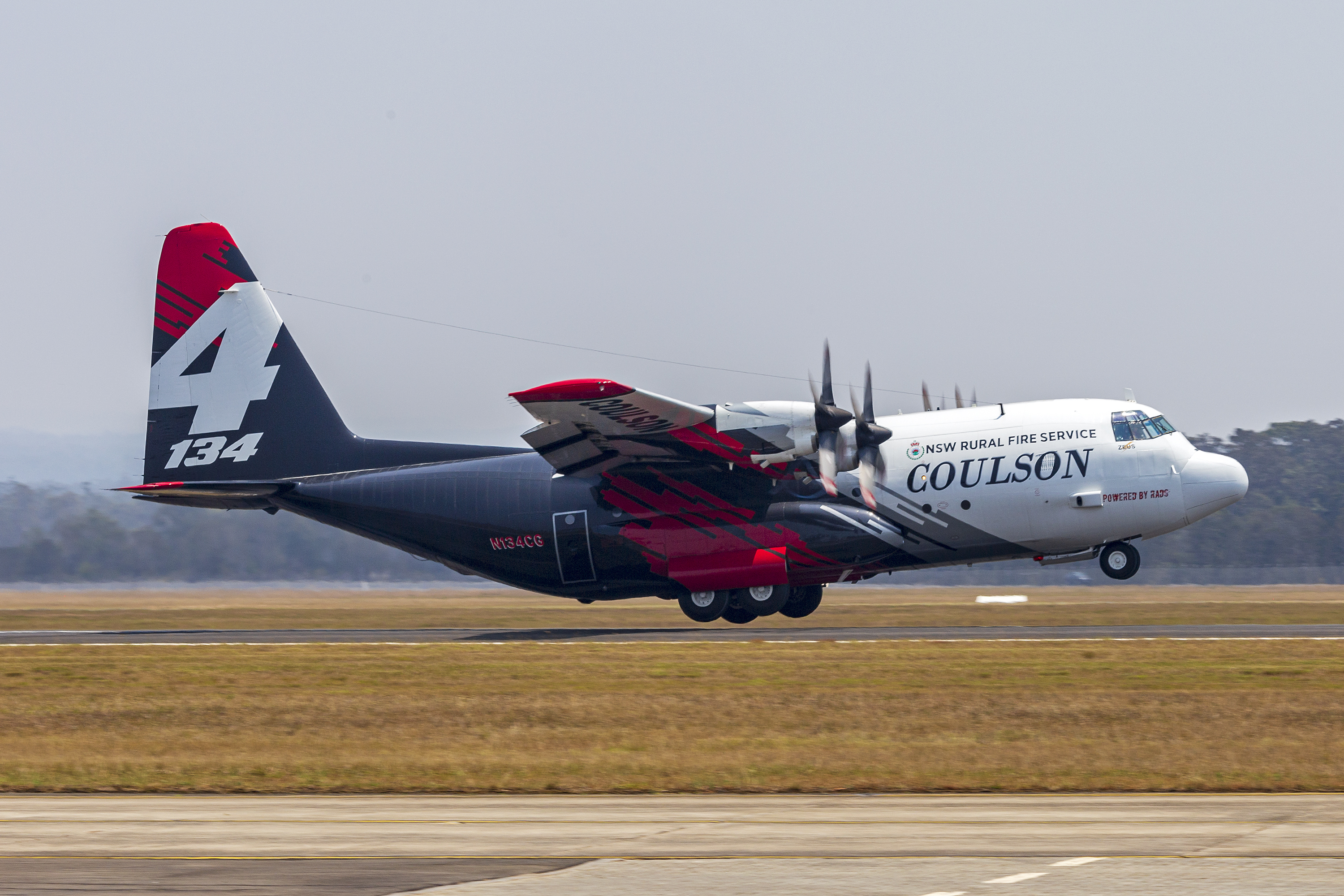
- N134CG, the aircraft involved in the accident, pictured in 2019
- Aircraft type: Lockheed EC-130Q Hercules
- Operator: Coulson Aviation (Australia)
- Call sign: Bomber 134 (B134)
- Registration: N134CG
- Flight origin: RAAF Base Richmond, New South Wales
- Destination: RAAF Base Richmond, New South Wales
- Occupants: 3
- Passengers: 0
- Crew: 3
- Fatalities: 3
- Survivors: 0

On 23 January 2020, a Lockheed EC-130Q Hercules, owned by Coulson Aviation, crashed while aerial firefighting for the New South Wales Rural Fire Service during Australia's black summer bushfires. All three crew on board the flight were fatally injured when the aircraft hit a tree before colliding with the ground, followed by a post-impact fuel-fed fire. The victims were US residents who were in Australia to help fight numerous substantial bushfires in the region.

The Australian Transport Safety Bureau (ATSB) determined the cause of the collision was likely due to the dangerous weather conditions, low-level wind shear and an increased tailwind, leading to the aircraft stalling while releasing fire retardant foam at a low height and airspeed and colliding with terrain.

== Background ==
Australia's black summer bushfires of 2019 and 2020 saw over 2000 homes destroyed, 24.3 million hectares (60 million acres) of land burnt, and 34 deaths on Australia's east coast. As part of the firefighting efforts, many small and large aircraft were used for both aerial firefighting and to provide emergency services with information on the bushfire's activities.

On 23 January 2020, at around 11 a.m., the New South Wales (NSW) Rural Fire Service (RFS) State Operations Centre tasked two air tankers and an observation aircraft from RAAF Base Richmond to the Adaminaby Fire-ground due to the escalating fire danger to the Adaminaby township and rural properties being under threat from a spreading fire paired with strong winds, severe fire weather conditions.

== Aircraft history ==
The aircraft, an EC-130Q Hercules, registered N134CG, was operated by Coulson Aviation (Australia) Pty Ltd and manufactured by the Lockheed Corporation in 1981. It was powered by four Allison T56-A-15 turboprop engines. The aircraft was previously owned by the US Navy who transferred it to NASA in 1992, who later placed it in storage. The aircraft was then retrofitted in 2018 by Coulson Aviation for the purpose of aerial firefighting and had a 4,000-U.S.-gallon (15,000 L) firefighting tank system installed. The aircraft had a total time-in-service of 11,888 hours, 683 of which were spent firefighting since its conversion in 2018.

The aircraft was in Australia because of a seasonal agreement the NSW RFS had with Canada's Coulson Aviation ahead of Australia's bushfire season.

== Timeline ==
=== Bomber 137 ===
Of the two air tankers, Bomber 137 (B137), a Boeing 737 aircraft, registered N137CG, departed the base at 11:27 am and arrived at the Adaminaby Fire-ground at around 11:55 am. The crew circled the planned drop area for around 25 minutes due to the weather conditions and because of ground-based firefighters in the planned drop area. During the flight, the B137 crew encountered a wind shear warning on the aircraft's computer system and strong winds causing uncontrolled banking of up to 45º. The B137 crew reported 50-knot (93 km/h) winds at 800 feet (240 m) above ground level and 37-knot (69 km/h) winds at 200 feet (61 m) above ground level. Having successfully deployed the fire retardant load, the B137 aircraft left the fire-ground at around 12:25 pm with the pilot-in-command (PIC) advising cancellation of aircraft operation in the area due to the "horrible" weather conditions. The B137 crew then received a request to reload the aircraft with fire retardant in Canberra and return to Adaminaby Fire-ground. The PIC replied that they would not be returning to the fire-ground as the "winds were getting too strong and the visibility is [low]."

=== Bomber 134 ===
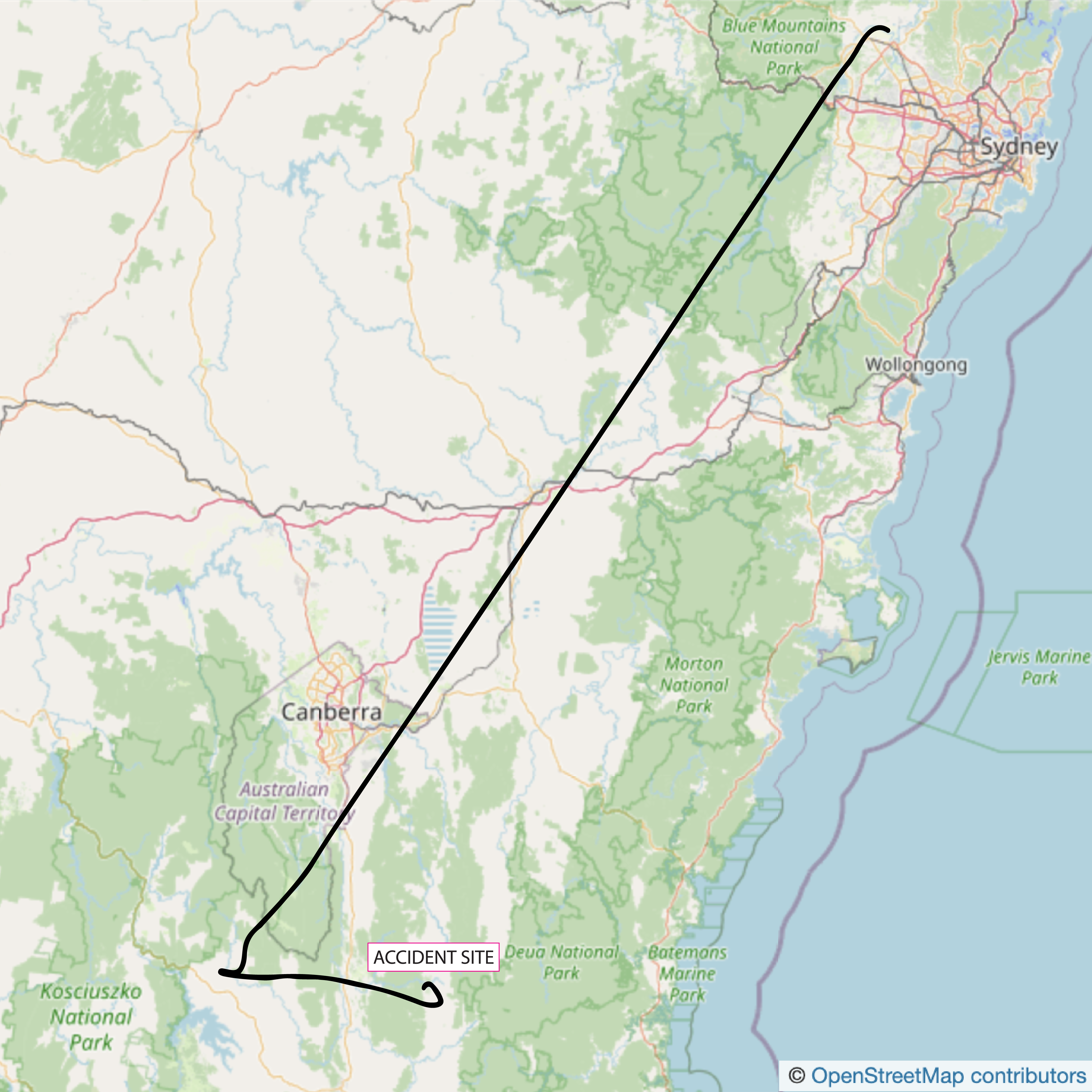
Flight path of B134

The second air tanker, Bomber 134 (B134), a Lockheed EC-130Q Hercules, registered N134CG, carrying three crew on board, departed the base at around 12:05 pm. At around 12:35 pm, while en route to the fire-ground, the PIC of B137 contacted the PIC of B134 informing them that due to the extreme winds, they would not be returning to the fire-ground. During this exchange, the PIC of B134 asked the PIC of B137 several questions about the conditions. With this information, the crew decided that they would continue to assess the conditions themselves. After arriving at the Adaminaby Fire-ground at around 12:51 pm the B134 crew made several orbits around the fire-ground at a height of around 2,000 feet (610 m) AGL and decided that the conditions were too unsafe for a retardant drop at the fire-ground. At around 12:55 pm, the crew informed the Cooma Fire Control Centre of their decision.

The Cooma Fire Control Centre then provided the crew with the location of a fire in Good Good, about 58 km (36 mi) to the east of Adaminaby. The Fire Control Centre requested the B134 crew look for targets of opportunity in the interest of protecting structures and property near Peak View. At around 12:59 pm, the B134 crew informed air traffic control of their new coordinates at the Good Good Fire-ground. At around 1:07 pm, the aircraft arrived at the drop area and after completing two orbits of the drop area, the B134 crew advised the Fire Control Centre that they were prepared to go ahead with the drop. At 1:15:15 pm, the crew completed a partial retardant drop at around 190 feet (58 m) AGL releasing about 1,200 U.S. gallons (4,500 L) of fire retardant. The aircraft then began climbing to around 330 feet (100 m) AGL where it began to rock from around an 18º left angle of bank to then a 6º right angle of bank. At 1:15:32 pm, the aircraft started descending to a very low height above the ground with a left roll. At around 1:15:37 pm, the aircraft collided with the ground and a post-impact fuel-fed fire ensued. All three crew were fatally injured and the aircraft was destroyed. No distress calls were received by air traffic control prior to the impact.

== Victims ==
All three victims were US residents who were working in Australia to assist during the black summer bushfires.

Ian McBeth (45), the pilot-in-command, lived in Montana and served as a pilot in the United States Wyoming Air National Guard and Montana Air National Guard working in the area of aerial firefighting from 1994 to 2014. McBeth, who was flying his final shift at the time of the accident, worked for Coulson Aviation since 2014. McBeth had a total flying experience of 4,010 hours, 3,010 of which were in the C-130 aircraft. He had also completed 994 air tanker drops over his career.

Paul Hudson (42), the copilot, served in the US Marine Corps for 20 years before his retirement as lieutenant colonel in 2019. Hudson, who joined Coulson Aviation in September 2019, had a total flying experience of 1,744 hours, of which about 1,364 hours were on the C-130 aircraft. It was Hudson's first fire season, when he flew to Australia on 1 December 2019 and in that time had flown around 85 hours.

Rick DeMorgan (43), the flight engineer, served in the US Air Force for 24 years and completed thirteen deployments to Iraq and Afghanistan. DeMorgan, who joined Coulson Aviation in November 2019 and was flying his first fire season, had experience of 4,050 hours on the C-130 aircraft as a flight engineer.

== Investigation ==
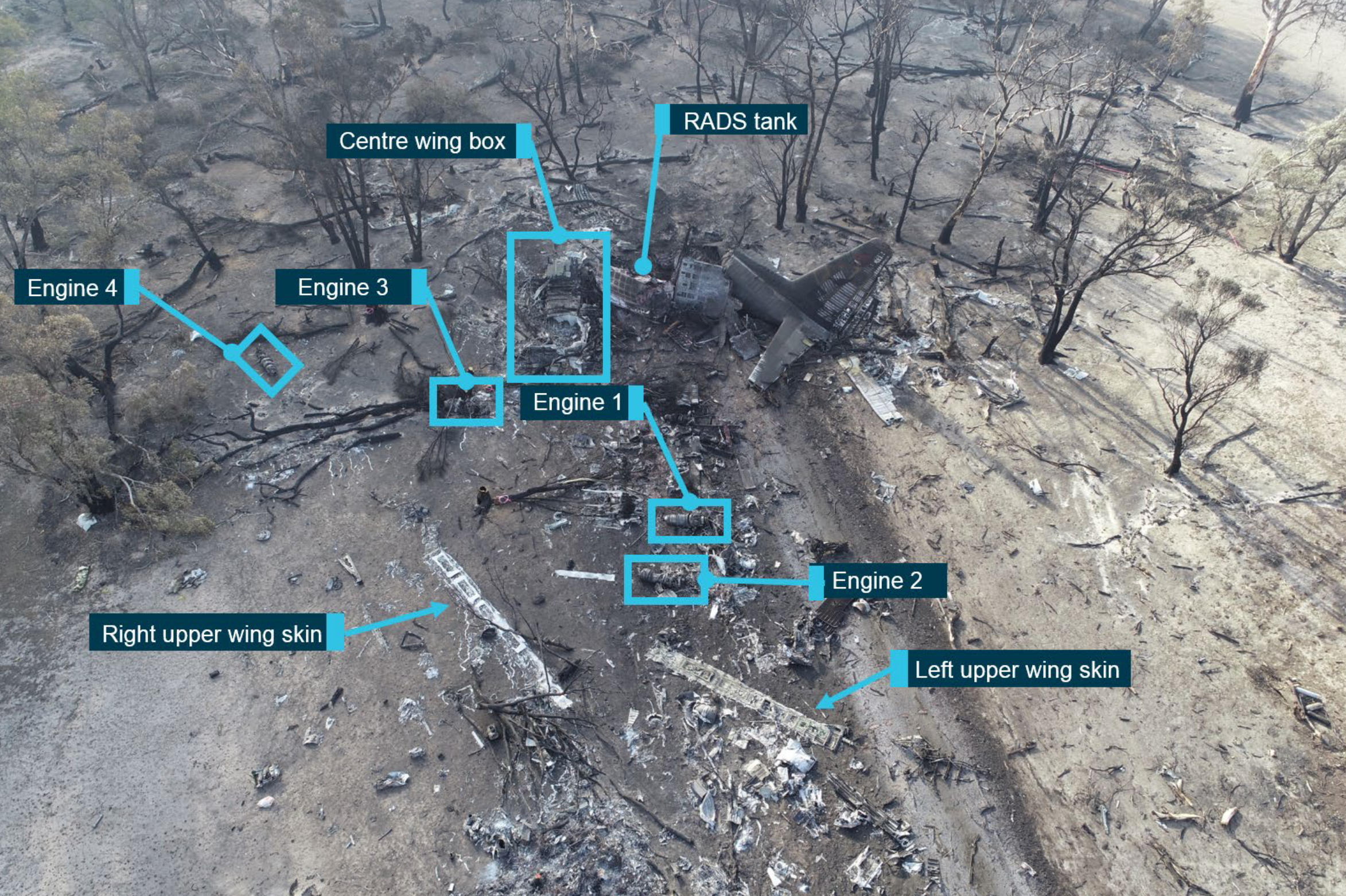
Main wreckage of the aircraft

The ATSB investigation's final report detailing the occurrence, findings, and safety recommendations was released on 29 August 2022.

The accident site was located near Peak View, New South Wales, with the debris trail distributed linearly over around 180 m of terrain. The on-site examination found that the aircraft collided with a tree before colliding with the ground. An intense post-impact fuel-fed fire destroyed the aircraft. There was no evidence of pre-impact structural damage.

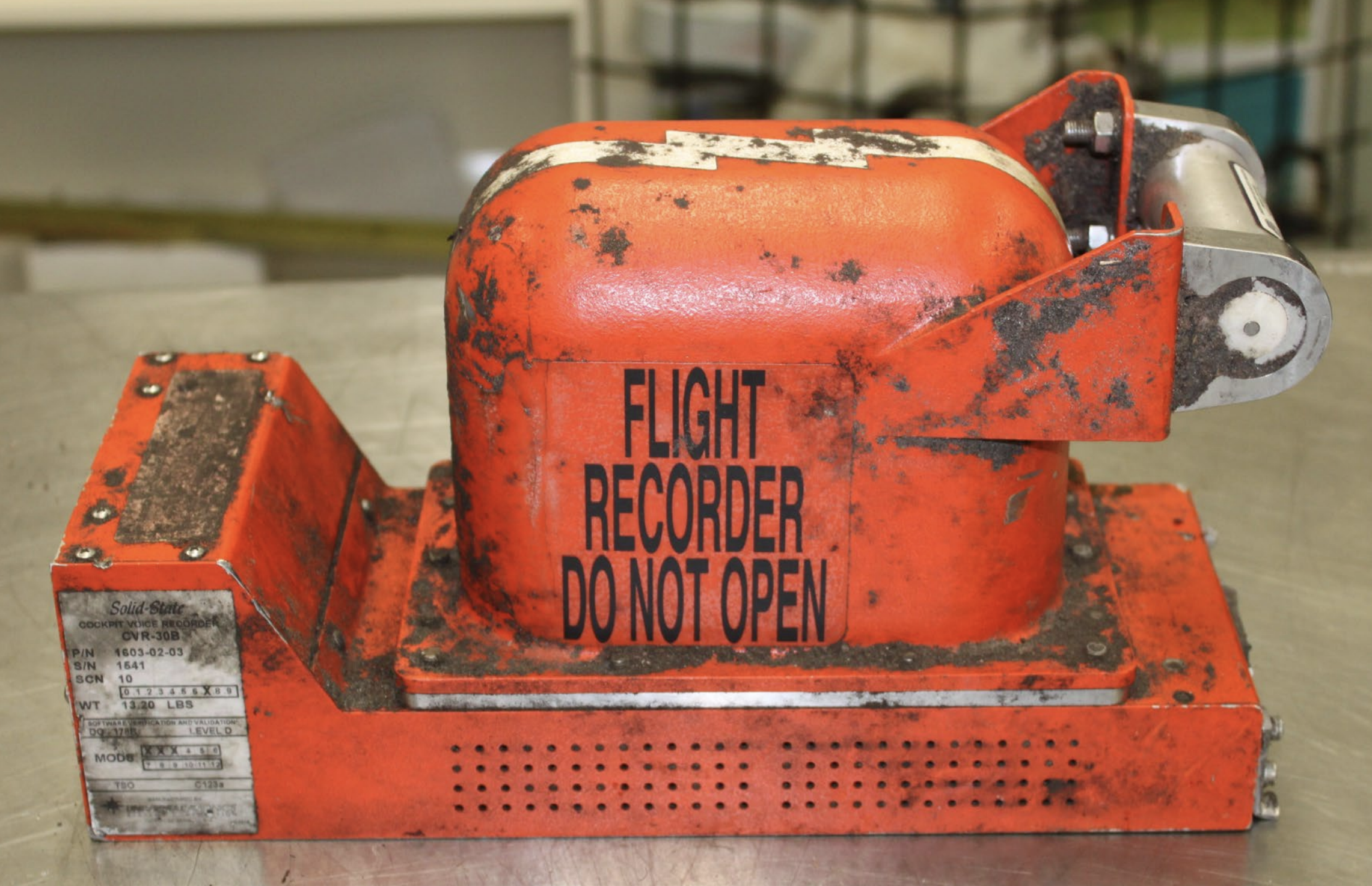
Cockpit voice recorder recovered from the aircraft's wreckage

The aircraft's cockpit voice recorder did not record the accident flight, when the data was downloaded, the ATSB found thirty-one minutes of audio data from a flight in the previous year. It was likely that an inertial switch in the unit was activated during a previous landing of the aircraft and consequently disconnected power to the device.

=== Cause ===
The ATSB's investigation identified the following to be factors contributing to the aircraft's collision:

- Hazardous weather conditions, including strong gusting winds and mountain wave activity, produced turbulence which was also exacerbated by the fire and local terrain.
- The NSW RFS continued with the exercise despite no other aircraft continuing to operate due to the weather conditions. In addition, the NSW RFS relied on the pilot-in-command to assess the viability of the task without providing them with all the available information to make an informed decision on flight safety.
- Once the aircraft's crew concluded that a fire retardant drop was too unsafe at the Adaminaby Fire-ground due to poor weather conditions, they proceeded to the Good Good Fire-ground which was subject to similar weather conditions, in line with their company's policy.
- Following the partial retardant drop and left turn, the aircraft was very likely subjected to low-level wind shear and an increased tailwind, which would have decreased the aircraft's climb performance. While at a low height and airspeed, it was likely the aircraft stalled, leading to a collision with terrain.

The ATSB's investigation also identified the following to be factors that increased risk levels associated with the flight:

- The aircraft's crew were, very likely, unaware that the observation aircraft had ceased operations in the area, due to the hazardous environmental conditions.
- Due to the limited reaction time available to the crew, the remainder of the fire-retardant load was not dumped prior to the aircraft stalling.

=== Findings and recommendations ===
The ATSB highlighted a number of safety issues and issued a number of recommendations in its final report. The ATSB found that:

- The NSW RFS did not have a policy or procedures in place to manage when pilots rejects a task, nor to communicate this information internally, or to other pilots that are working in the same area and recommended that the NSW RFS establish such policy.
- The NSW RFS had limited policies and procedures outlining the aerial supervision requirements for large air tankers and no procedures for deployment without aerial supervision and recommended the NSW RFS establish such policy.
- The NSW RFS procedures allowed aircraft operators to determine when their pilots were initial attack capable. However, they intended for the pilot in command to be certified under the US Forest Service certification process.
- Coulson Aviation's risk management processes did not adequately manage the risks associated with large air tanker operations. There were no operational risk assessments conducted or a risk register maintained. Further, safety incident reports were mainly for maintenance issues, or operational risks, and were less likely to be considered or monitored. Overall, this limited their ability to identify and implement policy to reduce the risks associated with their aerial firefighting operations.
- Coulson Aviation did not include a wind shear recovery procedure or scenario in their C-130 Flight Manual and annual simulator training to ensure that crews consistently and correctly responded to a wind shear encounter with minimal delay. Coulson Aviation has since amended its manuals and simulator training to include wind shear recovery procedures.
- Coulson Aviation fleet of C-130 aircraft were not fitted with a wind shear detection system, which increased the risk of a wind shear encounter and/or delayed response to a wind shear encounter during low-level operations. Coulson Aviation responded by stating that "unless evidence that Predictive wind shear Detection equipment would provide detection in an extremely dry atmosphere (found around fires)... any discussion regarding Predictive wind shear Detection equipment for these types of operations, is irrelevant." The ATSB acknowledged that predictive wind shear warning systems may have a reduced effectiveness in drier environments. However, they also stated that on the day of the accident, the wind shear system on the B137 activated when operating in similar environmental conditions to what was very likely experienced by the N134CG crew. The ATSB recommended that Coulson Aviation further consider the fitment of a wind shear detection system to their C-130 aircraft to minimise the time taken for crews to recognise and respond to an encounter particularly when operating at low-level and low speed.
- Coulson Aviation did not provide a pre-flight risk assessment for their fire-fighting large air tanker crews that would have provided predefined criteria to ensure consistent and objective decision-making with accepting or rejecting tasks, including factors relating to crew, environment, aircraft and external pressures. The ATSB recommended that Coulson Aviation incorporate foreseeable external factors into their pre-flight assessment tool to ensure the overall risk profile of a tasking can be consistently assessed by crews.

== Aftermath ==
Following the aircraft accident and the ATSB investigation, Coulson Aviation have incorporated a windshear recovery procedure into their C-130 Airplane Flight Manuals and simulator-based, recurrent windshear training. They have also implemented a pre-flight risk assessment to be completed by the pilot in command prior to the first tasking of the day. They will also be introducing a three-tier risk management approach, of organisational risk, operational risk, and tactical/mission risk, to be utilised during the upcoming fire season in Australia. Further, Coulson Aviation have updated their pre-flight procedures to incorporate a cockpit voice recorder system check before each flight.

The NSW RFS, in response to the accident, have commissioned an independent report into the management of airspace in which aircraft are operating in support of fire-fighting activities, formalised and establish a 'Large Air Tanker Co-ordinator' role description, to be positioned on the State Air Desk during heightened fire activity, and have undertaken an audit, in conjunction with operators, of pilots qualified as initial attack capable and ensure appropriate records are accessible by RFS personnel. Further, they have undertaken detailed research to identify best practice (nationally and internationally) relating to task rejection and aerial supervision policies and procedures as well as initial attack training and certification. They have also undertaken a comprehensive review of NSW RFS aviation doctrine to incorporate lessons from this incident into their existing policies and procedures.

Following the death of pilot-in-command, Ian McBeth, his family established a foundation called the Ian McBeth Foundation. It supports the Montana National Guard, the Wyoming National Guard, and the Wray, Colorado, community, which were important organisations to McBeth.

== In popular culture ==
The accident was featured in season 25 of the Canadian documentary series Mayday, titled "Firebomber Down".

== See also ==
- List of accidents and incidents involving the Lockheed C-130 Hercules
- 2023 Coulson Aviation Crash

== Sources ==
- Collision with terrain involving Lockheed Martin EC-130Q, N134CG (PDF) (Report). Australian Transport Safety Bureau. 29 August 2022. Archived (PDF) from the original on 3 January 2024.

This article incorporates text from a free content work. Licensed under Creative Commons Attribution 4.0 International Licence (license statement/permission). Text taken from Collision with terrain involving Lockheed EC130Q, N134CG, 50 km north-east of Cooma-Snowy Mountains Airport (near Peak View), New South Wales, on 23 January 2020, Australian Transport Safety Bureau.
