= Coulson Aviation =

Aviation company based in Canada

IATA	ICAO	Call sign
—	CUL	COULSON
- Founded: 1960
- Commenced operations: Mid 1980s
- Parent company: Coulson Group
- Headquarters: Port Alberni, British Columbia, Canada
- Key people: Wayne Coulson (CEO), Britton Coulson (president & COO)
- Founder: Cliff Coulson
- Employees: Over 650
- Website: coulsonaviation.com

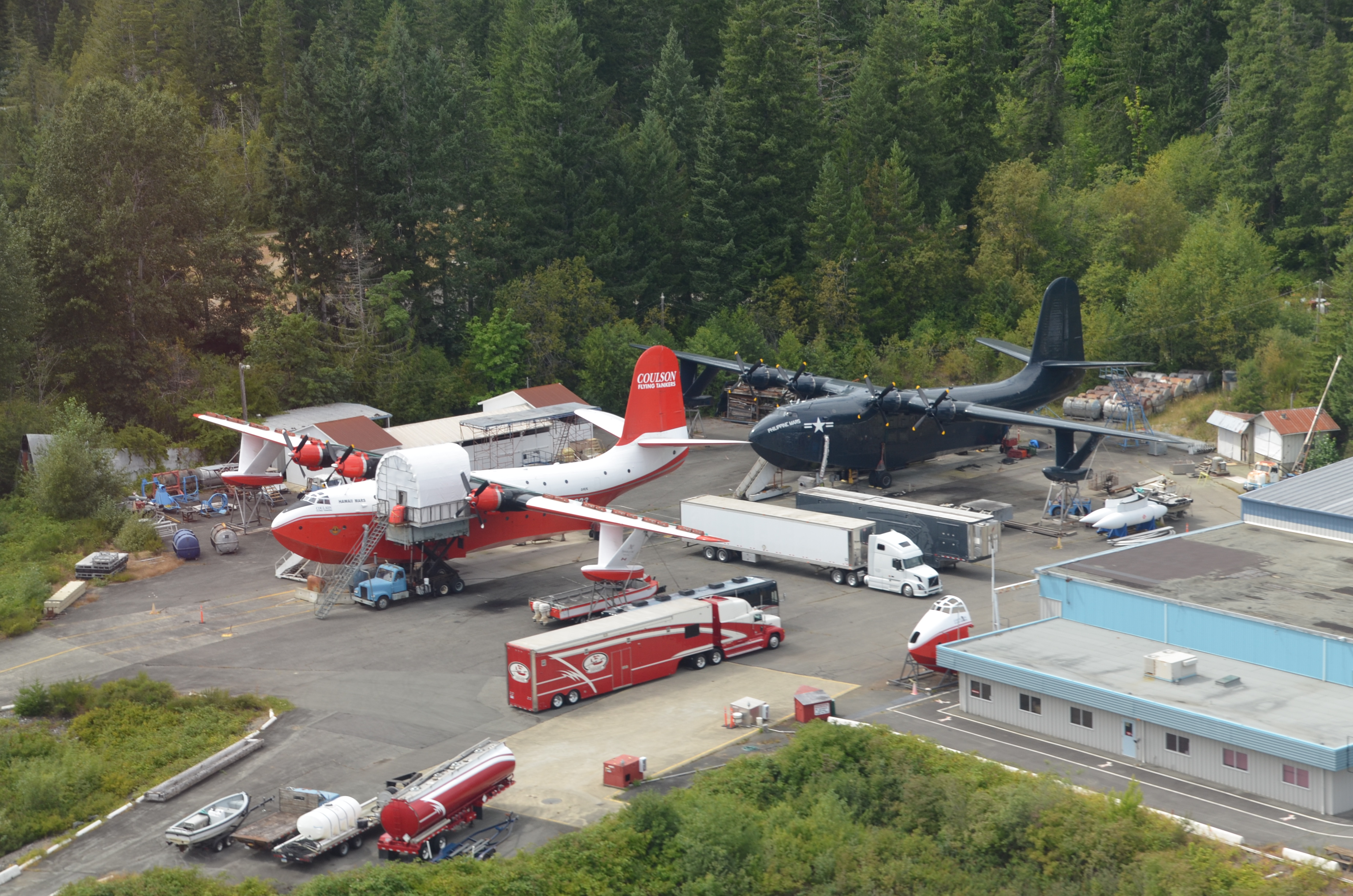
Coulson Aviation base on Sproat Lake, with 2 Martin Mars seen in the picture

Coulson Aviation is an aviation company headquartered in Port Alberni, British Columbia, Canada. The company's fleet specializes in air tankers used for aerial firefighting. It operates in Canada, the United States, Australia and Chile.

The company operates both fixed-wing and rotary-wing aircraft. The company's operations included helicopter logging, wildfire suppression, power-line construction, airliner passenger, transport, and other industrial heavy lift operations. Coulson Aviation (USA) Inc. is a subsidiary of Coulson Aircrane Ltd. Currently, Coulson Aviation contracts rotary and fixed-wing aircraft to Australia and the US from Canada.

== History ==
=== Aerial firefighting ===
In 1987, the company acquired its first helicopter, a Sikorsky S-61N. This helicopter was primarily used for logging support until 1995. During a dry summer, the company began its shift to aerial firefighting operations. Throughout the expansion, Coulson Aviation sold their timberlands and sawmills to focus more funds to firefighting efforts.

By 2007, the company had purchased multiple planes, including the Martin JRM Mars flying boat. Coulson Aviation was awarded a contract with the U.S. Forest Service the same year.

Coulson Aviation signed a 5 year lease in March 2022 for Thermal Airport in Southern California. Three C-130s, three Boeing 737s, five CH-47 Chinook helicopters, three S-61 helicopters, and S-70 Blackhawks are reportedly being stationed there for supporting the California fire response efforts.

In December 2025, Coulson Aviation announced their intent to develop a Boeing 767 Very Large Air Tanker (VLAT) aircraft. The 767 VLAT plans to be capable of both personnel transport and aerial firefighting configurations.

=== Asia-Pacific operations ===
In 2005, Coulson was contracted to provide aerial fire suppression support to Australia's National Aerial Firefighting Centre and the state of Victoria. Coulson Aviation Australia was founded in 2010 to support Coulson Aircrane's long-term operations in the country.

Coulson began expanding to more countries in the early 2020s. Coulson Aviation was offered its first Asian contract in 2020 by the Indonesian National Board for Disaster Management. After a 2015 deployment, the National Board offered a contract to Coulson Aviation.

The South Korean Fire Service announced a competition to supply aerial firefighting helicopters in 2022. Coulson, Erickson, and Columbia Helicopters were all considered qualified to bid. According to a filed lawsuit by Coulson, Columbia and Coulson made a deal to use Coulson's water tanks in any helicopter proposal, with Coulson stepping down from the main competition. However, Coulson claimed in the lawsuit that Columbia violated the deal and installed a competitor's water tanks.

== Products ==
=== Boeing 737 FireLiner ===
The Coulson FireLiner are a series of Boeing 737 airliners which have been modified by Coulson Aviation into specialized air tankers. The FireLiner can drop up to 4,000 US gallons (15,000 L; 3,300 imp gal) of fire retardant, while being able to carry up to 72 passengers without reconfiguration.

=== Boeing 767 Very Large Air Tanker program ===
In December 2025, Coulson Aviation announced the start of its Boeing 767 Very Large Air Tanker (VLAT) program. The 767 VLAT program is meant to serve as a replacement for legacy MD-11 and DC-10 VLATs. The 767 VLAT will feature Coulson's Retardant Aerial Delivery System, while being able to carry up to 160 passengers.

=== Retardant Aerial Delivery Systems (RADS) ===
Coulson Aviation's Retardant Aerial Delivery System (RADS) is an advanced tanking system for aerial firefighting aircraft. RADS can be installed on three aircraft, the CH-47 Chinhook, C-130 Hercules, and Coulson Aviation-Boeing 737 FireLiner. RADS' control system allows operators to adjust the flow rate, allowing for more accurate drops. Depending on the variant, RADS can carry up to 4,000 U.S. gallons of fire retardant. RADS has three variants:

Variant	Capacity	Flow rate	Aircraft
RADS-L	3,000 US gallons (11,000 L; 2,500 imp gal)	1,600 US gallons (6,100 L; 1,300 imp gal) per second	CH-47 Chinook
RADS-XXL	4,000 US gallons (15,000 L; 3,300 imp gal)	1,600 US gallons (6,100 L; 1,300 imp gal) per second	C-130 Hercules, 737 FireLiner
RADS-XXL/20	4,000 US gallons (15,000 L; 3,300 imp gal)	1,600 US gallons (6,100 L; 1,300 imp gal) per second	737 FireLiner

== Fleet ==
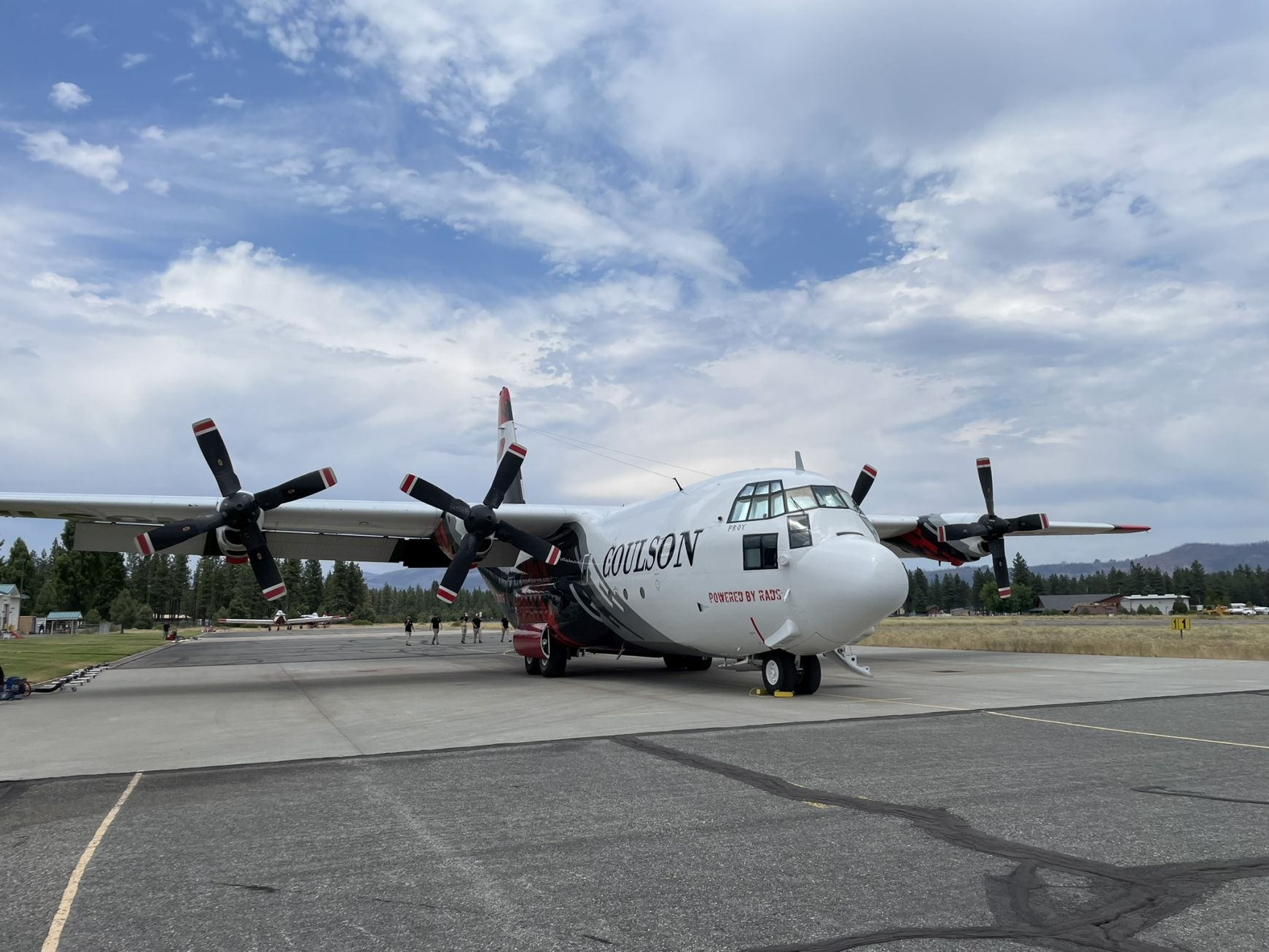
Tanker 133 at Rogers Field, Chester CA

Air tankers
Aircraft	Number (Note: As of 10 September 2025)	Variants	Notes	Ref(s)
Coulson Aviation-Boeing 737 FireLiner	4	3 - Boeing 737-300; 1 - Boeing 737-700		
C-130 Hercules	20	10 - CC-130H 1 - EC-130Q 5 - C-130H 4 - C-130H(NZ)		

Command and control aircraft
Aircraft	Number	Variants	Notes	Ref(s)
Cessna Citation 550 II	11			
Cessna Citation 560 V	3			

Rotary wing aircraft
Aircraft	Number	Variants	Notes	Ref(s)
CH-47 Chinhook	5	5 - CH-47D		
UH-60 Blackhawk	3			
Sikorsky S-61	3			
Sikorsky S-76	2			
Bell 412EP	6			

== Accidents and incidents ==
Coulson Aviation aircraft have been involved in two accidents.

- In 2020, a Coulson Lockheed C-130 Hercules aircraft crashed while aerial firefighting for the New South Wales Rural Fire Service during Australia's black summer bushfires, resulting in the deaths of three American firefighters. The Australian Transport Safety Bureau (ATSB) determined the cause of the collision was likely due to the dangerous weather conditions, low-level wind shear and an increased tailwind, leading to the aircraft stalling while releasing fire retardant foam at a low height and airspeed and colliding with terrain.
- In 2023, a Boeing 737-300 aircraft known as Tanker 139 and operated by Coulson Aviation crashed in the Fitzgerald River National Park in the Great Southern Region of Western Australia while fighting multiple fires. The cause of the crash was the pilots dumping fire retardant below the minimum altitude.
