= Coulson 737 Fireliner =

Aerial firefighting aircraft

Coulson Fireliner
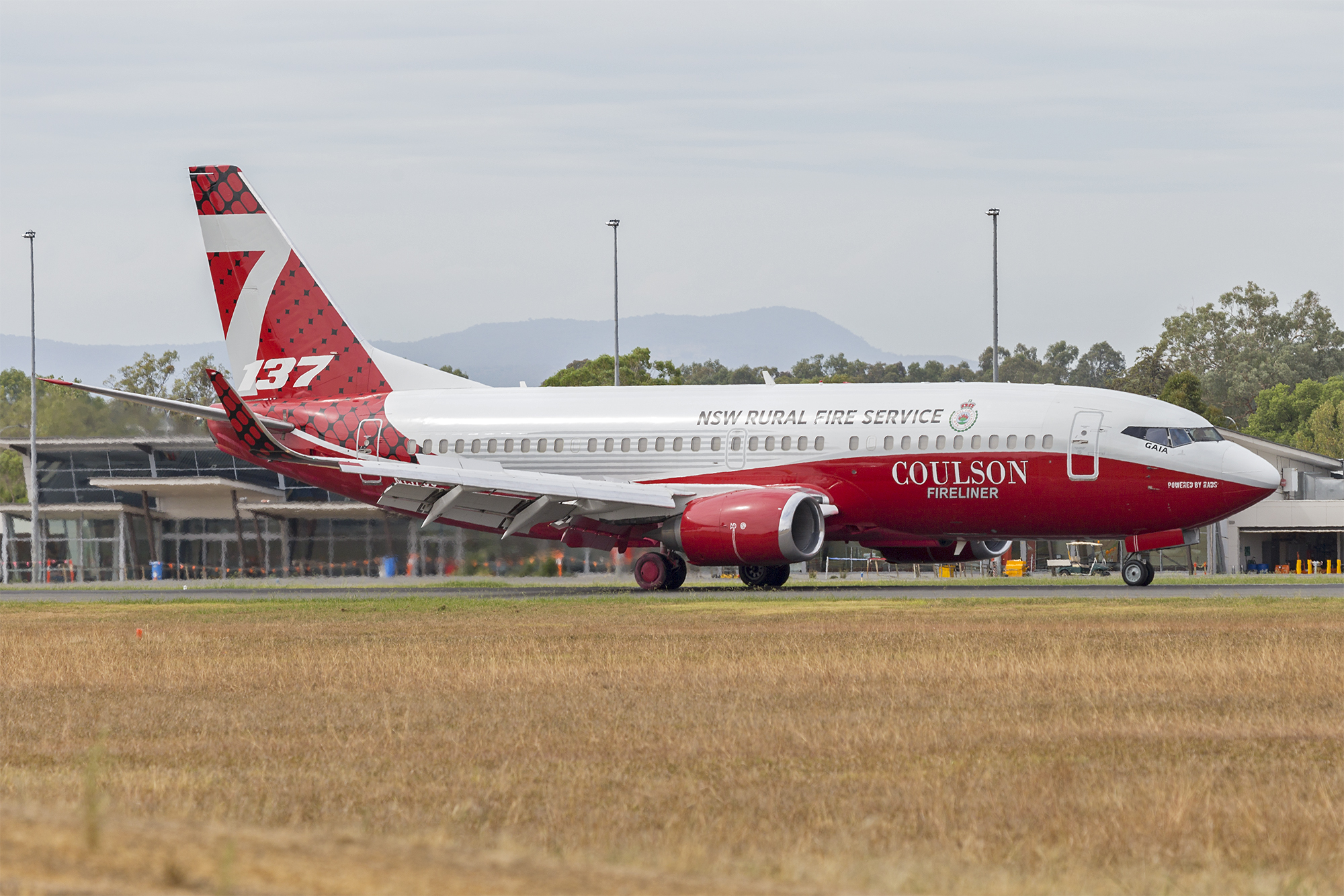
- A Coulson Aviation 737 FireLiner at Albury Airport in March 2019.

General information
- Role: Air tanker
- National origin: Canada
- Manufacturer: Coulson Aviation
- Status: In service
- Primary user: Coulson Aviation
- Number built: 6

History
- Developed from: Boeing 737-300, Boeing 737-700

The Coulson Fireliner is a Boeing 737 airliner that has been modified by Coulson Aviation to become a specialized aerial firefighting air tanker.

== History ==
In May 2017, Coulson Aviation announced the Fireliner program and acquisition of six ex-Southwest Airlines Boeing 737-300s to be converted. The company previously had been using helicopters and three Lockheed C-130s customized for use as air tankers, but obtaining more C-130s for civilian use was difficult.

On July 14, 2018, Coulson Aviation performed the water first drops with the Fireliner.

On November 23, 2018, the Fireliner was used operationally for the first time.

On May 23, 2024, Coulson Aviation announced a next-generation Fireliner program, acquiring their first Boeing 737-700 aircraft. Coulson plans to have a fleet of up to ten Boeing 737-700s.

== Design ==
The Fireliner is equipped with Coulson Aviation's Retardant Aerial Delivery System (RADS-XXL). The Fireliner can drop up to 4,000 US gallons (15,000 L) of fire retardant with a flow rate of 1,600 US gallons (6,100 L) per second. This is the same carrying capacity as the company's C-130 tankers and exceeds the 3,000 US gallons (11,000 L) carrying capacity of the company's CH-47 Chinook helicopters. While fully loaded with retardant, the Fireliner can also transport up to 72 firefighters without reconfiguration and fly at maximum rated speeds and with unrestricted altitudes.

=== Conversion process ===
Converting a 737 into a Fireliner requires 43,000 man hours to complete the conversion. The process includes the installation of the RADS-XXL, avionics upgrades, new interior with seats for 72 passengers, and a full repaint.

== Operators ==
Operator	In service	On order	Notes
Coulson Aviation	4	9	
Government of Santiago del Estero	1	-	

== Accidents ==
On February 6, 2023, a Boeing 737-300 Fireliner owned by Coulson Aviation and used as an air tanker crashed in the Fitzgerald River National Park in the Great Southern Region of Western Australia while fighting multiple fires. The two crew members aboard—both pilots—survived with minor injuries and were taken to the hospital. The aircraft was destroyed, and resulted in the first hull loss of a Boeing 737 in Australia.
