= Inertial switch =

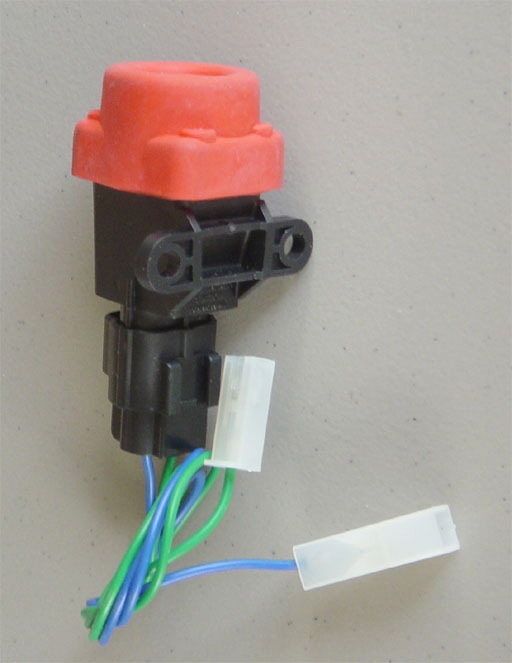
- A disconnect switch.
- Component type: Switch

Electronic symbol

An inertial switch is a switch, firmly mounted upon a vehicle or other mobile device, that triggers in the event of shock or vibration. It is a part of electrical circuits that may either enable or disable some function.

== Disconnect ==
The switch shown to the right is intended to disable an electric fuel pump in automotive applications. This functionality is required in some vehicle racing applications, since an electric fuel pump may otherwise continue operating after a collision or rollover. If the fuel line is broken or the vehicle is inverted, fuel may be spilled, creating a fire hazard. A small loose weight (called a proof mass) is trapped within a spring-loaded cage. A shock in any direction will cause movement of the mass relative to the cage. If sufficiently shocked, the cage will spring open which actuates an associated switch. The switch is reset by pressing the cage closed through the flexible (red) top cover, retrapping the mass. These switches are also used to open a contactor (a large relay) to disable the high power circuit of a battery electric vehicle upon collision.

== Actuation ==
A normally open switch is used to activate passenger safety equipment early in a collision, typically to pre-tension seat belts and/or to activate airbags to protect the occupant(s) from collision with the vehicle interior or the steering wheel.

Inertia switches are also used in ordnance applications for both safety (shell will not explode until it has been subjected to launch acceleration) and fuzing.
