= Agia, Cyprus =

Agia: Αγιά (Greek); Dilekkaya (Turkish)
- Location within Cyprus
- Coordinates: 35°06′31″N 33°33′48″E
- Country (de jure): Cyprus
  - District: Nicosia District
- Country (de facto): Northern Cyprus
  - District: Lefkoşa District

Population (2011)
  - Total: 619

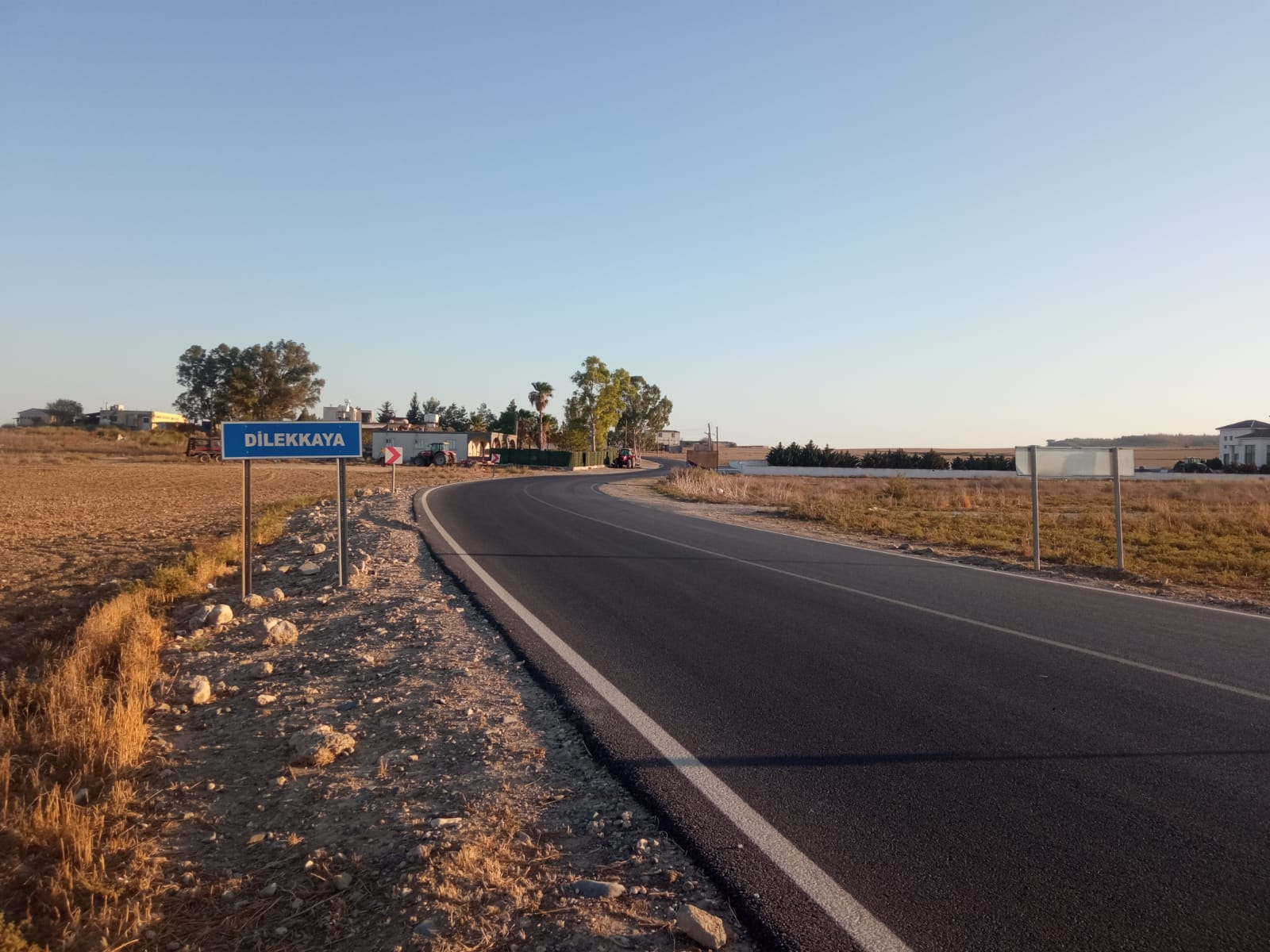

Agia (Greek: Αγιά; Turkish: Dilekkaya or Agakebir) is a village in the Nicosia District of Cyprus, east of Tymvou and Ercan International Airport. It is under the de facto control of Northern Cyprus. The village was almost exclusively inhabited by Turkish Cypriots even before 1974. As of 2011, it had a population of 619.
