= Tymbou =

Tymbou: Τύμβου, Τύμπου (Greek); Kırklar (Turkish)
- Location within Cyprus
- Coordinates: 35°08′05″N 33°31′44″E
- Country (de jure): Cyprus
  - District: Nicosia District
- Country (de facto): Northern Cyprus
  - District: Lefkoşa District

Population (2011)
  - Total: 384

Tymbou (Greek: Τύμβου or Τύμπου; Turkish: Kırklar) is a village in the central Mesaoria plain of Cyprus. Tymbou belongs to the Turkish Armed Forces and is under the control of Northern Cyprus. After 1960, the village was inhabited exclusively by Greek Cypriots; in 1973, they numbered 1,288. The original population fled the village in 1974, following the Turkish Invasion of Cyprus. As of 2011, Tymbou had a population of 384.

Ercan International Airport is located directly north of the village.

== Location ==
Tymbou is located 17 km (11 mi) to the east of Nicosia, off the old Nicosia – Famagusta road. It lies in the Mesaoria plain, next to Yialias river, at an altitude of 110 m (360 ft). To the south of the village lie the now-uninhabited villages of Margo and Pyrogi, while Louroujina, 15 km (9.3 mi) south of Tymbou, is still inhabited by Turkish Cypriots.

== Nearby airport ==
Tymbou Airport, the precursor of Ercan International Airport, was constructed by the British in World War II as a military airport, during their colonial rule of the island. It was abandoned after the independence of Cyprus. Following the Turkish invasion, it was expanded and today it is used as the main civilian airport of Northern Cyprus.

== History ==
The name Tymbou is believed to come from the tombs (Greek τύμβος) located in caves and caverns to the north of the present village near the airport. First written records of the name Tymbou can be found on a document from the Frankish (Lusignian) occupation of the island during the reign of the Frankish king Jacob II (1460-1473 AD). The document granted feudal rights of the area to Pierre Coul.

During the Ottoman period it was a large çiflik (farming area which included the entire village) belonging to wealthy Greek landowner in 1813 named Demetris Pavlides. From 1821 it became the property of a local Turkish administrator Halil Shindar (?). After the end of Turkish rule it returned to Greek hands.

The Greek population of the village grew from 278 in 1881 to 1133 in 1960 and 1288 in 1973.

The village church dedicated to Ayios Yeorgios (Saint George) was built in 1875. However some of the icons in the church date back to the 17th and 18th centuries.

A cave - turned church near the village dedicated to the Forty Martyrs (Σαράνατα Μάρτυρες) was later turned into a mosque named Kirklar, the name used by the occupying power for the village of Tymbou.
