= Van Ferit Melen Airport =

Airport in eastern Turkey

Van Ferit Melen Airport Van Ferit Melen Havalimanı
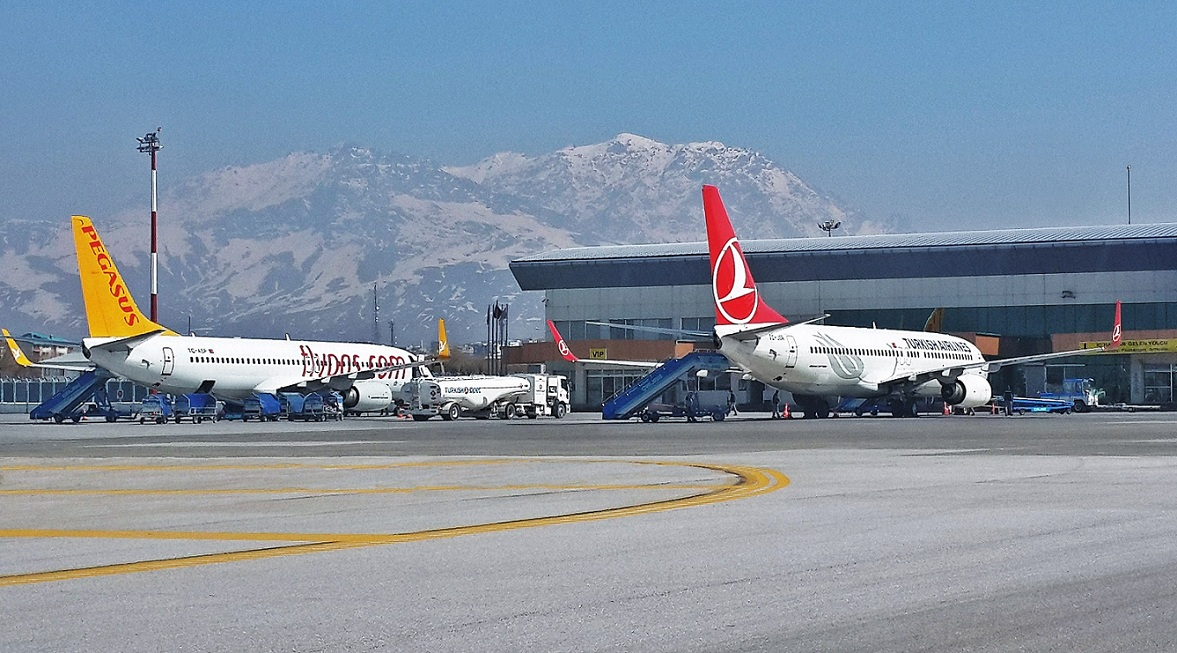
- IATA: VAN; ICAO: LTCI

Summary
- Airport type: Public
- Operator: General Directorate of State Airports Authority
- Serves: Van, Turkey
- Location: Edremit, Van, Turkey
- Opened: 1943; 83 years ago
- Elevation AMSL: 5,480 ft / 1,670 m
- Coordinates: 38°28′06″N 43°19′56″E
- Website: www.dhmi.gov.tr

Map
- Location of airport in Turkey VAN (Asia)

Runways
Direction	Length		Surface
Direction	m	ft	Surface
03/21	2,750	9,022	Asphalt

Statistics (2025)
- Annual passenger capacity: 2,500,000
- Passengers: 1,164,400
- Passenger change 2024–25: ▼29%
- Aircraft movements: 12,643
- Movements change 2024–25: ▼36%

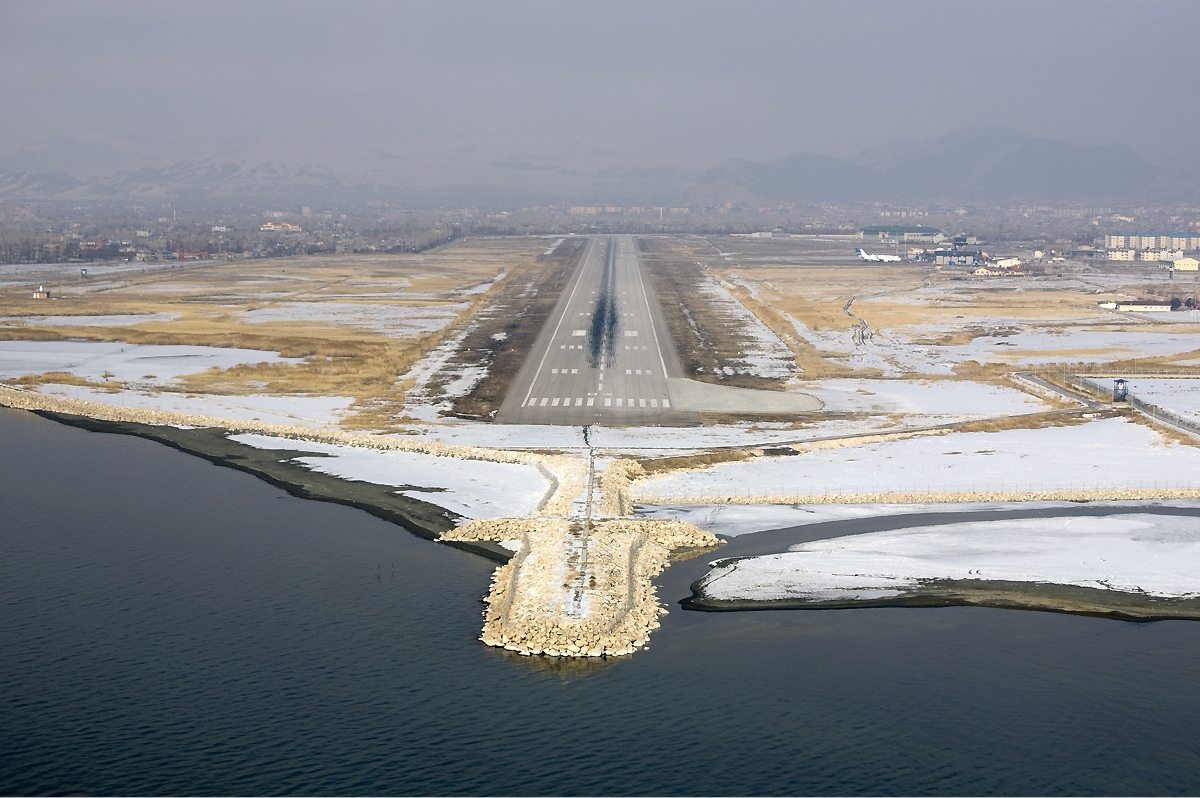
Aerial view of the airport

Van Ferit Melen Airport (IATA: VAN, ICAO: LTCI) is an airport in Van, a city in the eastern region of Turkey. It is named after the Turkish politician and former prime minister Ferit Melen (1906–1988).

== Airlines and destinations ==
The following airlines operate regular scheduled and charter flights at Van Airport:

Airlines	Destinations
AJet	Ankara, Istanbul–Sabiha Gökçen, Trabzon
Pegasus Airlines	Adana/Mersin, Antalya, Istanbul–Sabiha Gökçen
SunExpress	Adana/Mersin, Antalya, Izmir
Turkish Airlines	Istanbul

== Traffic Statistics ==
Van–Ferit Melen Airport Passenger Traffic Statistics
Year (months)	Domestic	% change	International	% change	Total	% change
2025	1,157,856	▼29%	6,544	▲21%	1,164,400	▼29%
2024	1,623,142	▲5%	5,428	▲77%	1,628,570	▲5%
2023	1,546,609	▲18%	3,062	▲65%	1,549,671	▲18%
2022	1,309,157	▲3%	1,857	-	1,311,014	▲4%
2021	1,265,467	▲30%	-	▼100%	1,265,467	▲30%
2020	974,550	▼31%	1,761	▼76%	976,311	▼31%
2019	1,406,099	▼9%	7,268	▲93%	1,413,367	▼9%
2018	1,544,074	▼7%	3,764	▲3%	1,547,838	▼7%
2017	1,657,864	▲12%	3,671	▼16%	1,661,535	▲12%
2016	1,477,518	▲7%	4,355	▲13%	1,481,873	▲7%
2015	1,382,455	▲15%	3,866	▲28%	1,386,321	▲15%
2014	1,204,114	▲7%	3,031	▼28%	1,207,145	▲7%
2013	1,120,522	▲12%	4,218	▲99%	1,124,740	▲12%
2012	999,223	▼5%	2,121	▲20%	1,001,344	▼5%
2011	1,055,358	▲19%	1,774	▲6%	1,057,132	▲19%
2010	890,376	▲20%	1,674	▲60%	892,050	▲20%
2009	744,447	▲28%	1,046	▼75%	745,493	▲27%
2008	581,142	▲6%	4,177	▲34%	585,319	▲7%
2007	546,413	Steady	3,108	Steady	549,521	Steady

== Incidents and accidents ==
- On 29 December 1994, Turkish Airlines Flight 278 crashed on approach to the airport, killing 57 of the 76 people on board.
