= List of uninhabited villages in Northern Cyprus =

This is a list of cities, town and villages in Northern Cyprus which are uninhabited. The list first lists the Turkish name followed by the English name.

== Lefkoşa (Nicosia) ==
- Çömlekçi - Chumlchuk
- Gaziler - Pyrogi
- İkidere - Dyo Potamoi
- Margo - Margo

Total: 4

== Gazimağusa (Famagusta) ==
- Akyar - Strovilia
- Arıdamı - Artemi
- Düzce - Achna
- Ekmekçiler - Ornithi
- Yukarı Derinya - Upper Deryneia

Total: 5

== Lefke (Lefka) ==
- Erenköy - Kokkina
- Günebakan - Amadies
- Madenliköy - Agios Georgios Solea
- Ömerli - Galini
- Taşköy - Petra

Total: 5

== See also ==
- List of populated places in Northern Cyprus
- Districts of Northern Cyprus
- List of cities, towns and villages in Cyprus
- Districts of Cyprus
