= Kargılı, Tarsus =

Kargılı
- Neighbourhood
- Location in Turkey
- Coordinates: 36°56′N 35°04′E
- Country: Turkey
- Province: Mersin
- District: Tarsus
- Elevation: 20 m (66 ft)
- Population (2022): 685
- Time zone: UTC+3 (TRT)
- Area code: 0324

Kargılı is a neighbourhood in the municipality and district of Tarsus, Mersin Province, Turkey. Its population is 685 (2022). It is situated in Çukurova (Cilicia of the antiquity) to the east of Tarsus and to the south of Turkish state highway D.400. Its distance to Tarsus is 20 kilometres (12 mi) and its distance to Mersin is 47 kilometres (29 mi). The new airport of the region, namely Çukurova Airport is planned to be constructed between Çiçekli and Kargılı.
