= Salient (military) =

Battlefield front breakthrough progressing into enemy territory

German attack plan (blue arrows) to pinch out Red Army-controlled Kursk salient, which resulted in the Battle of Kursk

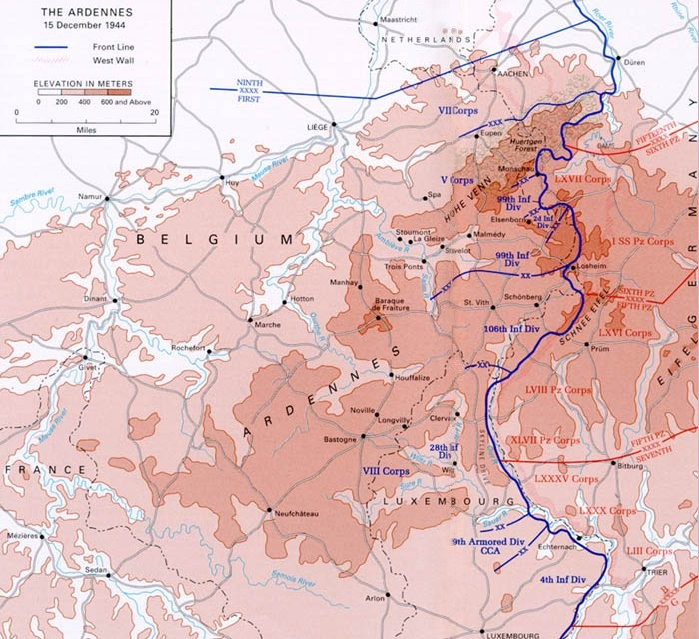
German-occupied salient in the Ardennes on the eve of the Battle of the Bulge on December 15, 1944

A salient, also known as a bulge, is a battlefield feature that projects into enemy territory. The salient is surrounded by the enemy on multiple sides, making the troops occupying the salient vulnerable. The opponent's front line that borders a salient is referred to as a re-entrant – that is, an angle pointing inwards. A deep salient is vulnerable to being "pinched off" through the base, and this will result in a pocket in which the forces in the salient become isolated and without a supply line. On the other hand, a breakout of the forces within the salient through its tip can threaten the rear areas of the opposing forces outside it, leaving them open to an attack from behind.

== Implementation ==
Salients can be formed in a number of ways. An attacker can produce a salient in the defender's line by either intentionally making a pincer movement around the military flanks of a strongpoint, which becomes the tip of the salient, or by making a broad, frontal attack which is held up in the centre but advances on the flanks. An attacker would usually produce a salient in his own line by making a broad, frontal attack that is successful only in the center, which becomes the tip of the salient. A salient can also be formed if the attacking army feigns retreat, tricking the defending forces to chase them down, leading to the main army being on all sides in a pre-arranged ambush.

In trench warfare, salients are distinctly defined by the opposing lines of trenches, and they were commonly formed by the failure of a broad frontal attack. The static nature of the trenches meant that forming a pocket was difficult, but the vulnerable nature of salients meant that they were often the focus of attrition battles.

Map showing German forces pushing out through the tip of the salient in an attempt to penetrate into the rear of the Allied forces during the Battle of the Bulge, December 16–25, 1944. Front line, 16 December Front line, 20 December Front line, 25 December

=== Examples ===
- American Civil War
  - On the second day of the Battle of Gettysburg, Union General Daniel Sickles moved his III Corps ahead of the main line of the Union Army without orders, causing him to be nearly cut off from the main army when the Confederate Army attacked. Sickles had held a similar position at Catherine's Furnace in the Battle of Chancellorsville two months earlier, and in both cases his corps was badly mauled and had to be rescued by other units.
  - At the Battle of Spotsylvania, the Confederate Army of Northern Virginia arrived first at a strategic crossroads, and constructed a timber-reinforced line of trenches to stand against the numerically superior Union Army of the Potomac. The trench line bulged forward to protect a piece of high ground, in a curve that became known as the Mule Shoe Salient. Union troops concentrated their attack on this point, broke through, and 22 hours of brutal, hand-to-hand fighting ensued before the Confederates pulled back to a new position.
- World War I
  - The British occupied a large salient at Ypres for most of the war. Formed as a result of the First Battle of Ypres, it became one of the most bloody sectors of the Western Front. So enduring was the feature and so dreadful its reputation that when British infantry spoke of "The Salient", it was understood that they were referring to Ypres.
  - A similar salient existed around the French city of Verdun; the Battle of Verdun around it cost both sides heavy casualties.
  - The Germans occupied a small salient in front of Fromelles called the Sugarloaf due to its distinctive shape. Being small, it provided advantage to the occupiers by allowing them to enfilade the stretches of no man's land on either flank.
- World War II
  - The Soviet Union held a massive, 150 km deep salient at Kursk that became a target of a Nazi German pincer formation attack, becoming the site of the largest tank battle in history and a decisive battle on the Eastern Front.
  - The German Army launched a surprise attack against advancing Allied forces in the Ardennes (a region of extensive forests primarily in Belgium and Luxembourg) in December 1944. This battle created a large salient for several weeks, and is commonly known as the Battle of the Bulge (also known as the Ardennes Offensive and the Von Rundstedt Offensive).
- Turkish invasion of Cyprus
  - Turkish forces reached as far south as the Turkish Cypriot village of Louroujina. The cease-fire line dividing Cyprus into Greek and Turkish-controlled sectors put Louroujina in a salient — accessible from the rest of Turkish Cypriot-controlled Cyprus by a single road.
- Bangladesh Liberation War
  - The Battle of Boyra was fought by the Indian Army and the Mukti Bahini against the Pakistan Army, over the Boyra salient, overlooking an important supply route, the Jessore Road.

=== Pocket ===
In mobile warfare, such as the German Blitzkrieg, salients were more likely to be made into pockets which became the focus of annihilation battles.

A pocket carries connotations that the encircled forces have not allowed themselves to be encircled intentionally, as they may when defending a fortified position, which is usually called a siege. This is a similar distinction to that made between a skirmish and pitched battle.

== See also ==
- Panhandle
- Spur (mountain)
