= Louroujina =

Louroujina: Λουρουτζίνα (Greek); Akıncılar (Turkish)

- Location of Louroujina in Cyprus
- Coordinates: 35°00′33″N 33°27′53″E
- Country (de jure): Cyprus
  - District: Nicosia District
- Country (de facto): Northern Cyprus
  - District: Lefkoşa District

Government
  - Mayor: Hasan Barbaros

Population (2011)
  - Total: 390
- Website: Akincilar Turkish municipality The municipality in NC eGov portal

Louroujina (Greek: Λουρουτζίνα (or Λουρουκίνα) [locally [luɾuˈt͡ʃina]]; Turkish: Akıncılar, previously Lurucina or Luricina) is a village in Cyprus, located within the salient that marks the southernmost extent of North Cyprus. It was one of the largest mixed Cypriot villages before the Turkish invasion of Cyprus. In 1974, Louroujina was secured so as to be placed within a contiguous Turkish Cypriot zone, which is until now on the internationally unrecognized Northern Cyprus. The United Nations Buffer Zone separates the Louroujina salient from the area controlled by the Republic of Cyprus.

In 2017, following the expansion of Ercan International Airport, a new road has been built which bypasses the Kirklar military camp and for the first time since 1974 provides access to Louroujina without going through any army points.

== History ==
Prior to 1960, Louroujina's population was Turkish Cypriots and Greek Cypriots. The Turkish Cypriots constituted a majority. The Greek Cypriots, who numbered about 100, fled the village during the Emergency years. By 1973, 1,963 Turkish Cypriots were living in Louroujina. After the Turkish invasion, the majority were relocated in nearby villages; however, about 300 opted to stay, in contravention of the authorities' demand that they vacate the village. As of 2011, Louroujina had a population of 390.

According to legend, Louroujina is so named because it was founded by a woman named "Lorenziya". In 1958, it was renamed Akıncılar in Turkish, meaning "raiders". The new name is said to have been inspired by an inter-communal clash between Greek Cypriots and Louroujina Cypriots, who outnumbered the former, at Pyroi (Gaziler). In their flight, the Greek Cypriots shouted, "the Turkish Cypriots from Louroujina are flooding in" (in Turkish: Luricina'lılar akın akın geliyor).

== Sports ==
Turkish Cypriot Akıncılar Sports Club was founded in 1942. As of 2016, it competes in Cyprus Turkish Football Association (CTFA) K-PET 2nd League.
