= Geçitkale Sub-district =

Geçitkale Sub-district is a sub-district of Gazimağusa District, Northern Cyprus.
