= Pegasus Airlines Flight 8622 =

2018 aviation accident in Turkey

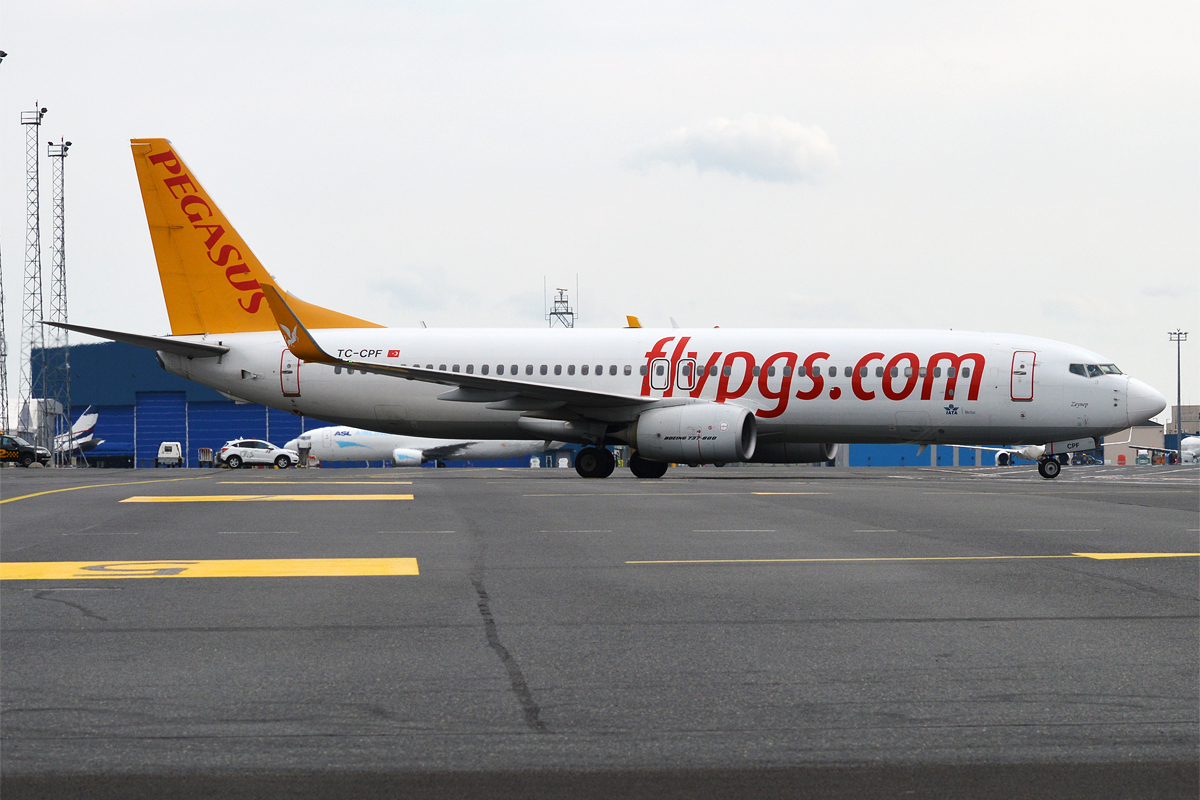
- TC-CPF, the aircraft involved in the accident, seen in 2017

Accident
- Date: 13 January 2018
- Summary: Runway excursion on landing
- Site: Trabzon Airport, Trabzon, Turkey; 40.9951°N 39.7897°E

Aircraft
- Aircraft type: Boeing 737-82R
- Aircraft name: Zeynep
- Operator: Pegasus Airlines
- IATA flight No.: PC8622
- ICAO flight No.: PGT8622
- Call sign: SUNTURK 8622
- Registration: TC-CPF
- Flight origin: Esenboğa International Airport, Ankara, Turkey
- Destination: Trabzon Airport, Trabzon, Turkey
- Occupants: 168
- Passengers: 162
- Crew: 6
- Fatalities: 0
- Survivors: 168

Pegasus Airlines Flight 8622 was a domestic flight from Ankara to Trabzon, Turkey. On 13 January 2018, while landing on runway 11 at Trabzon Airport, the Boeing 737-800 operating the flight ran off the left side of the runway and partially slid down a cliff. While there were no fatalities nor injuries of the 168 passengers and crew, the aircraft was damaged beyond repair and subsequently written off.

== Accident ==
Flight 8622 was a scheduled domestic flight from Esenboğa International Airport, Ankara, to Trabzon Airport. There were 162 passengers and 6 crew on board. The aircraft landed at 23:26 local time (20:26 UTC). After landing, the aircraft veered left, skidded off the runway, and slid down a cliff. The aircraft came to rest in a precarious position along the side of the cliff but did not slip into the sea due to the wet ground that caused the landing gear to be stuck in mud. An emergency evacuation was ordered by the cabin crew. The aircraft sustained considerable damage, with the right engine detaching and falling into the Black Sea. At the time, it was raining with visibility of 4 kilometres (2.5 mi). Following the accident, Trabzon Airport was closed until 08:00 local time (05:00 UTC) on 14 January. The aircraft was removed from the cliff face on 18 January,. During the recovery operation, Trabzon Airport was closed, with aircraft being diverted to Ordu–Giresun Airport, Gülyalı. The aircraft was declared a write-off.

== Aircraft ==
The aircraft involved was a Boeing 737-82R, with manufacturer serial number 40879, and line number 4267. It had the registration TC-CPF, was named "Zeynep", and was operated by the Turkish low-cost carrier Pegasus Airlines. The aircraft took its first flight on 15 November 2012, before being delivered to Pegasus Airlines on 30 November. It had flown 9 flights on 13 January with no reports of any damage or issues by pilots or ground crew.

== Investigation ==
The governor of Trabzon Province said that an investigation had been opened into the accident. The Directorate General of Civil Aviation is responsible for investigating aviation accidents in Turkey.

One of the pilots claimed that an engine had a power surge, which caused the excursion via asymmetric thrust. As of July 2026, no investigation findings had been published confirming or refuting these claims.

== See also ==
- Pegasus Airlines Flight 2193
