= İskele Sub-district =

İskele Sub-district is a sub-district of İskele District, Northern Cyprus.
