= Çamlıbel Sub-district =

Sub district of Girne District, Northern Cyprus

Çamlıbel Sub-district is a sub-district of Girne District, Northern Cyprus.
