= Pegasus Airlines Flight 2193 =

2020 aviation accident in Turkey

Coordinates: 40.9055063°N 29.3264491°E

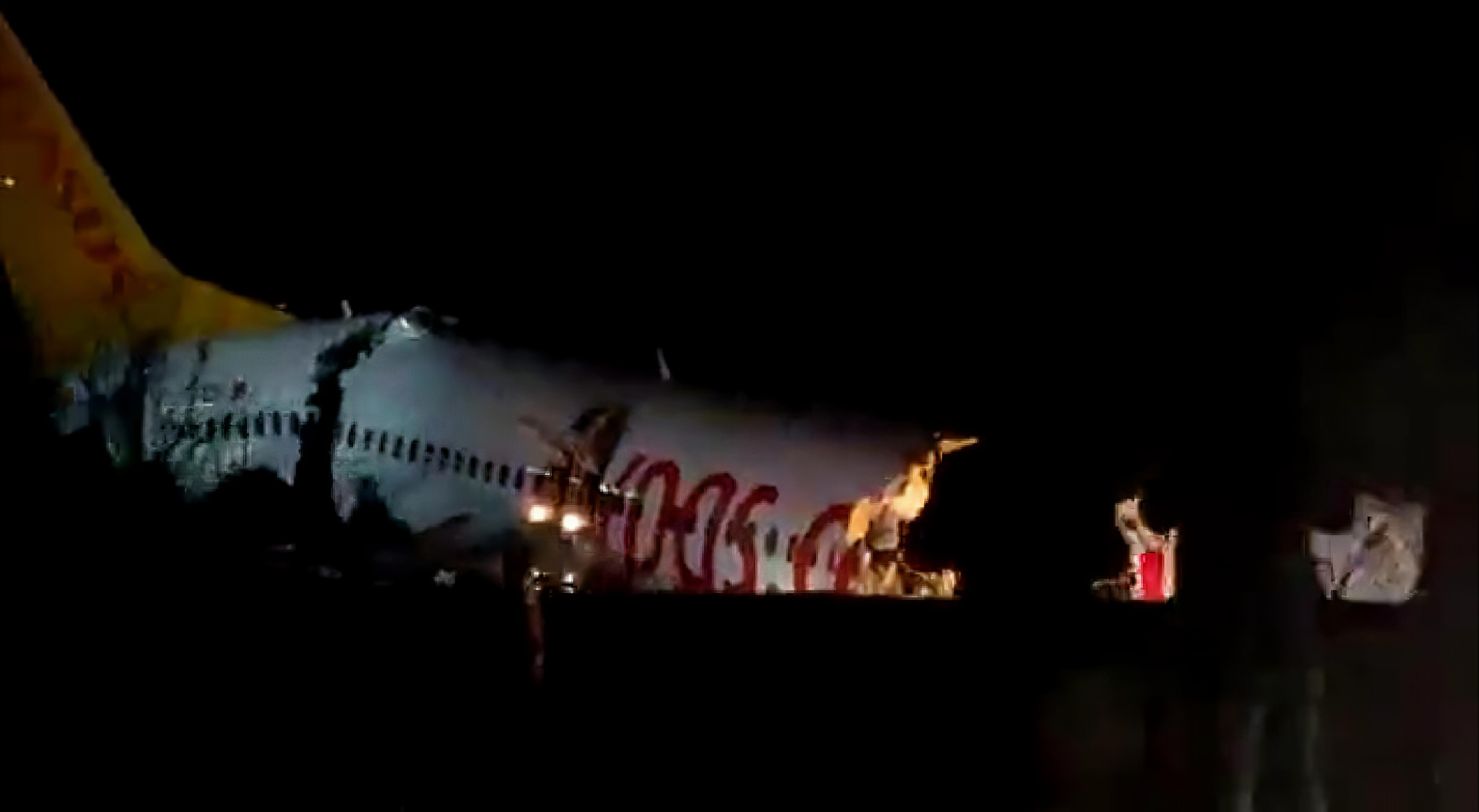
- Wreckage of the aircraft

Accident
- Date: 5 February 2020
- Summary: Runway overrun due to pilot error and ATC error
- Site: Istanbul Sabiha Gökçen International Airport, Pendik, Istanbul, Turkey

Aircraft
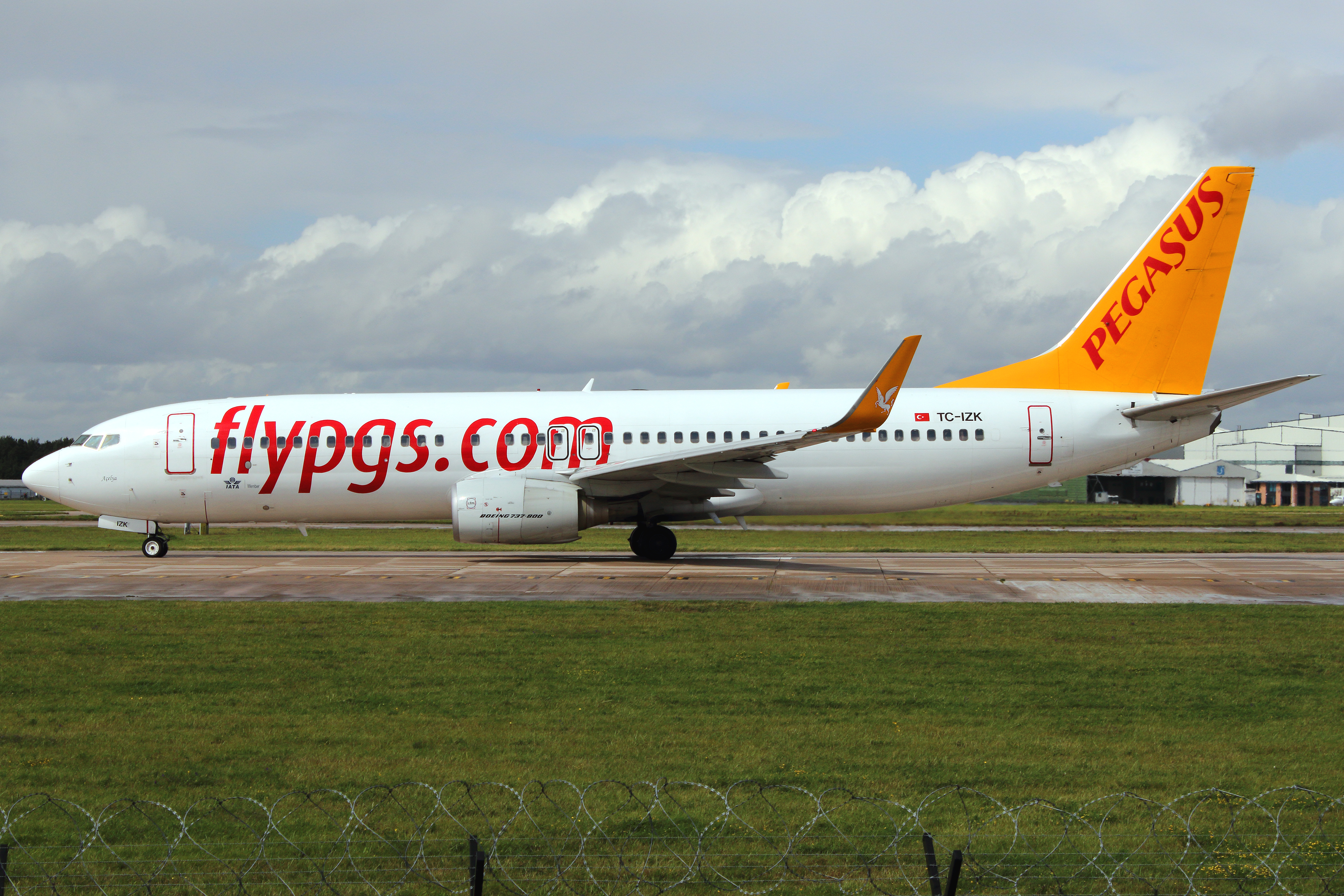
- TC-IZK, the aircraft involved in the accident, seen in 2019
- Aircraft type: Boeing 737-86J (Note: The last two alphanumeric characters of a Boeing aircraft indicate the Boeing customer code. A "Boeing 737-86J" is a Boeing 737-800 produced by Boeing for Air Berlin (the customer assigned customer code 6J by Boeing). Aircraft customer codes are based on the customer ordering the aircraft, and do not change if the aircraft is sold. See list of Boeing customer codes for more information.)
- Aircraft name: Açelya
- Operator: Pegasus Airlines
- IATA flight No.: PC2193
- ICAO flight No.: PGT87R
- Call sign: SUNTURK 87 ROMEO
- Registration: TC-IZK
- Flight origin: İzmir Adnan Menderes Airport, İzmir, Turkey
- Destination: Istanbul Sabiha Gökçen International Airport, Pendik, Istanbul, Turkey
- Occupants: 183
- Passengers: 177
- Crew: 6
- Fatalities: 3
- Injuries: 179
- Survivors: 180

Pegasus Airlines Flight 2193 was a scheduled domestic passenger flight from İzmir to Istanbul in Turkey operated by Pegasus Airlines. On 5 February 2020, the Boeing 737-800 operating the route skidded off the runway while landing at Istanbul-Sabiha Gökçen International Airport, Turkey. Three people were killed, 179 people were injured, and the aircraft was destroyed. This was the first fatal accident in the airline's history. The accident came less than a month after another Pegasus Airlines accident involving a Boeing 737 skidding off the runway at the same airport.

== Background ==
=== Aircraft ===
The aircraft was a Boeing 737-86J registered as TC-IZK, with serial number 37742. It was 11 years old at the time of the crash, having first flown in January 2009. The plane had previously been operated by the now-defunct German airline Air Berlin before being acquired by Pegasus in May 2016.

=== Crew ===
In command was Captain Mahmut Aslan, and his co-pilot was First Officer Ferdinand Pondaag, a Dutch national with 400 total flight hours.

== Accident ==
Flight 2193 operated within Turkey from İzmir Adnan Menderes Airport, İzmir, to Istanbul without incident. At approximately 18:30 local time, the plane attempted to land at Sabiha Gökçen in Istanbul in heavy rain and strong tailwinds. A thunderstorm with strong wind gusts was passing through the area at the time of the accident. Two other aircraft aborted their landing attempts at the same airport shortly before Flight 2193 landed.

After what Turkey's transport minister described as a "rough landing," the aircraft failed to decelerate. It skidded off the east end of the runway. The aircraft hit ILS antennas and a small building before it fell 30 metres (98 ft) down an embankment, impacting with a force that survivors described as like an explosion. The aircraft broke into three sections, with the forward section of the fuselage especially damaged during the incident. Passengers escaped the plane via gaps between the fuselage sections. A fire broke out, and was later extinguished by firefighters.

In the early hours of 6 February 2020, Turkey's health minister said three passengers were killed and 179 people were taken to local hospitals with injuries. 12 children were believed to be on board the plane, according to reports from the Turkish media. The pilots received treatment in the hospital, before they were taken to a police station to provide their statements.

== Investigation ==
The CEO of Pegasus Airlines, Mehmet T. Nane, stated that they had recovered the plane's black boxes, and had begun extracting the data inside. A preliminary report indicated that high tailwinds were present upon landing, and that the pilots, being unaware of this, may have ceased braking efforts prematurely.

After the incident some former employees from the airlines stated that the airlines would prioritize sales over safety, often forcing them to work more hours than legally permitted, and firing them without reason, sometimes without giving severance. Flights would spend less than 20 minutes on the ground and exceed legal limits in the skies, performing hasty safety checks and compromising on hygiene. A former technician called the CEO's press statement after the crash "crocodile tears".

On 26 December 2020, the final report into the accident was, instead of being published, shared among officials due to the fact that the Turkish Accident Investigation committee was then defunct. The final report stated that the accident was caused by pilot error and ATC error, compounded by windshear on landing. The pilots were at fault by the fact that they failed to go around before it was too late. The controller was faulted for not giving the pilots sufficient weather information, and all of this being complicated by windshear.

== See also ==
- Pegasus Airlines Flight 8622 – Another Pegasus Boeing 737 involved in a runway overrun
- Air India Express Flight 1344 – Another Boeing 737-800 that overran the runway and slid down an embankment later that year
