= Akdoğan Sub-district =

Akdoğan Sub-district is a sub-district of Gazimağusa District, Northern Cyprus.
