= Mağusa Sub-district =

Mağusa Sub-district is a sub-district of Gazimağusa District, Northern Cyprus.
