= Lefkoşa Sub-district =

Lefkoşa Sub-district is a sub-district of Lefkoşa District, Northern Cyprus.
