= Mehmetçik Sub-district =

Mehmetçik Sub-district is a sub-district of İskele District, Northern Cyprus.
