= Yeni Erenköy Sub-district =

Yeni Sub-district is a sub-district of İskele District, Northern Cyprus.
