= Lefke Sub-district =

District of Lefke, Northern Cyprus

Lefke Sub-district is a sub-district of Lefke District, Northern Cyprus.
