= Çukurova International Airport =

Airport serving Adana, Turkey

Çukurova International Airport Çukurova Uluslararası Havalimanı
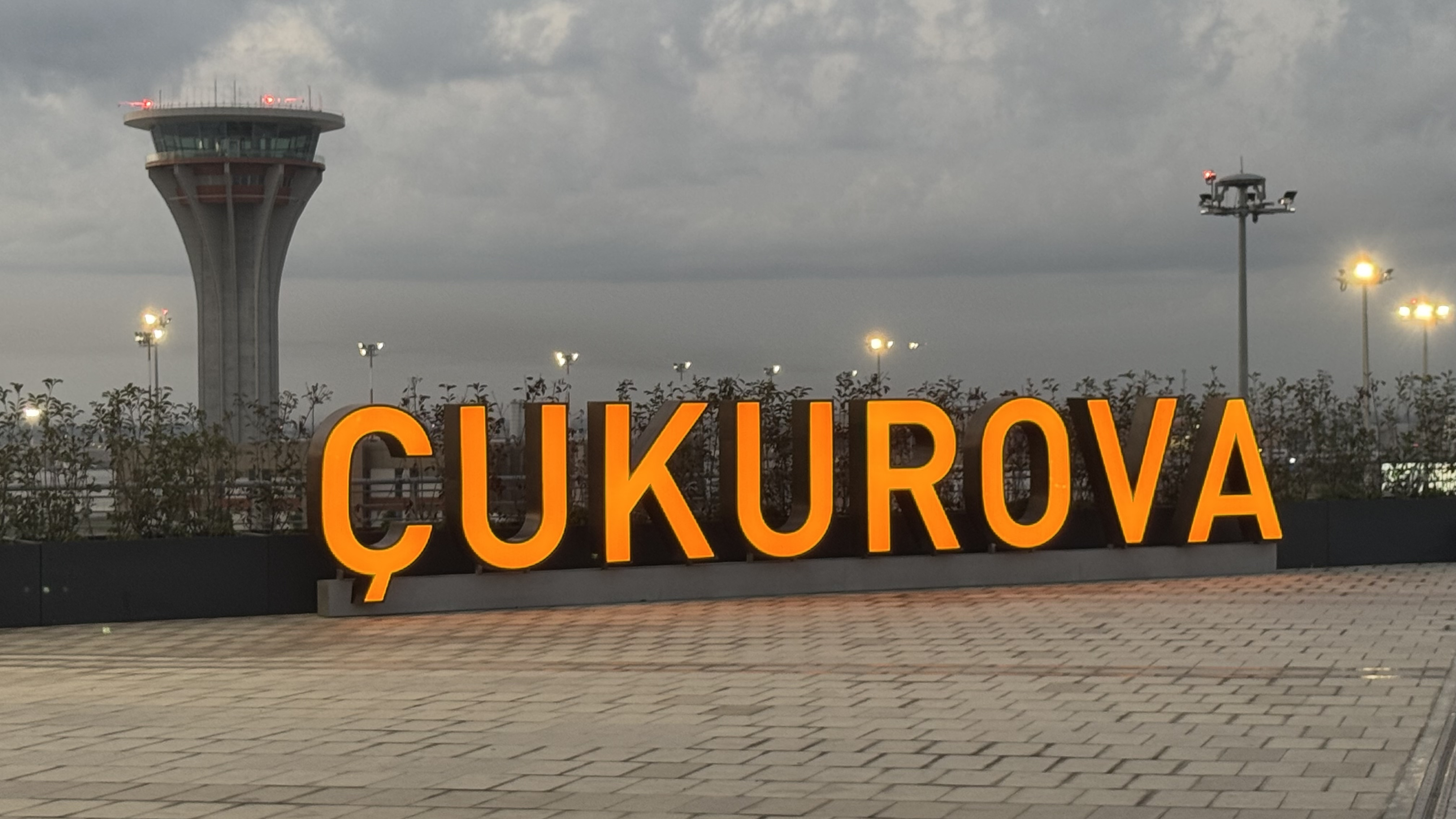
- Çukurova International Airport
- IATA: COV; ICAO: LTDB

Summary
- Airport type: Public
- Owner: DHMİ
- Operator: State Airports Administration (Turkish: Devlet Hava Meydanları İşletmesi (DHMİ)
- Serves: Mersin and Adana, Turkey
- Location: Tarsus, Mersin, Turkey
- Opened: 10 August 2024; 2 years ago
- Operating base for: Pegasus Airlines
- Elevation AMSL: 6 m (20 ft)
- Coordinates: 36°53′49″N 35°04′03″E
- Website: cukurovaairport.aero

Map
- Location of airport in Turkey

Runways
Direction	Length		Surface
Direction	m	ft	Surface
03L/21R	3,500	11,482	Concrete
03R/21L	3,500	11,482	Concrete

Statistics (2025)
- Annual passenger capacity: 9,000,000
- Passengers: 5,434,070
- Passenger change 2024–25: ▲182%
- Aircraft movements: 34,688
- Movements change 2024–25: ▲165%

Çukurova International Airport (IATA: COV, ICAO: LTDB) is an airport in the Tarsus district of Mersin Province, southern Turkey. It serves the provinces Mersin and Adana. The airport was built in order to replace its predecessor Adana Şakirpaşa Airport due to the old airport's location of being in the city centre, and had no room to expand or be modernised. When Adana Şakirpaşa Airport closed to commercial passenger airlines, many airlines switched their route to the new airport for Adana, namely Çukurova Airport.

== Location ==
The new airport was constructed at the west of Karasavran village between Çiçekli and Kargılı in Tarsus district of Mersin Province. The distance from the airport to Yenice, the main railroad junction is 7 km (4.3 mi), to Çukurova Motorway is 14 km (8.7 mi), and to Tarsus is about 20 km (12 mi). The airport is close to another project, the Kazanlı Coast Tourism Project, within the scope of Tourism centers of Mersin Province.

Çukurova is a region in mid-south Turkiye which includes the historical Cilicia of the antiquity. The Turkish provinces of Adana, Mersin, Osmaniye as well as a part of Hatay are in Çukurova. These provinces were being served by Adana Şakirpaşa Airport in the urban fabric of Adana city. However, the increasing air traffic necessitates a higher capacity airport.

== History ==
The construction contract was signed on 26 January 2012. According to a statement made by Binali Yıldırım, Minister of Communications, Maritime affairs and Telecommunications, it is a build-operate-transfer project. The undertaker is a consortium of "Skyline" and "Zonguldak Özel Sivil Havacılık". The builders have the right to operate the airport for a term of nine years and ten months. The minister added that the airport will have international status and will so help to increase the export of the region and the number of tourists. According to the newspaper Hürriyet, the project's cost will be 357 million Euro. When finished, it will serve to 15 million people, and the capacity will be doubled in the future.

The groundbreaking ceremony was held on 28 May 2013. In the ceremony, then-Minister of Transport Binali Yıldırım explained that the location of the airport was carefully chosen to serve both Adana and Mersin.

The formal opening ceremony of the new airport took place on 10 August 2024. Adana Şakirpaşa Airport closed at 00:00 on 11 August 2024 to all commercial airlines, and Çukurova Airport opened at 12:00 on 11 August 2024. The inauguration was done by President Recep Tayyip Erdoğan.

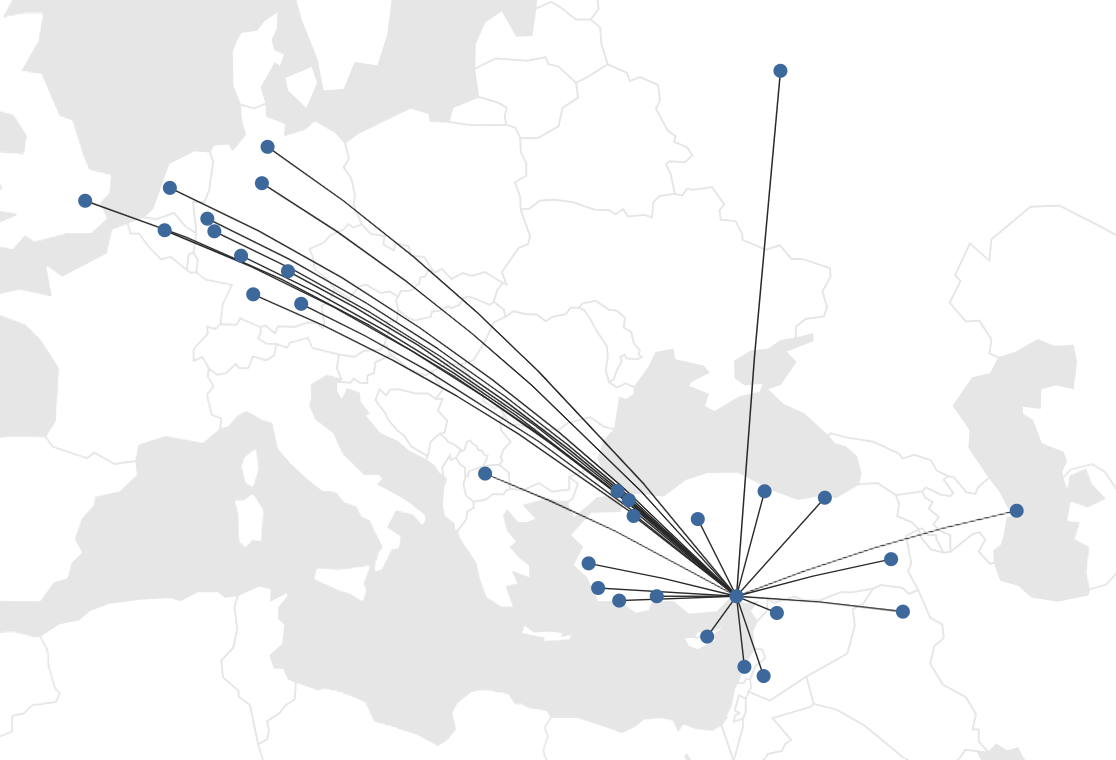
Çukurova Airport destinations - June 2026

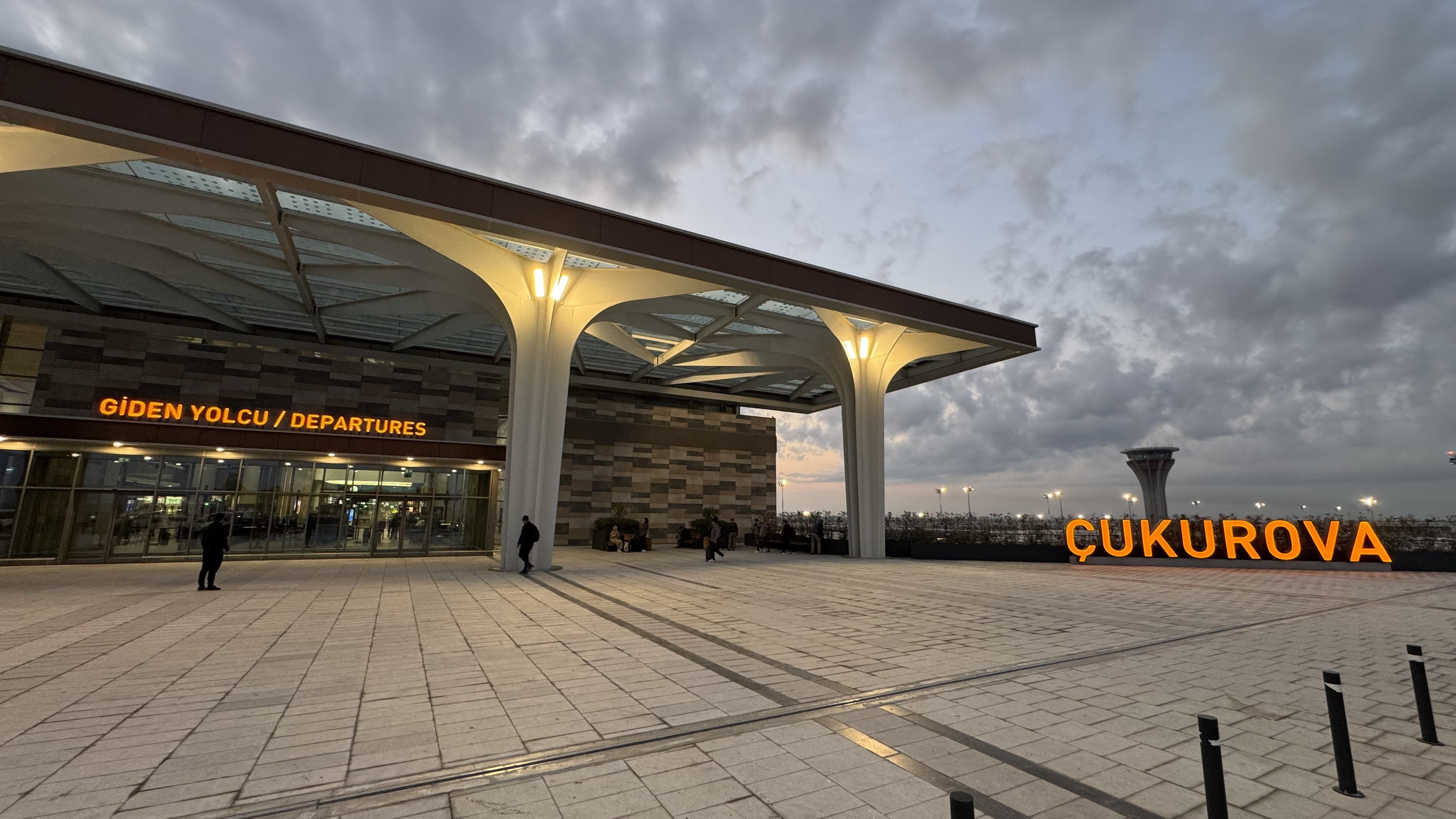
Departures entrance

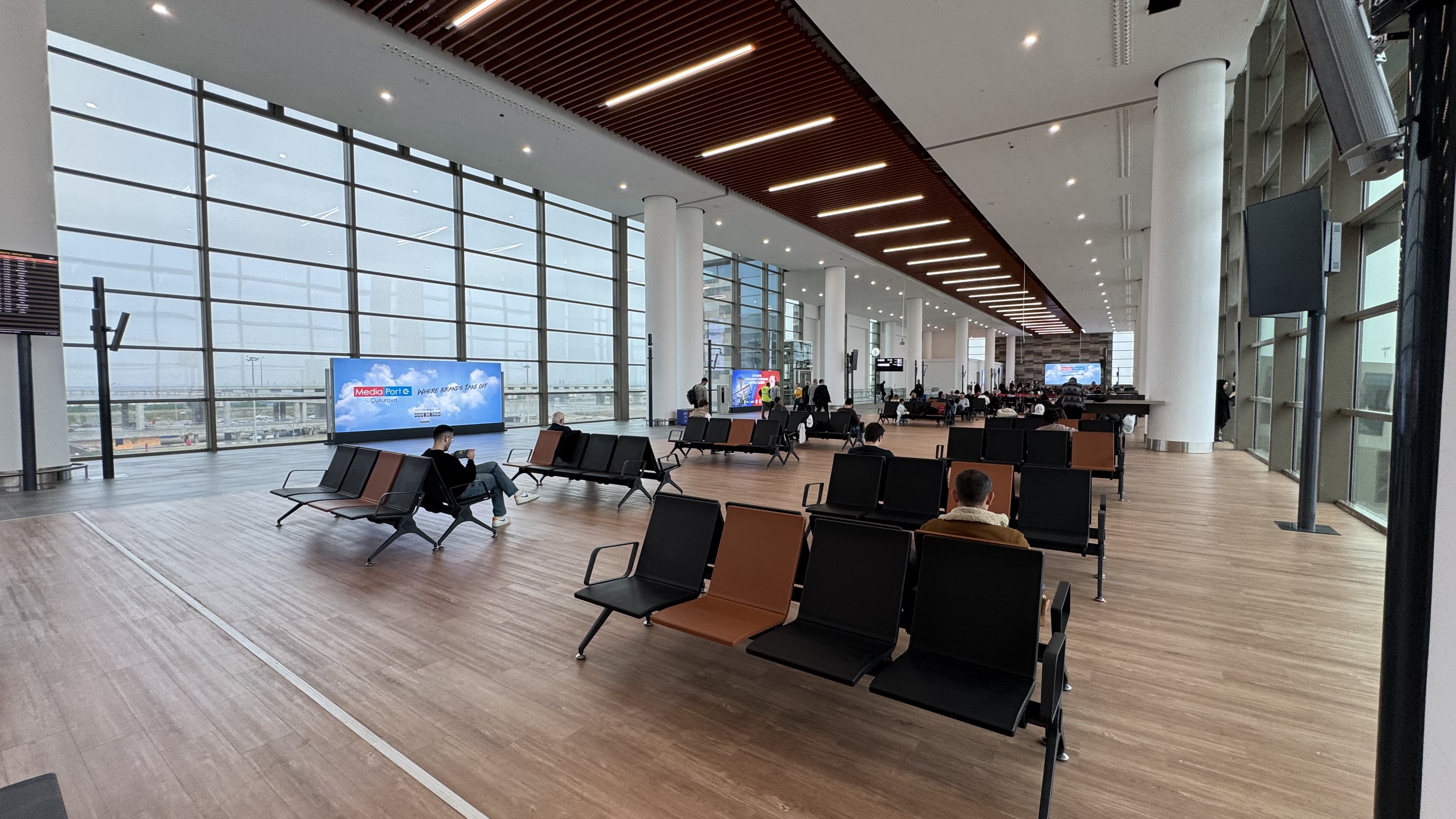
Waiting area

Shopping area

== Airlines and destinations ==
Airlines	Destinations
Aeroflot	Moscow–Sheremetyevo
AJet	Ankara, Beirut, Ercan, Istanbul–Sabiha Gökçen; Seasonal: Skopje
Azerbaijan Airlines	Seasonal: Baku
Corendon Airlines	Seasonal: Cologne/Bonn, Düsseldorf, Nuremberg
Eurowings	Seasonal: Berlin, Düsseldorf, Hamburg
Fly Cham	Aleppo, Damascus
Fly Kıbrıs Airlines	Ercan
Pegasus Airlines	Antalya, Beirut, Bodrum, Dalaman, Düsseldorf, Erbil, Ercan, Istanbul–Sabiha Gökçen, İzmir, London–Stansted, Trabzon, Van; Seasonal: Berlin
SunExpress	Antalya, Bursa, Düsseldorf, Frankfurt, İzmir, London–Stansted, Samsun, Stuttgart, Trabzon, Van; Seasonal: Amsterdam, Berlin, Brussels, Cologne/Bonn Hannover, Munich
Turkish Airlines	Istanbul

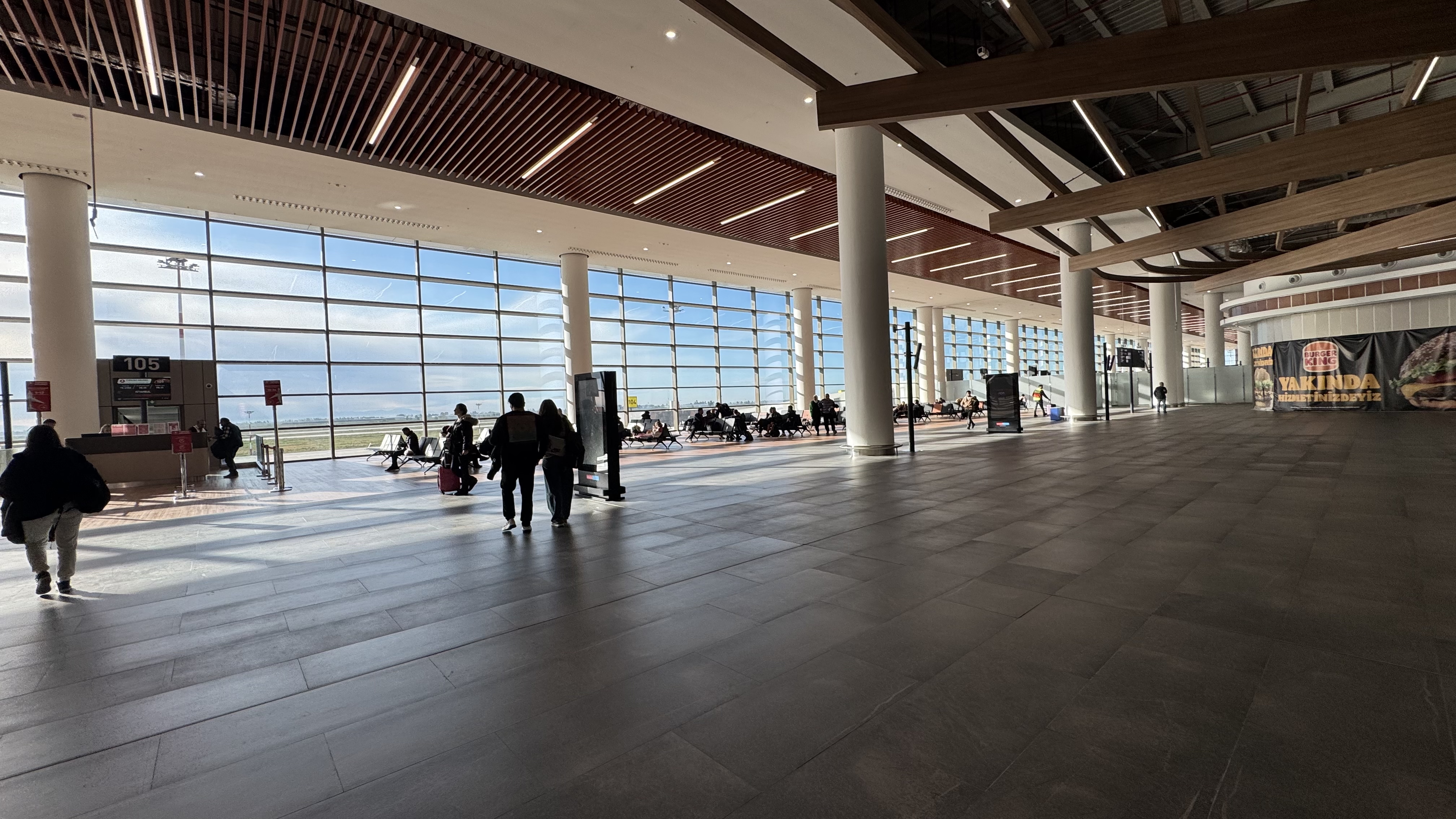
Inside the airport

== Cargo ==
The cargo terminal at Çukurova International Airport was inaugurated in 2025. Located within the borders of Mersin Province, the airport primarily serves the export logistics needs of Adana, Mersin and other provinces in the Çukurova region, including Osmaniye, Niğde, and Hatay.

Operated by Turkish Cargo, the facility is the second-largest air cargo terminal in Turkey. It has an annual cargo handling capacity of 25,000 tons and is designed with a modular structure that allows for future expansion. The total size of the storage and goods acceptance areas is 11,000 m^{2}.

The terminal handles high-value and sensitive goods such as veterinary vaccines, seafood, fresh fruits and vegetables, cut flowers, textile products, and ship spare parts, which are transported to 112 countries and 200 destinations. Approximately 44% of the cargo consists of special cargo, highlighting the terminal's significant contribution to the region's foreign trade volume.

== Traffic statistics ==
Çukurova İnternational Airport passenger traffic statistics
Year (months)	Domestic	% change	International	% change	Total	% change
2025	4,143,871	▲179%	1,290,199	▲190%	5,434,070	▲182%
2024	1,474,305	Steady	443,233	Steady	1,917,538	Steady

^1: 2024 statistics correspond to the last 5 months of 2024 since the opening of the airport.

== See also ==
- Adana Şakirpaşa Airport
