= Turkish Airlines Flight 278 =

1994 plane crash in Turkey

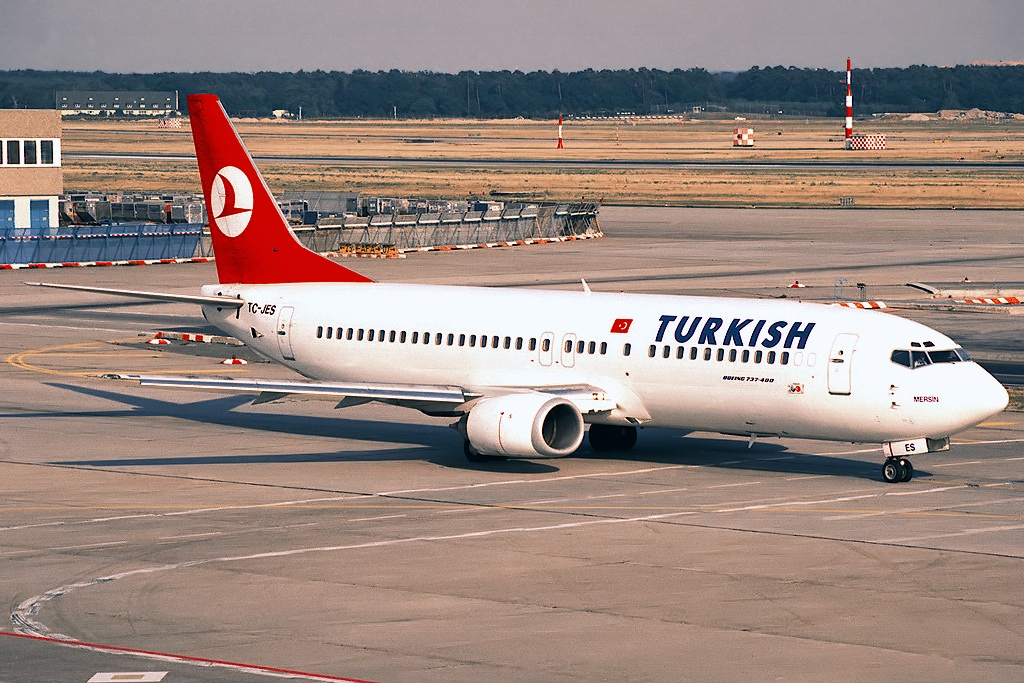
- TC-JES, the aircraft involved in the accident, pictured in July 1994

Accident
- Date: 29 December 1994
- Summary: Controlled flight into terrain due to pilot error
- Site: Near Van Ferit Melen Airport, Van, Turkey; 38°24′00″N 43°13′48″E

Aircraft
- Aircraft type: Boeing 737-4Y0
- Aircraft name: Mersin
- Operator: Turkish Airlines
- IATA flight No.: TK278
- ICAO flight No.: THY278
- Call sign: TURKISH 278
- Registration: TC-JES
- Flight origin: Ankara Esenboğa Airport, Ankara, Turkey
- Destination: Van Ferit Melen Airport, Van, Turkey
- Occupants: 76
- Passengers: 69
- Crew: 7
- Fatalities: 57
- Injuries: 19
- Survivors: 19

Location of departure and destination airports and crash site

Turkish Airlines Flight 278, operated by a Boeing 737-400 registered TC-JES and named Mersin, was a domestic scheduled flight from Ankara Esenboğa Airport to Van Ferit Melen Airport in eastern Turkey that crashed on 29 December 1994 during its final approach to land in driving snow. Five of the seven crew and 52 of the 69 passengers lost their lives, while 2 crew members and 17 passengers survived with serious injuries.

== Aircraft ==
The aircraft, a Boeing 737-400 with two CFMI CFM56-3C1 jet engines and was built by Boeing with manufacturer serial number 26074/2376. The captain was Adem Ungun, and the first officer was Yavuz Alıcı.

== Crash ==
At 15:30 EET (13:30 UTC) on 29 December 1994, the plane struck a hill near Edremit district of Van Province at 1,700 m (5,700 ft) above mean sea level around 4 km (2.5 mi) from Van Airport while on a third VOR-DME approach to the Runway 03 in bad weather, despite a warning from air traffic control not to attempt any more approaches in a snowstorm. The visibility was 900 m (3,000 ft) reducing to 300 m (980 ft) in heavy driving snow.

== Victims ==
The aircraft had a crew of 7 and 69 passengers including two babies. Two of the crew and 17 passengers survived the crash with serious injuries.

== See also ==
- List of accidents and incidents involving airliners by airline
