= Girne Central Sub-district =

Administrative area in Northern Cyprus

Girne Sub-district is a sub-district of Girne District, Northern Cyprus.
