= Air Manas =

Airline of Kyrgyzstan

Air Manas Авиакомпания «Эйр Манас»
IATA	ICAO	Call sign
ZM	MBB	AIR MANAS
- Founded: 2006
- Ceased operations: 2022
- Operating bases: Manas International Airport
- Fleet size: 1
- Destinations: 2
- Headquarters: Bishkek, Kyrgyzstan
- Website: www.airmanas.com

Air Manas was a low-cost airline headquartered in Bishkek, Kyrgyzstan with its base at Manas International Airport.

In October 2022, it was reported that the airline was grounded due to sanctions imposed on its Russian aircraft lessor.

== History ==
Air Manas was founded in 2006 in Bishkek. The first flight of Air Manas was carried out in December 2009. In June 2012, 49% of the air company was bought by a Turkish Pegasus Airlines. The first flight under the brand name Pegasus Asia was operated from Bishkek to Istanbul on 22 March 2013. Now the airline operates domestic flights between Bishkek to Osh, as well as international flights from Kyrgyzstan to India, Russia, Turkey and China.

The efforts of the Kyrgyz Government to attract foreign investments had borne fruit: mutual visits of high-level governmental delegations gave a serious impetus to bilateral trade relations between Turkey and Kyrgyzstan. Thus, at the end of 2012 in the basis of pre-existing airline, a new Kyrgyz airline with the same name of "Air Manas" was created, being 51% owned by the Kyrgyz side and 49% by newly attracted strategic partner Pegasus Airlines, one of the leading air companies in Europe.

Air Manas had its own certified aviation-technical base for the operational maintenance of aircraft. The airline, along with all airlines based in Kyrgyzstan was on the list of air carriers banned in the European Union.

== Destinations ==
Kyrgyzstan

- Bishkek — Manas International Airport (base)
- Osh — Osh Airport

== Fleet ==
As of July 2026, Air Manas operates the following aircraft:

Aircraft	In service	Orders	Notes
Airbus A220-300	1	—	
Total	1	—	

=== Former fleet ===
As of May 2022, the Air Manas fleet consisted of the following aircraft:

Air Manas fleet
Aircraft	In service	Orders	Passengers	Notes
Airbus A220-300	1	—	145	Stored due to sanctions against its Russian lessor
Total	1	—		

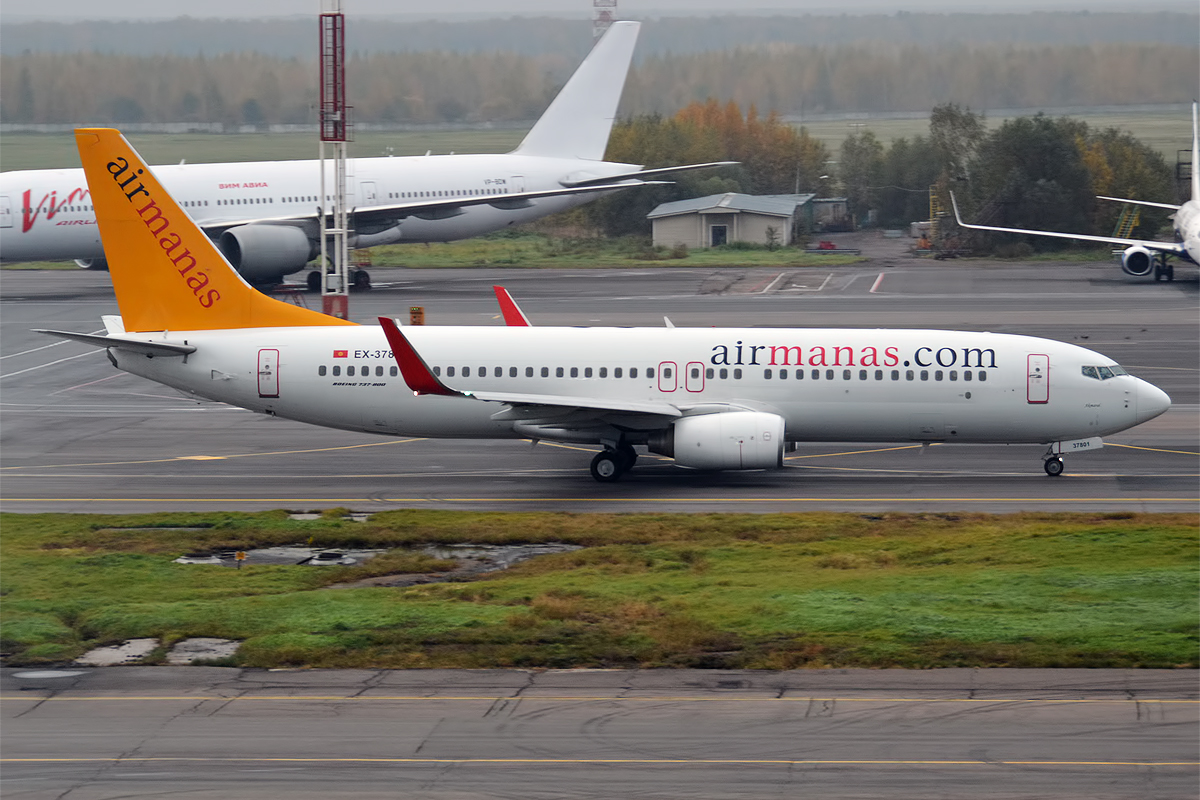
A former Air Manas Boeing 737-800 in Moscow in 2016.

The airline also previously operated the following aircraft types:

- Boeing 737-400
- Boeing 737-800
