= Güzelyurt Sub-district =

Güzelyurt Sub-district is a sub-district of Güzelyurt District, Northern Cyprus.
