= Karsavran, Tarsus =

Karsavran
- Neighbourhood
- Location in Turkey
- Coordinates: 36°54′N 35°06′E
- Country: Turkey
- Province: Mersin
- District: Tarsus
- Elevation: 10 m (33 ft)
- Population (2022): 93
- Time zone: UTC+3 (TRT)
- Area code: 0324

Karsavran is a neighbourhood in the municipality and district of Tarsus, Mersin Province, Turkey. Its population was 93 as of 2022. It is situated 7 kilometres (4.3 mi) south of Turkish state highway D.400 in Çukurova plains.

Its distance to Tarsus is 22 kilometres (14 mi) and to Mersin is 52 kilometres (32 mi). The village's main economic activity is farming. Cotton and various vegetables are produced. Çukurova Airport construction site is to the west of the village.
