= Değirmenlik Sub-district =

Değirmenlik Sub-district is a sub-district of Lefkoşa District, Northern Cyprus.
