= Çiçekli, Tarsus =

Çiçekli
- Neighbourhood
- Location in Turkey
- Coordinates: 36°52′N 35°05′E
- Country: Turkey
- Province: Mersin
- District: Tarsus
- Elevation: 5 m (16 ft)
- Population (2022): 789
- Time zone: UTC+3 (TRT)
- Area code: 0324

Çiçekli is a neighbourhood in the municipality and district of Tarsus, Mersin Province, Turkey. Its population is 789 (2022). It is situated in the Çukurova (Cilicia) plains. It is to the south of Yenice and the state highway D.400. The distance to Tarsus is 15 kilometres (9.3 mi) and the distance to Mersin is 42 kilometres (26 mi). Construction of the Çukurova Airport is planned near Çiçekli.
