= Margo, Nicosia =

Margo: Μαργό (Greek); Margo (Turkish)
- Uninhabited village
- Location in Cyprus
- Coordinates: 35°4′39″N 33°29′29″E
- Country (de jure): Cyprus
  - District: Nicosia District
- Country (de facto): Northern Cyprus
  - District: Lefkoşa District
- Time zone: UTC+2 (EET)
  - Summer (DST): UTC+3 (EEST)

Margo (Greek: Μαργό; Turkish: Margo) is an uninhabited village in the Nicosia District of Cyprus, located west of Pyrogi. It is under de facto control of Northern Cyprus. Today it is uninhabited, as the village lies within military area and can only be visited with permission of the Turkish military. The village's entire population was made of Jewish Cypriot people who were running the Margo Farm.
