= Trabzon Airport =

Airport in Trabzon, Turkey

Trabzon Airport Trabzon Havalimanı
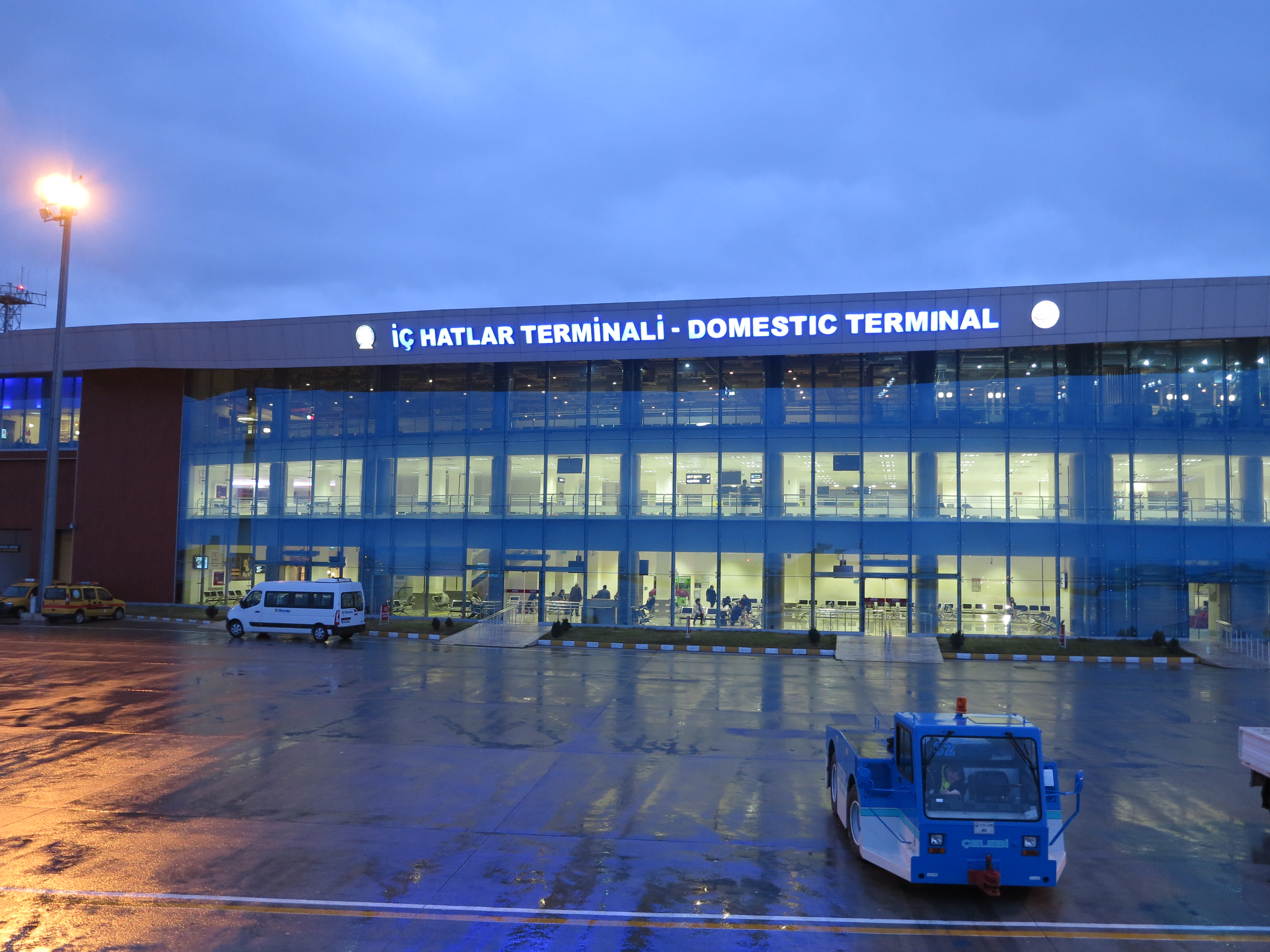
- IATA: TZX; ICAO: LTCG

Summary
- Airport type: Public
- Operator: General Directorate of State Airports Authority
- Serves: Trabzon, Turkey
- Location: Ortahisar, Trabzon, Turkey
- Opened: 1957; 69 years ago
- Operating base for: Pegasus Airlines
- Elevation AMSL: 104 ft (32 m)
- Coordinates: 40°59′42″N 39°47′23″E
- Website: www.dhmi.gov.tr/Sayfalar/Havalimani/Trabzon/AnaSayfa.aspx

Map
- Location of airport in Turkey

Runways
Direction	Length		Surface
Direction	m	ft	Surface
11/29	2,640	8,661	Asphalt

Statistics (2025)
- Annual passenger capacity: 4,000,000
- Passengers: 3,874,640
- Passenger change 2024–25: ▲6%
- Aircraft movements: 26,507
- Movements change 2024–25: ▲4%

Trabzon Airport (IATA: TZX, ICAO: LTCG) is an airport near the city of Trabzon in the eastern Black Sea region of Turkey. The airport opened in 1957.

== Airlines and destinations ==
The following airlines operate regular scheduled and charter flights at Trabzon Airport:

Airlines	Destinations
Air Arabia	Sharjah; Seasonal: Abu Dhabi
AJet	Ankara, Bursa, Diyarbakır, Istanbul–Sabiha Gökçen; Seasonal: Munich
Azerbaijan Airlines	Baku
Centrum Air	Tashkent
Taban Air	Seasonal: Imam Khomeini International Airport
Flydubai	Seasonal: Dubai–International
Flynas	Abha; Seasonal: Dammam, Jeddah, Riyadh
Gulf Air	Seasonal: Bahrain
Jazeera Airways	Seasonal: Kuwait City
Kuwait Airways	Seasonal: Kuwait City
Oman Air	Seasonal: Muscat
Pegasus Airlines	Adana/Mersin, Antalya, Ercan, Istanbul–Sabiha Gökçen, Izmir; Seasonal: Amman–Queen Alia, Bahrain, Dammam, Doha, Düsseldorf, Gaziantep, Jeddah, Kocaeli, Kuwait City, Medina, Riyadh
Qanot Sharq	Tashkent
Qatar Airways	Seasonal: Doha
SalamAir	Seasonal: Muscat
Somon Air	Dushanbe
Southwind Airlines	Seasonal charter: Bahrain
SunExpress	Antalya, Düsseldorf, Izmir, Muscat; Seasonal: Adana/Mersin, Cologne/Bonn
Turkish Airlines	Istanbul; Seasonal: Munich

== Traffic statistics ==
Trabzon Airport passenger traffic statistics
Year (months)	Domestic	% change	International	% change	Total	% change
2025	3,029,171	▲6%	845,469	▲4%	3,874,640	▲6%
2024	2,825,342	▲6%	810,237	▼4%	3,655,579	▲3%
2023	2,696,068	▲8%	839,834	▲20%	3,535,902	▲11%
2022	2,485,126	▲4%	700,103	▲185%	3,185,229	▲21%
2021	2,396,829	▲38%	245,498	▲303%	2,642,327	▲47%
2020	1,740,729	▼48%	60,871	▼85%	1,801,600	▼52%
2019	3,373,461	▼10%	397,417	▲45%	3,770,818	▼6%
2018	3,754,162	▼5%	274,401	▲34%	4,028,563	▼3%
2017	3,944,881	▲10%	204,048	▲62%	4,148,929	▲12%
2016	3,588,177	▲10%	125,817	▲11%	3,713,994	▲10%
2015	3,249,120	▲22%	113,679	▲4%	3,362,799	▲21%
2014	2,668,349	▲6%	109,187	▲19%	2,777,536	▲6%
2013	2,528,990	▲9%	91,897	▲25%	2,620,887	▲9%
2012	2,320,510	▲6%	73,640	▼18%	2,404,150	▲5%
2011	2,190,503	▲16%	89,514	▲32%	2,280,017	▲16%
2010	1,895,601	▲24%	67,568	▲4%	1,963,169	▲23%
2009	1,531,780	▲11%	65,125	▼27%	1,596,905	▲9%
2008	1,380,926	▼1%	88,787	▲4%	1,469,713	▼1%
2007	1,397,175	Steady	85,585	Steady	1,482,760	Steady

== Accidents and incidents ==
On 13 January 2018, a Boeing 737-800 (TC-CPF) on Pegasus Airlines Flight 8622 veered off the left-hand side of the far end of runway 11 whilst landing. None of the 168 persons on board (162 passengers and 6 crew) were reported to have serious injuries. The cause of the incident has not yet been determined.

On 26 May 2003, Ukrainian-Mediterranean Airlines Flight 4230, a Yakovlev Yak-42 chartered by the Spanish government, was completing a charter flight from Bishkek to Zaragoza with an intermediate stop in Trabzon, carrying 62 Spanish peacekeepers and 13 crew members. The 62 passengers were respectively 41 members of the Land Forces and 21 members of the Air Force who were returning to Spain following a peacekeeping mission in Afghanistan. While descending to Trabzon Airport by night, the crew encountered poor visibility due to foggy conditions. Unable to establish a visual contact with the approach lights and the runway 29, the crew initiated a go-around procedure. Few minutes later, while completing a second approach, the crew failed to realize he was not following the correct pattern for an approach to runway 29 when the aircraft impacted a mountain at an altitude of 4,600 feet. The aircraft disintegrated on impact and all 75 occupants were killed. The wreckage was found 3.5 km east of the village of Maçka, about 23 km southwest of the airport.

On 20 May 1989, Alexander Zuyev, a Soviet pilot of the VVS Frontal Aviation Regiment based at Mikha Tskhakaya, Georgian SSR (present day Senaki, Georgia), defected from the Soviet Union by flying his Mig 29 plane to Trabzon. Turkey returned the plane to the Soviet Union, citing its desire to maintain a good relationship with the Soviet Union. However, the pilot was not extradited and was eventually provided asylum by the United States of America.

== In popular culture ==
A fictionalized version of the airfield is featured in the campaign of Call of Duty: Black Ops Cold War.
