= Pegasus Airlines =

Low-cost airline of Turkey

Pegasus Airlines Pegasus Hava Taşımacılığı A.Ş.

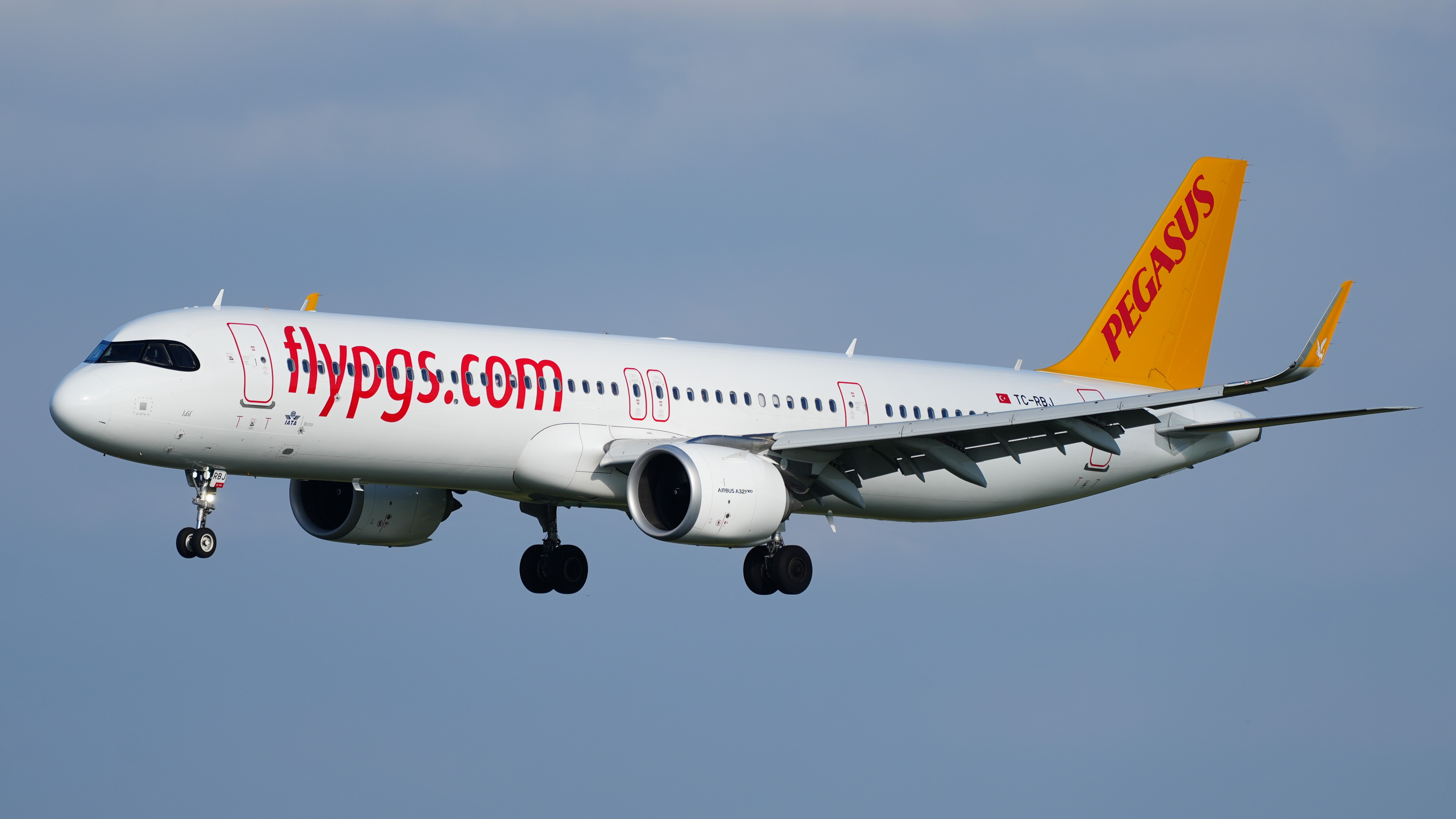
- A Pegasus Airlines Airbus A321neo
IATA	ICAO	Call sign
PC	PGT	SUNTURK
- Founded: 12 January 1991; 35 years ago
- Operating bases: Adana/Mersin; Ankara; Antalya; Bodrum; Dalaman; Ercan; Istanbul; Istanbul–Sabiha Gökçen; İzmir; Kayseri; Samsun; Trabzon
- Frequent-flyer program: Pegasus BolBol
- Subsidiaries: Pegasus Cargo; Czech Airlines (including Smartwings; since 2026)
- Fleet size: 131 (June 2026)
- Destinations: 161 (October 2026)
- Parent company: Esas Holding (52.81%)
- Traded as: BİST: PGSUS
- Headquarters: Pendik, Istanbul, Turkey
- Key people: Güliz Öztürk (CEO)
- Revenue: ▲€1.507 billion (H1 2026)
- Operating income: ▼ −€126.916 million (H1 2026)
- Net income: ▼ −€244.686 million (H1 2026)
- Total assets: ▲€8.296 billion (June 2026)
- Total equity: ▼€2.122 billion (June 2026)
- Employees: ▲9,863 (June 2026)
- Website: www.flypgs.com

Pegasus Airlines (Turkish: Pegasus Hava Taşımacılığı A.Ş.; BİST: PGSUS), sometimes stylized as flypgs, is a Turkish low-cost airline headquartered in the Kurtköy area of Pendik, Istanbul. Its primary operating base is Sabiha Gökçen International Airport, with additional bases across Turkey. As of October 2026, the airline serves 161 destinations in 57 countries across Europe, Asia and North Africa.

Established in 1989 as an inclusive-tour charter airline in partnership with Aer Lingus, Pegasus commenced flight operations in 1990. The airline was acquired by Esas Holding in 2005 and subsequently adopted a low-cost business model. As of June 2026, Pegasus operated a fleet of 131 aircraft, primarily comprising members of the Airbus A320neo family.

In December 2025, Pegasus announced an agreement to acquire Czech Airlines and its subsidiary Smartwings for €154 million, including related receivables. The acquisition was completed on 1 October 2026 following the receipt of the necessary regulatory approvals. The combined airline group has more than 175 aircraft, with Smartwings continuing to operate under its existing brand.

== History ==
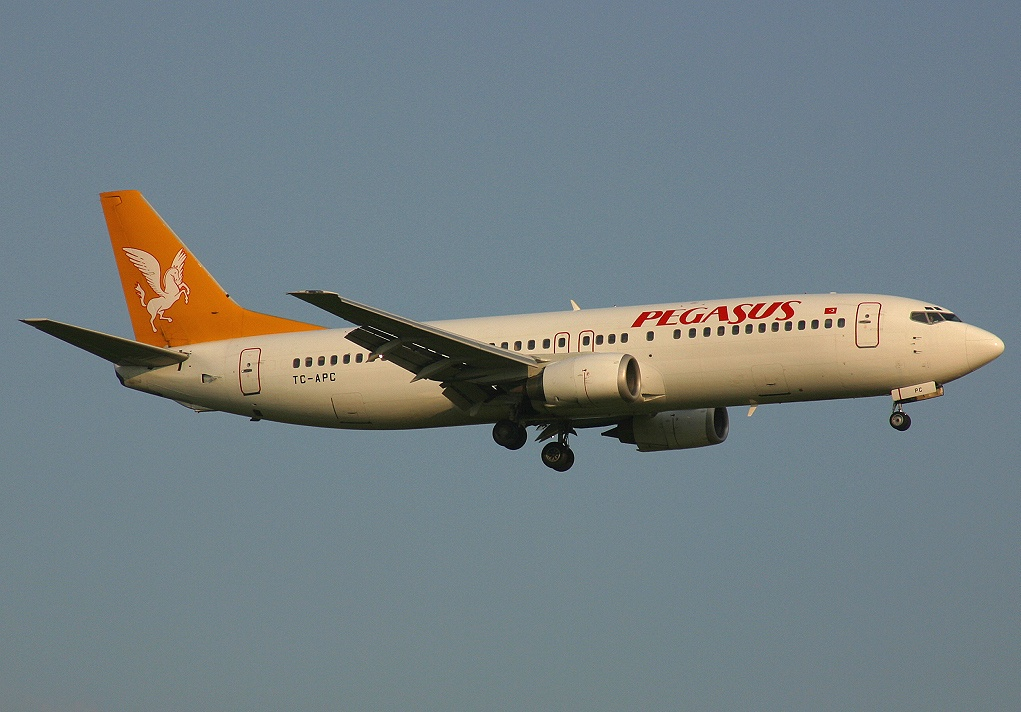
A former Pegasus Airlines Boeing 737-400 in the airline's old livery (2002)

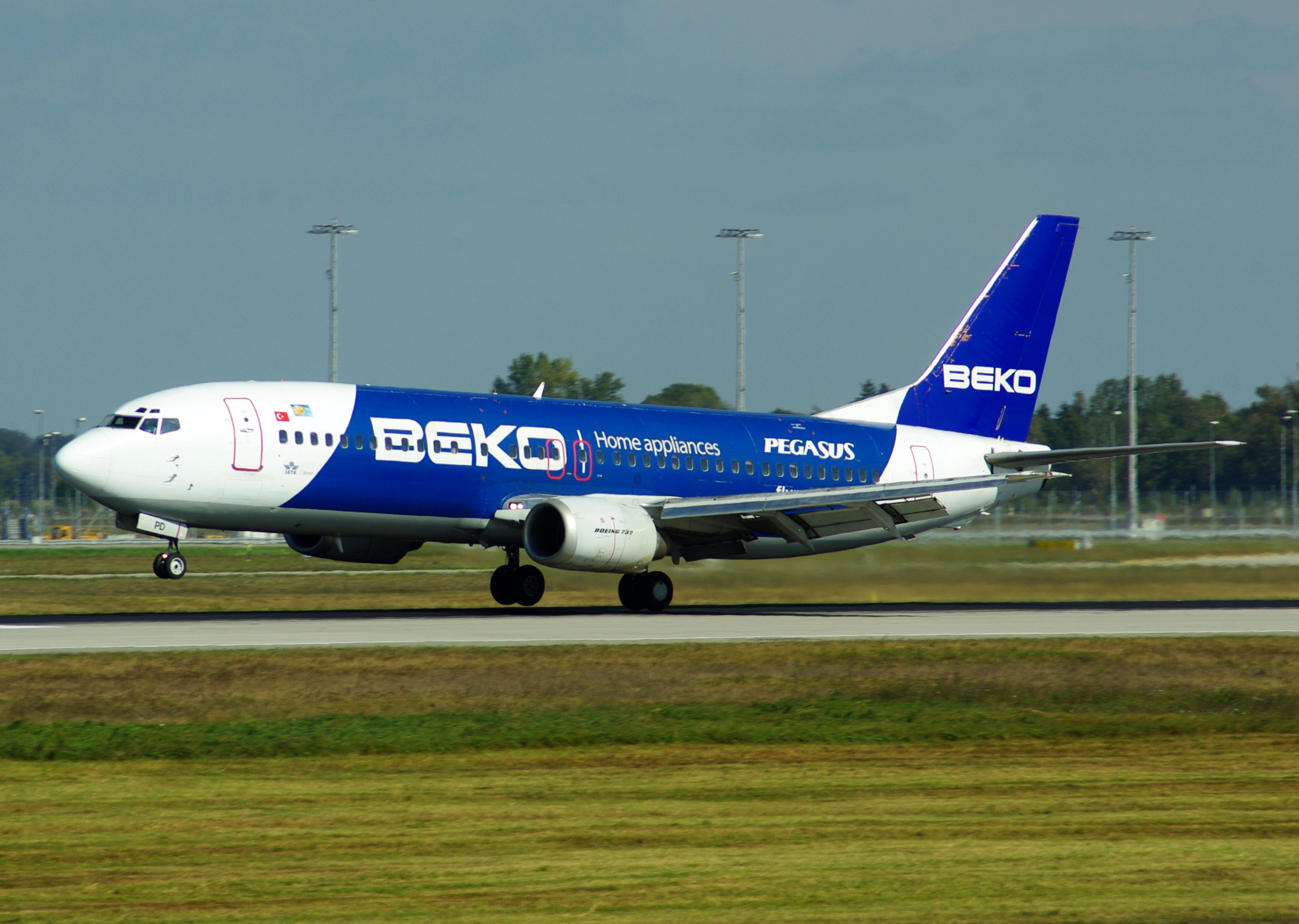
A former Pegasus Airlines Boeing 737-400 in special Beko livery (2009)

=== Foundation and early years ===
On 1 December 1989, two businesses, Net and Silkar, partnered with Aer Lingus to create an inclusive tour charter airline called Pegasus Airlines; services were inaugurated on 15 April 1990 with two Boeing 737-400s. In Greek mythology, Pegasus (Greek: Πήγασος Pégasos, 'strong') was a winged horse sired by Poseidon, in his role as horse-god, and foaled by the Gorgon Medusa. However, four months after the launch, Iraq invaded Kuwait, and the seven-month occupation that followed had a serious effect on Turkish tourism. By 1992, tourists began returning to the country, and Pegasus grew with the acquisition of a third 737-400. The airline leased a further two Airbus A320s to meet the summer demand.

After two positive years, Aer Lingus and Net sold their shares in the company in 1994 to Istanbul-based Yapı Kredi bank, making Pegasus a purely Turkish company.

On 4 September 1997, Pegasus placed an order for one 737-400 and one 737-800 from Boeing Commercial Airplanes, making it the first Turkish carrier to place an order for the Boeing 737 Next Generation. The airline also signed lease agreements for a further 10 737-800s from the ILFC.

In January 2005, ESAS Holdings purchased Pegasus Airlines and placed Ali Sabanci as the chairman. Two months later, he changed the airline from a charter airline to a low-cost airline. In November 2005, Pegasus placed an order for 12 new 737-800s from Boeing, which was backed up with an order for a further 12 737-800s in November 2008. The latter order had flexibility, as the orders could be changed to the 149-seat 737-700 or the 215-seat 737-900 depending on market demand. In 2018, Pegasus tried to acquire an A380, but later cancelled the order.

In 2007, Pegasus had reached a domestic market share of 15%, which grew to 27% in 2013. In 2019, it carried a total of 29.87 million passengers.

=== Development since 2010 ===
In November 2011, Air Berlin and Pegasus Airlines launched Air Berlin Turkey, which was aimed at the charter market between Germany and Turkey. The new airline, however, was absorbed into Pegasus Airlines on 31 March 2013.

In 2012, Pegasus Airlines, the second-largest airline in Turkey, signed for up to 100 A320neo family aircraft, of which 75, 57 A320neos and 18 A321neos, were firm orders. Pegasus became a new Airbus customer and the first Turkish airline to order the A320neo. This was the largest single commercial aircraft order ever placed by an airline in Turkey at that time and was announced on 18 December 2012 at a ceremony attended by Binali Yıldırım, the Turkish Minister of Transport. In June 2012, Pegasus Airlines bought 49% of the Kyrgyz air company Air Manas. On 22 March 2013, the air company operated its first flight under the brand name Pegasus Asia.

The company offered 34.5% of its shares of stock to the public. The shares began to be traded at the Borsa Istanbul as BİST: PGSUS on 26 April 2013.

In October 2016, Pegasus Airlines announced it was offering three of its aircraft on the ACMI and leasing markets, stating severely decreasing passenger numbers.

On 5 February 2020 a runway excursion would turn into the first fatal incident in the history of the airlines. After the incident some former employees from the airlines stated that the airlines would prioritize sales over safety, putting staff under pressure firing them without reasons and severance. Flights would spend little time on ground and exceed legal limits in air, performing hasty safety checks and compromising on hygiene. Former employees called the CEO's press statement on the grievance "Crocodile tears".

In August 2022, Pegasus Airlines experienced a data breach that exposed over 6.5TB of data, including a number of internal passwords and the personal information of flight crew. The breach occurred after Pegasus accidentally configured one of the Amazon S3 storage buckets used for PegasusEFB, its electronic flight bag system, to be without any security, exposing its contents to the public Internet. The breach affected Turkish Airlines and Air Manas, who also used PegasusEFB. The breach was caused by Corporate negligence and a $183,000 fine could have been imposed on the airlines by the Turkish Data Protection Authority.

The airlines ranked fifth worst for flight delays from UK airports in 2022. According to AirHelp, Pegasus airlines was ranked the sixth worst airline in 2024. This ranking stems from the fact that the airlines is inferior to its competitors in all key parameters. Particularly long flight delays and difficulty in receiving compensation has been the major cause of inconvenience according to customers.

In March 2022 Pegasus announced that Güliz Öztürk would become chief executive officer with effect from 1 May 2022, succeeding Mehmet T. Nane, who became vice-chairperson of the board; Öztürk was the first woman to serve as CEO of an airline in Turkish civil aviation. Esas Holding has remained the airline's controlling shareholder since the flotation; H. Çağatay Özdoğru, Esas Holding's chief executive, served as vice-chairman of the Pegasus board from December 2006 to September 2022 and rejoined the board in August 2023.

Pegasus Airlines continues to operate flights to Russia despite its invasion of Ukraine and the resulting international sanctions. While most Western airlines have ceased operations in or over Russian airspace, Pegasus maintains its routes, aligning with Turkey’s close diplomatic and economic ties to Moscow. This includes contributing to government-backed efforts to support Russian tourism by allocating significant resources, such as 500,000 seats, for Russian passengers.

In December 2025, it was announced Pegasus had signed an agreement to acquire Smartwings and its parent company Czech Airlines in a deal worth €154 million.

== Corporate affairs ==
=== Business trends ===
The key trends for Pegasus Airlines are (as of the financial year ending 31 December):

	Net profit (US$ m)	Number of employees	Number of passengers (m)	Passenger load factor (%)	Fleet size	References
2015	38.0	4,967	22.3	79.0	67	
2016	−38.5	5,257	24.1	78.6	82	
2017	131	5,337	27.8	84.6	76	
2018	94.9	5,621	29.9	85.5	82	
2019	224	6,164	29.8	86.0	84	
2020	−264	6,130	14.7	79.7	93	
2021	−148	5,837	20.1	77.3	90	
2022	379	6,765	26.9	83.6	96	
2023	710	7,670	31.9	84.8	110	
2024	375	8,459	37.4	87.7	118	

=== Cabin ===
Pegasus Airlines operates a one-class interior configuration on all of its aircraft. A "Flying Cafe" is available to all passengers, whereby food and beverages are provided for an additional charge. Pegasus is also considering installing in-flight entertainment and charging for headphones (currently, only overhead screens are available on selected 737-800s, and they only display a computer-generated map showing the flight's progress). All new Boeing 737-800s which arrived after November 2011 have Boeing Sky Interior.

=== Training and maintenance ===
Unlike most low-cost carriers, Pegasus runs its own flight crew training centre and maintenance organisation, Pegasus Technic. Both centres are fully licensed and are used to train new staff members both on the ground and in the air.

=== Sponsorships ===
Pegasus Airlines was one of the official sponsors of Nef Stadium, the stadium of Turkish Football Club Galatasaray S.K. from 2011 to 2013.

== Destinations ==
Countries in which Pegasus operates (March 2026)

As of July 2024, Pegasus operated flights to 148 destinations in 53 countries across Europe, Asia and North Africa.

=== Codeshare agreements ===
Pegasus Airlines has codeshare agreements with the following airlines:

- Delta Air Lines
- Flynas
- Iberia
- ITA Airways
- KLM
- Nile Air
- Qatar Airways
- AirAsia

=== Interline agreements ===
Pegasus Airlines has interline agreements with the following airlines:

- Air Canada
- Air Transat
- Emirates
- Norse Atlantic Airways

== Fleet ==
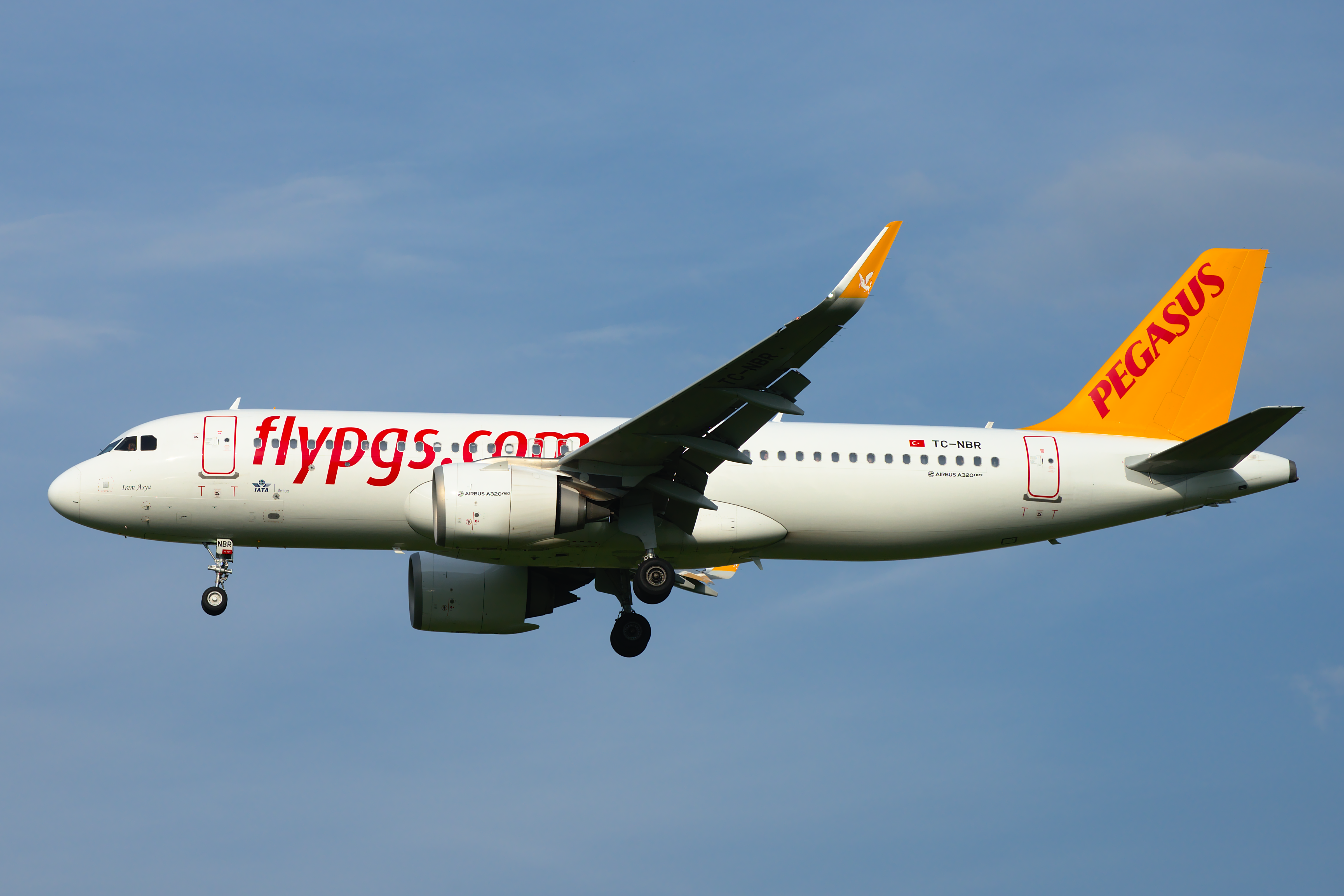
Pegasus Airlines Airbus A320neo

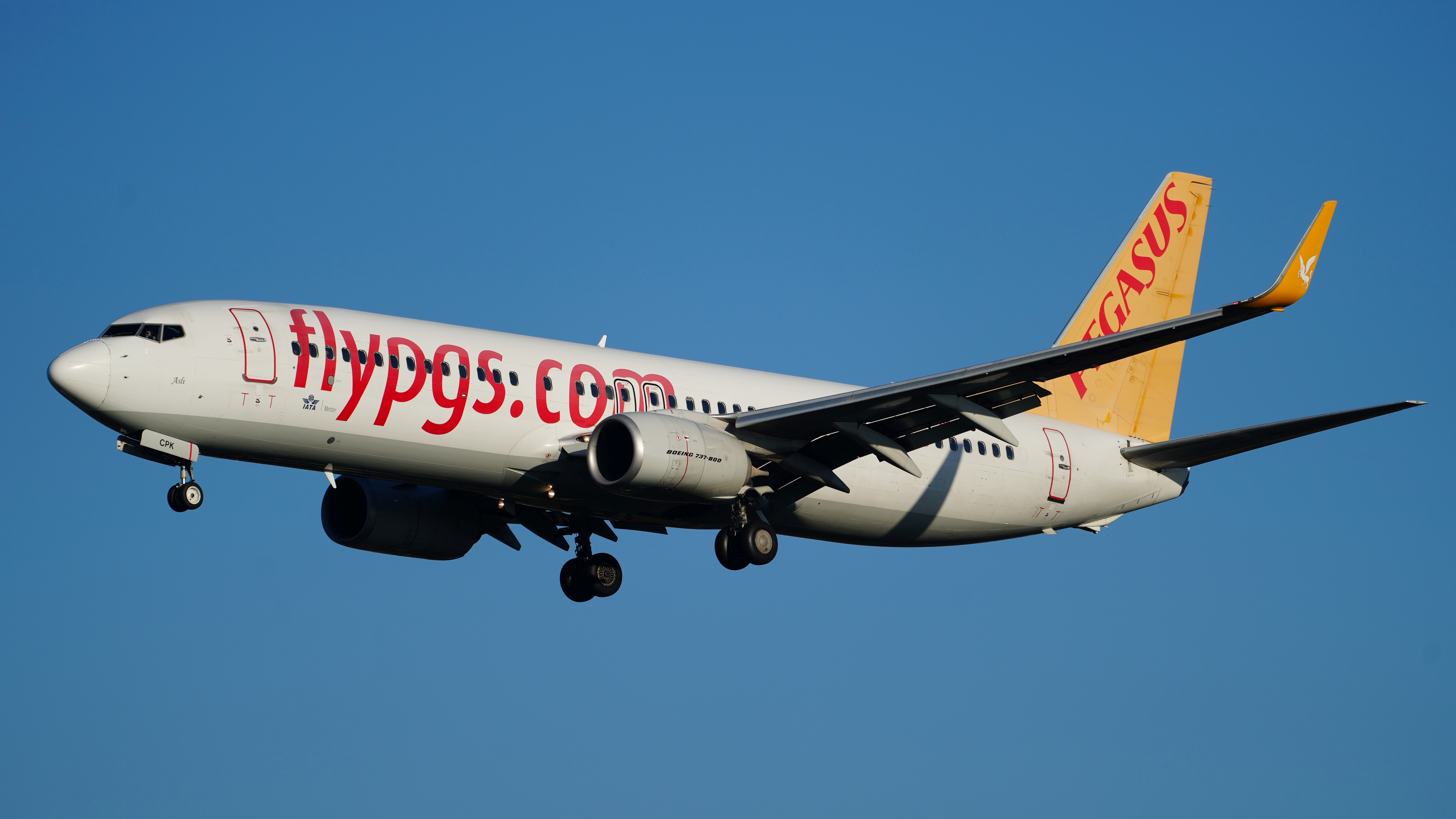
Pegasus Airlines Boeing 737-800

=== Current fleet ===
As of August 2025, Pegasus Airlines operates the following aircraft:

Pegasus Airlines fleet
Aircraft	In service	Orders	Passengers	Notes
Airbus A320-200	9	—	180	All aircraft to be phased out.
Airbus A320neo	46	—	186	
Airbus A321neo	65	44	239	
Boeing 737-800	9	—	189	All aircraft to be phased out.
Boeing 737 MAX 10	—	100	TBA	Order with 100 options.
Total	129	144		

=== Former fleet ===
Pegasus Airlines formerly also operated the following aircraft types:

Former Pegasus Airlines fleet
Aircraft	Total	Introduced	Retired	Notes
Airbus A300B4-200	2	1996	1997	
Boeing 737-300	1	2008	2009	Leased from Corendon Airlines.
Boeing 737-400	16	1990	2013	
Boeing 737-500	3	2006	2011	

== Incidents and accidents ==
- On 10 March 2010, Pegasus Airlines Flight 361, an Airbus A319 operated by IZair on a ferry flight, made an emergency landing at Frankfurt Airport, Germany after a malfunction in the nose gear. The flight landed safely but blew both front nose gear tires. The airport closed runway 07R/25L for 3 hours to allow recovery. The nose gear suffered the same problem as JetBlue Flight 292.
- On 7 February 2014, Pegasus Airlines Flight 751, a Boeing 737, was the victim of an attempted hijacking by Ukrainian passenger Artem Kozlov who claimed he had a bomb on board. The passenger demanded to be flown to Sochi, the host city of the 2014 Winter Olympics, where the Opening Ceremony was taking place. The plane landed safely in Istanbul.
- On 13 January 2018, Pegasus Airlines Flight 8622, a Boeing 737-800 (registration TC-CPF) from Ankara Esenboğa Airport, Ankara to Trabzon Airport, veered off the wet runway at Trabzon, slid into the ground of an acutely angled cliff, and got stuck in the mud, which prevented the 41-tonne fuselage from skidding into the Black Sea. All 168 people on board survived and there were no reported injuries. The aircraft sustained substantial damage.
- On 7 January 2020, Pegasus Airlines Flight 747, a Boeing 737-800 (registration TC-CCK), overran the runway on landing at Istanbul Sabiha Gökçen International Airport (IATA: SAW) causing substantial damage to the aircraft. All 164 people on board evacuated via slides. There were no injuries, and the aircraft was repaired.
- On 5 February 2020, Pegasus Airlines Flight 2193, a Boeing 737-800 (registration TC-IZK), overran the runway on landing at Istanbul Sabiha Gökçen International Airport (IATA: SAW). The fuselage broke into three segments and an engine caught fire. Three passengers were killed and 179 occupants were injured.
- On 26 January 2021, Pegasus Airlines Flight 939, an Airbus A320-251N, touched down on runway 15 at Basel Mulhouse-Freiburg EuroAirport with the nose landing gear rotated 90 degrees. The nosegear tyres ruptured as a result of the friction.

== See also ==
- Air Manas
- AJet
