= Pyrogi =

Pyrogi: Πυρόι (Greek); Gaziler (Turkish)
- Location in Cyprus
- Coordinates: 35°4′39″N 33°29′29″E
- Country (de jure): Cyprus
  - District: Nicosia District
- Country (de facto): Northern Cyprus
  - District: Lefkoşa District
- Time zone: UTC+2 (EET)
  - Summer (DST): UTC+3 (EEST)

Pyrogi (Greek: Πυρόι; Turkish: Gaziler) is a village in the Nicosia District of Cyprus, located south of Tymbou. It is under de facto control of Northern Cyprus. Today it is largely uninhabited, as the village lies within military area and can only be visited with permission of the Turkish military. In 1960 the village had 460 inhabitants. One kilometre northwest of the town lies the also uninhabited former village of Margo.
