= Ercan International Airport =

Airport in Northern Cyprus

Ercan International Airport Ercan Uluslararası Havalimanı Αεροδρόμιο Τύμπου
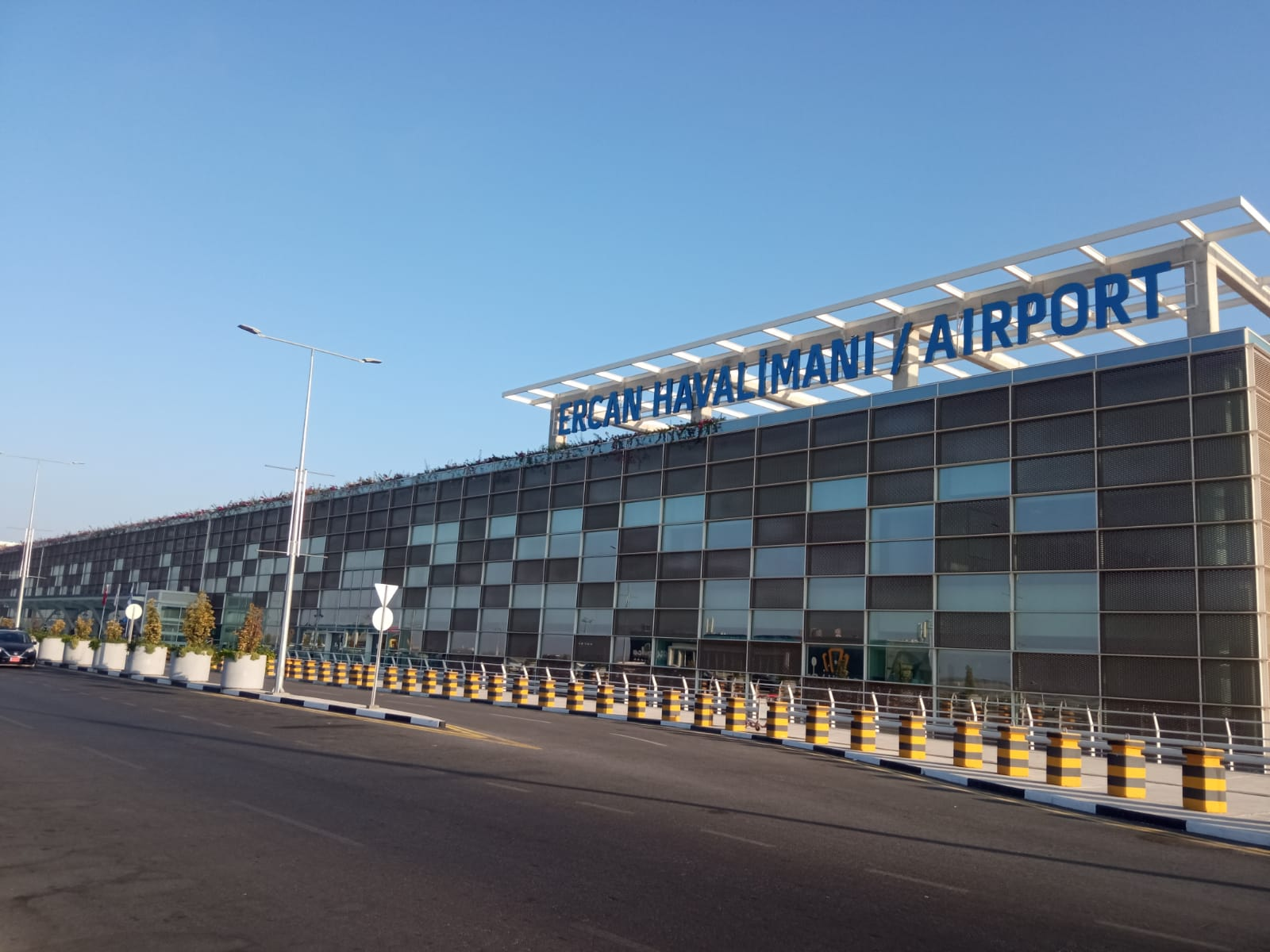
- IATA: ECN; ICAO: LCEN

Summary
- Airport type: Private
- Owner/Operator: T&T Ercan Airport
- Serves: Northern Cyprus
- Location: Kırklar
- Hub for: Fly Kıbrıs Airlines
- Operating base for: Pegasus Airlines
- Elevation AMSL: 403 ft (123 m)
- Coordinates: 35°09′35″N 33°30′00″E
- Website: www.ercanairport.aero

Map
- Location within Cyprus Location within Europe

Runways
Direction	Length		Surface
Direction	ft	m	Surface
11/29	10,499	3,200	Asphalt

Statistics (2023)
- Yearly Passengers: 3,990,324 ▲30.9%
- Aircraft movements: 26,697 ▲18.6%
- Cargo (kg): 1,104,907 ▲15.2%
- Source: Civil Aviation Authority

Ercan International Airport (IATA: ECN, ICAO: LCEN) is the primary civilian airport of Northern Cyprus. It is located about 13 kilometres (8 miles) east of Nicosia, near the village of Kırklar. The airport only serves flights to and from Turkey.

Despite a lack of direct flights to destinations other than Turkey, the airport is the second busiest on the island, with a record 4,842,134 passengers travelling through it in 2024.

== History ==
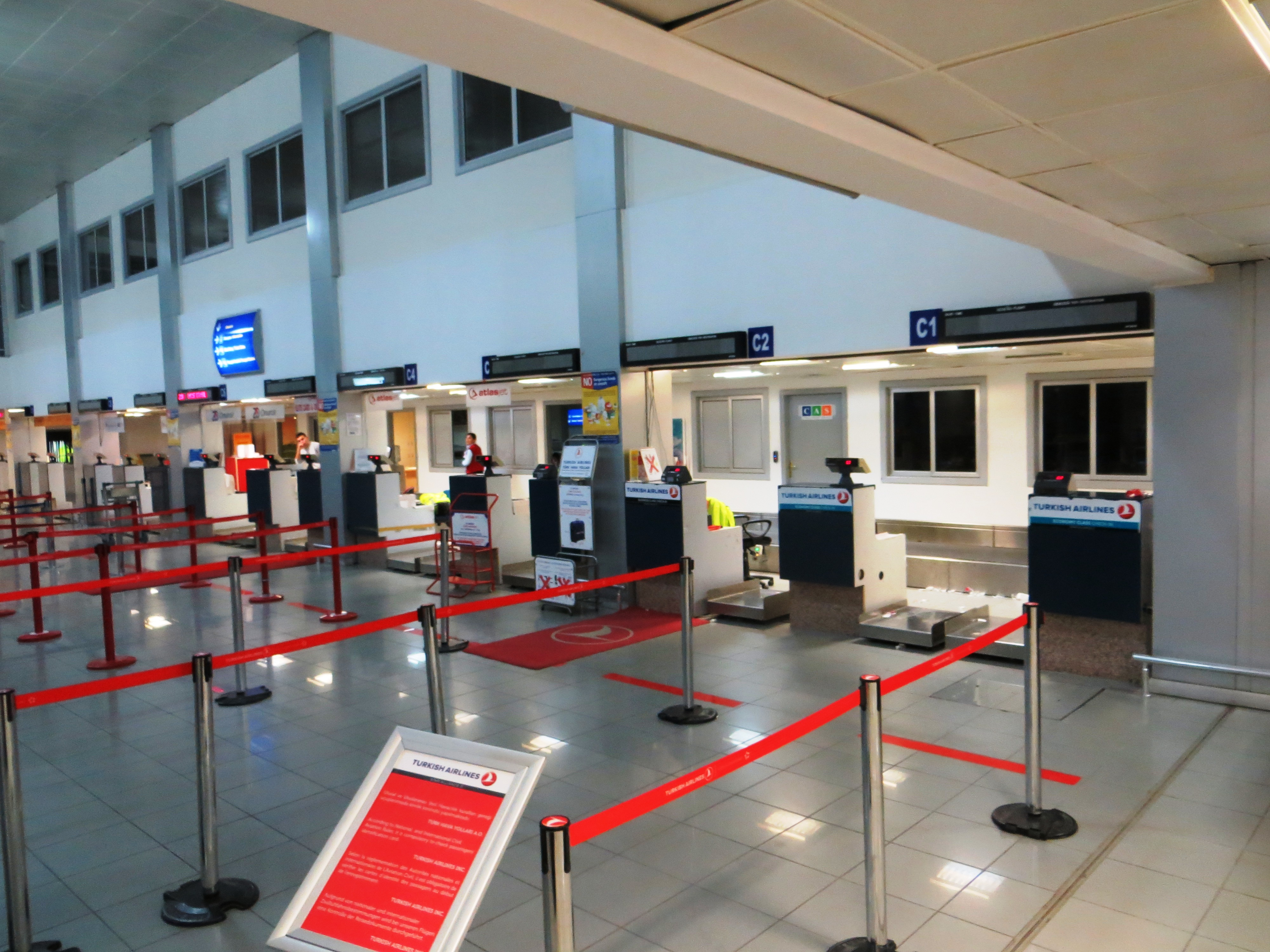
Check-in area at the old terminal

The precursor of Ercan Airport, Tymbou Airport, was constructed by the British in World War II as a military airport, during their colonial rule of the island. Following the Turkish invasion of 1974 and the partition of the island, it was taken over by the Turkish army, and today is used as the main civilian airport of Northern Cyprus. It is named after Fehmi Ercan.

Since 2006, the rule which stipulates that flights are required to touch down at a Turkish airport before continuing to and from Ercan has been under discussion. In 2006, the Turkish government began discussions for Northern Cyprus' main port of Famagusta, and main civilian airport Ercan, to be able to operate direct connections, with the UK government describing it as a "significant and creative offer".

However, as of 2024, the rule still applies, and Ercan airport has seen a decrease in customers, as a result of new tight security measures imposed by the UK Department for Transport questioning the status of the airport and forcing passengers travelling between Britain and Northern Cyprus to disembark with their luggage and go through a fresh security check in Turkey in order to board a new aircraft for their final destination.

Construction began on a new terminal in 2016, with completion originally set for 2018. The new terminal was eventually opened in July 2023, boasting a new runway of 3,100 m (10,200 ft) compared to the old runway of 2,755 m (9,039 ft), enabling the introduction of wide-body planes to Ercan. The new airport terminal is six times the size of the old one and has been designed for up to 10 million passengers per year.

== Airlines and destinations ==
=== International status ===
Flights to and from the airport are banned internationally due to the ongoing Cyprus dispute. Non-stop flights only take place from Turkey, and all planes that fly to Northern Cyprus from other countries have to stop over in Turkey. Because of these difficulties and inconveniences, the majority of Turkish Cypriots with Republic of Cyprus citizenship prefer to travel through Larnaca and Paphos airports, which are located in territory under the control of the internationally recognised government of the Republic of Cyprus; this option is not available, however, to Turkish citizens. Nonetheless, several Turkish airlines operate direct flights from Ercan to Europe with intermediate stops in Turkey via some of the destinations listed below. The Government of the Republic of Cyprus considers the use of Ercan Airport to enter or exit the island illegal, and could result in facing criminal charges when entering (or exiting) the Republic.

=== Overview ===
Airlines	Destinations
AJet	Adana/Mersin, Ankara, Antalya, Gaziantep, Istanbul–Sabiha Gökçen, İzmir, Trabzon
Pegasus Airlines	Adana/Mersin, Ankara, Antalya, Gaziantep, Hatay, Istanbul, Istanbul–Sabiha Gökçen, İzmir, Kayseri, Trabzon
SunExpress	İzmir
Turkish Airlines	Antalya, Istanbul

== See also ==
- Embargo against Northern Cyprus
