= Districts of Northern Cyprus =

Districts of Northern Cyprus Kuzey Kıbrıs'ın ilçeleri (Turkish)
- Category: Unitary state
- Location: Turkish Republic of Northern Cyprus
- Number: 6 Districts
- Populations: 22.922 (Lefke); 173.143 (Lefkoşa)
- Areas: Not enough data
- Government: District government, National government
- Subdivisions: Sub-District

Northern Cyprus is divided into six districts, which are further divided into 12 sub-districts. Each district is governed by a Governor. On 27 December 2016, the Assembly of the Republic unanimously decided that the Lefke sub-district would be separated from the Güzelyurt District, establishing the Lefke District as the sixth district of Northern Cyprus.

District	Sub-districts	Capital	Population (2024)	Land area	Population density	Governor	District map
Gazimağusa	Mağusa Sub-district; Akdoğan Sub-district; Geçitkale Sub-district	Famagusta	95.406	997	95,69	Beran Bertuğ	
Girne	Girne Sub-district; Çamlıbel Sub-district	Kyrenia	99.102	690	143,63	Mehmet Envergil	
Güzelyurt	Güzelyurt Sub-district	Morphou	36.025	219	164,50	Menteş Gündüz	
İskele	İskele Sub-district; Mehmetçik Sub-district; Yeni Erenköy Sub-district	Trikomo	46.402	774	59,95	Bünyamin Merhametsiz	
Lefke	Lefke Sub-district	Lefka	22.922	162	141,49	Sadi Güneş	
Lefkoşa	Lefkoşa Sub-district; Değirmenlik Sub-district	North Nicosia	173.143	513	337,51	Kemal Deniz Dana	

== See also ==
- Districts of Cyprus
- List of populated places in Northern Cyprus
- List of uninhabited villages in Northern Cyprus
- List of cities, towns and villages in Cyprus
