= List of Boeing 727 operators =

The list of Boeing 727 operators lists both former and current operators of the aircraft.

== Original commercial operators ==
List of operators who purchased or leased aircraft new:

Airline	Country	Photo	100	200	Notes
Aeroperú	Peru		8	9	
Aerolíneas Argentinas	Argentina		1	19	
Air Algérie	Algeria		2	12	
Air America	United States		1		
Air Canada	Canada			39	
Air Charter International	France			11	
Air France	France			29	
Air Jamaica	Jamaica		1	11	
Air Vietnam	South Vietnam		2		
Airlift International	United States		5		
Alaska Airlines	United States		32	29	
Alia Royal Jordanian Airlines	Jordan			7	
Alitalia	Italy			18	
All Nippon Airways	Japan		13	33	
Allegheny Airlines	United States		10	4	Rebranded as USAir in 1979
American Airlines	United States		59	125	
American Flyers Airline	United States		3		
Angola Air Charter	Angola		8		
Ansett Australia	Australia		6	19	Ceased operations in 2002
Ariana Afghan Airlines	Afghanistan		9	3	
Avensa	Venezuela		11	13	
Avianca	Colombia		33	18	
Braniff International Airways	United States		48	79	Ceased operations in 1982
British West Indian Airways	Trinidad and Tobago		4		
Canadian Pacific Air Lines	Canada		4	2	
China Airlines	Taiwan		4		
Condor	Germany		7	8	
Continental Airlines	United States		26	109	
Cruzeiro do Sul	Brazil		2		
Delta Air Lines	United States		8	183	
Dominicana de Aviación	Dominican Republic		5	9	Ceased operations in 1999
Eastern Air Lines	United States		75	99	Launch customer of 727-100
Ethiopian Airlines	Ethiopia			4	
Faucett Perú	Peru		5	3	
FedEx Express	United States		83	60	
Frontier Airlines	United States		7	3	
Hapag-Lloyd Flug	Germany		8	3	
Hughes Airwest	United States		3	11	
Iberia	Spain		2	48	
Icelandair	Iceland		5	2	
Iran Air	Iran		6	3	
Iraqi Airways	Iraq			12	
Japan Airlines	Japan		23		
Japan Domestic Airlines	Japan		2		
JAT Yugoslav Airlines	Yugoslavia		2	18	
Kuwait Airways	Kuwait			4	
LACSA	Costa Rica		3	5	
LAN-Chile	Chile		5		
Libyan Arab Airlines	Libya			15	
Lloyd Aéreo Boliviano	Bolivia		3	4	Ceased operations in 2010
Lufthansa	Germany		27	30	
Mexicana de Aviación	Mexico		17	51	
National Airlines	United States		21	27	Merged with Pan Am in 1980
Nigeria Airways	Nigeria		1	4	
Northeast Airlines	United States		8	13	Merged with Delta Air Lines in 1972
Northwest Airlines	United States		36	82	Launch customer of 727-200
Olympic Airways	Greece		2	10	
Ozark Air Lines	United States			2	Never used and sold to Pan Am
Pacific Air Lines	United States		6		Became Air West in 1968
Pacific Southwest Airlines	United States		16	33	
Pan American World Airways	United States		46	105	Ceased operations in 1991
Republic Airlines	United States			22	Merged with Northwest Airlines in 1986
Royal Air Maroc	Morocco			9	
PLUNA	Uruguay		3		
Sabena	Belgium		6	1	
Singapore Airlines	Singapore			6	
Sterling Airways	Denmark			28	
Southwest Airlines	United States			6	Leased from Braniff International and People Express Airlines
South African Airways	South Africa		9		
Syrian Air	Syria		3		
TAAG Angola Airlines	Angola		1		
TAP Air Portugal	Portugal		9	8	Included aircraft operated by wholly owned subsidiary Air Atlantis
Transair Sweden	Sweden		4		
Trans Australia Airlines	Australia		7	15	
Trans Caribbean Airways	United States		3	2	Acquired by American Airlines in 1971
Trans International Airlines	United States		2		
Trans World Airlines	United States		35	61	
Tunisair	Tunisia		1	20	
Turkish Airlines	Turkey			12	
United Airlines	United States		126	104	
Varig	Brazil		11		
VASP	Brazil		2	13	Ceased operations in 2005
Wardair Canada	Canada		1		
Western Airlines	United States			48	Merged with Delta Air Lines in 1987
World Airways	United States		12	3	
Yemen Airways	Yemen		3	9	

== Other commercial operators ==
List of operators who purchased or leased aircraft second-hand:

Airline	Country	Photo	100	200	Notes
ACES Colombia	Colombia		12	7	Ceased operations in 2003
Aero Costa Rica	Costa Rica		1	3	Ceased operations in 1997
Aero República	Colombia		3		
Aerocar Colombia	Colombia		1	1	Ceased operations in 1995
AeroGal	Ecuador			2	
AeroLatin	Venezuela		1		Ceased operations in 2000
Aerolíneas Internacionales	Mexico		2	6	Ceased operations in 2003
Aerolíneas Latinas	Venezuela		4		Renamed to AeroLatin in 1995
Aeropostal Alas de Venezuela	Venezuela			8	
Aerosucre	Colombia		4	5	2 aircraft are still in service
AeroSur	Bolivia		7	13	Ceased operations in 2012
Aerotal	Colombia		6		Ceased operations in 1983
African Express Airways	Kenya			2	
Air 1	United States		9	3	Ceased operations in 1985
Air Alfa	Turkey			2	
Air Atlanta	United States		5		
Air Class Líneas Aéreas	Uruguay			2	2 aircraft are still in service
Air Commerce	Yugoslavia			2	Leased from JAT Yugoslav Airlines
Air Dream	Cambodia			1	Ceased operations in 2007
Air Florida	United States		2	5	
Air Gemini	Angola		8	1	
Air Holland	Netherlands			3	
Air Horizon	Togo		1		Ceased operations in 2007
Air Libya	Libya			2	
Air Macau	Macau			3	
Air Malta	Malta		3	7	
Air Micronesia	Guam		10	5	Renamed to Continental Micronesia in 1989
Air National	United States			1	Ceased operations in 1984
Air Nauru	Nauru		3		
Air Niagara	United States		3		Ceased operations in 1984
Air Panamá Internacional	Panama		8	2	Ceased operations in 1990
Air Vanuatu	Vanuatu			1	
Al Rais Cargo	United Arab Emirates			2	Ceased operations in 2008
Albatros Airlines	Turkey			1	Ceased operations in 1996
Allied Air	Nigeria			3	
American Trans Air	United States		15	28	
Amerijet International	United States		11	22	
Angola Air Charter	Angola		10		
Asian Express Airlines	Australia			2	Renamed to Tasman Cargo Airlines in 2008
Associated Aviation	Nigeria			1	
Astar Air Cargo	United States		2	9	Ceased operations in 2012
ATA Brasil	Brazil			1	Ceased operations in 2006
Av Atlantic	United States		1	5	Ceased operations in 1996
Avesca Colombia	Colombia		2		Ceased operations in 1995
Aviogenex	Yugoslavia			17	
Azerbaijan Airlines	Azerbaijan			4	
Bahamas Express	United States		1		Rebranded as Majestic Air in 1988
Balkh Airlines	Afghanistan		1		
Birgenair	Turkey			1	Leased from Yemen Airways
Boğaziçi Hava Taşımacılığı	Turkey			2	Ceased operations in 1989
Bosphorus Airways	Turkey			2	Ceased operations in 1993
Boston-Maine Airways	United States			3	Ceased operations in 2008
Braniff (1983-1990)	United States			34	Ceased operations in 1989
Braniff (1991-1992)	United States		2	11	Ceased operations in 1992
Capital Cargo International Airlines	United States			15	Merged with Air Transport International in 2013
Carnival Air Lines	United States		1	10	Merged with Pan Am (1996-1998) in 1998
Cayman Airways	Cayman Islands		2	3	
Chanchangi Airlines	Nigeria			8	
Challenge Air Cargo	United States		1		Leased from Air Panamá Internacional
Champion Air	United States		2	22	Ceased operations in 2008
Comair	South Africa			5	Operated for British Airways
Compagnie Africaine d'Aviation	DRC			1	
Continental Micronesia	Guam		1	16	
Cosmos Air Cargo	Colombia		1		
Custom Air Transport	United States			8	Ceased operations in 2012
Cyprus Turkish Airlines	Northern Cyprus			4	
Dan-Air	United Kingdom		19	19	Merged with British Airways in 1992
DHL Airways	United States		11	9	Rebraded as Astar Air Cargo in 2003
DHL Aero Expreso	Panama			2	
DHL de Guatemala	Guatemala		1		
Emery Worldwide Airlines	United States		42	12	
Emirates	United Arab Emirates			3	
European Air Transport	Belgium		7	10	
Evergreen International Airlines	United States		35		
Express One International	United States		29	53	
Falcon Air Express	United States			14	
First Air	Canada		5	4	
Fly Linhas Aéreas	Brazil			2	Ceased operations in 2003
Frontier Horizon	United States		7		
Germania	Germany		2		
Gulf Air Transport	United States		9	3	
HeavyLift Cargo Airlines	Australia		4	3	
Hewa Bora Airways	DRC		4	6	
Hinduja Cargo Services	India			4	Ceased operations in 2001
Holiday Airlines	Turkey			1	Ceased operations in 1996
IFL Group	United States		3		3 aircraft are still in service
Imperial Air Cargo	South Africa			3	Ceased operations in 2014
Indonesian Airlines	Indonesia			1	Ceased operations in 2007
Intercontinental de Aviación	Colombia		1		
Interstate Airlines	United States		13		Ceased operations 1988
Iran Aseman Airlines	Iran			10	Last commercial operator
Ishtar Airlines	Iraq			1	Operated by African Express Airways
Isleña Colombia	Colombia		1	3	Ceased operations in 1994
İstanbul Airlines	Turkey			11	Ceased operations in 2000
Itapemirim Transportes Aéreos	Brazil		4	2	Ceased operations in 2000
Jatayu Airlines	Indonesia			8	
JD Valenciana de Aviación	Venezuela			2	Ceased operations in 1994
Jetair	Germany		2		Ceased operations in 1985
K-Mile Air	Thailand			3	
Kabo Air	Nigeria		7	8	
Kalitta Charters	United States		4	14	
Kam Air	Afghanistan		1	5	
Key Airlines	United States		18	4	Ceased operations in 1993
KF Cargo	Canada		14	29	
Kiwi International Air Lines	United States			22	Ceased operations in 1999
Korean Air	South Korea		5	12	
Ladeco	Chile		6	20	Merged with LAN-Chile in 1998
LASER Airlines	Venezuela			5	
Líneas Aéreas Suramericanas	Colombia		3	5	Ceased operations in 2023
Majestic Air	United States		1		Renamed to Carnival Air Lines in 1989
Mali Air Transport	Mali			1	Operated by the Government of Mali
Mandala Airlines	Indonesia			2	
McClain Airlines	United States		4		Ceased operations in 1987
MIAT Mongolian Airlines	Mongolia	Boeing 727-281-Adv, MIAT Mongolian Airlines AN0220939		3	The 727(s) were retired from service in 2003.
Megantara Air	Indonesia			1	Ceased operations in 2009
Merpati Nusantara Airlines	Indonesia			2	
MGM Grand Air	United States		3		Rebranded as Champion Air in 2008
Nationwide Airlines	South Africa			3	Ceased operations in 2008
Nesu Air	Turkey			1	Leased from Kuwait Airways
Noble Air	Turkey			5	
Northeastern International Airways	United States			5	
Okada Air	Nigeria			6	Ceased operations in 1997
Oman Air	Oman		1	1	
Orion Air	United States				
Pacific East Asia Cargo Airlines	Philippines		1	1	Ceased operations in 2010
Pacific Interstate Airlines	United States		1		Renamed to Pacific Inter Air in 1985
Pacific Inter Air	United States		1		Renamed to Bahamas Express in 1987
Pacific Western Airlines	Canada			2	
Palestinian Airlines	Palestine			1	
Pan American Airways (1998–2004)	United States			7	Ceased operations in 2004
Panagra Airways	United States			7	Ceased operations in 1999
Panavia	Panama		1	1	Ceased operations in 2006
Payam Air	Iran			2	
People Express Airlines	United States			46	Merged with Continental Airlines in 1987
Philippine Airlines	Philippines		2	2	
Phoenix Airways	South Africa		5	1	Ceased operations in 1995
Piedmont Airlines	United States		8	34	Merged with USAir in 1989
Planet Airways	United States		1	6	
Polynesian Airlines	Samoa			1	Leased from Ansett Australia
Ports of Call Travel Club	United States		1		
Premier Airlines	Australia		1	1	Renamed to Asian Express Airlines in 1996
Pride Air	United States		3	6	Ceased operations in 1985
Private Jet Expeditions	United States		1	3	
Qatar Airways	Qatar			6	
Quebecair	Canada		1		
Raya Airways	Malaysia			3	
Reeve Aleutian Airways	United States		2		
Regent Air	United States		3		
Rio Linhas Aéreas	Brazil			5	Ceased operations in 2017
Royal Brunei Airlines	Brunei			1	
Royal Khmer Airlines	Cambodia			1	Ceased operations in 2007
Royal Nepal Airlines	Nepal		5		
SAETA	Ecuador		2	3	Ceased operations in 2000
SAHSA	Honduras		2		
SAM Colombia	Colombia		14	6	
SAN Ecuador	Ecuador		2	1	Ceased operations in 1999
Santa Bárbara Airlines	Venezuela			2	
Scibe Airlift	Republic of the Congo		3		Ceased operations in 1998
Servivensa	Venezuela		3	1	Ceased operations in 2003
Sideral Linhas Aéreas	Brazil			2	Leased from Rio Linhas Aéreas
Silkway Business Aviation	Azerbaijan			1	
Skybus Airlines (1985)	United States		3	4	
SNAS Aviation	Saudi Arabia			5	Ceased operations in 2014
Sol Air	Honduras			2	Leased from Falcon Air Express
SonAir	Angola		1		
Sultan Air	Turkey			2	Ceased operations in 1993
Sun Country Airlines	United States			42	
TAESA Lineas Aéreas	Mexico		14	2	Ceased operations in 2000
TAF Linhas Aéreas	Brazil			5	Ceased operations in 2009
Talia Airways	Turkey			2	Ceased operations in 1988
TAME	Ecuador		3	6	
TAN Airlines	Honduras		1	1	
Tasman Cargo Airlines	Australia			1	
Tayfunair	Turkey			1	
Teebah Airlines	Jordan			1	Operated by Iraqi Airways
Trans Air Congo	Republic of the Congo		3	1	
TransAer International Airlines	Ireland			1	
Transafrik International	Angola		14		3 aircraft are still in service
Transbrasil	Brazil		22		
Transmile Air Services	Malaysia			17	Rebranded as Raya Airways in 2014
Tri-MG Intra Asia Airlines	Indonesia		1	1	
Trump Shuttle	United States		8	17	Acquired by US Airways Shuttle in 1992
Top Air	Turkey			4	
Toros Air	Turkey		1	1	Ceased operations in 1989
Total Linhas Aéreas	Brazil			6	5 aircraft are still in service
TUR European Airways	Turkey		4	4	Ceased operations in 1994
UltrAir	United States			8	Ceased operations in 1994
UniWorld Air Cargo	Panama			1	
UPS Airlines	United States		67	8	
US Airways	United States			7	
US Airways Shuttle	United States			12	
USAir	United States		12	64	Renamed to US Airways in 1995
Varig Logística	Brazil		2	4	Ceased operations in 2012
Viasa	Venezuela			7	Ceased operations in 1997
Vietnam Airlines	Vietnam			1	
Vensecar Internacional	Venezuela		3	3	
Western Pacific Airlines	United States			2	Leased from Express One International
Wien Air Alaska	United States		6	1	
Wimbi Dira Airways	DRC			1	
Zuliana de Aviación	Venezuela			2	
Sky Airline	Chile			1	only 727 used by the airline

== Government, military and other operators ==
As well as commercial operators the 727 has been used by military, government and private operators. The United States military used the 727 as a military transport, designated as the C-22.

Afghanistan

- Afghan Air Force

Angola

- Angolan Air Force

Belgium

- Belgian Air Force

Benin

- Military of Benin

Burkina Faso

- Burkina Faso Air Force

Cameroon

- Military of Cameroon

Colombia

- Colombian Aerospace Force
- Government of Colombia

Democratic Republic of the Congo

- Air Force of the Democratic Republic of the Congo

Ecuador

- Ecuadorian Air Force

Gambia

- Gambian National Guard

Iran

- Imperial Iranian Air Force

Mali

- Malian Air Force

Mexico

- Mexican Air Force
- Federal Preventive Police

New Zealand

- No. 40 Squadron RNZAF
- Royal New Zealand Air Force

Nigeria

- Nigerian Air Force

Panama

- Panamanian Air Force

Qatar

- Qatar Amiri Flight

Russia

- Government of Tatarstan

Saudi Arabia

- Saudia Royal Flight

Tajikistan

- Military of Tajikistan

United Kingdom

- Oil Spill Response

Yugoslavia

- SFR Yugoslav Air Force
