= List of defunct airlines of Iraq =

This is a list of defunct airlines of Iraq.

Airline	Image	IATA	ICAO	Callsign	Commenced operations	Ceased operations	Notes
Air Baghdad					2003	2007	
Al Naser Wings Airlines		NG	NAD	AL-NASER	2009	2019	
Azmar Airlines			JIB	AZMAR	2004	2007	
Bin Firnas Airlines					2006	2006	Failed project
FlyBaghdad		IF	FBA	IRAQ EXPRESS	2015	2016	
Fly Iraquna					2006	2008	Virtual carrier
Ishtar Airlines				ISHTAR	2005	2008	
Korek Airlines					2006	2006	
Kurdistan Airlines					2005	2010	
Magnolia Airlines					2008	2012	
Mesopotamia Air					2007	2008	
Sawan Airlines					2005	2006	
Tigris Air					2005	2009	
Zagrosjet		ZV	GZQ	ZAGROSJET	2005	2013	

== See also ==
- List of airlines of Iraq
