= List of airports in the Kurdistan Region =

List of airports under the jurisdiction of the Kurdistan Regional Government

The Kurdistan Region is a semi-autonomous federal region of Iraq, comprising the governorates of Erbil, Sulaymaniyah, Duhok, and Halabja. As of 2026, the region has two operational international airports, Erbil International Airport and Jalal Talabani International Airport (formerly Sulaymaniyah International Airport), both administered by the federal Iraqi Civil Aviation Authority (ICAA).

A third international airport in Duhok has been under construction since 2012, with repeated interruptions; as of 2025, its design was updated and phased construction was pending. The Bamarni Air Base (Bamarni Airport) in Duhok Governorate is a military airfield that also holds IATA and ICAO designators but does not serve commercial passengers.

== Airports ==
Airport	IATA	ICAO	Governorate	Type	Operator	Elevation	Runway	Status	Notes
Erbil International Airport	EBL	ORER	Erbil	International (civil/military)	Kurdistan Regional Government / ICAA	409 m (1,341 ft)	4,800 m × 75 m (15,748 ft × 246 ft)	Operational	Opened 29 April 2005; ICAO code assigned 26 May 2005. Busiest airport in the Kurdistan Region.
Jalal Talabani International Airport (formerly Sulaymaniyah International Airport)	ISU	ORSU (Note: The ICAO code for Jalal Talabani International Airport is listed as ORSU in the SKYbrary aviation safety database.)	Sulaymaniyah	International	Kurdistan Regional Government / ICAA	760 m (2,493 ft)	3,500 m × 45 m (11,483 ft × 148 ft)	Operational	Opened 20 July 2005. Renamed Jalal Talabani International Airport effective 19 March 2026.
Duhok International Airport	DHK	ORDD	Duhok	International (planned)	Kurdistan Regional Government (planned)	—	—	Under construction	Construction began September 2012; repeatedly halted. Design updated in 2023; phased construction pending.
Bamarni Air Base	BMN	ORBB	Duhok	Military air base	Iraqi Armed Forces (historically Turkish Armed Forces)	—	—	Military (non-commercial)	Located near Bamarni in Amadiya District. Formerly known as Sarsing Airport; bombed in 1991 and rebuilt. Turkish Armed Forces operated from the base beginning in 1996.

== See also ==
- List of airports in Iraq
- Iraqi Civil Aviation Authority
