= Tor Air =

Swedish charter airline (2008–2011)

IATA	ICAO	Call sign
OD	OAI	TORLINE
- Founded: 2008
- Commenced operations: December 2008
- Ceased operations: 20 December 2011
- Operating bases: Gothenburg-City; London-Gatwick
- Fleet size: 4
- Destinations: 32
- Headquarters: Gothenburg, Sweden
- Key people: Sven Roland Vinsell (Chairman); Torbjorn Vinsell (President)
- Website: www.torair.com

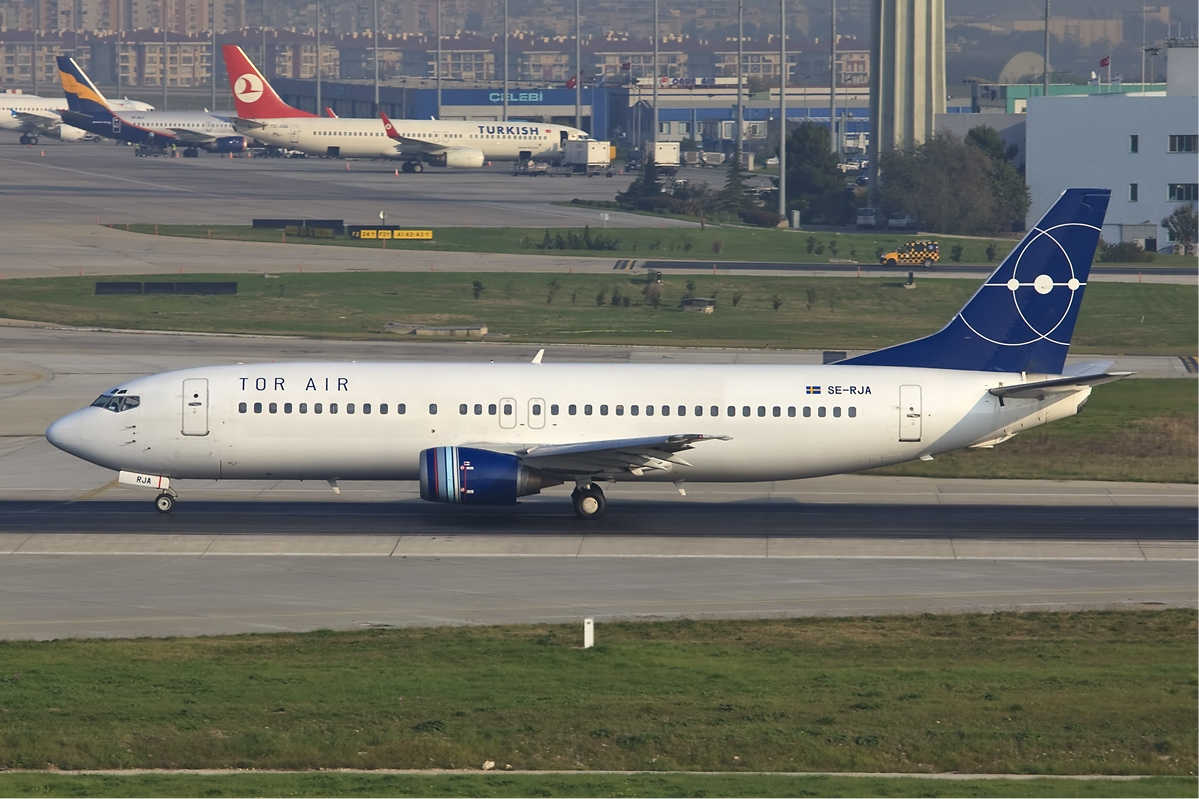
A Tor Air Boeing 737-400.

Tor Air AB, operated as Tor Air, was a charter airline based in Gothenburg, Sweden, that operated between December 2008 and December 2011. Its main base was Gothenburg City Airport. This airline should not be mixed up with another Swedish charter airline named Tor-Air, which operated from 1964 and 1966 with Curtiss Commando and Douglas DC-3 aircraft out of the former Gothenburg/Torslanda Airport.

== History ==
The company was established by private investors and received a Swedish Air Operators Certificate on 1 December 2008. It commenced operations in December 2008 with a Boeing 737-400 leased from International Lease Finance Corporation. The airline specialised in wet-lease and charter operations, particularly operating services for other carriers when needed. Tor Air later acquired two Boeing 737-300s to fly from Manchester to Preveza and Gothenburg, as well as London-Gatwick to destinations such as Faro, Skiathos, Bourgas, Sharm el-Sheikh, Zante, Kos, Corfu and Rhodes.

On 25 April 2010, Tor Air's Boeing 737-400 operated the first commercial service between Baghdad and London in 20 years, while on a wet lease to Iraqi Airways. It was a short lived service however as a lawyer for Kuwait tried to have the aircraft seized in London due to financial problems between Iraq and Kuwait, this was not possible though as the aircraft belonged to a Swedish company and not an Iraqi company.

=== Collapse ===
On 20 December 2011, Tor Air had its licence revoked by Sweden's transportation board, due to lack of sufficient financial resources. All staff were made redundant.

== Destinations ==
Tor Air operated charter flights, serving the following destinations (as of March 2011):

^{[Base]}	Base
^{[Seasonal]}	Seasonal service

City	Country	IATA	ICAO	Airport
Baghdad	Iraq	BGW	ORBI	Baghdad International Airport
Burgas	Bulgaria	BOJ	LBBG	Burgas Airport
Chania	Greece	CHQ	LGSA	Chania International Airport
Cologne/Bonn	Germany	CGN	EDDK	Cologne Bonn Airport ^{[Seasonal]}
Corfu	Greece	CFU	LGKR	Corfu International Airport
Dubrovnik	Croatia	DBV	LDDU	Dubrovnik Airport
Erbil	Iraq	EBL	ORER	Erbil International Airport
Faro	Portugal	FAO	LPFR	Faro Airport
Friedrichshafen	Germany	FDH	EDNY	Friedrichshafen Airport
Gothenburg	Sweden	GSE	ESGP	Gothenburg City Airport ^{[Base]}
Gothenburg	Sweden	GOT	ESGG	Göteborg Landvetter Airport
Heraklion	Greece	HER	LGIR	Heraklion International Airport
Kalamata	Greece	KLX	LGKL	Kalamata International Airport
Kefalonia	Greece	EFL	LGKF	Kefalonia Island International Airport
Kos	Greece	KGS	LGKO	Kos Island International Airport
Larnaca	Cyprus	LCA	LCLK	Larnaca International Airport
Lemnos	Greece	LXS	LGLM	Lemnos International Airport
London	United Kingdom	LGW	EGKK	Gatwick Airport ^{[Base]}
Malmö	Sweden	MMX	ESMS	Malmö Airport
Manchester	United Kingdom	MAN	EGCC	Manchester Airport
Paphos	Cyprus	PFO	LCPH	Paphos International Airport
Pula	Croatia	PUY	LDPL	Pula Airport
Preveza/Lefkada	Greece	PVK	LGPZ	Aktion National Airport
Rhodes	Greece	RHO	LGRP	Rhodes International Airport
Samos	Greece	SMI	LGSM	Samos International Airport
Santorini	Greece	JTR	LGSR	Santorini National Airport
Sharm el-Sheikh	Egypt	SSH	HESH	Sharm el-Sheikh International Airport
Skiathos	Greece	JSI	LGSK	Skiathos Island National Airport
Stockholm	Sweden	ARN	ESSA	Arlanda Airport
Sulaymaniyah	Iraq	ISU	ORSU	Sulaymaniyah International Airport
Tehran	Iran	IKA	OIIE	Imam Khomeini International Airport ^{[Seasonal]}
Thessaloniki	Greece	SKG	LGTS	Thessaloniki International Airport
Verona	Italy	VRN	LIPX	Verona Airport
Volos	Greece	VOL	LGBL	Nea Anchialos National Airport
Zakynthos	Greece	ZTH	LGZA	Zakynthos International Airport

== Fleet ==
The Tor Air fleet included the following aircraft in September 2011:

Tor Air Fleet
Aircraft	Total	Orders	Passengers (Business/Economy)	Notes
Airbus A320-212	1	0	177 (0/177)	Operated by BH Air
Boeing 737-300	2	0	148 (0/148)	Operated by Small Planet Airlines
Boeing 737-400	1	0	150 (12/138)	
Total	4	0		
