= List of airlines of Iraq =

This is a list of airlines currently operating in Iraq.

== Scheduled airlines ==
Airline	Image	IATA	ICAO	Callsign	Commenced operations	Notes
Al-Burhan Airways					2014	Helicopter Operator
Fly Baghdad		IF	FBA	FLY BAGHDAD	2015	
FlyErbil		HW	BAY	HAWLER	2018	
Iraqi Airways		IA	IAW	IRAQI	1945	
UR Airlines		UD	UBD	URAIR	2019	
Basra Airlines		BS	BSQ	BASRA	2026	

== See also ==
- List of defunct airlines of Iraq
- List of defunct airlines of Asia
- List of airlines
