= Korek =

Korek may refer to:

- Korek, Greater Poland Voivodeship
- Mount Korek, Iraq
- Korek Airlines
- Korek Telecom
- Korek (surname)
