= Basra Airlines =

Flight operator in Iraq

IATA	ICAO	Call sign
BH	BSQ	—
- Founded: 2022
- Commenced operations: 2025
- Fleet size: 2
- Headquarters: Baghdad, Iraq
- Website: www.basraairlines.com

Basra Airlines is an Iraqi airline founded in 2022. The airline began flight operations in 2025 after receiving its air operator certificate from Iraqi aviation authorities.

== History ==
Basra Airlines was founded in 2022 by Iraqi businessman and aviation entrepreneur Moffak Sabir Hamad.

During 2023 and 2024, the airline focused on regulatory preparation, aircraft sourcing, operational planning, and staff recruitment ahead of launch.

In October 2025, the airline received its first aircraft, a Bombardier CRJ1000 named Shatt Al-Arab, marking the operational launch of the carrier at Basra International Airport.

In December 2025, Basra Airlines obtained its Iraqi Air Operator Certificate (AOC) from the Iraqi Civil Aviation Authority, allowing the airline to begin commercial operations.

The airline launched its first scheduled domestic services in 2026, including flights between Basra and Erbil, with plans for international routes to Turkey and other regional destinations.

== Destinations ==
- Erbil
- Baghdad

== Fleet ==
=== Current fleet ===
As of July 2026, Basra Airlines operates the following aircraft:

Aircraft	In service	Orders	Notes
Bombardier CRJ1000	2	—	(YI-BBG, YI-BBF)
Total	2	—	
