= Korel =

Korel is a given name. Notable people with the name include:

- Korel Engin (born 1980), American-born Turkish basketball player
- Korel Tunador, American singer

== See also ==
- Korek (surname)
- Korey
