= Mesopotamia Air =

Airline based in Iraq

- Founded: 2006
- Commenced operations: 2007
- Ceased operations: 2008
- Operating bases: Sulaimaniyah International Airport
- Fleet size: 2
- Destinations: 4
- Headquarters: Sulaimaniyah, Kurdistan Region

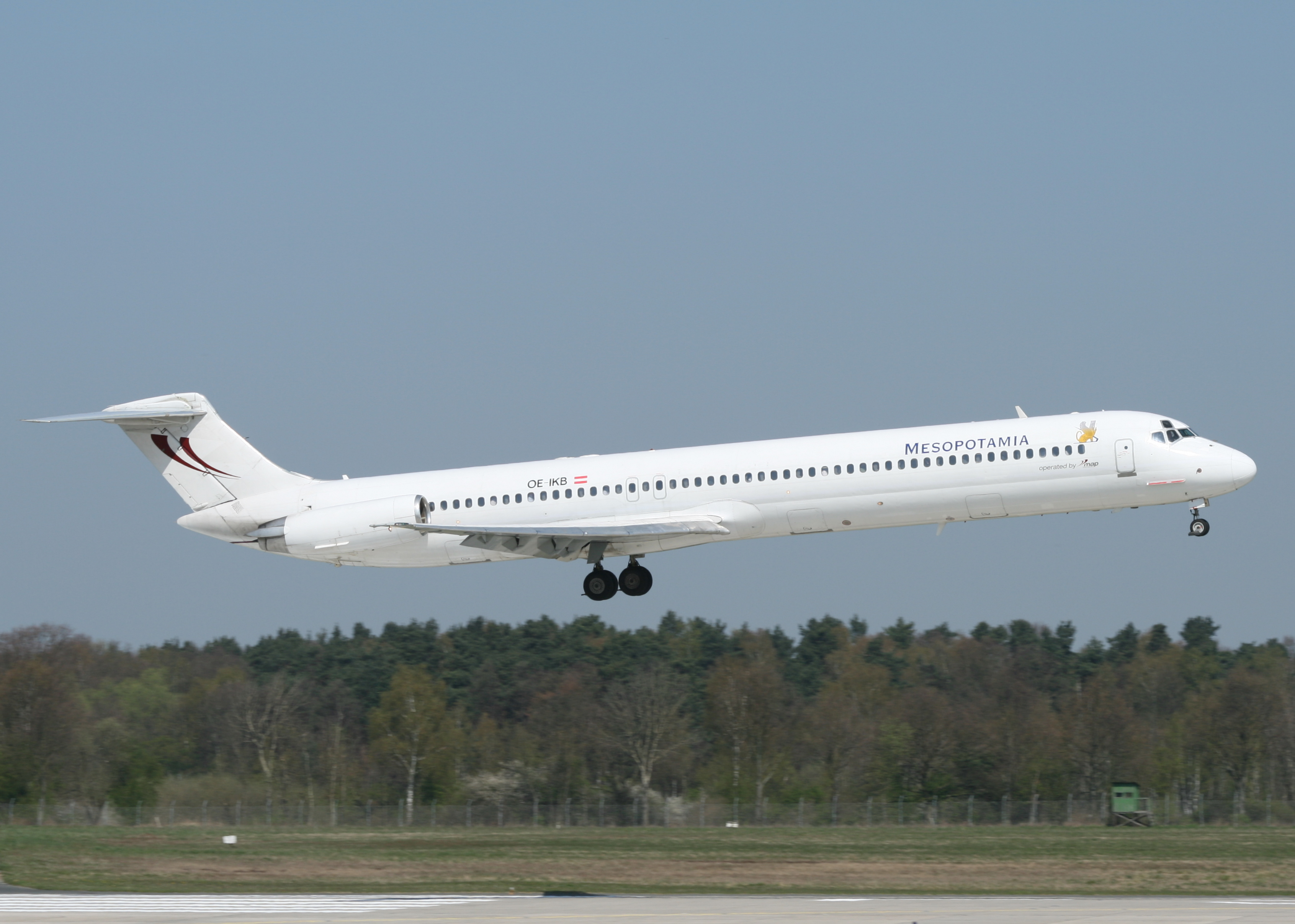
A Mesopotamia Air McDonnell Douglas MD-83 landing. (2008)

Mesopotamia Air or Mesopotamia Airlines was a short-lived airline based in Sulaimaniyah, Iraq, operating scheduled flights from Sulaimaniyah International Airport to Amsterdam, Frankfurt and London via Vienna. The Official General Sales Agent (GSA) in Germany was the Company Al-Iraqia Air Travel GmbH (Horus Air Travel & Cargo GmbH) located in Frankfurt/Main.

== Destinations ==
^{[Base]}	Base

City	Country	IATA	ICAO	Airport
Amsterdam	Netherlands	AMS	EHAM	Amsterdam Airport Schiphol
Frankfurt	Germany	FRA	EDDF	Frankfurt Airport
London	United Kingdom	LGW	EGKK	Gatwick Airport
Sulaimaniyah	Iraq	ISU	ORSU	Sulaimaniyah International Airport ^{[Base]}

== Fleet ==
The Mesopotamia Air fleet consisted of the following aircraft:

Mesopotamia Air Fleet
Aircraft	Total
BAe 146-200	1
McDonnell Douglas MD-83	1
Total	2
