= Azmar Airlines =

Iraqi charter airline

IATA	ICAO	Call sign
—	JIB	AZMAR
- Founded: 2005
- Ceased operations: 2017
- Hubs: Sulaymaniyah International Airport
- Fleet size: 3
- Destinations: 9
- Headquarters: Sulaymaniyah, Iraq
- Website: azmarairline.org (defunct, archived)

Azmar Airlines was a charter airline based in Sulaymaniyah, Kurdistan Region, Iraq. It was founded in 2005 and it appears to have gone out of business in 2017.

== Destinations ==
As of 2012, Azmar Airlines offered services to the following destinations:

Germany

- Düsseldorf - Düsseldorf Airport
- Munich - Munich Airport

Iraq

- Erbil - Erbil International Airport
- Sulaimaniyah - Sulaimaniyah International Airport base

Sweden

- Stockholm - Stockholm-Arlanda Airport

== Fleet ==
The Azmar Airlines fleet consisted of the following aircraft as of December 2013:

- 1 Boeing 737-200
- 2 McDonnell Douglas DC-9 (operated by Jet Tran Air)
