= Kurdistan Airlines =

Defcunt Emirati-Kurdish Airline

IATA	ICAO	Call sign
-	-	—
- Founded: 2004
- Ceased operations: 2010
- Hubs: Erbil International Airport
- Parent company: Commercial Office of Kurdistan Region Iraq (L.L.C)
- Headquarters: Dubai, UAE
- Key people: Yahya M. Ali (General Manager)
- Website: http://www.kurdistanairlines.tripod.com/

Kurdistan Airlines A.K.A Kurdish Airlines was an airline based in the United Arab Emirates.

== History ==
The first flight of Kurdistan Airlines (Commercial Office of Kurdistan Region Iraq (L.L.C)) landed in Erbil, Kurdistan Region, Iraq on July 21, 2005, at 10:30 am (0630 GMT) carrying 46 Iraqi businessmen from Dubai, UAE.

The establishment of Kurdistan Airlines was announced by a press release on 2 August 2005 by the Commercial Office of Kurdistan Region Iraq in Dubai, UAE.

On 7 August 2005 Dnata Agencies was appointed General Sales Agent (GSA) for Kurdistan Airlines in the Persian Gulf region.

The first Kurdistan Airlines revenue flight, flying from Frankfurt to Erbil arrived at Erbil airport at 6:30 a.m on September 20, 2005, with 40 passengers on board.

On July 14, 2006, it was reported that a Kurdistan Airlines aircraft was stranded in Rafic Hariri International Airport Beirut, Lebanon during the 2006 Lebanon War.

As of 2010, the airline had no aircraft and thus is now inactive.

== Headquarters ==
The company's headquarters were located at Warba Centre in Dubai, UAEDubai Chamber of Commerce & Industry

== Fleet ==
As of December 2010, Kurdistan Airlines had formerly owned one Boeing 737-200 aircraft, however it has since been re-registered with Imperial Jet, effectively rendering the airline inactive.
