= TUR European Airways =

Turkish charter airline (1988-1994)

IATA	ICAO	Call sign
YI	TCT	TURAVRUPA
- Founded: 1988
- Ceased operations: 1994

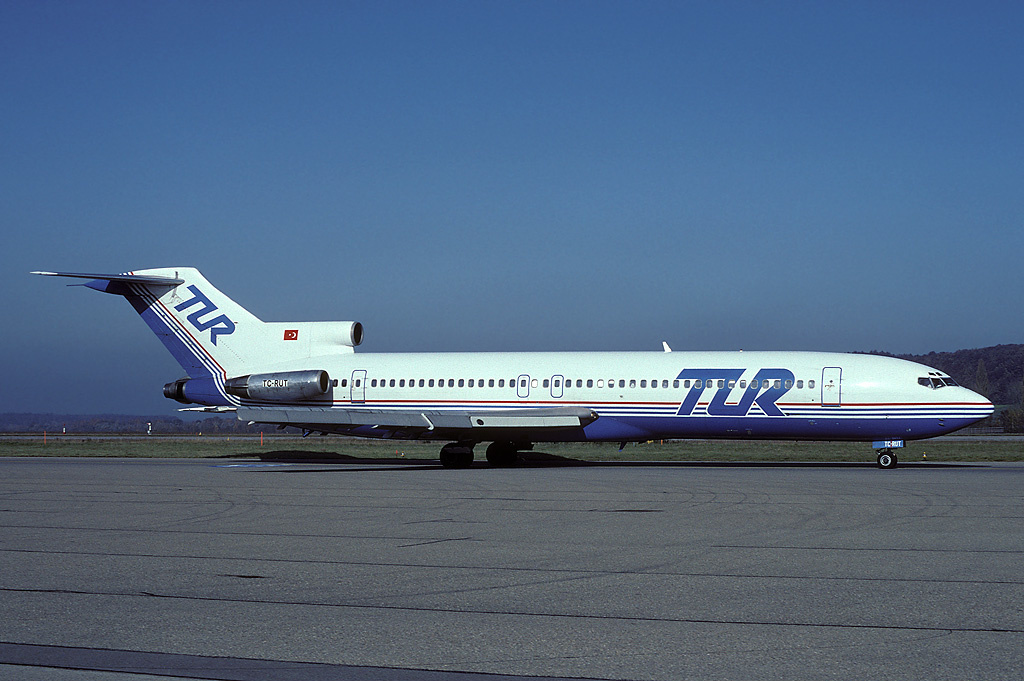
TUR European Airways Boeing 727-200 at Zurich International Airport, 1992

TUR European Airways was a charter airline from Turkey that operated from 1988 until 1994.

== History ==
TUR was set up in 1988 and began operations using two Boeing 727-200 for charter operations mostly from Germany flying German tourists and expatriate Turks to Turkey.

In the beginning things went pretty well due to a booming tourist market in Turkey, so much so that in 1991 a McDonnell Douglas MD-83 was added, followed by a second MD-83 a year later. With the additional aircraft, the charter routes were expanded to include Belgium, the United Kingdom, France, the Netherlands and other northern European countries. Since no other MD-83 were available to for lease, more B727-200s were acquired.

== Decline ==
In 1992 TUR entered the Turkish domestic market with flights from its base in Istanbul to Ankara, İzmir and other domestic destinations. The economic problems due to the Gulf War brought a decline in the tourist market and two B727s were sold and flights reduced. By 1993 the losses had mounted and as a result all scheduled flights were given up to concentrate on the charter business. But as losses continued, operations were suddenly halted in 1994 and the airline was liquidated.

== Fleet ==
- 1 Boeing 727-076
- 1 Boeing 737-2M8
- 2 McDonnell Douglas MD-83
- 4 Boeing 727-230 (all ex-Condor aircraft)
