= Ishtar Airlines =

IATA	ICAO	Call sign
—	—	ISHTAR
- Founded: 2005
- Ceased operations: 2009
- Operating bases: Baghdad International Airport; Dubai International Airport
- Fleet size: 1
- Destinations: 2
- Parent company: Ishtar Airlines Ltd
- Headquarters: Deira, Dubai, United Arab Emirates
- Key people: Moayad Hassan (President); Ramsey Shaban (Vice President)
- Website: www.ishtarair.com

Ishtar Airlines (Arabic: عشتار ايرلاينز) was an airline based in Dubai, United Arab Emirates, although it was a private Iraqi airline operating scheduled passenger services, its main bases were its only destinations, Baghdad International Airport and Dubai International Airport.

Ishtar Airlines headquarters was in Deira, Dubai, United Arab Emirates.

== History ==
The airline was established in March 2005 by a group of former Iraqi Airways pilots.

Ishtar Airlines operations went quiet in October 2009 and seems to have now ceased operations altogether.

== Destinations ==
Ishtar Airlines operated scheduled passenger services to the following destinations in July 2007:

Iraq

- Baghdad - Baghdad International Airport Base

United Arab Emirates

- Dubai - Dubai International Airport Base

It had planned to expand its operations to other destinations in Europe and the Middle East.

== Fleet ==
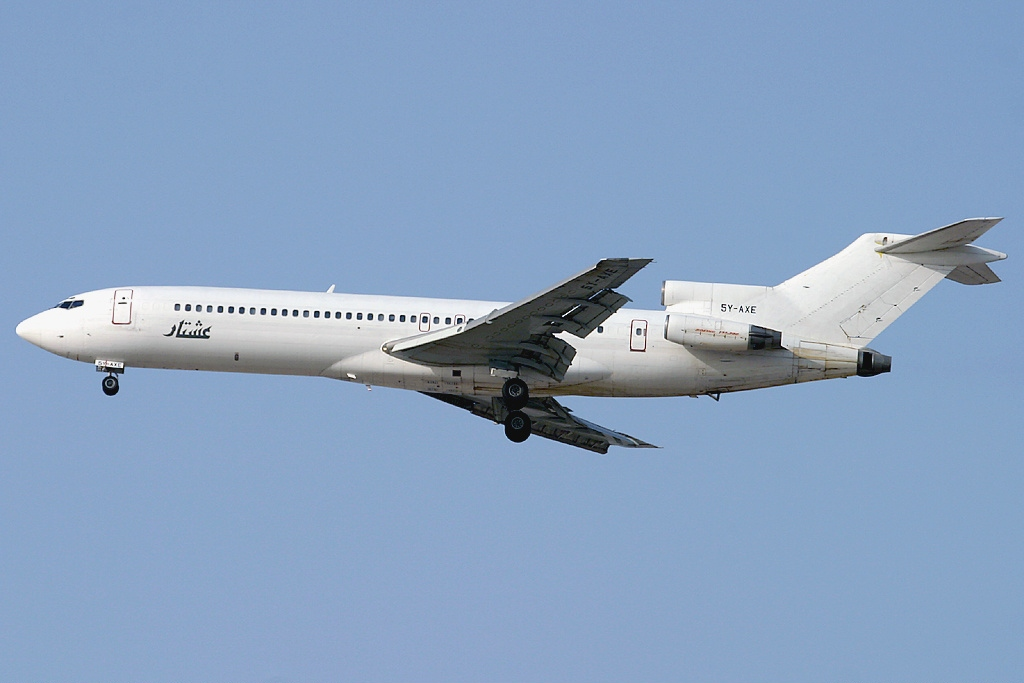
An Ishtar Airlines Boeing 727-200Adv landing at Dubai International Airport, United Arab Emirates. (2005)

The Ishtar Airlines fleet included the following aircraft in October 2009:

Ishtar Airlines Fleet
Aircraft	Total	Notes
Boeing 727-200Adv	1	Operated by African Express Airways

=== Former ===
Prior to ceasing operations, Ishtar Airlines previously operated the following aircraft:

Ishtar Airlines Previously Operated
Aircraft	Total	Notes
Boeing 737-200	2	1 leased from Dolphin Air; 1 sold to Iraqi Airways
