= Top Air =

Airline from Indonesia

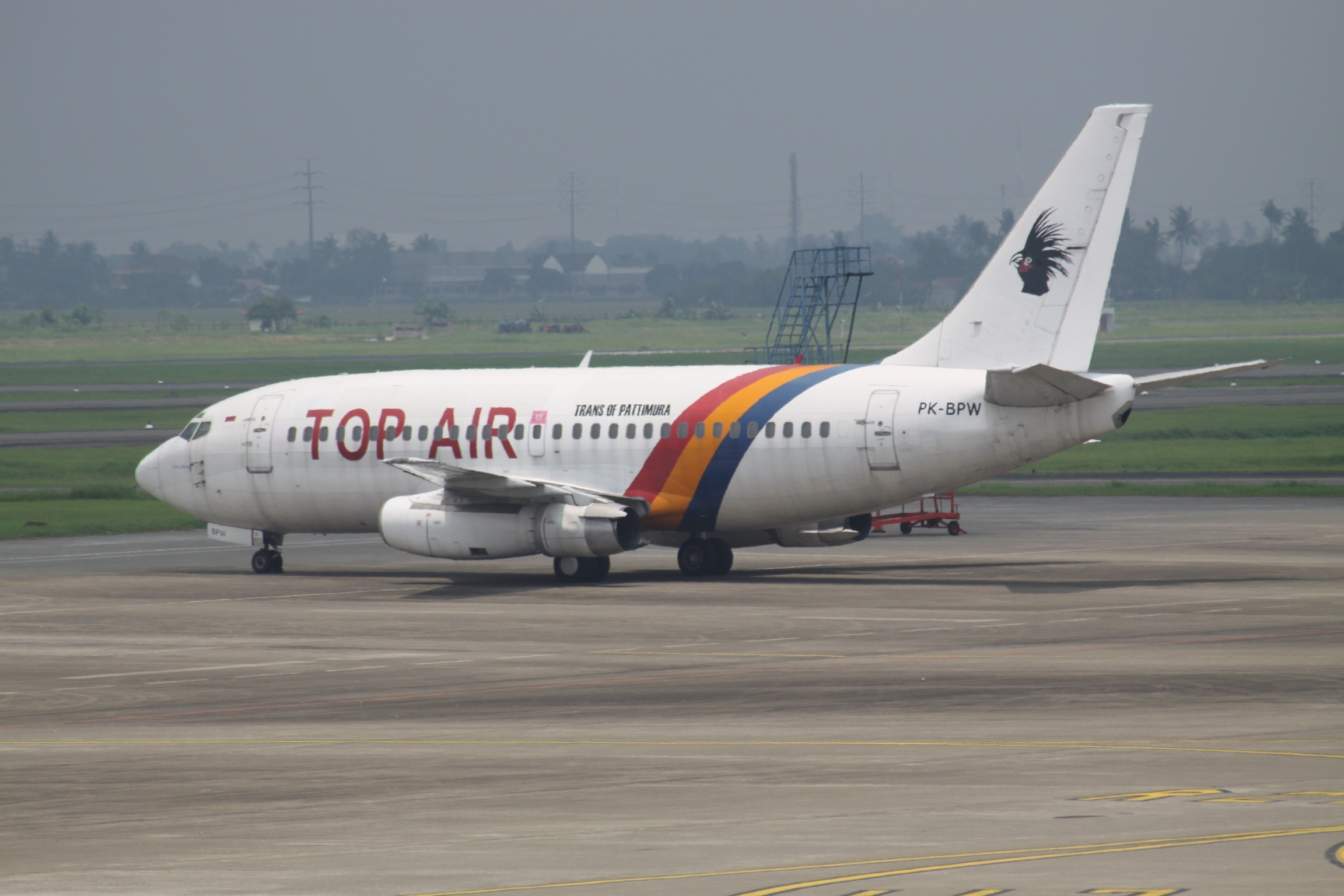
- Hubs: Jalaluddin Airport, Gorontalo
- Fleet size: 5
- Destinations: Jakarta, Ambon
- Headquarters: Gorontalo

Top Air (Trans Of Pattimura) was an airline from Indonesia, which offered scheduled passenger flights from its base at Jalaluddin Airport to a number of domestic destinations using a single Boeing 727-200 aircraft. Founded in 2004, it had its licence withdrawn in 2006. In February 2007, the Transportation Ministry delayed the license revocation of 11 idle airlines, including Top Air, to give restructuring opportunities to the owners, which did not materialize, though.

== Fleet ==
One of its former B 737s (PK-BPW) is preserved at a location in Sukabumi, Indonesia.

== Destinations ==
- Cilacap - Tunggul Wulung Airport
- Putussibau - Pangsuma Airport
- Sofifi - Sultan Nuku International Airport
- Benjina - Benjina Airport
- Sampit - H. Asan Airport
- Karawang - Karawang International Airport
- Pandeglang - Tanjung Lesung Airport
