= Tasman Cargo Airlines =

Australian cargo airline

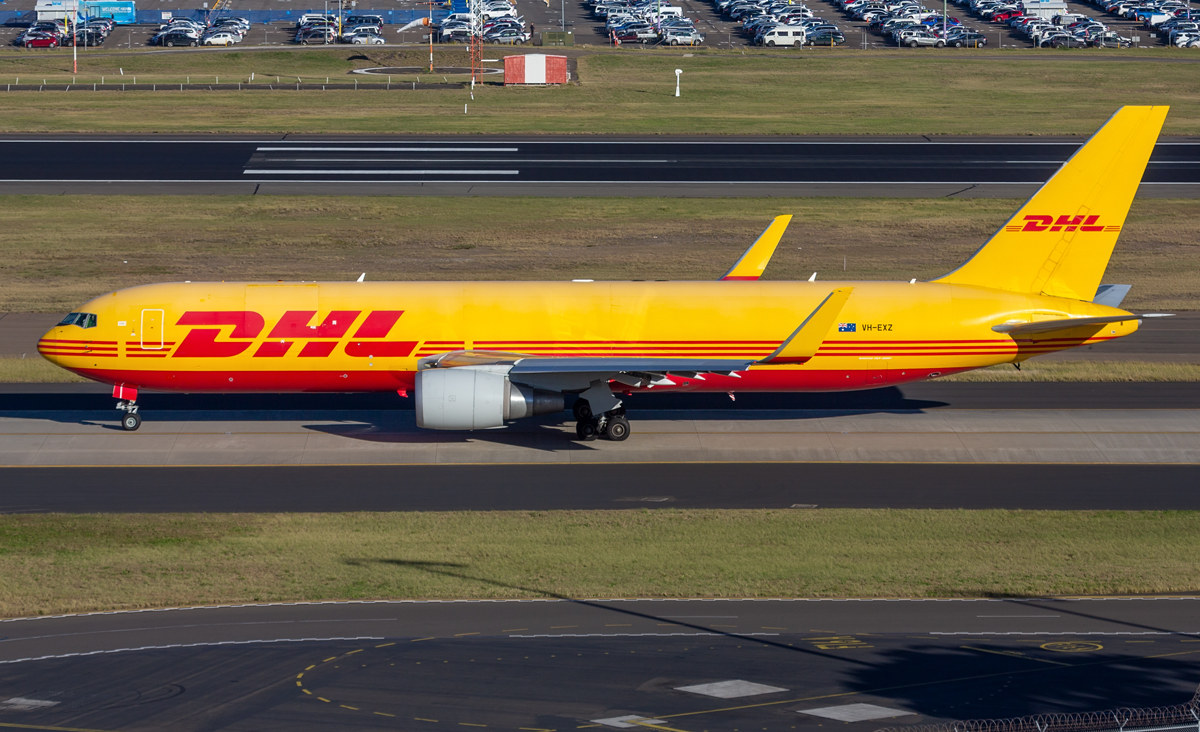
- Tasman Cargo Airlines Boeing 767-300ERF
IATA	ICAO	Call sign
HJ	TMN	TASMAN
- Commenced operations: 5 September 1994
- Fleet size: 3
- Destinations: 6
- Headquarters: Mascot, New South Wales, Australia
- Website: http://www.tasmancargo.com/

Tasman Cargo Airlines Pty. Limited is an Australian cargo airline with the head office in Sydney, Australia. It operates scheduled international cargo services on behalf of DHL and ad hoc domestic and international cargo charters. Its corporate headquarters are at Sydney Kingsford Smith Airport in the Sydney suburb of Mascot. The fleet of aircraft are Boeing 767 based at different airports in Australia and New Zealand.

== History ==
Tasman Cargo Airlines commenced operations as Premier Airlines on 5 September 1994, headquartered in Melbourne, Victoria and flying a Boeing 727-100 freighter on behalf of DHL. Due to International Civil Aviation Organization "Stage III" aircraft noise restrictions this aircraft was withdrawn from service the following year and a Boeing 727-200 was acquired. In late 1996 Premier Airlines changed its name to Asian Express Airlines to better reflect its role in flying for DHL in the Asian region, and moved its headquarters to Auckland Airport. The airline's domicile in New Zealand was short-lived; it was established at its current location by early 1998.

On 1 October 2008 the airline changed its name from Asian Express Airlines to the current Tasman Cargo Airlines. In 2010 the airline leased a Boeing 757-200PCF freighter from DHL Air UK, pending acquisition of its own 757. The leased aircraft replaced the airline's previously operated Boeing 727-200 freighter, retired on 31 August 2010 ahead of new Australian aircraft noise regulations taking effect the following day. This was the last Boeing 727 registered in Australia.

As it has operated only one aircraft the airline has used other operators' aircraft when its own was scheduled for maintenance. These other operators have included Pel-Air, Transmile Air Services and HeavyLift Cargo Airlines.

Tasman's 757 was replaced by a B767-300F in July 2018.

in 2021 a second B767-300F was added to the fleet under wet lease conditions. In 2022 a new AOC was awarded to operate two B767-300F.

In 2022 a third B767-300F was added to the fleet under wet lease conditions, and in early 2023 an additional port was added to the schedule.

== Destinations ==
Tasman Cargo Airlines operates regular scheduled cargo services on behalf of DHL Express from Auckland, Sydney, Melbourne, Christchurch and Singapore. These services operate weekly. It also has approval to operate services to Nouméa and Melbourne (the airline flew scheduled once-weekly services between Auckland and Nouméa's La Tontouta International Airport on behalf of Aircalin until late 2002). A significant part of the airline's business is the carriage of racehorses across the Tasman Sea.

== Fleet ==
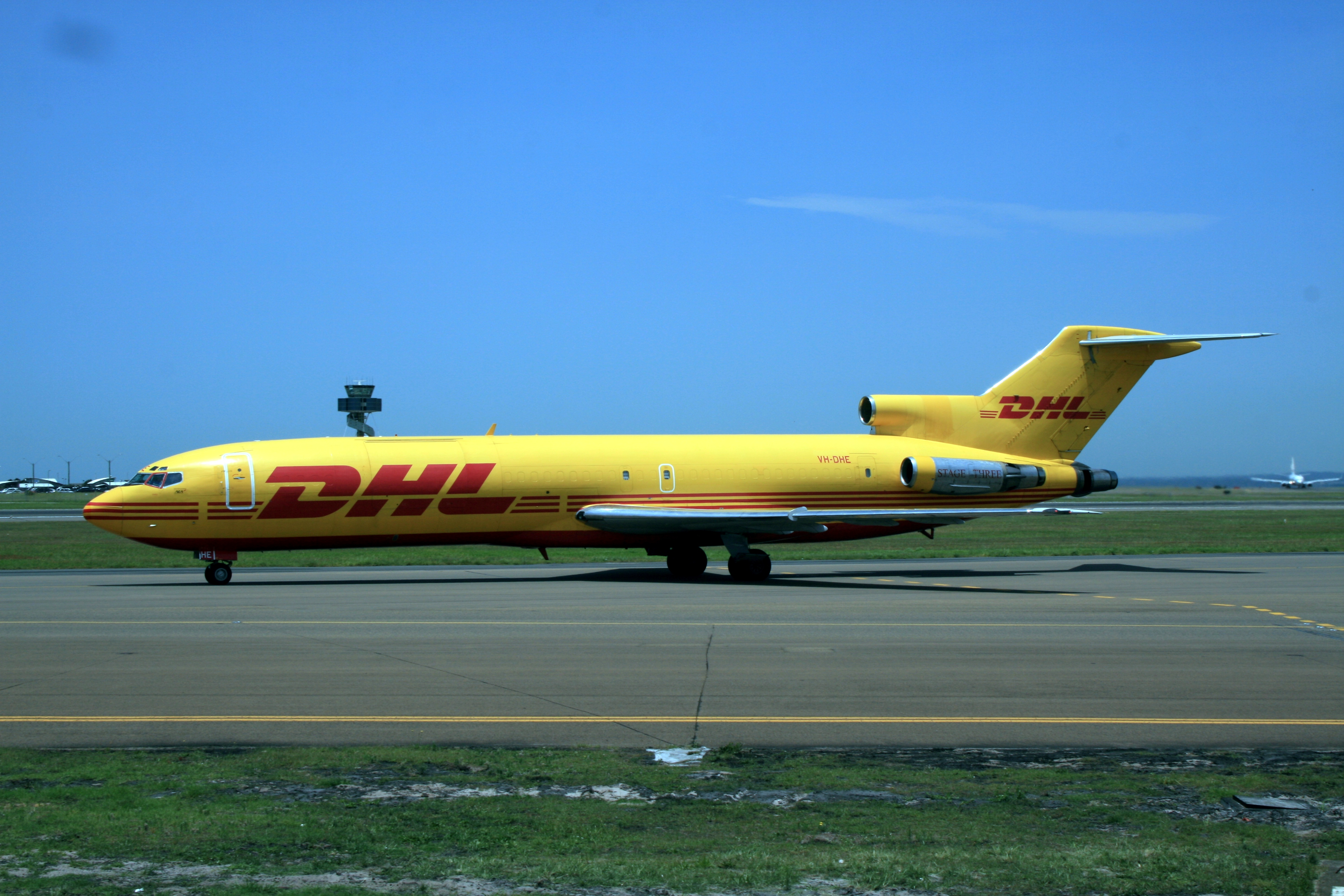
A former Tasman Cargo Airlines Boeing 727-200F taxiing at Sydney Airport

=== Current fleet ===
As of August 2025, Tasman Cargo Airlines operates the following aircraft:

Tasman Cargo Airlines fleet
Aircraft	In service	Orders	Notes
Boeing 767-300F	3	—	
Total	3	—	

=== Former fleet ===
The airline previously operated the following aircraft:

- Boeing 727-100F
- Boeing 727-200F
- Boeing 757-200PCF

== See also ==
- List of airlines of Australia
