= Noble Air =

Turkish airline

IATA	ICAO	Call sign
HK	NAD	NOBLEAIR
- Founded: 1989
- Ceased operations: 1991
- Hubs: Istanbul Atatürk Airport
- Fleet size: 6
- Headquarters: Istanbul, Turkey

Noble Air was a Turkish airline that flew charter and some scheduled flights.

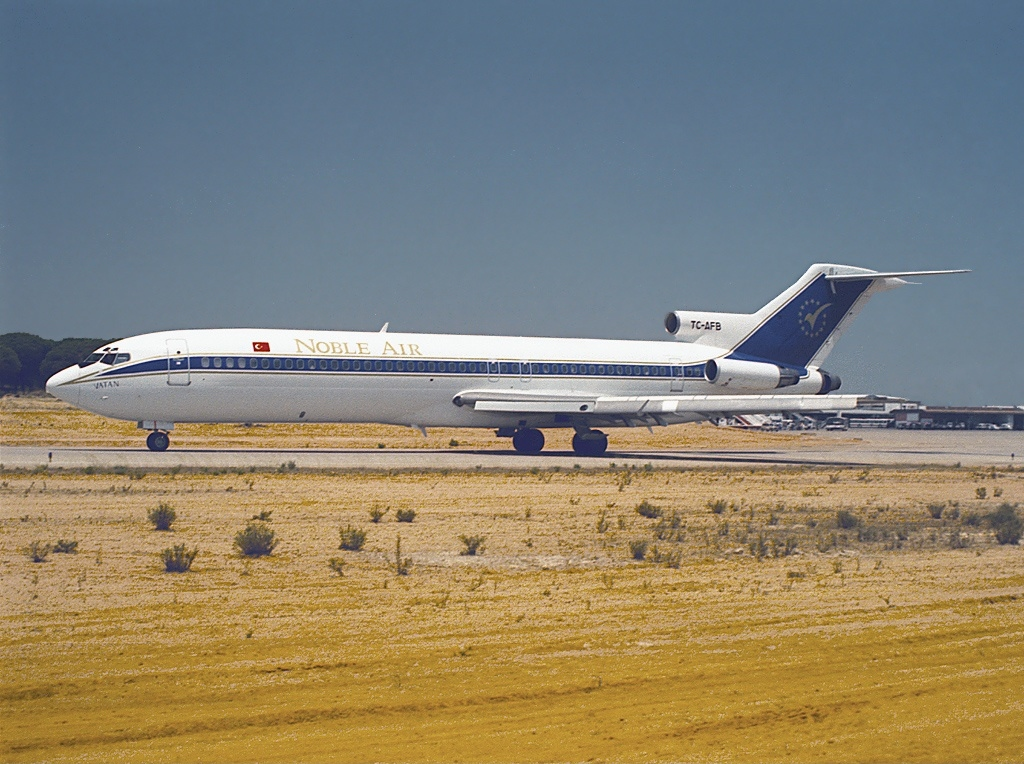
Noble Airlines Boeing 727 at Portugal (1989)

== History ==
The airline Noble Air was founded in 1989 by a joint British/Turkish company and in the beginning concentrated on charter flights from London to Turkey. The aircraft of choice was the Boeing 727-200, of which about six were operated. In 1990, it was awarded scheduled flights between London and Istanbul and also some scheduled internal routes in Turkey. Increased competition in the tourist market led to financial losses, and operations were suspended at the end of 1991.

== Fleet ==
- 3 Boeing 727-228
- 2 Boeing 727-230
- 1 Boeing 727-231
