= McClain Airlines =

IATA	ICAO	Call sign
-	-	-
- Founded: 1984; 42 years ago
- Ceased operations: February 23, 1987; 39 years ago
- Fleet size: unknown Boeing 727
- Destinations: Rockford, Illinois, O'Hare International Airport
- Headquarters: Phoenix, Arizona, United States
- Key people: Thomas McClain

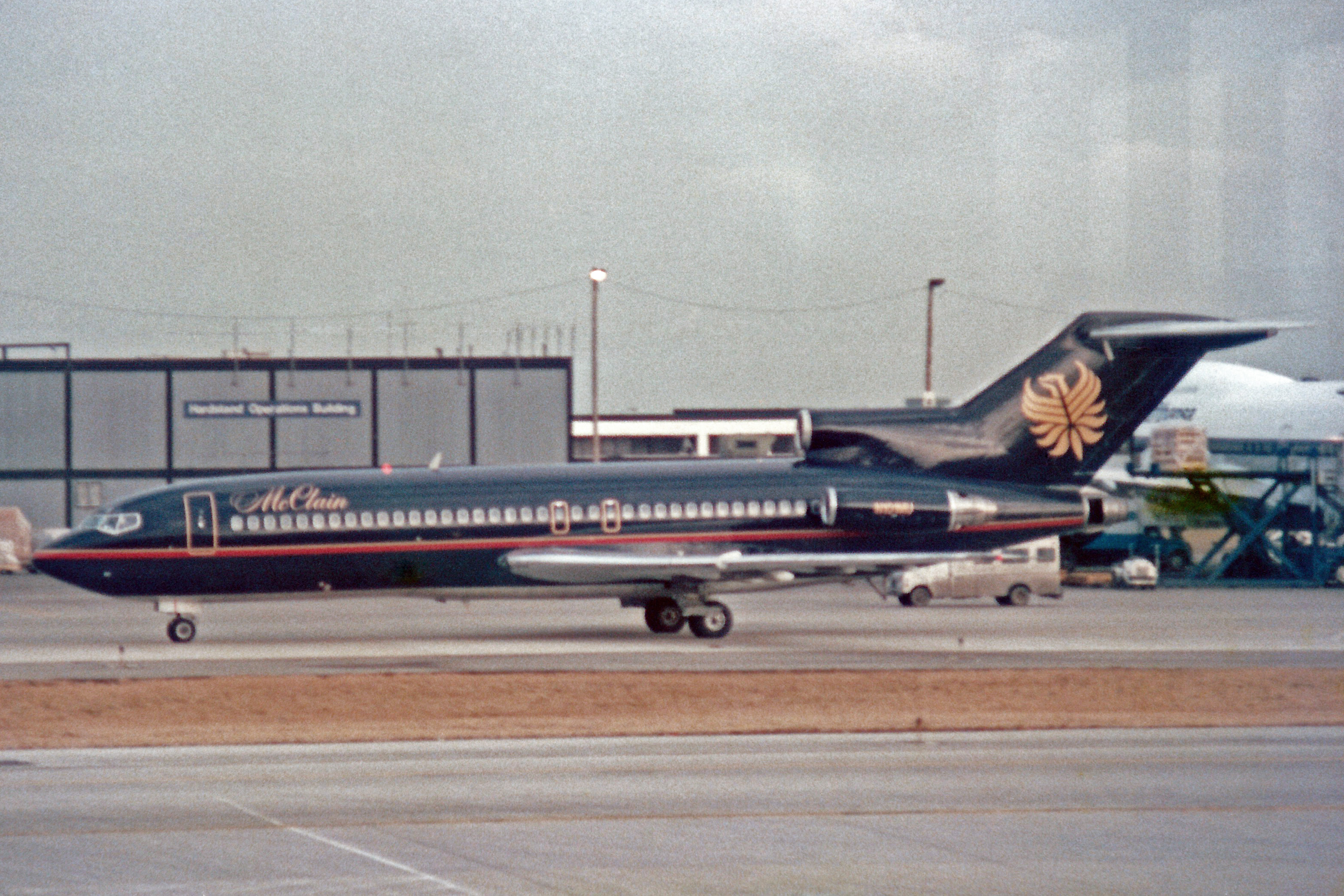
McClain Airlines Boeing 727-100 N101MU

McClain Airlines was an airline based in the United States that operated Boeing 727-100 aircraft in an all first class configuration. The airline intended to operate Los Angeles (LAX)— Chicago (ORD) flights. The airline was headquartered in Phoenix, Arizona.

The airline was started by Thomas McClain and Brenda Bearden (Brenda McClain at the time). Thomas McClain was a former U.S. Air Force pilot who went on to become an executive at Trans World Airlines (TWA) after he completed his MBA at Harvard Business School. Brenda Bearden was also an executive at TWA, and that is where the two met.

The airline was to be acquired by Air1 in 1984, before McClain Airlines began service, but Air1 went into Chapter 11 bankruptcy later that year before the acquisition was completed. Prior to entering bankruptcy, Air1 operated Boeing 727-100 and 727-200 jetliners configured with all premium service cabins in scheduled service from a hub in St. Louis nonstop to Dallas/Fort Worth, Houston Hobby Airport, Kansas City, Los Angeles, New York City Newark Airport, and Washington, D.C.

McClain Airlines later discontinued all scheduled flights and charter services.

The airline initially operated service on a short flight between Rockford, Illinois and Chicago O'Hare International Airport (ORD) in order to maintain its landing slots in Chicago, which were difficult to obtain.

McClain Airlines aircraft were painted dark blue, with a gold phoenix on the tail.The airline did not suffer any fatal accidents during its operation.

The airline ceased operations and went into Chapter 11 bankruptcy on February 23, 1987.

== See also ==
- List of defunct airlines of the United States
