= Duhok International Airport =

International Airport in Kurdistan Region, Iraq

Duhok International Airport مطار دهوك الدولي فرۆکەخانەی نێودەوڵەتی دهۆک
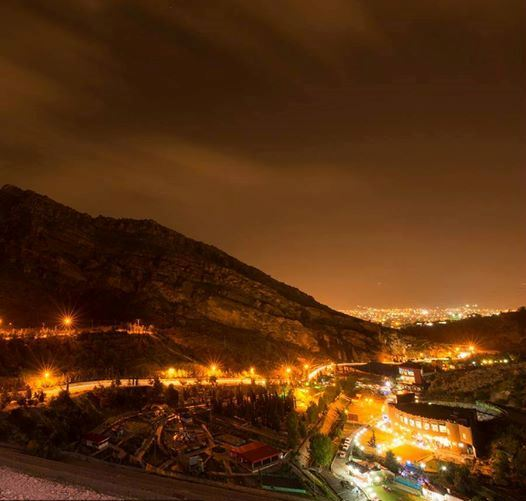
- IATA: DHK; ICAO: ORDD

Summary
- Airport type: Public
- Operator: Federal government of Iraq
- Serves: Duhok, Kurdistan Region, Iraq
- Location: Duhok
- Opened: February 1, 2012
- Coordinates: 36°54′41.418″N 42°43′42.568″E
- Website: web.archive.org/web/20140311225713/http://duhokairportproject.com

Map
- Location within Iraqi Kurdistan

Runways
Direction	Length		Surface
Direction	ft	m	Surface
12	11,745.41	3,850	330.000 tons of Asphalt
- Duhok international airport project started in 2012 and is currently under construction

Duhok International Airport (Arabic: مطار دهوك الدولي) (Kurdish: فڕۆکەخانەی نێودەوڵەتیی دھۆک) is an international airport currently under construction in Kurdistan Region, Iraq. It is located in the Duhok city province just near the town of Sêmêl. The airport serves the Duhok Governorate of Iraq.

== Construction ==
=== 2012 Opening ceremony ===
The Lebanese company Dar al-Handasa had started to build the company in the summer of 2012. At the end of February 2012 the airport facilities would have been completed. Another South Korean company, Incon, had been given the assignment to set up the structure. This was initially ordered to be done in May 2012 so that the airport could start to operate.

Duhok International Airport (DIA) would be the third international airport in the Kurdistan region of Iraq, the other two being Erbil International Airport and Sulaimaniyah International Airport. It will cover an area of 1,500 ha (3,700 acres) and will include 18 check-in desks. The project costs US$450 million and is going to handle approximately one million passengers for the first year upon service.

The project was delayed due to a number of regional crises. As of 2022, it is still under construction.
