= Korek Airlines =

- Founded: 2006
- Commenced operations: April 2006
- Ceased operations: May 2006
- Operating bases: Erbil International Airport
- Fleet size: 1
- Destinations: Charter
- Headquarters: Erbil, Kurdistan Region

Korek Airlines was an Iraqi charter airline based in Erbil, Kurdistan Region. The airline operated for only a month.

== History ==
It was established in 2006 and commenced operations in April 2006 with a wet leased McDonnell Douglas MD-83 aircraft from MAP Jet, an Austrian airline. The airline ceased operations within a month and the aircraft was returned to the leasor on 26 May 2006.

== Fleet ==
Korek Airlines operated a single wet leased McDonnell Douglas MD-83.
