= Mali Air Transport =

IATA	ICAO	Call sign
-	-	-
- Founded
- Ceased operations
- Hubs: Senou International Airport
- Fleet size: 1
- Headquarters: Bamako, Mali

Mali Air Transport is a defunct charter airline based in Bamako, Mali. Its main base was Bamako–Sénou International Airport.

== Fleet ==
The Mali Air Transport fleet included the following aircraft in May 2008:

- 1 Boeing 727-200 (which is operated for the Government of Mali)
