= Sawan Airlines =

Airline of Kurdistan

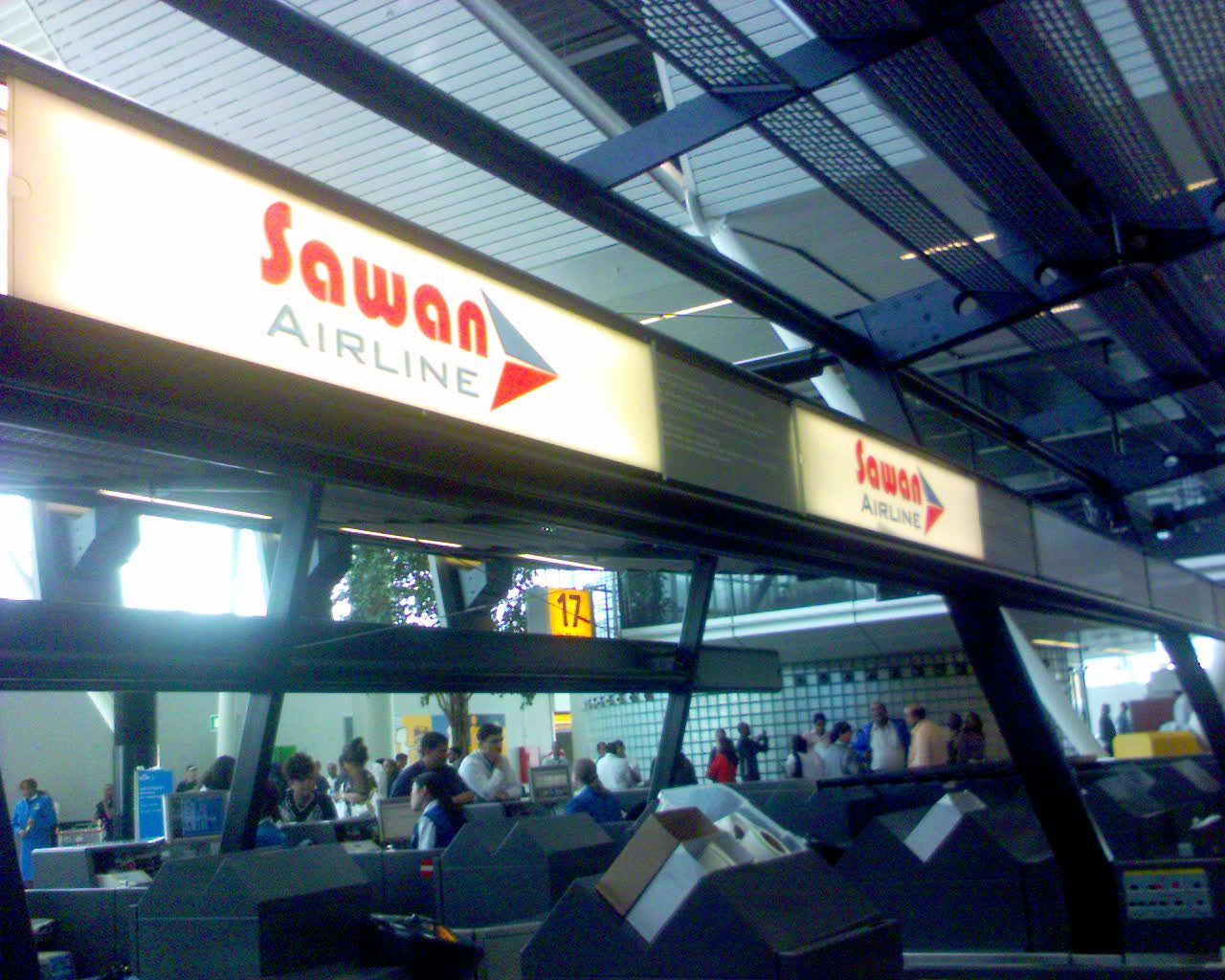
IATA	ICAO	Call sign
-	-	-
- Founded: 2005
- Commenced operations: 2005
- Ceased operations: 2006
- Headquarters: Erbil, Kurdistan Region
- Key people: Kawa Besarani

Sawan Airlines was an airline company that provided flights between The Kurdistan Region's cities Erbil and Sulaimaniyah and some cities in Europe.

In Kurdish, "sawan" means "newborn". The name was chosen to recognize the airline was the first Kurdish airline in Iraqi and Kurdish history. The airline was formed by a group of private Kurdish investors, headed by Kawa Besarani, intending to end the isolation of the Kurdistan region, which at the time required traveling through Baghdad or travelling through Turkey, Iran or Syria to get to the rest of the world. The airline used leased aircraft with Greek or German crews.

The first flight from London's Stansted Airport to Erbil took place on October 26, 2005. By 2006, plans were made for flights from Amsterdam to Sulaimaniyah.
