= FlyErbil =

Iraqi Kurdish Airline

IATA	ICAO	Call sign
BB	FBL	Fly Erbil
- Founded: 2015; 11 years ago Erbil, Iraqi Kurdistan
- Commenced operations: 2018; 8 years ago
- AOC #: ICAA AOC 012
- Hubs: Erbil International Airport
- Frequent-flyer program: Promo Class
- Fleet size: 4
- Destinations: over 20
- Headquarters: Erbil, Iraqi Kurdistan
- Key people: Serkaft Zebari (Chairman of the Board of Directors); Lawand Mamondy (CEO)
- Employees: over 200
- Website: www.flyebl.com

FlyErbil is an Iraqi Kurdish airline based at Erbil International Airport, Kurdistan Region, Iraq. The airline was founded in 2015, but there was a three-year delay before its first launch due to the ISIL offensive in northern Iraq.

== History ==
FlyErbil is a Kurdish airline founded in 2015 in Erbil, the capital of the Kurdistan Region of Iraq, by two young businessmen, Mr. Serkaft Zebari and Mr. Lawand Mamondy.

On 28 June 2018, FlyErbil successfully launched its inaugural flight from Erbil International Airport to Rotterdam The Hague Airport via Kyiv International Airport (Zhuliany). This milestone marked the airline's entry into the European market, symbolizing the growing connectivity between the Kurdistan Region of Iraq and international destinations.

== Destinations ==
As of July 2025, FlyErbil operates to the following destinations:

Country	City	Airport	Notes	Refs
Armenia	Yerevan	Zvartnots International Airport	Seasonal	
Azerbaijan	Baku	Heydar Aliyev International Airport	Seasonal	
Czech Republic	Prague	Václav Havel Airport Prague		
Germany	Cologne	Cologne Bonn Airport	Seasonal	
Germany	Düsseldorf	Düsseldorf Airport		
Germany	Frankfurt	Frankfurt Airport		
Germany	Hanover	Hannover Airport		
Germany	Munich	Munich Airport		
Germany	Stuttgart	Stuttgart Airport		
Denmark	Copenhagen	Copenhagen Airport		
Greece	Athens	Athens International Airport		
Iraq	Baghdad	Baghdad International Airport		
Iraq	Erbil	Erbil International Airport	Hub	
Lebanon	Beirut	Beirut–Rafic Hariri International Airport		
Netherlands	Amsterdam	Amsterdam Airport Schiphol		
United Arab Emirates	Dubai	Al Maktoum International Airport		
United Arab Emirates	Dubai	Dubai International Airport		
Syria	Damascus	Damascus International Airport	Resumes 2 December 2026	
Tunisia	Tunis	Tunis–Carthage International Airport		
Turkey	Ankara	Ankara Esenboğa Airport	Seasonal	
Turkey	Antalya	Antalya Airport	Seasonal	
Turkey	Istanbul	Istanbul Airport		
Turkey	Trabzon	Trabzon Airport	Seasonal	
United Kingdom	London	Gatwick Airport		
