= Jalal Talabani International Airport =

Airport in the Kurdistan Region, Iraq

Jalal Talabani International Airport مطار جلال طالباني الدولي
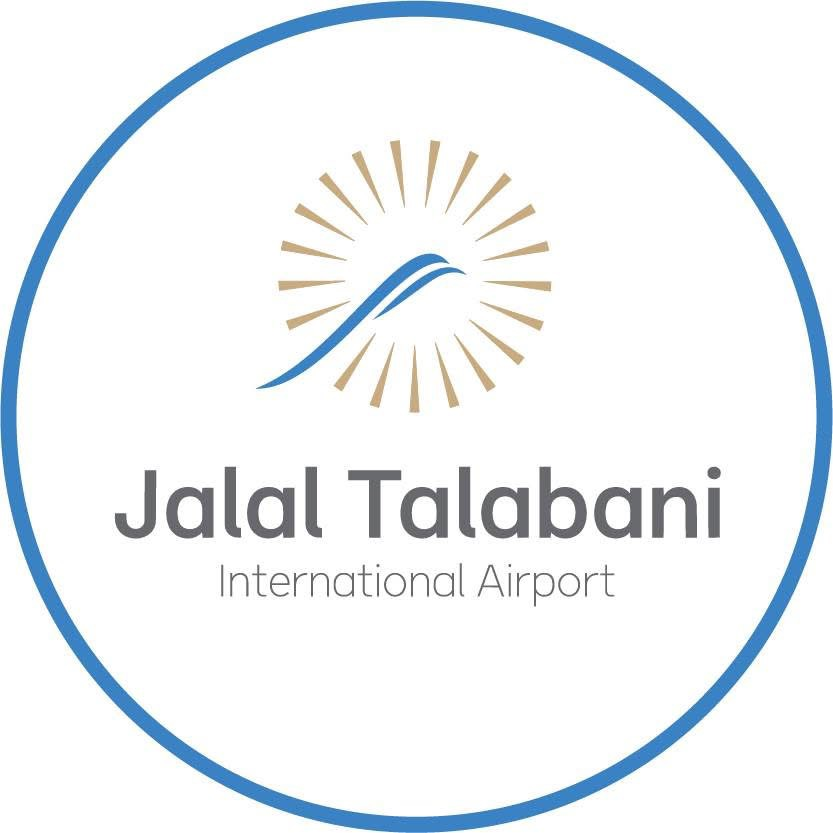
- IATA: ISU; ICAO: ORSJ

Summary
- Operator: Federal government of Iraq (ICAA)
- Serves: Sulaymaniyah, Kurdistan Region, Iraq
- Elevation AMSL: 2,492 ft (760 m)
- Coordinates: 35°33′39″N 45°18′52″E
- Website: jta.krd

Map
- Location in Iraq

Runways
Direction	Length		Surface
Direction	m	ft	Surface
13/31	3,500	11,483	Concrete

Statistics (2022)
- Passengers: 428,609
- Aircraft operations: 5,513
- Source: ICAA, COSIT.

Jalal Talabani International Airport, formerly Sulaymaniyah International Airport (IATA: ISU, ICAO: ORSJ) is 14 kilometers west of the city of Sulaymaniyah in Kurdistan Region, Iraq. The airport encompasses an approximate area of 13.5 square kilometers. The combined capacity of the airport terminals is currently 1.5 million passengers per year and can be expanded to accommodate up to 3 million passengers annually. Despite this capacity, passenger traffic in this airport is very low, peaking at only 574,645 passengers in 2015.

The airport was originally opened in 2005 under the name Sulaymaniyah International Airport. In 2025, it was proposed for the airport to have the name changed to Jalal Talabani International Airport, and this change took effect on 19 March 2026, following approval by the Iraqi Council of Ministers and the Iraqi Civil Aviation Authority (ICAA).

== History ==
Construction of the airport began in November 2003 following the removal of Saddam Hussein, with the foundation stone laid that month. It was officially opened by Jalal Talabani, who was back then the president of Iraq, on 20 July 2005, under the name Sulaymaniyah International Airport. Several months after its opening, on 2 November 2005, the airport received international recognition from the International Civil Aviation Organization (ICAO).

International flights were shut down from 29 September 2017 following a decision by the Iraq Civil Aviation Authority (ICAA) due to the 2017 Iraqi–Kurdish conflict, but the airport remained open for domestic and humanitarian flights. The international flights ban was lifted in March 2018 by Haider Al-Abadi. The airport has been operated by the Iraqi government following the 2017 ban.

In September 2025, Sulaymaniyah International Airport was officially renamed Jalal Talabani International Airport, in honor of the late Jalal Talabani, former President of Iraq and a prominent Kurdish leader. The renaming followed a proposal from the Jalal Talabani Foundation, which had pursued the change for over four years. The proposal was approved by the Iraqi Council of Ministers and Prime Minister Mohammed Shia al-Sudani. The name change officially took effect on 19 March 2026, following a decision by the Iraqi Civil Aviation Authority (ICAA). From that day on, the new designation was adopted in all official correspondence, aeronautical charts, and related technical documentation. Airport officials described the renaming as a “historic event” honoring Jalal Talabani’s legacy.

== Facilities ==
=== Passenger terminals ===
The airport has three terminals; a departures terminal, an arrivals terminal and a VIP terminal. The passenger terminal building has a two-level layout. The two levels are organized as follows:

- Ground floor (Arrivals): Passengers proceed through passport control, baggage claim, and customs inspection. Currency exchange counters and car rental desks are located in this area.
- First floor (Departures): Contains airline check-in counters, security checkpoints, passport control, and boarding gates. Duty-free shops and waiting lounges are available after security.

The VIP terminal is used primarily for private jets, government officials, and high-profile passengers. It offers dedicated check-in, private lounges, and expedited customs and immigration processing.

=== Cargo facilities ===
The cargo area is operated by Azmar Air (Note: Azmar Air is a ground handling company, not to be confused with the defunct Azmar Airlines.) as the cargo agent and Gulf Mar as the exclusive cargo handling company. Gulf Mar’s cargo handling capacity is approximately 2 million tons per year. The cargo facility of this airport features three functional decks that can offload three cargo aircraft simultaneously, making it one of the largest cargo hubs in the Kurdistan Region.

=== Runways and navigation ===
The airport has a single asphalt runway, designated 13/31. The runway length is 3,500 meters (11,483 feet) and width is 45 meters (148 feet), capable of accommodating wide-body aircraft such as the Boeing 747 and Airbus A330. The runway is equipped with precision approach path indicators (PAPI) and runway edge lights for night operations. The airport has VOR navigation aid (SUL) on a frequency of 117.00 MHz. According to the Iraqi Civil Aviation Authority (ICAA) AIP, the airport does not have an Instrument Landing System (ILS), which limits operations during poor weather conditions, particularly in winter when fog is common in the Sulaymaniyah plain.

== Airlines and destinations ==
Airlines	Destinations
AJet	Istanbul–Sabiha Gökçen
Condor	Düsseldorf
flydubai	Dubai–International
Iraqi Airways	Baghdad, Dubai–International, Istanbul
Pegasus Airlines	Istanbul–Sabiha Gökçen
Turkish Airlines	Istanbul

== Statistics ==
As of 2022, Sulaymaniyah International Airport is the fifth-busiest airport in Iraq by total passenger traffic, behind the airports in Baghdad, Najaf, Erbil and Basra.

Year	Passengers		Cargo		Aircraft operations		Ref
Year	Total	%YoY	Tons	%YoY	Movements	%YoY	Ref
2015	574,645	N.D.	N.D.	N.D.	6,999	N.D.	
2016	525,993	▼8.5%	198.4	N.D.	N.D.	N.D.	
2017	485,156	▼7.8%	38.5	▼80.6%	7,550	N.D.	
2018	309,869	▼36.1%	N.D.	N.D.	5,392	▼28.6%	
2019	474,919	▲53.3%	13,567.8	N.D.	7,500	▲39.1%	
2020	124,223	▼73.8%	10,489.0	▼22.7%	2,495	▼66.7%	
2021	277,541	▲123.4%	N.D.	N.D.	4,257	▲70.6%	
2022	428,609	▲54.4%	3,857.5	N.D.	5,513	▲29.5%	

== See also ==
- Duhok International Airport
- Erbil International Airport
- List of the busiest airports in the Middle East
