= Korek (surname) =

Korek is a Polish or Czech surname. Notable people with the surname include:

- Bettina Korek (born 1978), American arts advocate
- Dusty Korek (born 1995), Canadian ski jumper
