= Iraqi Airways =

Flag carrier of Iraq

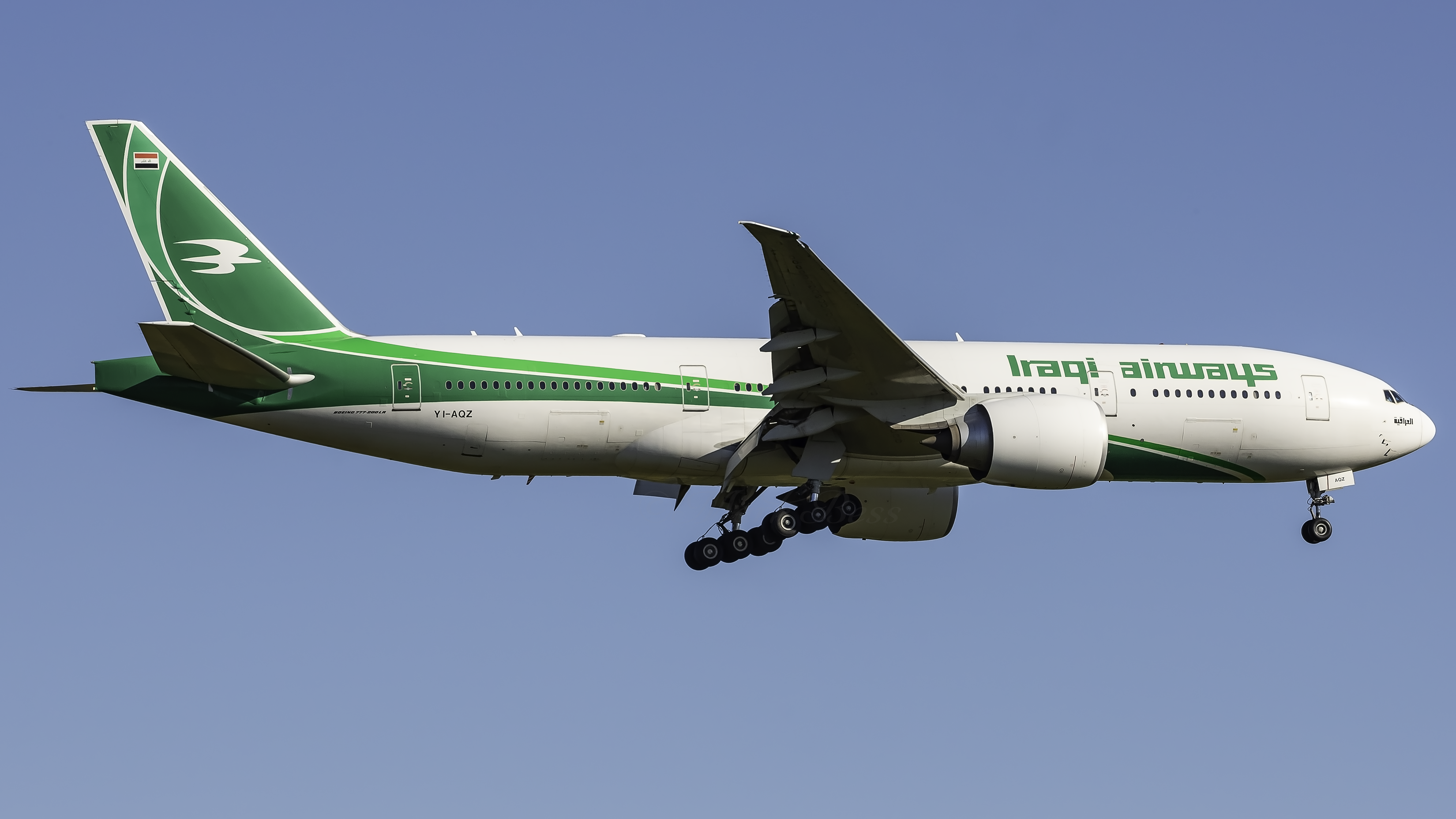
- Iraqi Airways Boeing 777-200LR
IATA	ICAO	Call sign
IA	IAW	IRAQI
- Founded: June 1945; 81 years ago Baghdad, Iraq
- Commenced operations: 28 January 1946; 80 years ago
- AOC #: 19
- Operating bases: Basra International Airport; Erbil International Airport
- Hubs: Baghdad International Airport
- Focus cities: Al Najaf International Airport; Sulaymaniyah International Airport
- Frequent-flyer program: SkyMiles
- Fleet size: 40
- Destinations: 50
- Parent company: Iraqi Government
- Headquarters: Baghdad, Iraq
- Key people: Manaf Abdul-Moneim
- Website: iraqiairways.com.iq

Iraqi Airways Company (Arabic: الخطوط الجوية العراقية, romanized: al-Xuṭūṭ al-Jawwiyyah al-ʿIrāqiyyah), operating as Iraqi Airways, is the national carrier of Iraq, headquartered on the grounds of Baghdad International Airport in Baghdad. It is the second oldest airline in the Middle East, if one includes the original Iraqi Airways that began in 1945. Iraqi Airways operates domestic and regional services; its main base is Baghdad International Airport.

== History ==
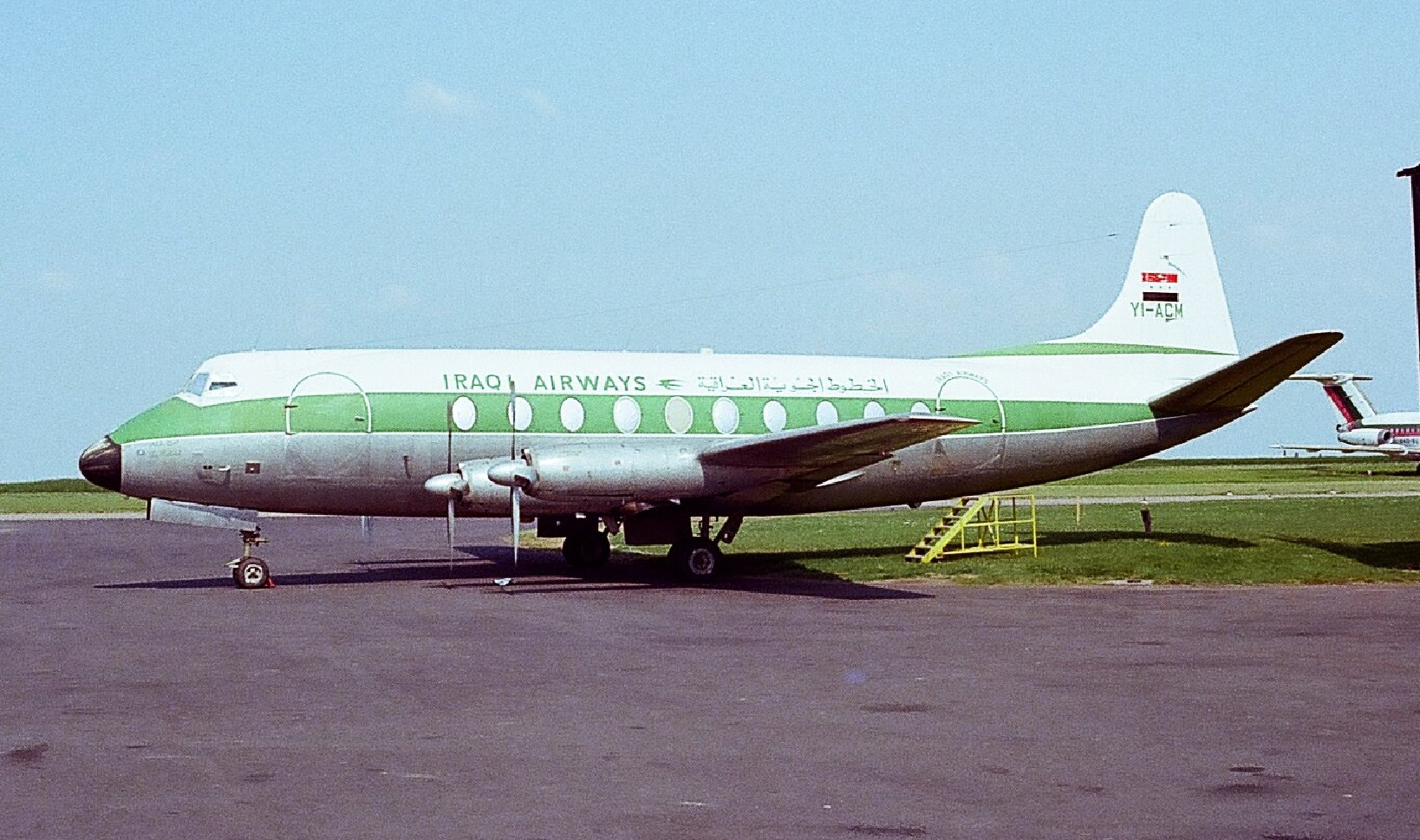
Vickers Viscount 735 at East Midlands Airport in 1978

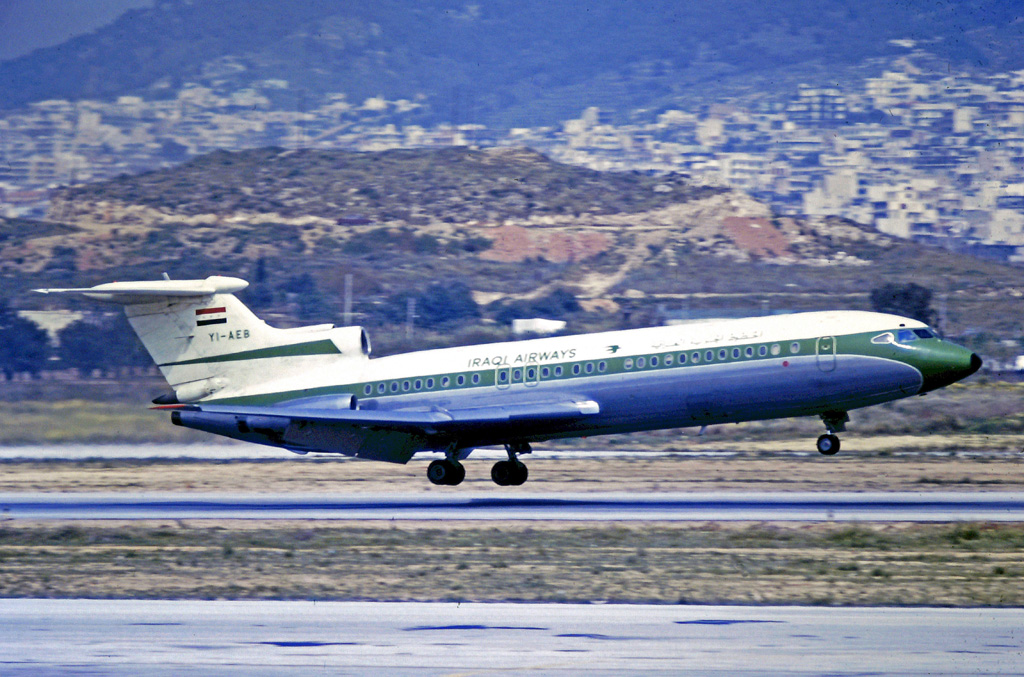
Hawker Siddeley Trident 1E landing at Athens Hellenikon Airport in 1973

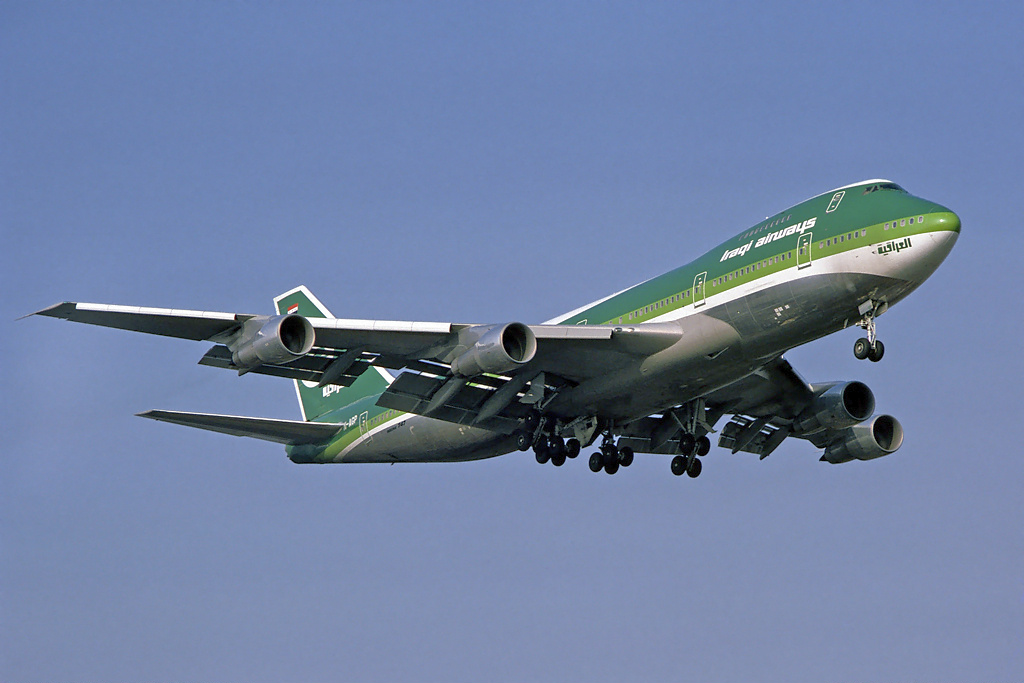
Boeing 747-200C in 1983

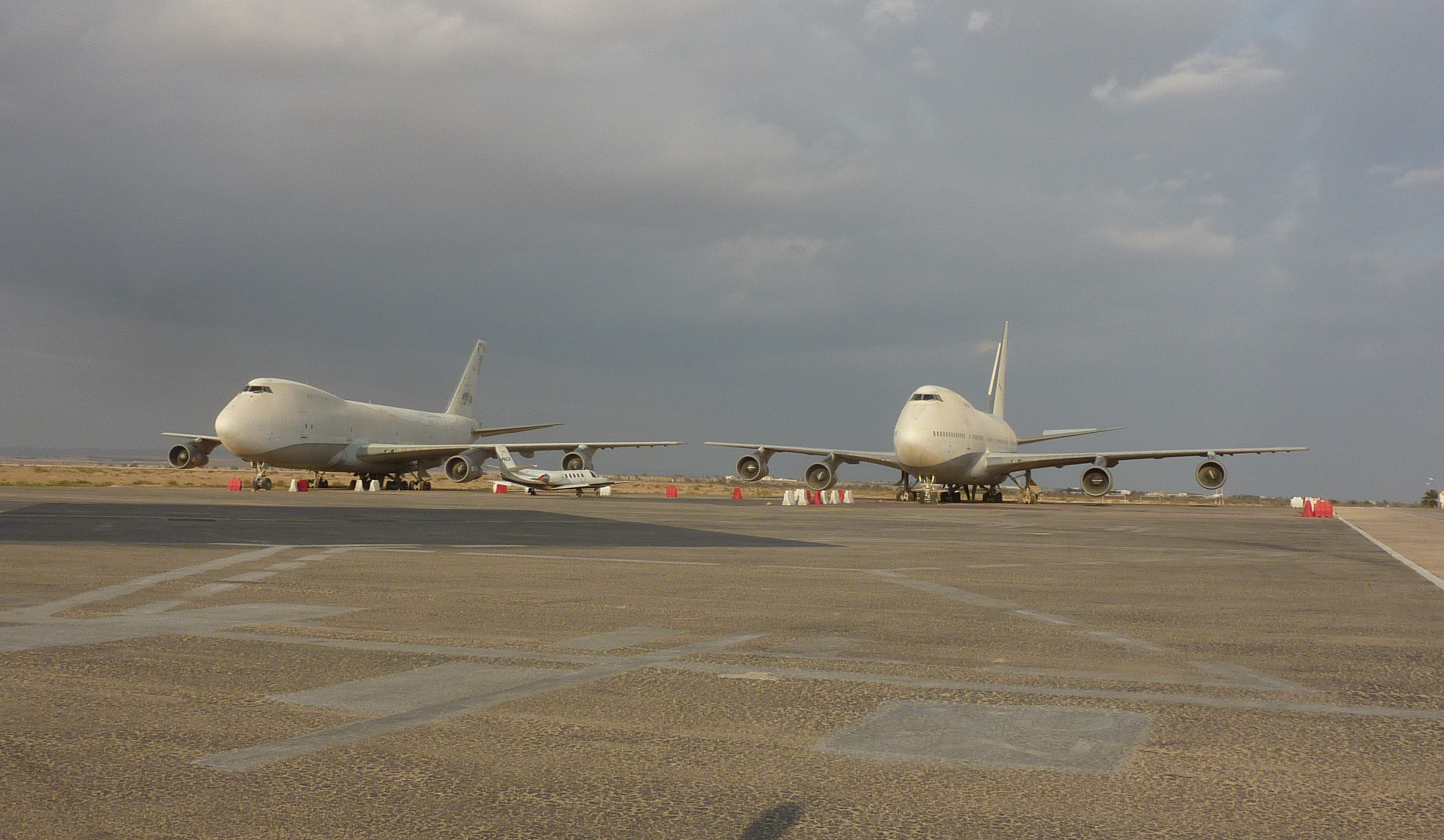
Boeing 747s originally belonging to Iraqi Airways waiting for a settlement with Kuwait since 1990 in Tozeur

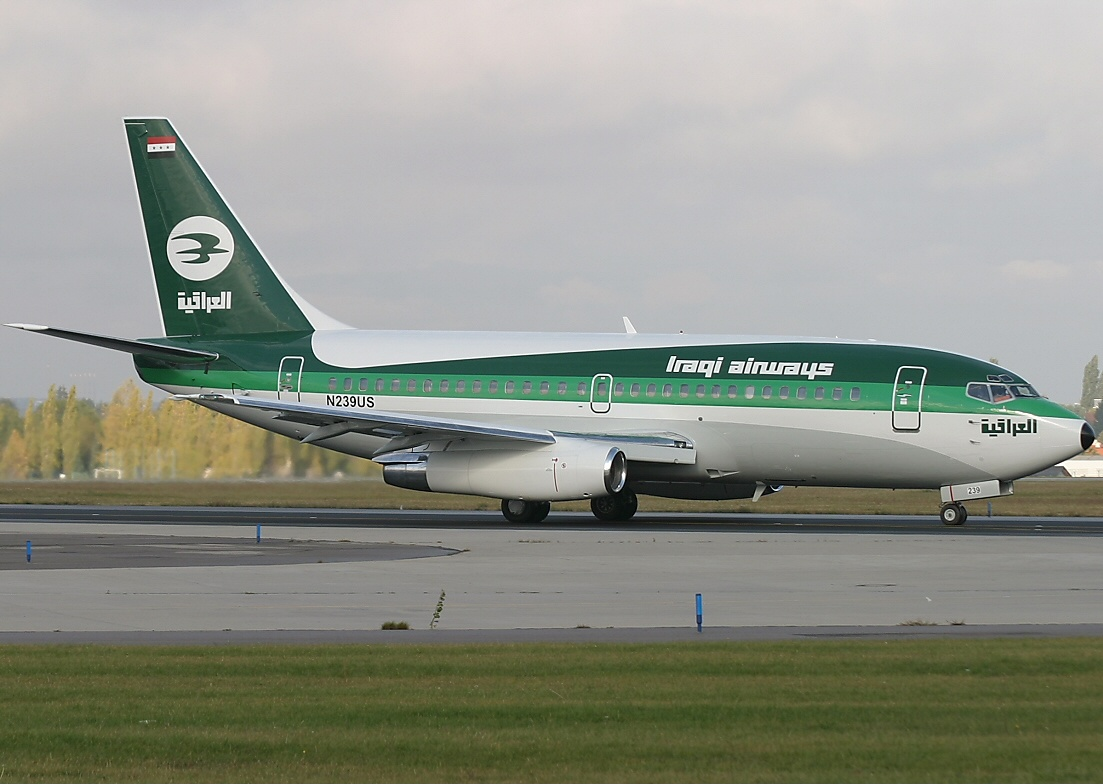
Boeing 737-200 Advanced at Prague Ruzyne Airport in 2004

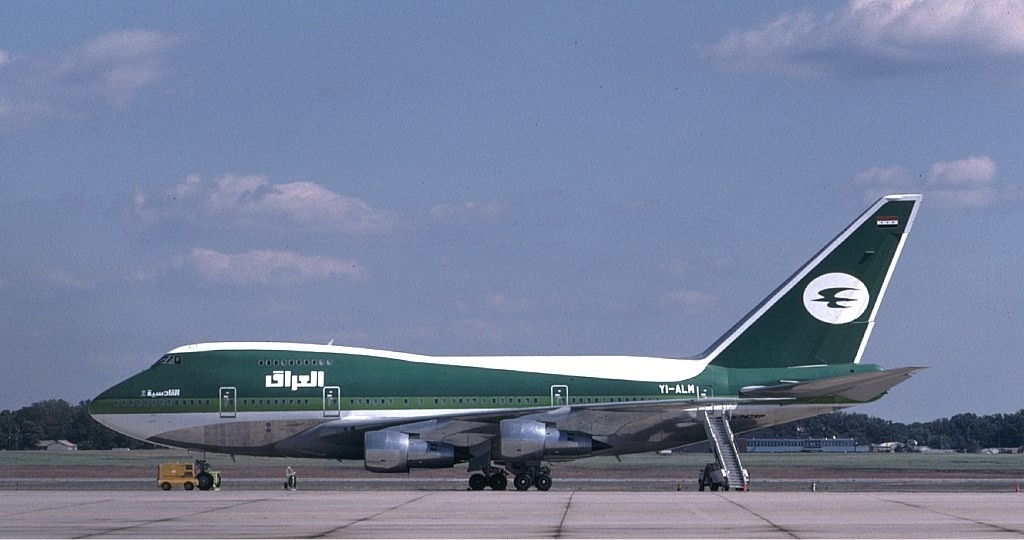
Iraqi Government Boeing 747SP operated in Iraqi Airways livery at Andrews Air Force Base in 1989

=== Early history ===
Iraqi Airways was founded in 1945 as a department of the Iraqi State Railways and started operating on 28 January 1946 using five De Havilland Dragon Rapide aircraft w that offered service to Syria. With the help of the British Overseas Airways Corporation (BOAC), the airline ordered three Vickers Viking aircraft. While waiting for the Vikings to be delivered, it leased four Douglas DC-3 aircraft from BOAC in December 1946. In 1947, the airline ordered the de Havilland Dove to replace the Dragon Rapides; the Doves were delivered in October 1947. The new Vikings were delivered at the end of 1947 and the DC-3s returned to BOAC. A fourth Viking was bought second-hand.

In 1953, the four-engined Vickers Viscount turboprop was chosen to replace the Vikings and an order for three was placed in July. The Viscounts entered service in 1955 and operated all of Iraqi Airways' international services, including a new route to London Heathrow with intermediate stops. On 1 April 1960, the airline was split from the railway company. In 1961, it placed an order for two Boeing 720Bs for delivery in 1964, but the order was later cancelled.

In the 1960s, Iraqi Airways bought Russian Tupolev Tu-124 planes as well as Hawker Siddeley Trident aircraft. These jets allowed the airline to increase services across the Middle East, to Africa and Europe. At the time, cargo aircraft such as the Ilyushin Il-76 were also purchased. During the 1970s, Iraqi Airways needed a bigger jet for a new route to John F. Kennedy International Airport in New York; it purchased the Boeing 707 and, soon after, the Boeing 747. Airfares were kept artificially low through state subsidies under the Iraqi Ba'athist government.

=== Later history ===
Attempts were made to restart domestic services after the Gulf War in May 1991, and permission was granted by the United Nations to operate helicopters on limited domestic services. Fixed-wing flights were banned under the ceasefire terms, although the UN Security Council agreed to the resumption of domestic flights. These restarted in January 1992 from Baghdad to Basra, using Antonov An-24 aircraft. Operations were suspended shortly after, following a UN ruling.

However, domestic flights became a rarity too, because of the no-fly zone imposed by the United States and United Kingdom over Iraqi skies. During the 1990s, Iraqi Airways would occasionally fly pilgrims to Muslim religious cities.

=== Revival ===
After the Iraq War, on 30 May 2003, Iraqi Airways announced plans to resume international services. The rights to the Iraqi Airways name were transferred to a new company called Iraqi Airways Company, which would establish a new airline and protect it from the legal problems tied to Saddam Hussein's regime. Operations restarted on 3 October 2004, with a flight between Baghdad and Amman.

In June 2005, Iraqi Airways operated the first domestic commercial scheduled service after the fall of Saddam Hussein's regime, from Baghdad to Basra, with 100 passengers in a Boeing 727-200. On 6 November 2005, Iraqi Airways operated a flight from Baghdad to Tehran, Iran, for the first time in twenty-five years. The aircraft, as with the rest of the fleet, was operated on its behalf by Teebah Airlines of Jordan. Services to Erbil and Sulaymaniyah were added in the summer of 2005.

In June 2009, Iraqi Airways reportedly struck a deal with British aviation authorities to resume direct from Baghdad to London Gatwick Airport; the flights were supposed to begin on 8 August 2009 using a Boeing 737-400 leased from Tor Air, and would eventually have Airbus A320-200 operating the route. This did not happen as planned, however. The airline said at the time that they intended a bigger expansion into the UK and Europe.

In November 2009, Blue Wings, a German airline, began operating flights to Düsseldorf and Frankfurt, Germany on behalf of Iraqi Airways.

On 25 April 2010, Iraqi Airways launched flights to Gatwick Airport via Malmö, Sweden. When the first flight landed in London, a Kuwaiti lawyer had the General Director Kifah Hassan's documents and passport seized, as well as the plane itself. There was no further action, however, as the plane was owned by the Swedish company Tor Air. The plane returned to Baghdad. However, Kifah Hassan was not allowed to leave the United Kingdom and went up in court on 30 April. Kuwaiti officials demanded £780 million for the planes stolen by Saddam Hussein in the 1990 invasion.

On 26 May 2010, Amer Abdul-Jabbar, Iraq's transport minister, said the company would be dissolved over the next three years to avoid asset claims by Kuwait.

In February 2012, Iraqi Airways announced that it would resume flights to India, with services to Delhi or Mumbai from Baghdad.

In April 2012, it was announced that Iraqi Airways had ordered 40 new Boeing aircraft, the order consisting of 30 Boeing 737-800 and 10 Boeing 787 Dreamliner. The first aircraft would be delivered in December 2012. Airbus in early December delivered its first A330-200 to Iraq, while Boeing delivered a Boeing 777 around the same time as well.

On 14 August 2013, Iraqi Airways took delivery of their first Boeing 737-800 directly from Boeing Company.

In June 2014, Iraqi Airways suspended services to Mosul due to the capture of the city by ISIL.

On 8 September 2015, Iraqi Airways received a loan of $2 billion from a Citibank to finance the purchase of 40 modern aircraft type Boeing 777 and Boeing 787 Dreamliner.

The airline opened a Request For Proposals (RFP) to European airlines with a valid AOC certification in late 2019. The goal was to obtain agreements to wet lease aircraft that can serve routes between Iraq and Europe.

In 2019, Iraqi Airways saw the resumption of flights to Syria, between Damascus and Baghdad.

Iraqi Airways is one of the few airlines that do not serve alcoholic beverages on their flights.

=== Livery ===
In 2008, Iraqi Airways received a single Bombardier CRJ in an adapted version of Bombardier's distinctive blue and white demonstrator livery with Iraqi titles and logos. The rest of the CRJ fleet was delivered in a version of the former green livery and YI-AQA was quickly painted to match. In 2012 Iraqi Airways adopted a new green livery which was applied fleet-wide.

== Destinations ==
In March 2009, Iraqi Airways began its first flights to Sweden in almost 19 years.

In September 2009, the airline resumed flights to Bahrain and Doha, Qatar.

In October 2009, Iraqi Airways resumed flights to Karachi, Pakistan. The airline also started seasonal (Hajj) flights to Jeddah.

After revealing the previous month that it had applied for rights to fly to Malmö, Sweden, Iraqi Airways commenced flights to the city on 28 November 2009.

== Fleet ==
=== Current fleet ===
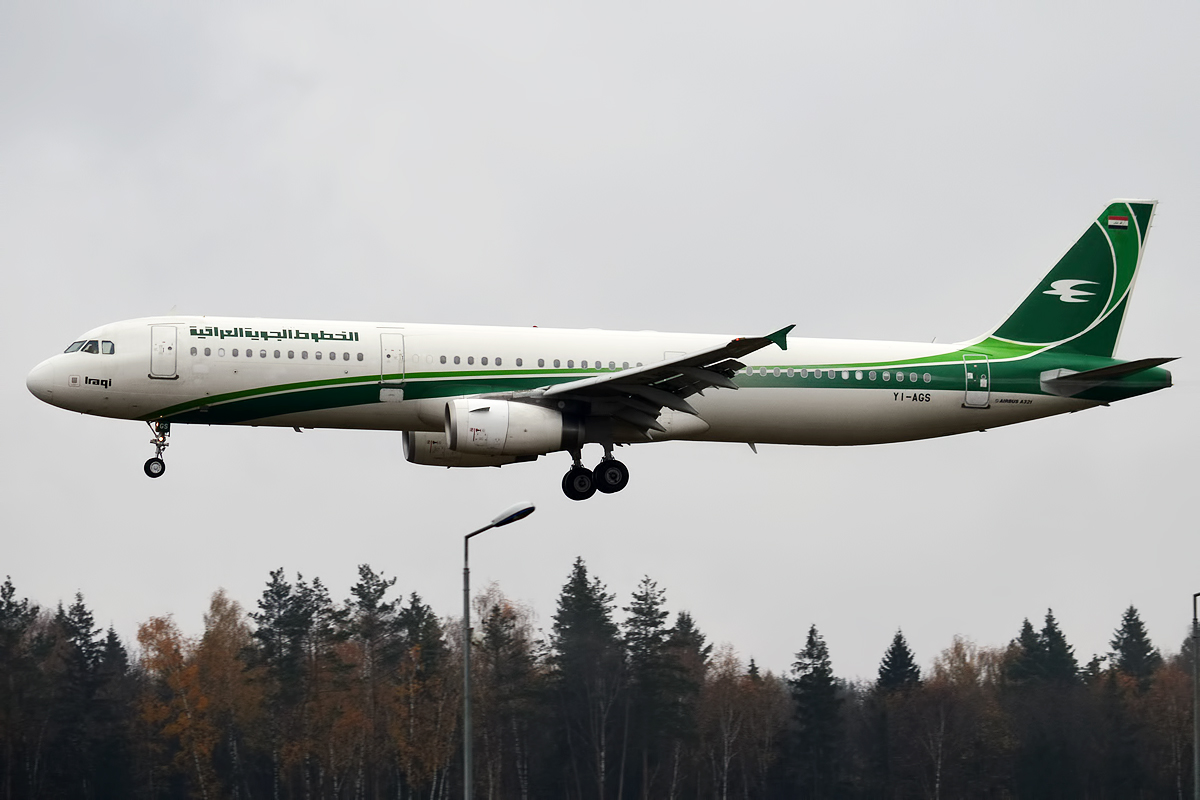
Airbus A321 in 2018

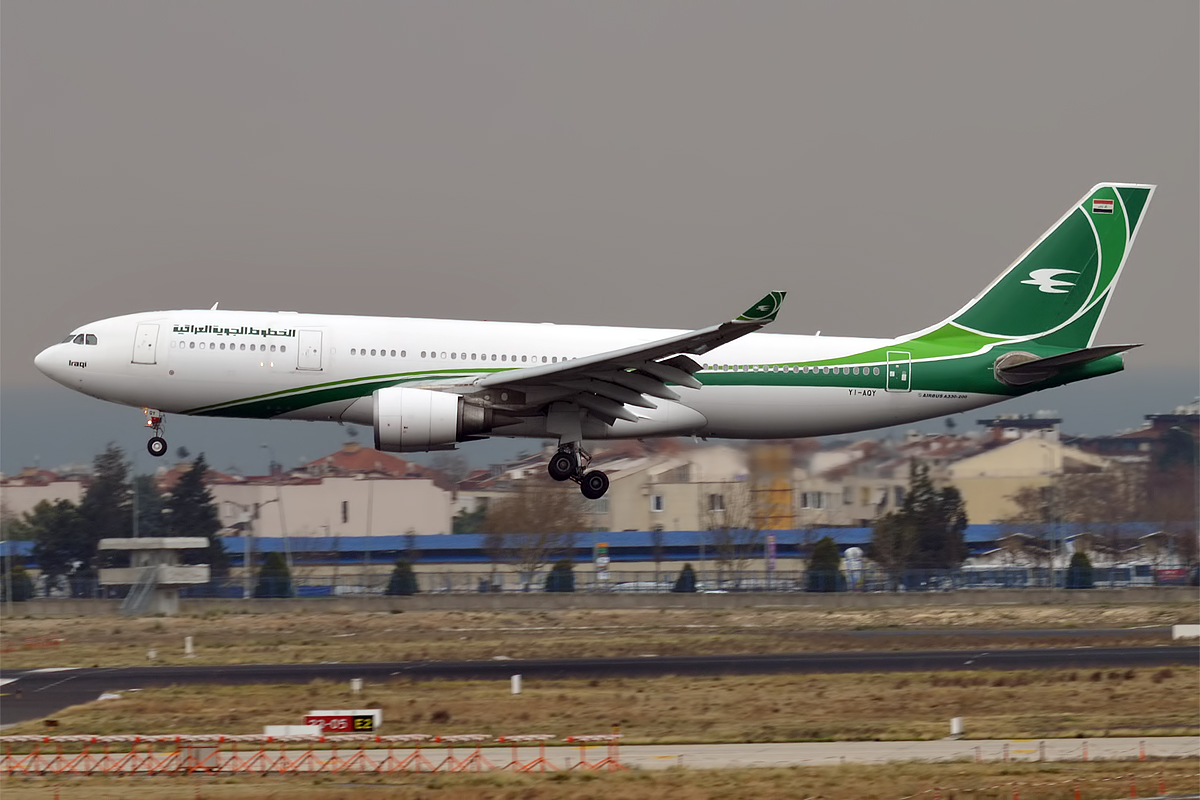
Airbus A330-200 in 2016

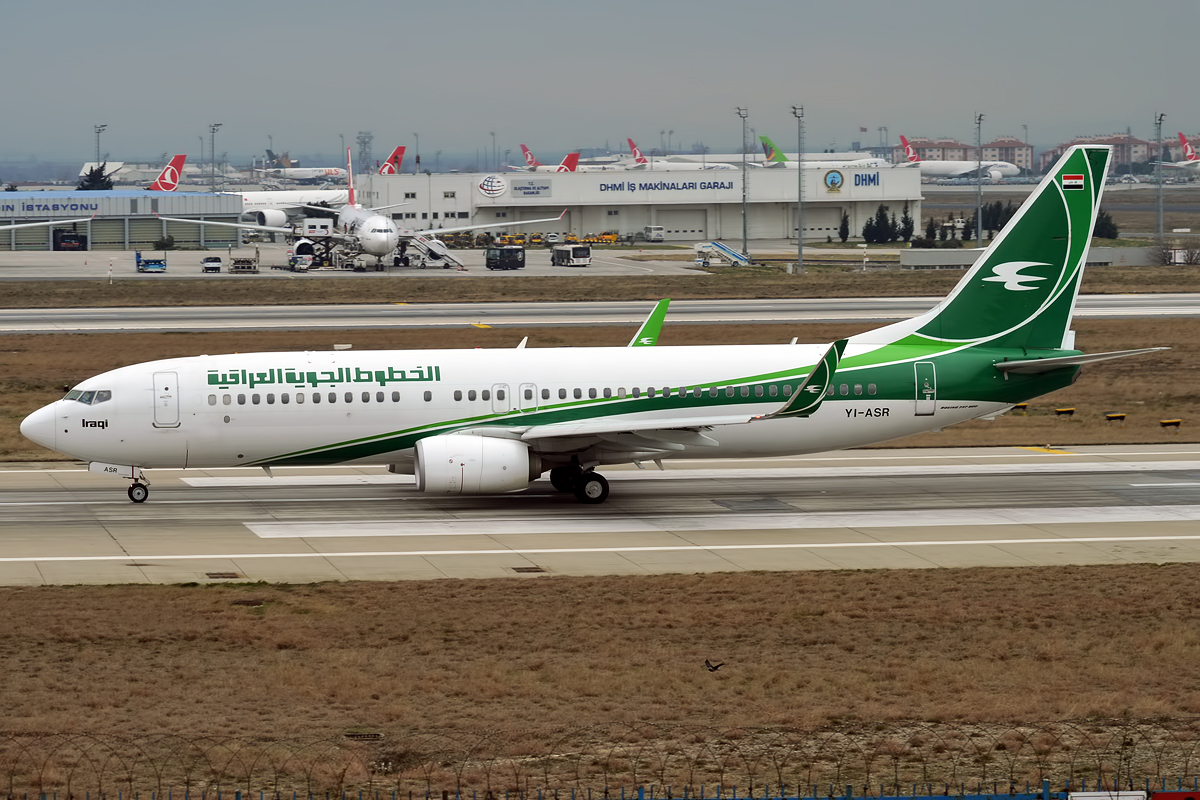
Boeing 737-800in 2019

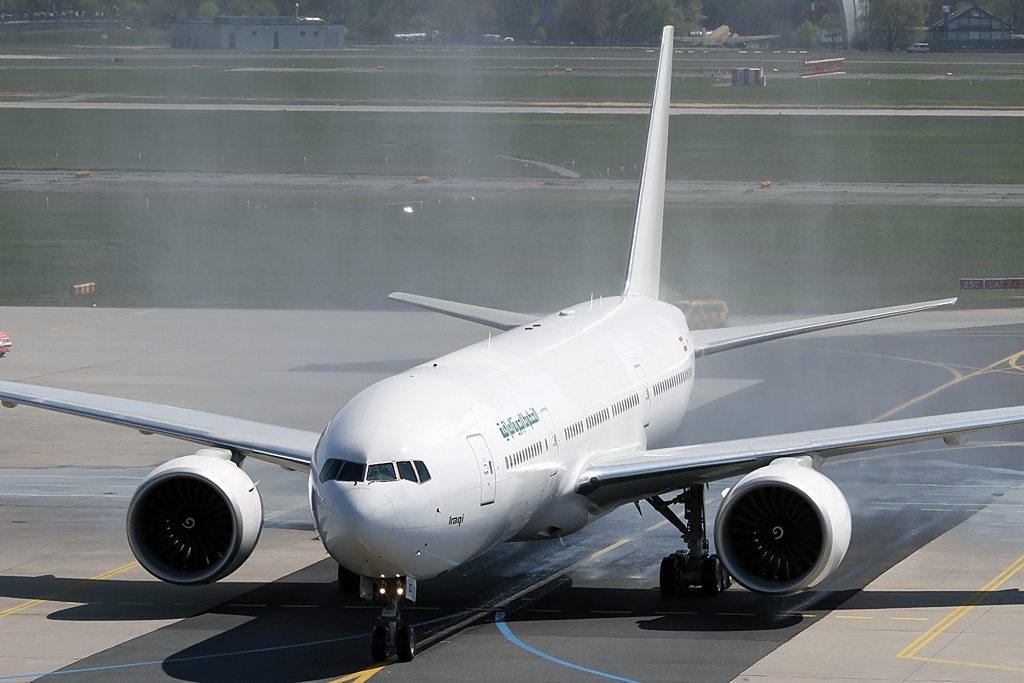
The single Boeing 777-200LR in 2013.

As of July 2026, Iraqi Airways operates the following aircraft:

Iraqi Airways fleet
Aircraft	In service	Orders	Passengers			Notes
Aircraft	In service	Orders	C	Y	Total	Notes
Airbus A220-300	5	—	12	130	142	
Airbus A320-200	3	—	—	180	180	
Airbus A321-200	2	—	—	220	220	
Airbus A330-200	1	—	24	264	288	
Boeing 737-700	1	—				
Boeing 737-800	13	—	12	150	162	
Boeing 737 MAX 8	6	—	12	150	162	
Boeing 737 MAX 10	—	10	TBA			Originally intended to begin deliveries from 2024.
Boeing 777-200LR	1	—	14	350	364	
Boeing 787-8	2	7	24	242	266	
Boeing 787-9	—	1	TBA			
Bombardier CRJ-900LR	6	—	—	90	90	
Total	40	18				

=== Fleet development ===
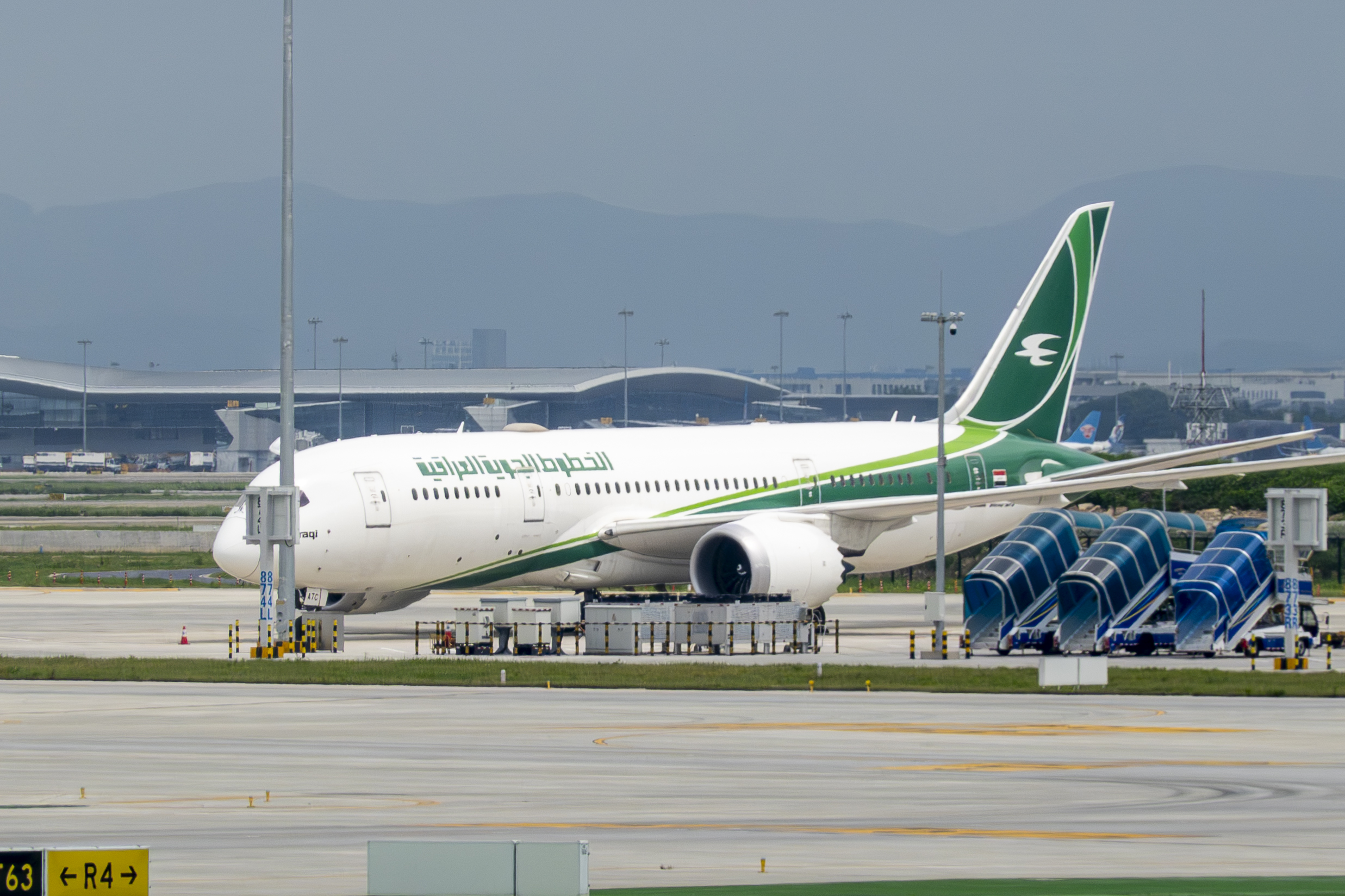
Boeing 787-8 in 2026

In May 2008, the Iraqi government signed a $2.2 billion contract with Boeing for 30 Boeing 737-800s with an option for an additional 10. It was also working on a deal involving the order of ten Boeing 787 Dreamliners aircraft for long-range service.

Another contract worth $398 million was signed for ten Bombardier CRJ-900ER aircraft with ten options. The first CRJ-900ER was delivered in October 2008. This resulted in a lawsuit against Bombardier by Kuwait Airways. Kuwait claims to have won $1.2 billion in judgments against Iraqi Airways as a result of the Gulf War. The Canadian judge ruled that he did not have jurisdiction because the case involved a foreign government, given that the purchaser of the aircraft was the government of Iraq, not Iraqi Airways. The lawsuit by Kuwait Airways was settled in 2009, with Iraq agreeing to pay $300 million.

In February 2010, Iraqi Airways announced major fleet plans, including converting 10 of the 30 orders for the Boeing 737-800 to additional wide bodies as well as bringing the delivery date forward to September 2011, and changing the 10 Boeing 787 Dreamliner orders to Boeing 777 aircraft.

== Accidents and incidents ==
Iraqi Airways was subject to fatal incidents with the last occurring on 25 December 1986. In the modern day, it has seen significant improvements in its fleet and operations. The airline has had the following incidents, accidents, and hijackings since it began operations in 1945:

- On 4 February 1955, de Havilland Dove YI-ABJ crashed following an engine fire in Al-Mansuriya, Iraq.
- On 10 October 1955, a Vickers 644 Viking 1B overran the runway at Baghdad and crashed into a ditch, where it caught fire. All nineteen passengers and crew survived, but the aircraft was written off.
- On 19 March 1965, a Vickers 773 Viscount crashed into a row of lamp posts at Cairo after a flight from Baghdad. All passengers and crew survived, but the aircraft was written off.
- On 17 April 1973, a Vickers 735 Viscount performed a belly landing at Mosul International Airport after running out of fuel. All 33 passengers and crew survived, but the aircraft was written off.
- On 1 March 1975, a Boeing 737-200 flying from Mosul to Baghdad was hijacked by three hijackers. There was one death on board, a hijacker.
- On 23 September 1980, a day after the start of the Iran–Iraq War, an Ilyushin Il-76 cargo aircraft flying from Paris to Baghdad crashed while on approach to Baghdad International Airport. It is believed the aircraft was shot down by Iranian fighter jets.
- On 24 September 1980, an Antonov An-24TV was reportedly destroyed on the ground at Kirkuk Airport during heavy fighting.
- On 22 April 1982, an Antonov An-24B crashed while on approach to an Iraqi airfield. The left-wing hit the ground, causing the aircraft to crash.
- On 28 August 1982, the undercarriage of an Antonov An-24TV collapsed on takeoff from Nasiriyah Airport. Everyone on board survived, but the aircraft was written off.
- On 16 September 1984, Iraqi Airways Flight 123, a Boeing 737-200C flying from Larnaca to Baghdad, was hijacked by three hijackers. All the passengers and crew survived.
- On 25 December 1986, Iraqi Airways Flight 163, a Boeing 737-200C flying from Baghdad to Amman experienced a hijack attempt while flying over Saudi Arabia. Four hijackers tried to enter the cockpit as the aircraft was flying at FL260. Two explosions went off, resulting in a crash near Arar, Saudi Arabia killing 63 of the 106 on board.
- During the Persian Gulf War, two Iraqi Airways Tupolev Tu-124Vs parked on the ground were destroyed by U.S. bombs.
- On July 3, 2019, an Iraqi Airways Airbus A320-200, registration YI-ARA, was performing flight IA-239 from Sulaimaniyah to London Gatwick with a stop in Sofia, carrying 78 passengers and 9 crew. When the aircraft was descending toward Sofia, the crew reported a cracked right hand windshield and requested a quick landing, however, no emergency or priority was requested. The aircraft landed on Sofia's runway 09 about 10 minutes later.
- On 27 August 2023, an Iraqi Airways Boeing 737-800, registration YI-ASW, performing flight IA-3202 from Medina to Sulaymaniyah, was on approach to Sulaymaniyah when a bird impacted the nose cone of the aircraft. The aircraft continued for a safe landing on Sulaymaniyah's runway 31. The aircraft remained on the ground in Sulaymaniyah for about 18.5 hours before returning to service.
- On 11 September 2023, a ground vehicle hit and damaged the left wing of a new Iraqi Airways Boeing 737 Max 8 (registration YI-ASY, which had been delivered in July 2023) at Baghdad International Airport, causing a fuel leak. The plane was grounded until 1 December. The aircraft underwent temporary repairs by the airline's maintenance staff, before being transferred to Southern California Logistics Airport, where the final repair of its left wing was carried out. By 1 January 2024 YI-ASY had been returned to service.
