= Erbil International Airport =

Airport in Iraq

Erbil International Airport مطار أربيل الدولي

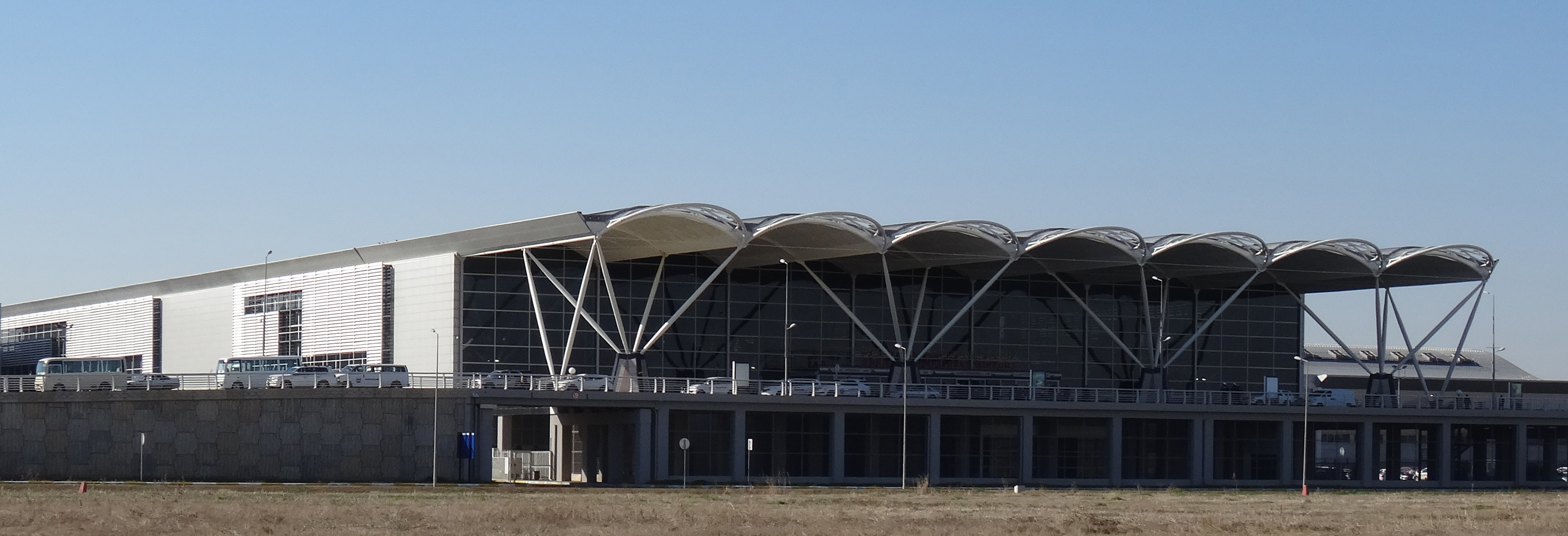
- Terminal building
- IATA: EBL; ICAO: ORER

Summary
- Airport type: Public
- Operator: Federal government of Iraq (ICAA)
- Serves: Erbil, Kurdistan Region, Iraq
- Location: Erbil
- Hub for: Iraqi Airways; Fly Erbil; UR Airlines
- Elevation AMSL: 1,363 ft (415 m)
- Coordinates: 36°14′15″N 043°57′47″E
- Website: eia.krd

Map
- Iraq

Runways
| Direction | Length | | Surface |
| Direction | m | ft | Surface |
|---|---|---|---|
| 18/36 | 4,800 | 15,748 | Concrete |

Statistics (2024)
- Passengers: 2,128,659
- Aircraft operations: 18,198
- Cargo tonnage: 19,112
- Source: ICAA, COSIT.

Erbil International Airport (IATA: EBL, ICAO: ORER), is an airport in the city of Erbil in Kurdistan Region, Iraq. It is one of two international airports in the KRI, the other being Sulaymaniyah Airport, with a third in Duhok being under construction. The current airport opened in 2005 and has one of the longest runways in the world.

== History ==
The airport was built by the Ba'athist regime at the beginning of the 1970s as an Iraqi military base. The airstrip was used as a military base until 1991 by the Ba'ath Party regime as a result of United Nations Security Council establishing a no-fly zone over northern Iraq. After the 2003 US invasion, the Kurdistan Regional Government took over administrative rule of the region. On 26 May 2005, the airport was given the ICAO airport code ORER. Endowed with natural resources including oil, natural gas and other minerals, investment in Iraq has increased substantially since 2005. The city of Erbil has been a large recipient of foreign investments.

The old Erbil airport covered 7,000 m^{2} (75,000 sq ft), and was divided into departure and arrival halls. It had three gates and a 2,800 m (9,200 ft) long runway with an ILS system. The Kurdistan International Bank, a Tourism Information office, the airline companies offices, duty-free shops, a cafeteria, and the Korek Telecom office were located inside the terminal.

The warehouse offered cargo space amounting to 4,320 m^{2} (46,500 sq ft) and consisted of an import and an export section. The cargo was handled by Dnata, a Dubai-based company.

A newly built, US$550 million airport was opened on 5 July 2005. The new airport is next to the old airport (previously a military field) and has one of the world's longest runways, 4,800 m × 75 m (15,748 ft × 246 ft) and is equipped for ILS CAT II operations. The airport's new terminal has duty-free shops and currency exchange offices. The terminal also has VIP areas for business jets, and there is a VIP terminal for visiting dignitaries and diplomats for the purpose of achieving international airport standards.

In 2010, Erbil International Airport had the least expensive aviation fuel in Iraq (at 83 US cents per litre).

From 29 September 2017 until 14 March 2018, following the failed 2017 Kurdistan Region independence referendum, all commercial international flights were suspended. The airport remained open for domestic, humanitarian, military, and diplomatic flights. The Iraqi government has been operating the airport since.

The airport has been the target of numerous drone strikes by Iran-backed Shi'ite militias in 2021. On 15 April, a drone carrying explosives targeted the military section of the airport. The section housed US-led forces, and no casualties were reported. On 6 July, another drone targeted the same section of the airport and crashed near the airport. On 11 September, two drones carrying explosives failed to reach the airport; one was shot down by C-RAM air defense and the other one crashed. There were no casualties.

== Airlines and destinations ==
=== Passenger ===
These are the airlines and destinations served from Erbil Airport:

| Airlines | Destinations |
|---|---|
| Aegean Airlines | Athens |
| Air Arabia | Sharjah |
| AJet | Ankara, Istanbul–Sabiha Gökçen |
| Austrian Airlines | Vienna |
| Egyptair | Cairo |
| Eurowings | Berlin, Cologne/Bonn, Düsseldorf, Hamburg, Hannover, Nuremberg, Stuttgart |
| Fly Baghdad | Aleppo (suspended), Baghdad, Damascus (suspended), Medina |
| Fly Cham | Damascus |
| Flydubai | Dubai–International |
| FlyErbil | Amsterdam, Athens, Baku, Beirut, Berlin, Cologne/Bonn, Copenhagen, Damascus (resumes 2 December 2026), Dubai–International, Düsseldorf, Frankfurt, Hannover, Istanbul, Latakia, London–Gatwick, Munich, Stuttgart |
| Iraqi Airways | Amman–Queen Alia, Ankara, Baghdad, Baku, Basra, Berlin, Cairo, Copenhagen, Dubai–International, Düsseldorf, Frankfurt, Istanbul, Munich, Najaf, Sulaymaniyah |
| Lufthansa | Frankfurt |
| Middle East Airlines | Beirut |
| Pegasus Airlines | Adana/Mersin, Istanbul–Sabiha Gökçen |
| Qatar Airways | Doha |
| Royal Jordanian | Amman–Queen Alia |
| SunExpress | Seasonal: Antalya |
| Turkish Airlines | Istanbul |

=== Cargo ===
| Airlines | Destinations |
|---|---|
| Royal Jordanian Cargo | Amman–Queen Alia |
| Turkish Cargo | Istanbul |

== Statistics ==
As of 2022, Erbil International Airport is the third-busiest airport in Iraq, behind Baghdad International Airport and Al Najaf International Airport. It is the busiest airport in the Kurdistan Region.

== Incidents ==
- On 6 July 2021, a series of attacks against the airport were reported, including drone and rocket attacks.
- Erbil Airport has been targeted numerous times during the Gaza war.

== See also ==
- List of the busiest airports in the Middle East
