= Iraqi Civil Aviation Authority =

- سلطة الطيران المدني العراقي
- Abbreviation: ICAA
- Headquarters: Baghdad, Iraq
- Head: Vacant
- Deputy Head: Amjad Kadhim al-Juburi
- Website: icaa.gov.iq

The Iraqi Civil Aviation Authority (ICAA) is the governmental body responsible for administering international airports in the country, regulating and supervising the civil aviation sector as well as implementing safety standards in Iraq.

It is responsible for ensuring compliance with the provisions of the Chicago Convention, its Annexes and Amendments, and compliance with the standards and recommendations of the International Civil Aviation Organization (ICAO)

It is the sole civil aviation authority in the country and operates in accordance with Civil Aviation law No. (148) of 1974 and its amendments. The ICAA's duties include supervising and monitoring air navigation services, airports, and runways, and issuing rules and manuals related to the operation of appropriate unified systems for air transport, security, safety, navigation, and all operational services at airports and facilities related to civil aviation.

== Budget and revenue ==
The Civil Aviation Authority of Iraq oversees all civil aviation activities and the work of relevant agencies and authorities operating at airports, regardless of their affiliation.

This authority was allocated budgets totaling 161 billion and 410 million dinars for operational and investment activities in 2019, 196 billion and 676 million dinars in 2020, and exceeding 123 billion and 505 million dinars in 2021. Its 2023 budget was 324 billion and 138 million dinars, the same figure as the 2024 and 2025 budgets, according to the three-year budget for 2023, 2024, and 2025.

Revenues reached more than 130 billion dinars in 2019 and 134 billion dinars in 2018, despite a decline in 2014 to 87 billion dinars due to ISIS's occupation of a third of Iraq's territory in the same year. The war against the extremist organization affected the Civil Aviation Authority's revenues, which declined again in 2015 to 56 billion and 720 million dinars, then rose slightly in 2016 to 63 billion dinars, and then 69 billion dinars in 2017. The Civil Aviation Authority sets a $450 fee on aircraft crossing its airspace, which amounts to 600 aircraft per day. Its daily revenues amount to $270,000, $8 million per month, and more than $97 million annually. It is noteworthy that over the past years, the change of the head of the Civil Aviation Authority has been linked to the change of the Iraqi Prime Minister. During the period when Abdul Mahdi handed over his duties to the new Prime Minister, Mustafa Al-Kadhimi, his chief of staff, Abdul Khaliq Saad Ghani, appointed Duraid Yahya Ghanem as head of the Civil Aviation Authority. One month after Al-Kadhimi assumed the premiership, Duraid Yahya was dismissed from his position, and Nael Saad Abdul Hadi was appointed on June 25, 2020. As soon as the current Prime Minister, Mohammed Shia Al-Sudani, assumed his position on October 27, 2022, he dismissed Abdul Hadi and appointed Ammar Abdul Razzaq Abdul Ali Al-Asadi on November 19, 2022.
