= Postal services in the United Kingdom =

Postal services in the United Kingdom are provided predominantly by the Royal Mail (and Post Office Limited which oversees post offices). Since 2006, the market has been fully opened to competition which has had greater success in business-to-business delivery than in ordinary letter delivery.

The industry is regulated by Ofcom and consumer interests are represented by Consumer Focus. Since 1 October 2011, the main piece of legislation is the Postal Services Act 2011, although some parts of the Postal Services Act 2000 are still in force. The 2011 Act enables the government to privatise Royal Mail and to possibly mutualise Post Office Limited.

== History ==
The quality of postal services in the 17th and 18th centuries improved with development of better roads and means of transport.

Anthony Trollope is credited with major contributions to the development of postal services in the years 1851-1867, described, e.g. in Chapters 8 and 13 of his autobiography.

- Postmaster General, position created in 1510
- Royal Mail, established 1516 by King Henry VIII
- Post Office, established 1635 by King Charles I
- General Post Office, established 1653 by Oliver Cromwell
- General Post Office (Restoration Post Office), established 1660 by King Charles II
- Henry Bishop, inventor of the postmark, 1661
- Rowland Hill, creator of the penny post, 1840
- John Stonehouse, introduces first and second class postage, 1968
  - Last officeholder of Postmaster General, 1969
  - First Minister of Posts and Information, 1969
  - Embezzlement and fraud, c. 1970
  - Faked his own death, 1974
  - Discovered to be a KGB spy, 1975
- Post Office Limited, separated from Royal Mail as a new business in 1986
- Parcelforce, separated as a new division within Royal Mail in 1986
- Green Paper on Postal Reform (1994) published, options for further privatisation and regulation of the Post Office and Royal Mail
- British Forces Post Office, the British Armed Forces’ postal & courier service, a history of its development
- British Post Office scandal, 1999–2012
- Royal Mail, became fully privatized, 2012

== Law ==
- Postal Services Act 2000
- Postal Services Act 2011
- First Postal Services Directive, 97/67/EC
- Second Postal Services Directive, 2002/39/EC
- Third Postal Services Directive, 2008/06/EC

== Industry ==
A small number of postal services operate widely in the United Kingdom. Most notably and previously mentioned is Royal Mail. After the opening up of the industry, competitors such as Whistl and UK Mail found their place offering business postal solutions. These companies, despite being competitors to Royal Mail, hand over sorted mail to the Royal Mail for "last mile delivery" due to the sheer dominance the latter hold in a process called 'Down Stream Access'.

Alongside Royal Mail and their descendent companies, there are a variety of nationwide next-day delivery companies which handle both letters and parcels, including DPD, DHL, Evri and FedEx, among others, along with service aggregators like Parcelhero. There are also a large number of local couriers that operate in specific geographic areas, like Stuart, Packfleet and City Link, as well as specialist couriers that handle specific items, like DX.

== See also ==
- Public service law in the United Kingdom
- Telecommunications in the United Kingdom
- Broadcasting in the United Kingdom
- Energy policy of the United Kingdom
