= Postreform =

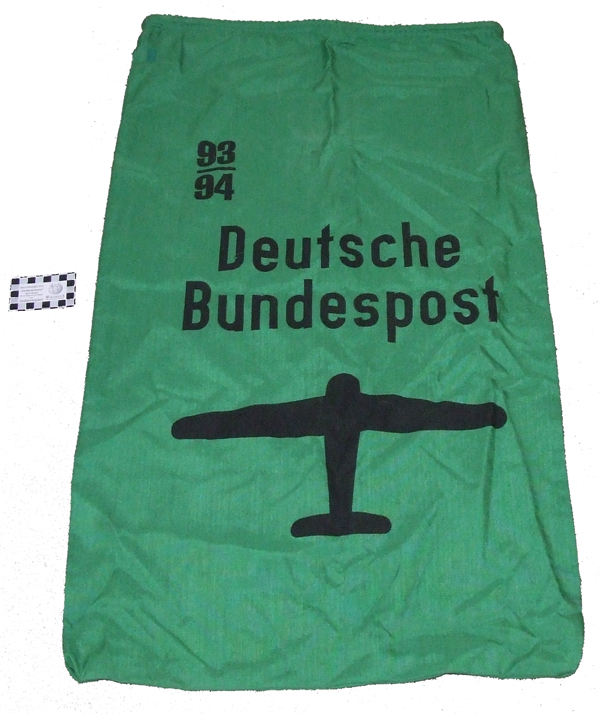
The state postal company Deutsche Bundespost was privatised through the Postreform.

The Postreform (lit. 'Postal reform') was a reform package in Germany whose aim was the privatization of the West German special fund Deutsche Bundespost (DBP).

== Background ==
Rapid technological advancements and increasing market dynamics, primarily driven by the competition from the American telecommunications sector expanding, which put the German Federal Post Office under pressure. It found itself increasingly unable to translate the diverse range of technological possibilities into marketable offerings. Since there was (almost) no competition in the German postal and telecommunications market, there was also no incentive for significant research efforts, improved customer service, or cost reductions.

Another reason for the reform was the liberalization debate that began in the late 1970s. This culminated in the Single European Act of 1986, which was a prerequisite for the completion of the European Single Market. Within the European single market, the four freedoms were to be fully realized: the free movement of persons, goods, services, and capital. This meant, among other things, that companies from member states could offer their goods and services across borders without restrictions. This led to a rethink regarding state monopolies in certain economic sectors. These were to be gradually opened up to free competition. The European Commission initiated several proceedings against member states under competition rules. As a result, the DBP also had to accept a curtailment of its monopoly rights and the relinquishment of certain areas of activity.

Following the final report of a government commission on telecommunications and the increasing external pressure for liberalization from other member states such as France and the United Kingdom, a reform concept that could garner a majority was adopted in the then governing coalition (CDU/CSU and FDP) in May 1988.

== First Postreform (1989) ==
The aim of the reform was to expand and promote the diversity of services in market sectors where customer needs are rapidly evolving. Following this law, the German Federal Post Office (DBP) was restructured and divided into three public companies. This was intended to avoid inefficiencies and economies of scale. The companies Postal Service, Postbank, and Telekom are managed by a management board and a supervisory board.

The business units continued to perform sovereign functions under the direction of the Federal Ministry of Post and Telecommunications. The German Federal Post Office retained its postal monopolies in mail delivery and the telephone network, with the exception of mobile communications; all other services could henceforth also be provided by private companies.

Political control mechanisms were safeguarded, and the unity of the German Federal Post Office remained intact. Thus, the three companies could not establish their own legal entities, and a conversion into a private company was ruled out. The conflict between political and corporate objectives was also mitigated, but not eliminated, for the reasons mentioned above.

Following the enactment of the Postal Structure Act on 1 July 1989, the liberalized market experienced extraordinary growth. Developments were characterized by rapid expansion of services, deeper product differentiation, and sharp price declines. Due to the still-prevailing constitutional restrictions, the international operational capacity of the three DBP companies was limited. State-controlled companies were not considered potential partners for strategic alliances. The German economy faced competitive disadvantages if the DBP did not engage in international competition. While Postal Reform I now permitted foreign companies to enter the German market, the three DBP companies, as direct federal agencies, could not operate in the liberalized foreign postal and telecommunications markets.

The first postal reform created the conditions for privatization and the abolition of the monopoly.

== Second Postreform (1994) ==
In 1989, the German Federal Government began the partial privatization of the three state-owned companies of the German Federal Post Office (DBP ). Enormous investments were required in the then-new federal states to establish telephone and mobile phone services. DBP Telekom alone invested DM 60 billion in northeastern Germany by 1997. Despite massive borrowing, the federal government faced an extremely strained budget situation and avoided contributing its own funds, causing the equity ratio to fall far below the legally required 33%. To appease voters, the federal government did not increase postal and telephone rates.

Solutions to the capital procurement problems had to be found quickly. The result of a newly appointed negotiating commission, following a two-year process, was the second Postal Reform in 1994. All three companies of the German Federal Post Office (DBP) were to be transformed into publicly traded corporations. This enabled them to strengthen their equity capital, participate in international consortia, and expand their global presence. From 1996 onward, the corporations were fully subject to taxation, but the federal government suffered significant revenue losses. The federal government compensated for the loss of their paid-in profits through tax payments from the three companies, dividends, and share sales. This led to the creation of Deutsche Post AG, the Deutsche Telekom AG and the Deutsche Postbank AG. The federal government maintained a majority stake in the postal companies to compensate for the loss of political control. The Federal Agency for Post and Telecommunications Deutsche Bundespost was established to regulate official and disciplinary measures and to ensure social benefits for civil servants, salaried employees, and workers. It also manages the federal government's shareholdings in the companies. The Post Office Employees' Health Insurance Fund remained in existence, but only accepts as members employees who were already employed by the Federal Post Office in 1994.

The federal government remains responsible for sovereign tasks in postal services and telecommunications. These sovereign tasks include ensuring comprehensive, sufficient, and appropriate service for all users. This encompasses issues of standardization and regulation, radio frequency management, the issuing of permits for radio installations, and preparedness for crises and disasters.

The Federal Ministry of Post and Telecommunications (BMPT) described the second Postal Reform, passed in the summer of 1994, as the central event of the year and as one of the biggest reforms in German economic history. The second Postal Reform was limited to privatization and did not change the competitive structure.

The postal reform had been the subject of controversial public debate; among the key points of contention was the question of the pension benefits of the three postal companies, which amounted to around 100 billion marks (see Pensionsrückstellung).

== Third Postreform (1996) ==
The third Postal Reform was also the subject of controversial public debate; one point of contention was, for example, the demand for a basic service.

The proposals envisioned an independent regulatory agency with the following tasks:

- Granting of licenses
- Formulation of conditions
- Exercise of control rights
- Ensuring the interconnection of competing networks (interconnection)
- Organization of the management of limited resources (frequencies, numbers, rights of way)
- Approval of the tariffs of the dominant network operator
- Observation of the quality of services
- Ensuring a universal service in the event of proven under-provision (market failure)
- Conducting conciliation proceedings pursuant to Section 10 of the Postal Services Ordinance

Finally, in 1998, the Regulatory Authority for Telecommunications and Postal Services (RegTP) was established to replace the Federal Ministry, and was responsible for regulating the technical aspects of the telecommunications market. In July 2005, the RegTP was renamed the Federal Network Agency for Electricity, Gas, Telecommunications, Postal Services and Railways, or BNetzA for short.

== Criticism ==
The reasons for full privatization, such as increased research pressure, improved customer service, or cost reductions, were often not achieved. In some cases, there have even been setbacks.

Only in mobile communications was privatization considered successful, with the first license for a private GSM network being tendered by the Federal Ministry for Post and Telecommunications in 1988. Deutsche Telekom, despite the existing and ongoing need, did not pursue the use of its own communications satellites and only very hesitantly expanded its fiber-optic networks, instead relying for too long on technical alternatives such as VDSL and VDSL2 vectoring . Due to pressure from the EU Commission, Telekom gradually sold its cable television network from 2000 to 2003 in the form of regional subnetworks, paving the way for the expansion of two-way communication and the offering of cable telephony and cable internet (Triple Play) via the German cable television network. After a few years, these subnetworks were increasingly merged until finally, on 18 July 2019, the competition authorities and the EU Commission gave their approval for the merger of Unitymedia and Kabel Deutschland. Since then, the British Vodafone Group has held a monopoly on cable television in Germany. Some suppliers of the German Federal Post Office (Deutsche Bundespost) ran into financial difficulties with Privatization. For example, the company fuba Communication lost its largest customer and had to file for bankruptcy in 1997 with only 700 employees remaining. Deutsche Post pushed ahead with the closure of post offices, resulting in a decline in nationwide coverage. For a long time, the parcel service was cross-subsidized by the letter service, and the Briefmonopol remained with Deutsche Post AG until 2005 or 2007. The Telekom share, known as the T-share, proved to be a losing proposition for many, and the previous advertising campaign featuring Manfred Krug did nothing to change that. The gradual takeover of Postbank by Deutsche Bank from 2009 until the merger in 2018 has brought more disadvantages than advantages for private and corporate customers. Postbank is of great importance for national and international payment transactions.

== Literature ==
- Jan-Christoph Hauswald: Der angewandte Vetospieleransatz. Bahnstrukturreform und Postreform II neu analysiert. Nomos, Baden-Baden 2015, ISBN 978-3-8487-1375-2.
- Post und Telekommunikation Deutsche Gesellschaft für Post- und Telekommunikationsgeschichte e. V. DGPT
- Hugo Dick, Hans H. Glismann, Ernst-Jürgen Horn: Zur Reform des Postwesens in Deutschland. Kiel, Kiel Institute of World Economics, 1995. (Kiel Working Paper. Nr. 688.)
