= Briefmonopol =

The Letter Monopoly (German: Briefmonopol) was a condition created after the German Postgesetz law was changed in 2005–2007 to allow an exclusive license to the German post office, Deutsche Post, for the transport of letters and catalog deliveries of up to 50 grams from the previous 100 grams. This limit only applied to a portion of the postal market in a service industry of some 1,000 providers, but it created a monopoly. The "Letter Monopoly" was often justified by the provision of universal service by the state, but some German cities wanted it to be abolished.

== Abolition of the letter monopoly ==
Since 1998, the German Federal Network Agency for Electricity, Gas, Telecommunications, Postal Service and Railways (Bundesnetzagentur, BNetzA) has licensed the professional transport of letters and mail, to which there was no weight restrictions. However, the relevant service providers were obliged to provide the so-called "higher-valued services" such as "same-day express delivery" or collection from the sender by the post office by 31 December 2007. Thus, additional costs that make it usually impossible for the licensees resulted in 'professional transport of letters' to set more favorably than the German post office AG in the "normal delivery" in comparison to the usual letter dispatch. With the cessation of the postal monopoly on 1 January 2008, the requirement to provide "higher-valued services" also fell away for the post office competitors.

Problems for competitors under the new arrangements include Deutsche Post being exempt from the value added tax, while its competitors are not. Furthermore, the post office did not have to pay accident insurance for its employees. Possible competitors lodged complaints with the German Federal Constitutional Court and/or the Federal Fiscal Court. The Hermes logistics group requested abolition of the value added tax obligation on 12 December 2007 with the Federal Department of Finance starting from 1 January 2008. The decision of the Ministry is still pending.

There are many enterprises in Germany, which offer the delivery of letters. Many of these are small and may be threatened by the new arrangements. In the long-term, as in other countries where the letter market was liberalized and/or completely opened, the former state enterprise Deutsche Post can expect to maintain a market share of over 90%. It is questionable whether a closed oligopoly can develop, in which a few different, well-financed enterprises can take part alongside Deutsche Post.

== Minimum wages for postal employees ==
In September 2007, there was a fierce debate about the minimum wage for the post office employees in Germany. The trade union ver.di came to an agreement with the postal services employer's association for a collective agreement specifying a minimum wage of 8.00 – 9.80 euro per hour. This was strongly criticized by the private post office enterprises. Deutsche Post used its leadership in the employer's association of the postal services to dictate minimum wages, which did not allow the private post office enterprises to fairly compete. These companies organized themselves in the employer's association that offered comparatively lower wages of 6.00 – 7.50 euro per hour for the new letter delivery service (NBZ). The German federal government chose not to interfere in the controversy.

== Chronology of legislative events ==
- In 2002 on the initiative of Federal Minister Werner Mueller, the German federal government amended the Postgesetz, so that the termination of the letter monopoly is further delayed from the end of 2002, through the end of 2007. The agreement between the CDU (opposition at that time) and the Red-Green coalition government came into existence just two minutes before the end of the period for the 'extension of the monopoly', at 11:58 pm.
- 12 November 2003: The German Federal Constitutional Court rules Deutsche Post's letter monopoly to be constitutional. Thus, it remained, with a restriction to the period 2005–2007.
- 13 December 2004: The Hessian minister of economics Alois Rhiel (CDU) and the minister of economics Lower Saxony Walter Hirche (FDP) announced an initiative in the German upper house Bundesrat to abolish the letter monopoly, by 2006.
- 21 March 2007: Minister of Finance Peer Steinbrück places the abolition of the letter monopoly in doubt since other European Union countries refused to allow foreign enterprises the right to deliver mail.
- 24 April 2007: The Grand Coalition (SPD/CDU) agrees not to seek change to § 51 of the Postgesetz again, on the monopoly of letters under 50 grams, thereby lapsing on 1 January 2008.

== See also ==
- Postreform
- In German Wikipedia: Postal companies.
