= TNT Post =

TNT Post may refer to:

- TNT Post Group, now known as PostNL
- TNT Post UK, now known as Whistl
