= DPAG (disambiguation) =

DPAG (Deutsche Post AG), now DHL AG, is a German multinational package delivery company.

DPAG may also refer to:

- Dunedin Public Art Gallery, in New Zealand
- Deutsche Petroleum-Aktiengesellschaft, established in 1904 for German oil activities in Russia
