= Kreis =

Kreis is the German word for circle.

Kreis may also refer to:

== Places ==
- Kreise, or Circle (administrative division), various subdivisions roughly equivalent to counties, districts or municipalities
  - Districts of Germany (including Kreise, Landkreise and Stadtkreise)
  - Former districts of Prussia, also known as Kreise
  - Kreise of the former Electorate of Saxony
  - Kreis (Habsburg monarchy), a former type of subdivision of the Habsburg monarchy and Austrian Empire
- Reichkreise, or Imperial Circles, ceremonial associations of several regional monarchies (Reichsländer) and/or imperial cities (Reichsstädte) in the Holy Roman Empire

== People ==
- Harold Kreis (born 1959), Canadian-German ice hockey coach
- Jason Kreis (born 1972), American soccer player
- Melanie Kreis (born 1971), German businesswoman
- Wilhelm Kreis (1873–1955), German architect

== Music and culture ==
- Der Kreis, a Swiss gay magazine
- Kreise (album), a 2017 album by Johannes Oerding

== See also ==
- Krai, an administrative division in Russia
- Kraj, an administrative division in Czechia and Slovakia
- Okręg, an administrative division in Poland
- Okres, an administrative division in Czechia and Slovakia
- Okrug, an administrative division of some Slavic states
