= Carl Halfar Uniformen-Mützen Fabrik =

German hat manufacturer

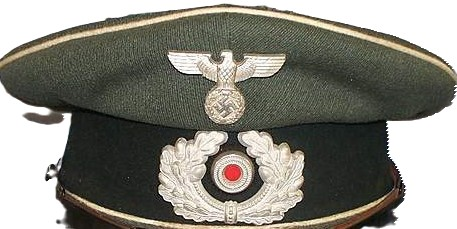
German Infanterie Visor Cap manufactured by Carl Halfar Factory in 1941

The Carl Halfar Military Visors Caps Factory was founded in 1890 by Carl Halfar (1865 Mörchingen-1936 Berlin). The company produced till 1982 all kinds of visors and caps for military units, authorities and civil companies.

== History ==
After Adolf Hitler rose to power in 1933, the company became one of the main military cap suppliers of the German army and Nazi organisations like the Africa Korps, the Waffen-SS, the Luftwaffe, Organisation Todt, and Hitler Youth.

The company was one of the first and main suppliers of Pith helmets and caps for the Africa Korps.

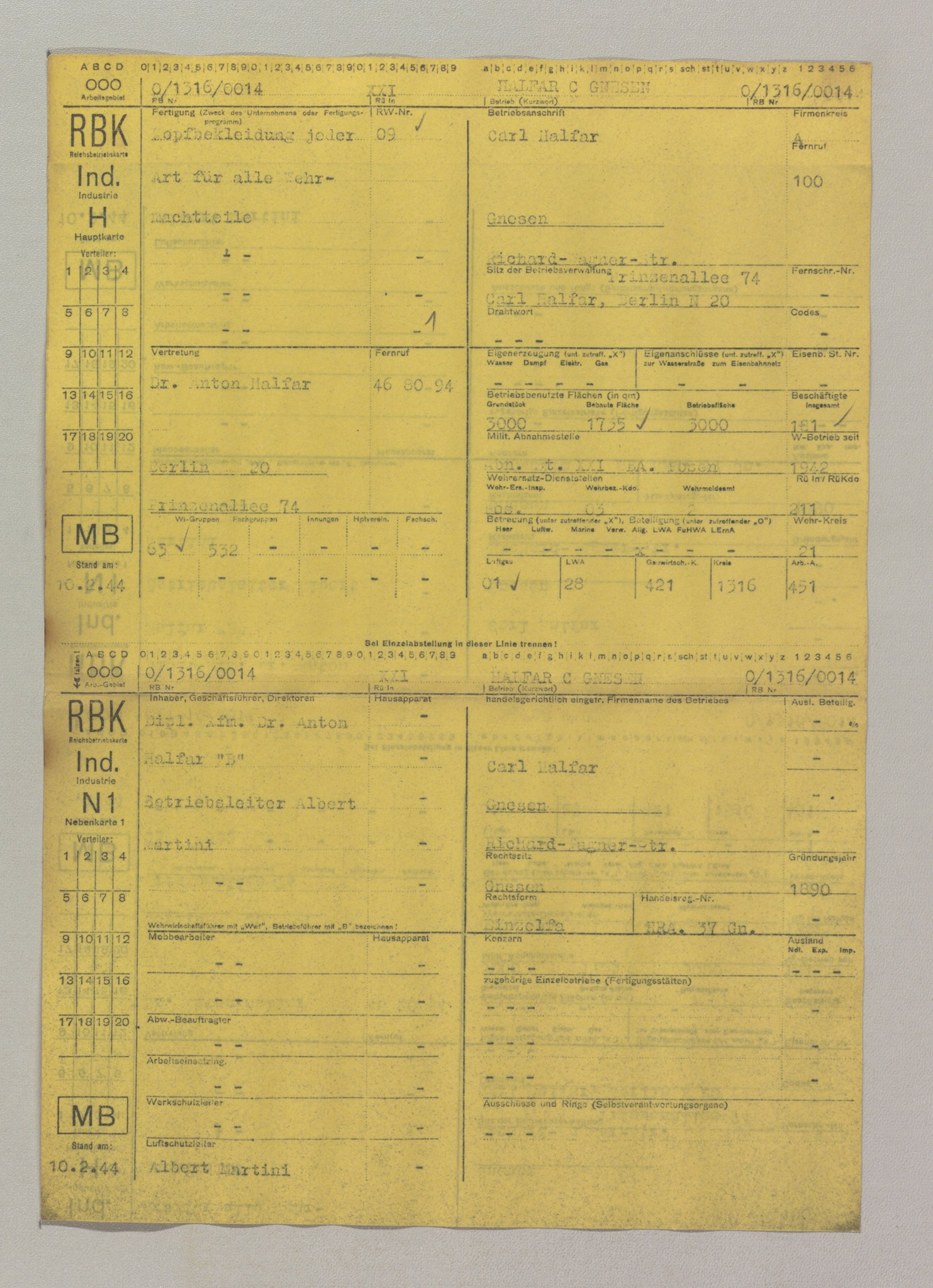
Reich business card index Carl Halfar Berlin 1944

Due to the growing production in 1937 they moved to a four-story factory building at Prinzenallee 74 in the Wedding district of Berlin. The sole owner and manager of the company in Berlin between 1935 and 1968 was Anton Halfar (*1907 (Berlin), †1968).Anton Halfar a party member and a business graduate since 1925, studied law at the Friedrich Wilhelm University in Berlin in 1929 and received his doctorate in law in 1934 from the law faculty at the University of Rostock.

From 1942 to 1945 the company opened a second manufacturing location in the city of Gniezno in occupied Poland under the name Carl Halfar Berlin and Gnesen Uniförmen-Mützen und Helmfabrik. Albert Martini was the operations manager in Gniezno. There the company worked together with the Armaments Command Inspection 211 of the Wehrmacht District XXI.

The Carl Halfar Uniform Cap Factory employed Jewish forced laborers between 1938 and 1945. Among many others also the Holocaust survivor Horst Selbiger (Berlin 1928) was used for forced labor in the Carl Halfar factory. To date Horst Selbiger has not been compensated for this.

After the end of the Second World War in 1945 the company manufactured visor caps for the Deutsche Post, the BVG, the Deutsche Bahn, the prison system, the Berlin police and the Federal Border Guard under the new name Ce-Ha Prima Carl Halfar Mützenfabrik. The company closed in 1983.
