= Post Tower =

Headquarters of the DHL Group

Coordinates: 50°42′56″N 7°07′48″E

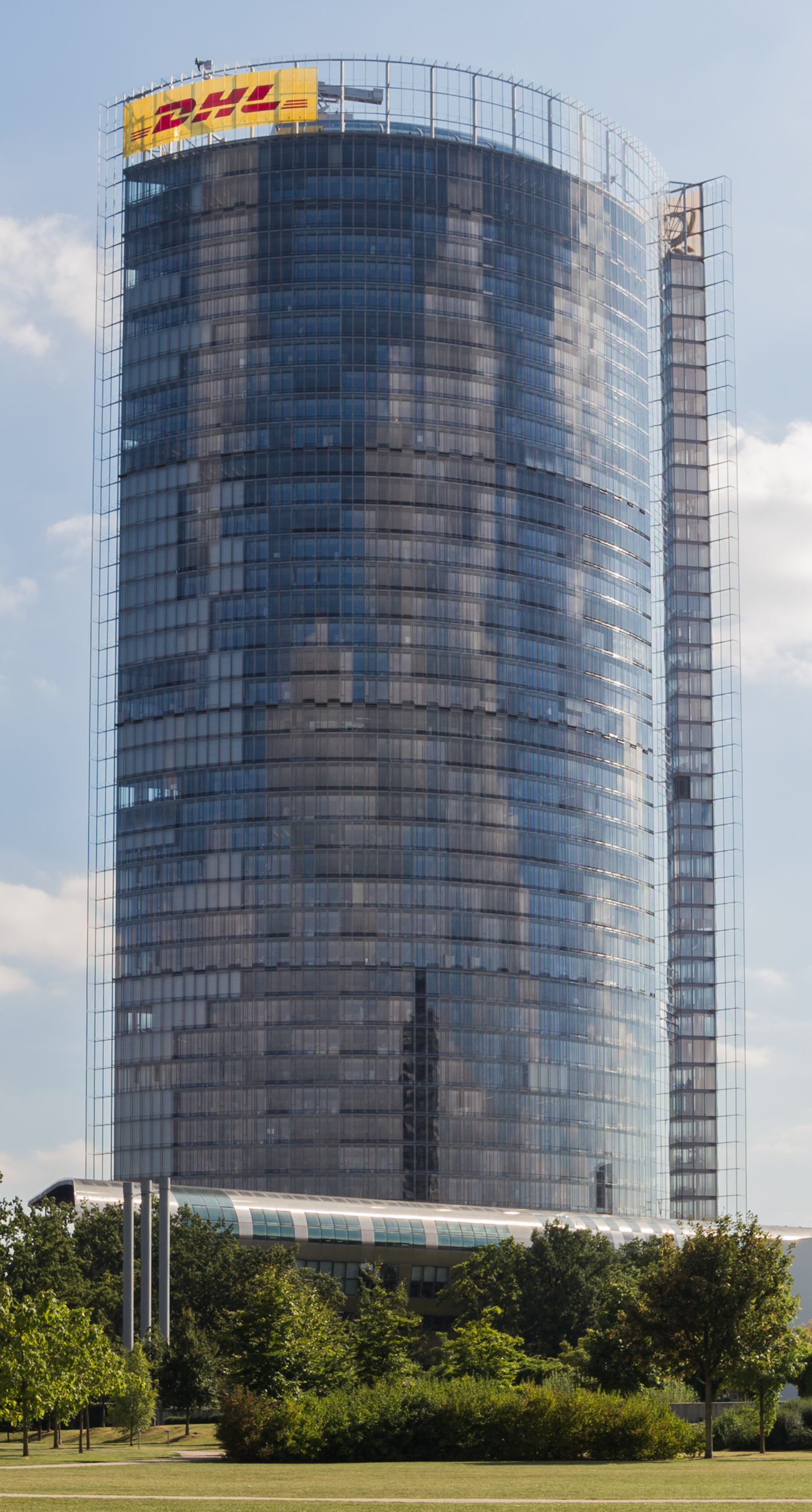
- Post Tower in 2013
- Interactive map of the Post Tower area

General information
- Type: Company Headquarters
- Architectural style: Postmodernist
- Location: Bonn, Germany
- Construction started: 2000
- Completed: 2002
- Cost: 78 Million €
- Owner: DHL Group (Deutsche Post AG)

Height
- Height: 162.5 m (533 ft)

Technical details
- Material: Steel, Concrete, Glass
- Size: 107,000 m^{2} (1,150,000 sq ft)
- Floor count: 41 Obergeschosse (Aboveground storeys); 5 Untergeschosse (Underground Storeys)
- Floor area: 7,000 m^{2} (75,000 sq ft)
- Lifts/elevators: 19

Design and construction
- Architect: Helmut Jahn
- Architecture firm: Murphy and Jahn

Post Tower is the headquarters of the logistic company DHL Group with the two brands: the Deutsche Post postal services and the DHL logistics service, located in Bonn, Germany.

Standing at 162.5 metres (533 ft) and 42 stories, it is the sixteenth tallest skyscraper in Germany, and the second tallest in Germany outside of Frankfurt am Main. Post Tower was designed by German-American architect Helmut Jahn and won the 2002 Silver Emporis Skyscraper Award.

== Design ==
The building is located at the river Rhine and in the center of the old parliament area of Bonn near the Deutsche Welle and has about 55,000 m^{2} (590,000 sq ft) of office surface. Construction took place from May 2000 to December 2002, with 80,000 m^{3} (2.8 million cubic feet) of concrete and 16,000 tons of structural steel used in the building's shell. The building dimensions are; height: 162.5 m (533 ft), width: 41 m (135 ft), length: 81.1 m (266 ft) (with ring walls 86.55 m (284.0 ft)), weight: 300,000 t. The building has the ground floor, 42 upper floors and 5 underground levels. The Tower has a surface area of 7,000 m^{2} (75,000 sq ft). The Tower is constructed as a steel-glass-building. The base of the Post Tower has the shape of two staggered semi-ellipses of two shifted circle segments. Most office walls, doors and the floors of skygardens and elevators are therefore made of 93,000 m^{2} (1,000,000 sq ft) glass used.

=== Climate control concept ===
A double-skin glass façade with a 120 cm (47 in) cavity between the external skin and the primary façade offers natural ventilation regulated by venetian blinds. The north-facing windows at the front are smooth, the glass windows on the south-facing façade are gently sloping to allow a better flow of air (see picture). Via a decentralized underground convector, the external air is sucked in from the space between the façades, then it is conditioned and fed back into the offices. The air also reaches internal areas of the building through doors and corridors.

The office air is filtered into the Sky Gardens, warms up those areas and then is filtered back outside via façade flaps on the east and west sides of the Sky Gardens. The double skin façade enables huge energy savings.

The benefits gained by the Post Tower in using up to 130 litres (29 imp gal; 34 US gal) of groundwater per second to heat and cool the concrete core. The remaining energy requirement is covered by connection to the district heating system, refrigerating equipment and heat pumps.

Post Tower
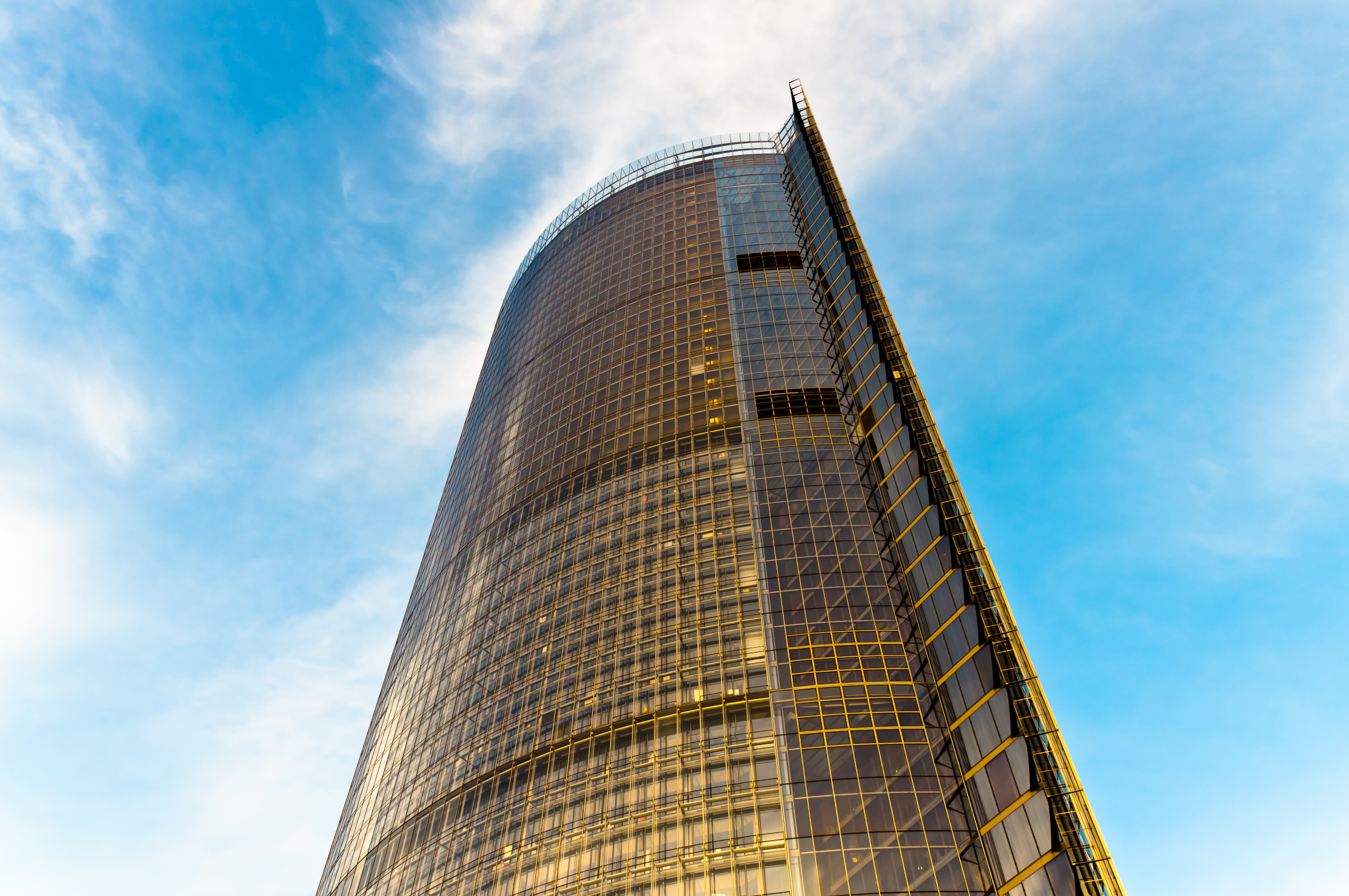
Post Tower at sunset, from below

Post Tower night in Christmas tree illumination

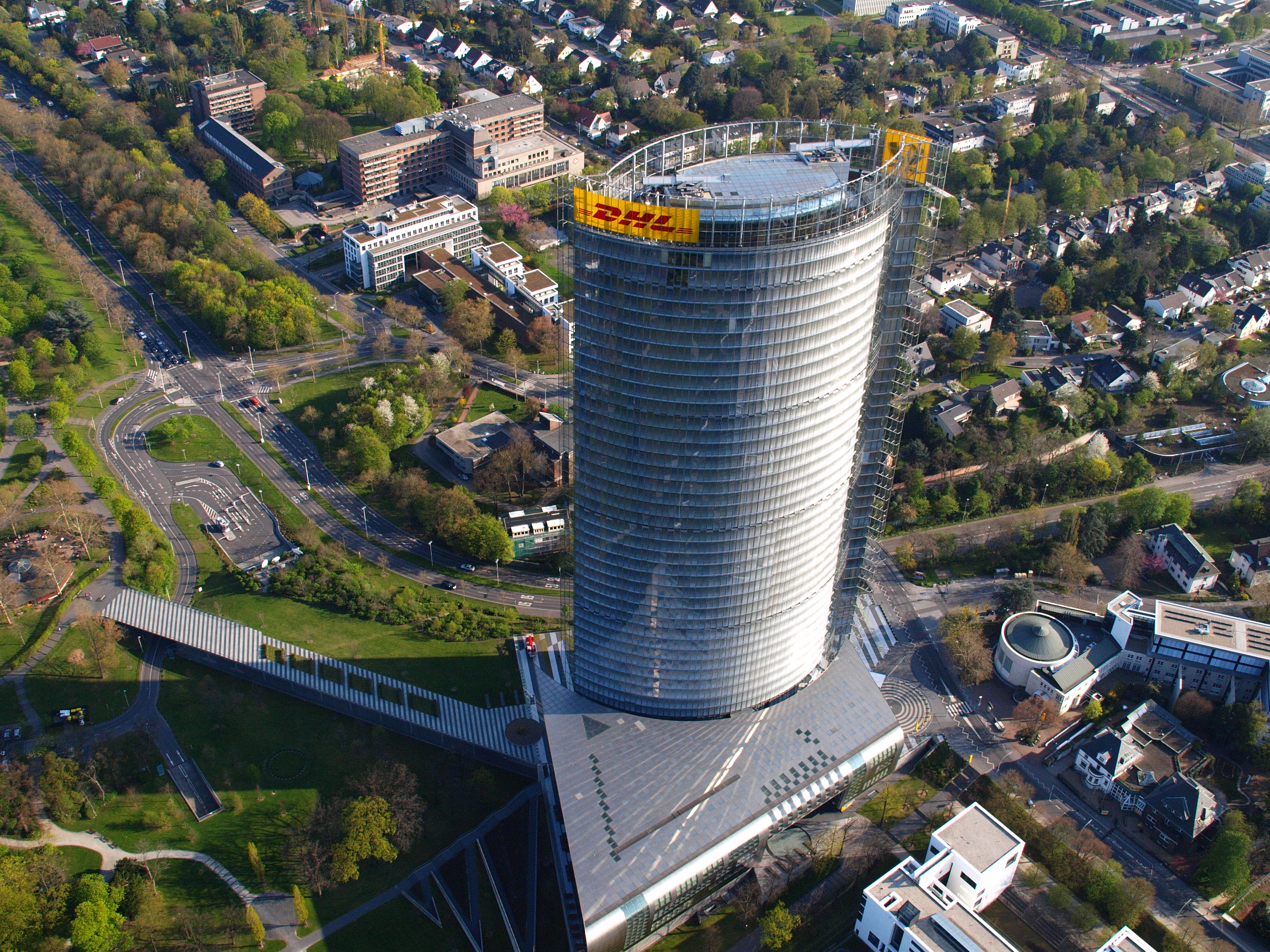
Post Tower, aerial view

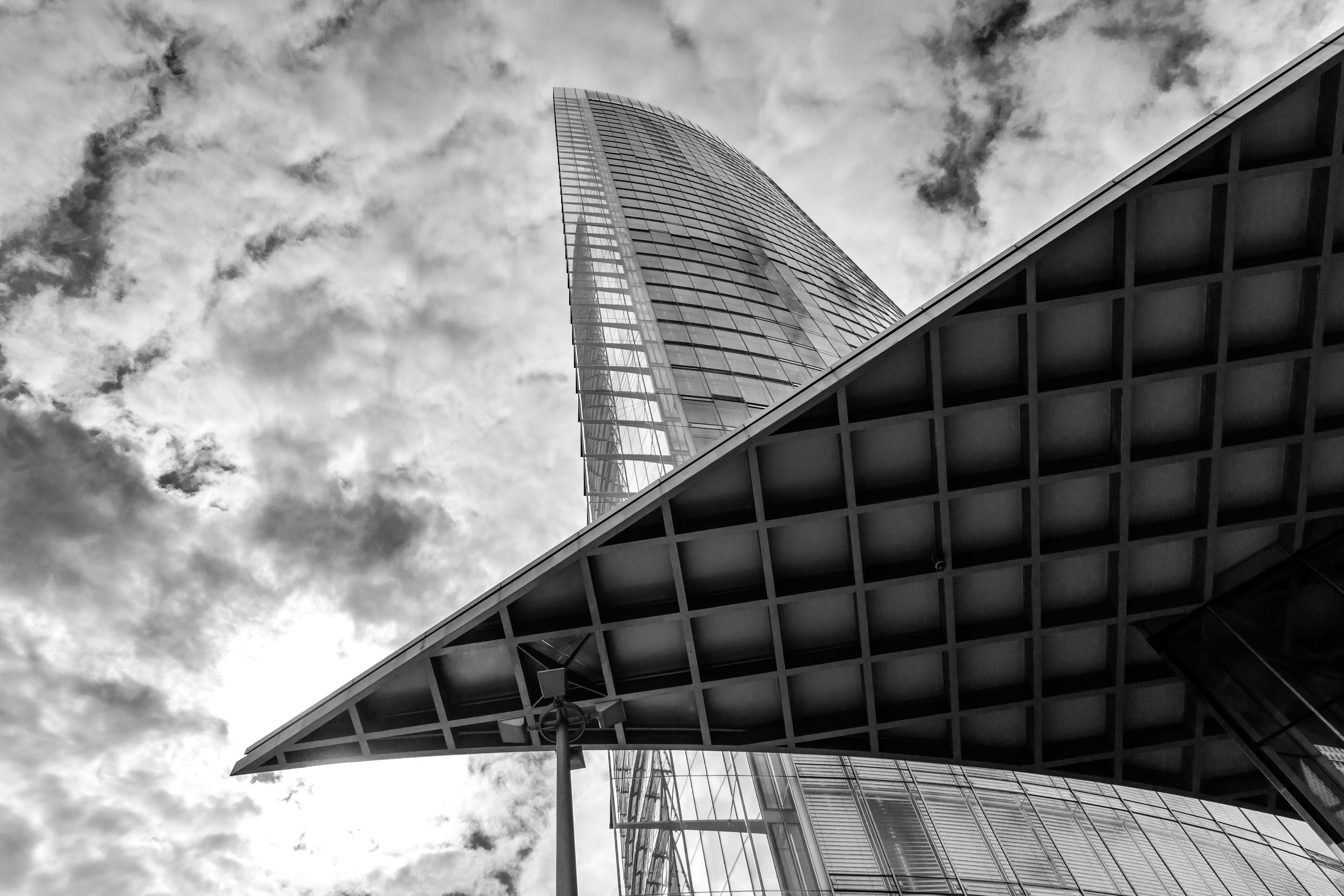
Post Tower from below
