= Herna Verhagen =

Dutch business executive

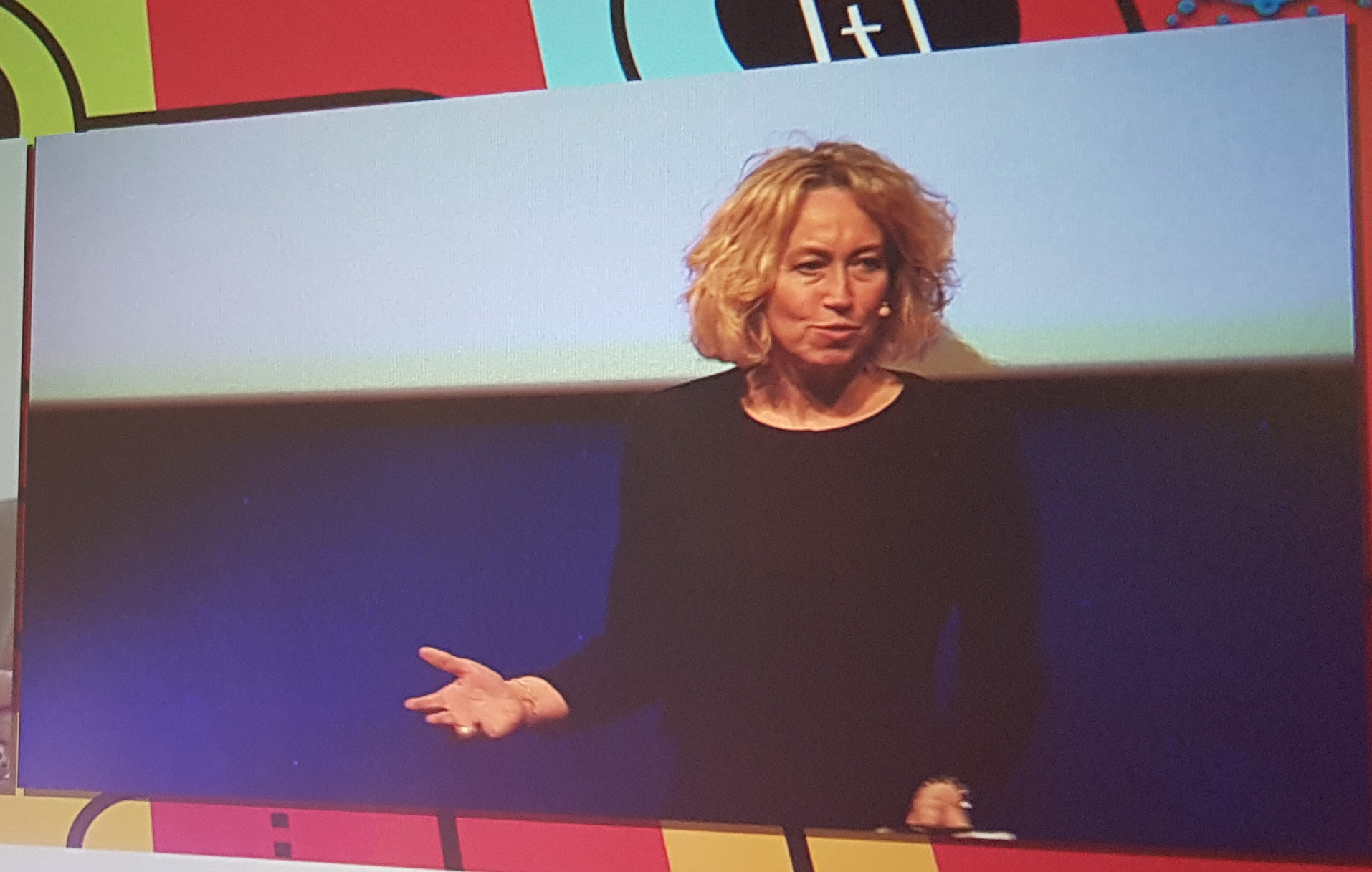
Verhagen speaking at the Health Valley congress in 2018

Hendrica Wilhelmina Petronella Maria Agatha "Herna" Verhagen (born 1966) is a Dutch business executive and the CEO of PostNL from 2012 to 15 April 2025. Verhagen is one of two women leading publicly listed companies in the Netherlands.

In 2020, Verhagen was appointed by NATO Secretary General Jens Stoltenberg to join a group of experts to support his work in a reflection process to further strengthen NATO's political dimension.

Verhagen has a master's degree in Law from Nijmegen University, and a master's degree in Human Resources from Tilburg University.
