= Green Paper on Postal Reform =

United Kingdom government draft plan

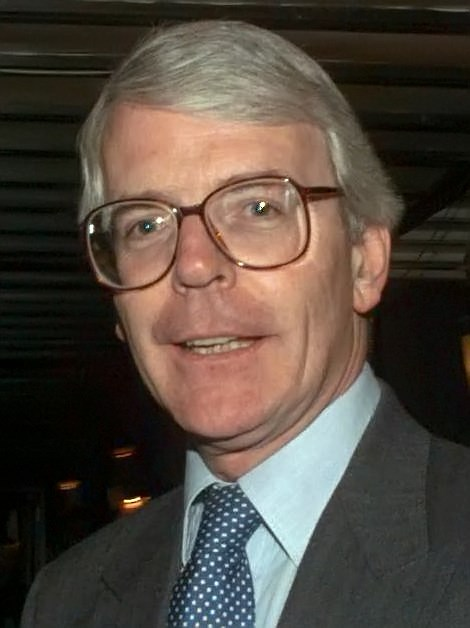
John Major's government proposed to privatise the post, as it had done with telecoms and was doing with rail.

The Green Paper on Postal Reform (Department of Trade and Industry, 1994) was a United Kingdom government draft plan to privatise and regulate the UK postal services. It set out various options, the key points of the plan being,

- writing into law a universal service obligation for 6-day a week delivery and "affordable" prices
- a new independent regulator enforcing standards in a new Citizens' charter
- keeping Post Office Counters (now Post Office Ltd) under the same arrangement, with 19,000 privately run offices and 800 Crown offices
- introducing more competition by further reducing the postal monopoly from £1

Then it laid out the different options for consultation of,

- a 100% privatisation in a Stock Exchange flotation to the public and employees, making the Royal Mail a public company,
- a provisional conclusion to privatise Royal Mail and Parcelforce, with the government retaining 49% of shares in private companies, or,
- giving more commercial freedom to Royal Mail and Parcelforce while leaving them in public ownership.

In the event, the plans did not go through. It met with support from Post Office managers, who advocated full sale because in their view this was the only way to achieve commercial freedom. It met with opposition from unions, much of the public and backbench Conservative MPs.

UK postal services were subsequently reformed with the Postal Services Act 2000 and the Postal Services Act 2011.

== Debate ==
On 19 May 1994 the Green Paper was to be presented to the House of Commons. The issue was taken up in Prime Minister's Question Time by Margaret Beckett as leader of the Labour Party opposition.

Mrs. Beckett: When the Post Office was not even mentioned in the Conservative party election manifesto and the effects of privatisation are causing chaos on British Rail and pushing up gas prices for ordinary families, why are the Government now looking to privatise the Post Office? The Prime Minister (Mr. John Major): As I said to the hon. Member for Neath (Mr. Hain) a moment ago, my right hon. Friend the President of the Board of Trade will make a full statement to the House about the Government's proposals in just a few moments. The right hon. Lady would be well advised to wait for that statement. As to British Rail, I think that she will find that, when it is operating as a privatised concern, as with the other privatised concerns, the service will be infinitely better than it was under nationalised control…'

Later that afternoon Michael Heseltine as The President of the Board of Trade and Secretary of State for Trade and Industry did present the proposals of the Green Paper. The Post Office, he began,

...handles some 60 million items of mail per day. Perhaps most important of all, it maintains a network of some 20,000 post offices which serve their local communities in a way that no other organisation can match.

The Government therefore made their consideration of the future of the Post Office subject to three vital and non-negotiable commitments, all of which we clearly set out in our manifesto. These are, first, the maintenance of a nationwide letter and parcel service with delivery to every address in the United Kingdom; secondly, a uniform and affordable structure of prices; and, thirdly, a nationwide network of post offices. Under no circumstances would we put those commitments at risk.

There are three principal businesses of the Post Office: Post Office Counters, the Royal Mail and Parcelforce…

The Counters business is essentially a partnership between the public and private sectors. The central core, which negotiates contracts and provides back-up services, is Government owned. But the vast majority of post offices – all but some 800 of the 20,0000 outlets – are privately run sub-post offices operating under an agency agreement… It also allows for private sector initiative at local level where the local post office is at the heart of local communities…’

I should like to comment on the relationship between Post Office Counters and the Royal Mail. The Royal Mail does not cross-subsidise post offices. Post Office Counters has been run as an independent business since 1986 and has been profitable throughout that period. Some post offices in rural areas do, of course, make a loss on a strict accounting basis. Post Office Counters has existing powers to support such post offices. Indeed, at the present time, 2,700, of which 1,800 are part time, are already supported by a flat fee, regardless of the business that they undertake. Post Office Counters and its clients see the nationwide network not as a liability, but as an asset which enables it to provide a unique service to villages and hamlets throughout the land. It enables the Benefits Agency, for example, to provide a service for the millions of people who have no bank accounts and live in remote areas. The business link with the Royal Mail is also important, although Members may be interested to know that only about 25 per cent. of Post Office Counters’ turnover comes from the Royal Mail. In any proposals, however, the Government will require the Royal Mail to continue to use post offices, as they do at present.

I shall now turn to the Royal Mail, which accounts for more than 70 per cent. of Post Office turnover. It is the most efficient postal service in Europe…’

...any legislation would set up a regulatory system to ensure that those obligations were properly defined and policed. The Government’s commitments to universal delivery, six days a week to every household, with a uniform and affordable tariff remain non-negotiable and would be written on the face of the legislation. I turn now to Parcelforce. I announced on 15 July 1992 the Government’s intention to privatise Parcelforce, which already operates in a fully competitive market… First… I can assure the House that, under any proposals that we finally adopt, stamps will continue to be exempt from value added tax.

Secondly, I can assure the House that all existing pension rights will be preserved in any case...

Thirdly… Her Majesty has agreed that, if a public sale option were to be pursued, Royal Mail would be given permission to use a depiction of Her Majesty’s head on postage stamps, to use the royal emblems, the Crown and the Cypher and to be registered as Royal Mail plc at Companies House.

We will wish to ensure in any change that the interests of the consumer continue to be protected by effective regulation.

There is common accord that major chance is needed if the Royal Mail is to meet the growing competitive threat that it faces.’

Then followed the debate, opened to the floor of the whole house. Some of the notable contributions are extracted.

Mr. Robin Cook (Livingstone): Is the real reason why he does not announce his decision today the fact that the Government are terrified of announcing the privatisation of the Post Office while the public still have a chance to vote on it at the forthcoming election?

I warn the President that he will never sell to the public the idea of privatising the Post Office. [Interruption.] I notice that Conservative Members did not try to sell it at the last general election, when they did not breathe a word of it in their manifesto. The President will not sell the idea to the public because the public know that privatisation would end the uniform tariff on postage. [Hon. Members: “No.”] Can the President tell us how the assurance that he has given the House today on the uniform tariff for postage differs from the assurance on the uniform tariff on gas when the Government privatised British Gas? Does he not know that, only last week, his Department gave the green light to British Gas to charge more to remote regions? For how many years after privatisation would it remain possible to post a letter at the same price from any part of Britain to any address in Britain?'

The President rightly acknowledged that the Post Office is a public sector success story. It provides the best letter service in Europe at one of the cheapest prices. It does not need a penny subsidy from the Treasury, but for 20 years has subsidised the Treasury with profits. Why cannot the Government accept that the simple logic of that success is that the best place for the Post Office is in the public sector?

Mr. Heseltine: The hon. Gentleman wants not a Green Paper but the reddest possible paper that he can lay his hands on.

Mr. Alex Carlile (Montgomery): Before selling the depiction of Her Majesty's head to the highest bidder, will he explain how he proposes to guarantee the integrity of the delivery service in rural areas? Does he propose that there should be competition within localities? If there is to be competition within localities, how on earth will the regulator be able to ensure a daily delivery by a postman or a postwoman for people living in remote rural areas?

Mr. Heseltine: The hon. and learned Gentleman has raised a number of important issues…

There will be a tough regulatory process to ensure that, if the single company option is adopted, the company will be statutorily charged with responsibility for delivering services.

Mr. Alex Carlile: Monopoly.

Mr. Heseltine: The hon. and learned Member says that that would be a monopoly. I wonder where he has been. The dilemma that we face is that an increasing range of services in every part of the country are competing with the Post Office. We see it ever [sic?] day – different services, international services, overseas companies. It is very important that, whatever we decide to do, the public should be assured, from the very beginning, of the absolute sine qua non: there will be a regular six-day-a-week delivery at a uniform tariff across the country.

Mr. Tony Benn (Chesterfield): Is the Minister aware that, for 334 years since 1660, the Royal Mail has been a public service, not only through the counters until quite recently, but through the people who called at everybody's house every day, and were a form of contact; that there is no justification for privatisation for commercial freedom, because, over the years, as he will know, the Post Office has developed, as with the giro, a completely new bank from within which was so successful that the Government sold it off; that the consequences of privatisation will be higher salaries for the management, which is why they want it, and poorer services and redundancies?

With great respect, after I heard the President give assurances about the pits 18 months ago, nothing that he says is believed, because he did not honour the assurances that he gave in 1992. Many people, and I am one of them, think that the sale of this asset to Tory businesses that funded the Conservatives' campaign will have a sniff of corruption about it from the very outset.

Mr. Heseltine: The great value of a Green Paper debate is that we shall have the opportunity of listening to the views of the right hon. Gentleman, which, in my view, have hardly changed through any of the 300 years to which he drew the House's attention.
