= Zoë Bread =

British social media personality

- Born: Zoë; 12 January 1995 (age 31)

Instagram information
- Page: zoë bread
- Followers: 636K

TikTok information
- Page: zoë bread
- Years active: 4
- Followers: 1.5 million
- Last updated: 10 October 2026
- Website: https://zoebread.com

Zoë (born 12 January 1995), known online as Zoë Bread (also known as Mary Greenburg), is a British social media personality, filmmaker, and designer. She is best known for creating TikTok videos in which she hides her face behind a bread mask.

Zoë Bread began posting on TikTok in February 2022 and has gained over 1.5 million followers as of February 2026. Her videos often feature humorous takes on local news and everyday situations. In 2025, she attracted national attention for a campaign challenging parking signage in Manchester, which led to a council review and refunds for fines. She also designs merchandise and uses recurring characters in her content.

== Personal life ==
Zoë was born on 12 January 1995. In addition to her Zoë Bread alias, she also uses other aliases online, including Mary Greenburg.

== Videos ==
On TikTok, Zoë makes satirical videos that typically document her daily life and trips around the country, and is sometimes spotted in the act due to her increased fame.

Her videos contain an unpredictable variety of comedic themes including taking headlines very seriously, including one Manchester Evening News Article called "The Greater Manchester village which will add ten years to your life – but has one downside" which Zoë responded to by trying to find the downside in person. Some of Zoë's other notable videos include a visit to Thorpe Park Leeds business park after "mistaking" it for the theme park near London, asking someone if they knew where Saw – The Ride was, searching for Bono in Norfolk, and jokingly saying she'd throw books around a porcelain museum in Worcester.

In 2024, Zoë had a brief conflict with an actor playing The Grinch on Hits Radio Manchester, after he allegedly copied a joke from her about the Wicked movie.

In 2025, Zoë started making videos fighting against parking fines issued by councils including Manchester and Liverpool City Councils. She also made a petition to the government to "Increase regulation of parking signage".

=== Collier Street Parking ===
In 2025, Zoë went viral for creating videos about a conflict with Manchester City Council over misleading parking signage on Collier Street after she received a £50 parking fine for using the wrong parking machine on Collier Street in Manchester. Zoë's series of videos included her challenging Manchester Mayor Andy Burnham live on BBC Radio Manchester, telephoning the council multiple times, submitting Freedom of Information requests, visiting the site in-person and performing "stakeouts". The road in question contained an official council-owned sign pointing to an official-looking payment terminal owned by a nearby private car park, whereas the council's terminal was located on the nearby Beaufort Street, which Bread claimed was misleading.

Her campaign resulted in the council refunding all fines given out on the street in the last 12 months, following the council's leader Bev Craig saying that the signs "could be clearer" and having the council review them. Zoë's campaign was praised by opposition councillors. Following the announcement by the council, Zoë began a "sign watch", documenting how long the council was taking to resolve the issue. During the campaign Zoë also raised concerns over the council's deadlines and handling of complaints.

Following ITV using images from Zoë's campaign and giving her a copyright strike, she created a series of videos criticising the company. In the videos, she called out ITV for being "hypocritical" for copyright striking her whilst saying in a TikTok that she's allowed to use the clips.

=== Liverpool City Council Parking ===
In August 2025, Liverpool City Council changed the times that visitors could park for free in the city centre. Zoë received a fine for parking on Bixteth Street outside of the free times, but claimed that the council did not adequately advertise the changes to the times due to some signs not being updated. In her video, Zoë showed that the “big white signs” in the car park showed charges until 7.30pm, however, the machine with a “really small” notice said 11.00pm.

Liverpool City Council initially refused her appeal, but later cancelled the fine and apologised after a parking warden admitted they follow the "big signs" in a video. The council later claimed that the parking charge was cancelled by mistake.

=== Astley Business Park ===
In 2026, Zoë began making videos about the development of several warehouses in Astley Business Park in Wigan. Zoë and local campaigners from the Astley Warehouse Action Group received a letter from the council threatening them with legal action following "serious allegations" being made about council staff online.

== Awards and recognition ==
- ITV bCreator Awards
  - TikTok Changemaker bCreator of the Year (2026)
