= Whistl =

Postal delivery company in the UK

Whistl Limited
- Type: Private
- Industry: Postal services
- Predecessor: PostNL
- Founded: 15 September 2014
- Headquarters: Marlow, Buckinghamshire, England, UK
- Number of locations: 14 depots
- Key people: Ian Keilty (CEO), Nick Wells (Executive Chairman)
- Services: Business mail services, Addressed mail sorting, Leaflet advertising, Parcel delivery, Third-party logistics, Contact centre services, Product sampling
- Owner: Management (82.5%); PostNL (17.5%)
- Number of employees: 2,400 (2023)
- Website: www.whistl.co.uk

The Whistl Group is a UK-based logistics and delivery management specialist headquartered in Marlow, Buckinghamshire, England. Its businesses provide domestic and international mail and parcel delivery management, unaddressed leaflet advertising, product sampling, eCommerce fulfilment, and contact centre services.

Overall, Whistl handles more than 3.6 billion mail and parcel items annually and has over 1 million square feet of fulfilment warehouse space across the United Kingdom.

In 2026, Whistl began operating from a warehouse at Astley Business Park, a development that had attracted significant local opposition before and after construction. Residents raised concerns about noise, traffic, lighting, flooding and the proximity of the warehouses to nearby homes. An independent audit commissioned by Wigan Council concluded that local residents had "no meaningful opportunity" to engage before the planning application was submitted, although it found the planning approval process itself had been lawful. Whistl stated that it had been working with residents and monitoring noise to mitigate the impact of its operations.

Whistl is a competitor and partner to other businesses involved in mail and parcel distribution, such as Royal Mail, UK Mail, DHL, Evri, Parcelforce, UPS and Yodel.

The company was a wholly owned subsidiary of the Dutch delivery company PostNL until October 2015, when a management buyout was completed. PostNL remained a minority shareholder.

== History ==
=== Origins and entry into the postal market ===
Whistl's origins date back to 1958, when the company was as a direct marketing business, Circular Distributors Limited (CD). Over 40 years later, in 2001, Circular Distributors Limited and its sister company at the time, Lifecycle Marketing, were acquired by the Dutch Post Office.

Renamed as TNT Post, the company was originally a subsidiary of the TNT Group. In May 2011, the group split to form TNT Express and PostNL. TNT Post UK became a subsidiary of PostNL, and an agreement was reached with TNT Express to continue using the TNT name until the end of 2014.

Following market deregulation, TNT Post UK entered the final-mile postal delivery market, challenging a monopoly that had existed for over 500 years.

Its end-to-end letters service began delivering in West London in April 2012, later rolling out to Manchester and Liverpool.

During this period the company rebranded as Whistl in September 2014.

In May 2015, Whistl announced that it would suspend end-to-end postal deliveries in London, Liverpool, and Manchester after the private equity investor LDC, a division of Lloyds Bank, decided not to fund further expansion citing "ongoing changes in UK postal market dynamics and the complexity of the regulatory landscape".

Whistl confirmed on 10 June 2015 that the service would formally end, with 1,800 jobs at risk of redundancy.

The company concentrated on processing and sorting mail and parcels, and reverted to using Royal Mail's "final mile" delivery service rather than its own. In October 2015, Whistl's management completed a buyout of the company from PostNL, although PostNL retained a 17.5% holding.

=== Expansion ===
In the following years Whistl diversified from its postal heritage to focus on UK and international parcel delivery, outsourced fulfilment and contact centre services.

Whistl acquired Prism DM in July 2017 and later rebranded the business as Whistl Fulfilment. This was followed by the 2018 acquisition of the Spark Ecommerce Group, a privately-held fulfilment and contact centre company based in Gateshead.

In June 2018, Whistl expanded its mail and parcels divisions with the purchase of Nottingham-based Parcelhub and its sister company, Mail Workshop.

This was followed in May 2019 by the acquisition of warehouse space in Harmondsworth, near Heathrow. The space was previously held by Keymail UK Ltd and would act as Whistl’s ‘international gateway’ for mail and parcel services in and out of the UK.

Whistl and UKP Worldwide teamed up in April 2020, to offer customers a seamless customs clearance service for mail and parcel customers who operate internationally.

Also in 2020, Whistl acquired the south-west based Clientbase Fulfilment and in the following year announced plans for three new depots, including a 300,000 ft^{2} site based within the ‘Golden Logistics Triangle’ at Magna Park, Lutterworth.

In 2021, Whistl launched the Posthub sub-brand to supplement its mail business and support businesses and organisations sending direct mail and advertising mail. This was quickly followed by the acquisition of Relish, a product sampling agency.

The autumn of 2024 saw Whistl unify its parcel offering under the Parcelhub brand, utilising the wider Whistl network and Parcelhub’s network of micro-hubs.

== Timeline ==
The Whistl Group has become a £770m revenue business, employing over 2,000 employees. The following are key dates in the company’s history:

- October 1958: Circular Distributors Limited (CD), a direct marketing business, is founded.
- April 2001: Circular Distributors Limited and its sister company, Lifecycle Marketing, are sold to TNT Group, remaining under the leadership of Nick Wells.
- April 2006: Circular Distributors Limited rebrands as TNT Post.
- September 2014: TNT Post UK rebrands as Whistl.
- October 2015: Management buyout (MBO) completed with PostNL retaining a minority shareholding.
- July 2017: Whistl acquires Prism DM to grow its fulfilment division.
- June 2018: Whistl purchases Parcelhub, a multi-carrier delivery management business.
- December 2018: Clientbase Fulfilment is acquired by Whistl.
- May 2019: Whistl opens its international gateway for export and import traffic.
- February 2021: Whistl launches the Posthub sub-brand for businesses sending direct mail.
- November 2021: Bristol-based product sampling agency Relish is acquired by Whistl.
- February 2023: Whistl is awarded Superbrand status by the world’s largest independent arbiter of brands across 90 countries.
- July 2023: Whistl announces plans to go Net-Zero by 2045.
- September 2024: Net-Zero targets are validated by the Science-Based Targets initiative (SBTi).
- September 2024: Parcelhub becomes the unified parcels brand of the Whistl Group.
- February 2025: Whistl retains its EcoVadis Gold rating and is named amongst the top 3% of companies assessed for its environmental performance and corporate social responsibility.

== Brands ==
The Whistl Group comprises the main Whistl brand and various sub-brands for its different services:

- Whistl: the brand name for bulk mail, door drop media, fulfilment and contact centre solutions.
- Parcelhub: multi-carrier parcel delivery management, across the UK and internationally.
- Posthub: mail management support for businesses and organisations sending direct mail.
- Leafletdrop: a self-service leaflet advertising tool, with campaign design, targeting and delivery capability to UK households.
- Relish: a product sampling agency that supports brands and retailers with their sampling campaigns.
- Ethical Superstore: an online retailer providing eco-friendly alternatives for everyday items.

== Locations ==
Whistl operates offices, depots, warehouses and contact centres across the United Kingdom. Locations include: Bedford, Belfast, Boldon, Bristol, Glasgow, Lutterworth, Northampton, Paignton, Wellingborough and Wrangaton. The Group head office is in Marlow, Buckinghamshire.

In 2026, Whistl moved its northern operations from Bolton to Astley Business Park in Wigan, a large warehouse development built alongside a residential area. The relocation has proved controversial amongst local residents, with concerns regarding excessive noise and light pollution. Subsequent professional noise monitoring commissioned by Astley Warehouse Action Group, a group working to oppose the warehouse development, has found that measured noise levels are higher than those predicted in the development's original noise assessment. In addition, Whistl's interim licence for the site, which includes restrictions on vehicle noise, may conflict with the DVSA's legally required safety checks, which require drivers to test their vehicle's horn before driving for the first time each day. This apparent conflict has raised further concerns amongst local residents about the suitability of the location for HGV operations.

== See also ==
- Postal services in the United Kingdom
