= Astley Business Park =

Business park in Astley, Wigan, England

- Interactive map of Astley Business Park
- Coordinates: 53.5054877°N 2.4418795°W
- Developer: TanRo (construction), Barry Chinn Associates (landscapes)
- Owner: PLP
- Architect: PHP Architects
- No. of tenants: 2
- Size: 356,132 square feet (33,085.7 m^{2})
- Website: https://www.astleybusinesspark.co.uk

Astley Business Park (also known as PLP Astley) is a major logistics and warehousing hub in Greater Manchester. Located in Astley, Greater Manchester near the M60 and M61, the site consists of 356,132 square feet (33,085.7 m^{2}) of industrial warehouse space. The complex was constructed by TanRo, and designed by PHP Architects.

Developers claim that the buildings meet BREEAM Excellent certification and EPC A rating, as well as using Solar Power and the UK Net Zero Carbon Buildings Standard for construction.

The development was widely opposed by local residents, with an estimated 70 to 90 oppositions registered with the planning committee.

== History ==
=== 2006–2024 ===
The site was allocated for employment use in 2006, and planning permission for the warehouses was approved in 2017. Following a lapse of planning permission, it was re-submitted in 2023 and approved in 2024 alongside approval for 100 homes to be built in the area.

=== 2025 ===
In January 2025, the site was acquired by PLP from Peel Waters, a subsidiary of The Peel Group.

In July 2025, delivery company Whistl signed a 15-year lease of a 140,000 square feet (13,000 m^{2}) unit at the site, which the developer called a "strong endorsement" of the scheme. The company later applied for a Goods Vehicle Operator's License to keep up to 60 vehicles and 95 trailers at the site.

Construction began in 2025, and was due for completion in early 2026.

In September 2025, local residents formed the Astley Warehouse Action Group to dispute the construction and began fundraising for a judicial review of the plans. It was also reported that Greater Manchester Mayor Andy Burnham met with Wigan councillors to discuss the plans. Whilst Burnham did not comment on the meeting, Wigan Councillor James Fish said that the mayor wanted to understand how the decision was made by the planning committee. Later in October 2025, Councillor Fish resigned from the planning committee after voting against approving the plans, saying that he believed it was in the "best interests of myself, the residents I represent, the planning committee and the local planning authority".

During construction, residents claimed that noise from the site reached as high as 82.9 dB, which is above the recommended maximum limit of 75 dB. Teachers at Garrett Hall Primary School next to the development claimed that their voices had been "drowned out" by the sound of the works.

In November 2025, The Astley Warehouse Action Group, a local group opposing the warehouses, held a demonstration in Wigan town centre in opposition to the development. The group also requested a "Stop Notice" to allow for an environmental assessment to be conducted, which was refused. In the same month, Wigan Council agreed to an audit of the planning decision.

In December 2025, footpaths and three homes around the site flooded which residents blamed on the warehouses. During the flooding, a protestor went down the path in a canoe, and Councillor Fish called for an "immediate halt" to the construction.

=== 2026–present ===
In 2026, TikToker Zoë Bread began making videos in support of the action group.

In January 2026, an independent audit of the development commissioned by the council and run by POS Enterprises found that residents of the local area were given "no meaningful opportunity" to engage with the proposals prior to submission of the planning application, and that the consultation process was "wholly inadequate". Wigan Council responded to the audit, saying that it confirmed they had followed national planning guidance, which was supported by the report. However, the council also acknowledged that the process could be improved and that it will learn from the planning process of this site. Greater Manchester Mayor Andy Burnham called for a "fair remedy" for residents following the audit.

In March 2026, Wigan Council sent warning letters to the Astley Warehouse Action Group and Zoë Bread, threatening them with legal action following "serious allegations" being made about council staff online.

Whistl moved into the site in July 2026. The relocation has been controversial amongst local residents, with concerns regarding excessive noise and light pollution. Subsequent noise monitoring commissioned by Astley Warehouse Action Group found that measured noise levels are higher than those predicted in the development's original noise assessment. Whistl's interim licence for the site, which includes restrictions on vehicle noise, may conflict with the DVSA's legally required safety checks, which require drivers to test their vehicle's horn before driving for the first time each day.

Grace Overseas also planned to move into a unit at the park later in 2026. After announcing the move, the company released a statement saying that they would not store any hazardous materials at the site.

In August 2026, Whistl released a statement on their use of the site, saying "We understand that our arrival at Astley Business Park has raised questions and concerns within the local community. We take this feedback seriously and are committed to listening, engaging openly and taking practical steps to minimise the impact of our operations wherever possible." During an interview with the BBC, Mayor of Greater Manchester Bev Craig said that planning rules should be reviewed following the construction and subsequent controversy.

In September 2026, Whistl paused overnight operations following noise complaints from neighbours, who shared that noise coming from the site was above planning estimates and limits.

In November 2026, the traffic comissioner held a two-day inquiry to allow residents to object to Whistl's application to house 60 HGVs and 95 trailers at unit 2.
