= Parcelhero =

British transport support company

- Type: PLC
- Industry: Transport support services
- Founded: 2009; 17 years ago
- Founders: Roger Sumner Rivers
- Headquarters: London, United Kingdom
- Number of locations: 1
- Area served: Global
- Key people: Roger Sumner Rivers (CEO)
- Number of employees: 102 (2025)
- Website: www.parcelhero.com

Parcelhero, a member of the Parcelhero Group, is a UK-based online courier comparison and delivery booking service that simplifies the process of shipping parcels domestically and internationally for both individuals and businesses.

Founded in 2009 by Roger Sumner Rivers, Parcelhero aggregates the services of major global couriers, including DHL, UPS, DPD, FedEx, Parcelforce, and EVRi, to provide customers with a wide range of delivery options, from same-day and express services to economy shipping. The platform allows users to compare prices, transit times, and service levels across multiple carriers, often securing discounts off standard rates.

Parcelhero offers flexible collection and drop-off options, with door-to-door courier services as standard and thousands of local drop-off points available across the United Kingdom. The service covers shipments to over 220 countries, supports the preparation of shipping documents, and provides comprehensive tracking for every parcel.

Parcelhero serves more than 100,000 customers annually worldwide, and has built a strong reputation for combining cost savings with a high standard of service. The company employs people in many countries, including the UK, India, South Africa and the USA.

== History ==
The genesis of Parcelhero began when Deliver Plus Ltd was incorporated on 9 March 2005. Deliver Plus operated as a micro-SME logistics website.

Using the knowledge and experience gained through operating Deliver Plus, Sumner Rivers decided to branch into the consumer logistics market. ParcelHero.com was incorporated on 1 September 2009, as a parcel price aggregator website.

In 2012, Parcelhero announced the world's first automated carrier selection technology. Using an early iteration of its ParcelVision technology to monitor carrier delivery performance statistics by postcode, Parcelhero automatically selects the optimal carrier for each individual shipment.

Deliver Plus Int'l Group incorporated on 4 April 2013. The Group is registered with Companies House as providing transportation support activities and information technology service activities.

On September 10, 2013, Parcelhero announced the successful acquisition of British courier firm Fast Lane Couriers, becoming the second B2C company in the group.

Deliver Plus Int'l Group was renamed ParcelHero Group on January 12, 2015.

On 1 February 2019, the Fast Lane Couriers division was renamed Parcel Compare Ltd (usually styled Parcelcompare).

Parcelhero.com placed at #497 on the 2019 Financial Times' FT1000: Europe's Fastest-Growing Companies index.

In November 2021, Parcelhero accepted an undisclosed capital investment from Firmament Group.

Between 2012 and 2022, Parcelhero reported a market-leading compound annual growth rate of 17%.

In 2022 Parcelcompare ranked #470 on the 2022 edition of the Financial Times' FT1000: Europe's Fastest Growing Companies index.

Parcelcompare climbed to #411 on the seventh edition of the FT1000: Europe's Fastest Growing Companies index by the Financial Times.

In February 2024, Parcelhero announced Parcelhero Pro, a B2B SaaS platform enabling businesses to ship in bulk, optimise costs, and completely outsource their after-sales customer support. The platform integrates with major e-commerce platforms and marketplaces like Shopify, eBay, and Amazon through API to create a central hub for efficient order and shipping management.

Parcelcompare was ranked #624 on the 2024 FT1000: Europe's Fastest Growing Companies index by the Financial Times.

== Parcelhero group members ==
=== Parcelhero ===
Founded in 2009, Parcelhero has grown to become one of the UK's largest parcel price comparison sites. Parcelhero aggregates the services of major global couriers, including DHL, UPS, DPD, FedEx, Parcelforce, and EVRi, to provide customers with a wide range of delivery options, from same-day and express services to economy shipping

=== Parcelcompare ===
Founded in 1988 as an international courier company, Fastlane International joined the Parcelhero Group in 2013, becoming an online courier comparison and delivery booking service. Fastlane International was renamed Parcelcompare in 2019. Today Parcelcompare serves more than 40,000+ customers from over 80 countries offering services including UK courier services, international shipping, same day delivery, and corporate courier services.

=== DeliverPlus ===
Founded in 2005, DeliverPlus is a fully managed service, simplifying shipping and logistics for business customers.

=== Alfasent ===
Previously, Alfasent operated warehousing and storage facilities for Parcelhero's air transport activities. The company was dissolved on 25 February 2020.
