= Prime Vision =

Dutch computer vision company

Prime Vision B.V.
- Type: Besloten vennootschap
- Industry: Postal Automation and Recognition Software Development
- Founded: 1956 (origins) 2003 (standalone company)
- Headquarters: Delft, Netherlands
- Area served: Worldwide
- Key people: Eddy Thans (CEO)
- Services: Video coding (postal market) Intelligent character recognition Optical character recognition Pattern recognition
- Revenue: €5.0 million (2012)
- Owner: 60% PostNL; 40% First Dutch Innovations
- Number of employees: 100 (2017)
- Website: primevision.com

Prime Vision B.V. is a Dutch computer vision and robotics company specialized in sorting processes for the postal, logistics and e-commerce markets. The company is headquartered in Delft, the Netherlands, and its shareholders are PostNL and First Dutch Innovations (FDI).

== History ==
Logo as of 2005
Logo as of 2012

In 1956 what would become Prime Vision starts life as a research department of the PTT.

A few years later, in 1961, The High Yield Character Reader (HYCR), the core technology of Prime Vision, was invented. The HYCR has been developed for capturing hand written as well as machine printed text and has found a particular niche as the basis for secondary OCR engines. In this role, Prime Vision's HYCR-based systems complement other OCRs that have been principally designed for machine printed text. With the systems working in tandem the net read rate of letters, flats and parcels is boosted significantly. HYCR is now in use throughout the world and includes various language sets, including Hebrew, Chinese and Tamil.

In 2003 KPN Research (formerly known as PTT) was acquired by TNO Companies. Additional investments prepared the company for its first sales outside the Netherlands.

One year later, TNT (now known as PostNL) acquired 60% of the shares of Prime Vision from TNO. Additional investment led to an independent entity Prime Vision BV.

The majority of the TNO Companies shares are taken over in 2017 by First Dutch Innovations who became the new shareholder of Prime Vision.
