= DHL Group =

German logistics company

DHL AG

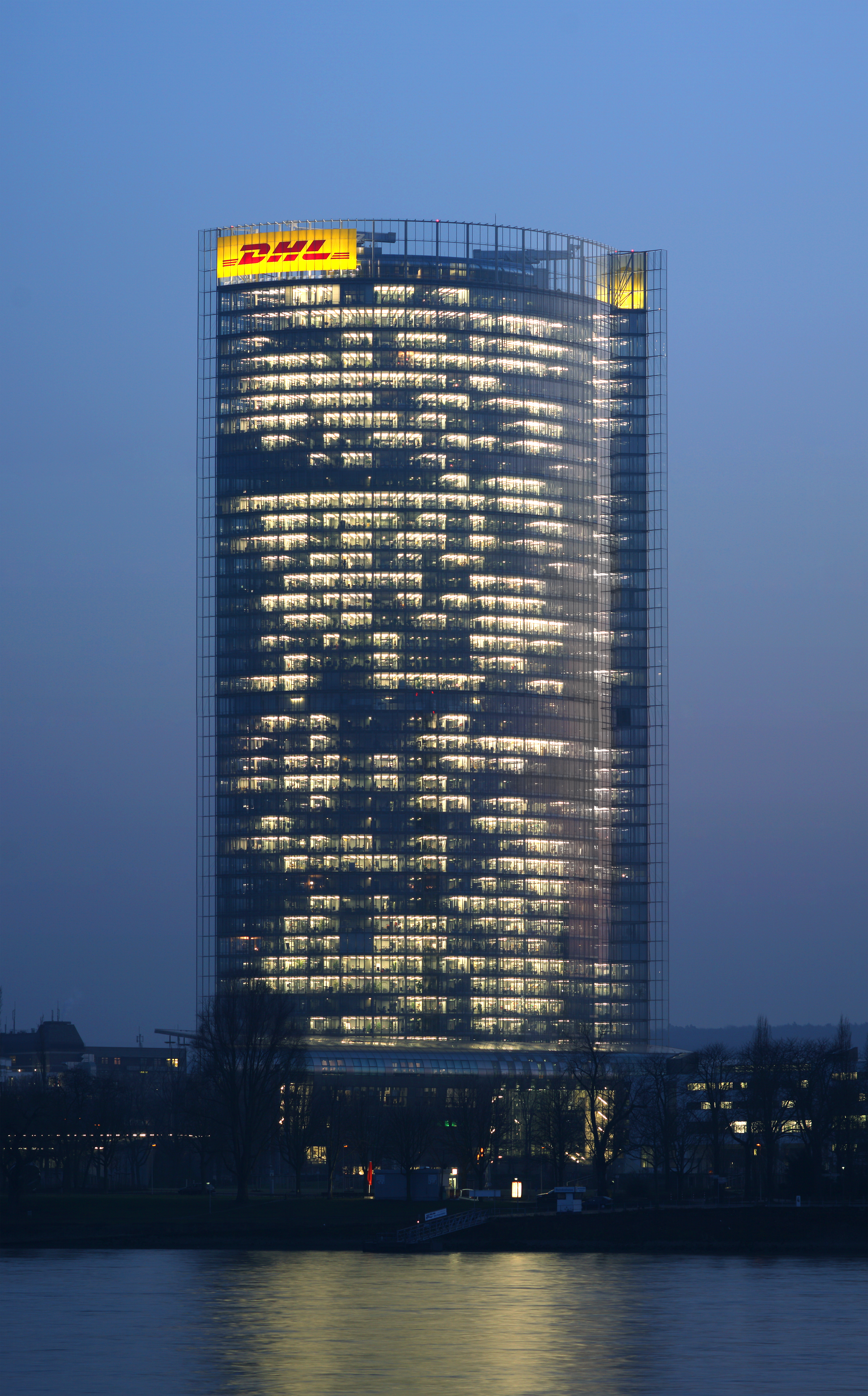
- Post Tower in Bonn
- Trade name: DHL Group
- Type: Public company
- Traded as: FWB: DHL; DAX Component
- ISIN: DE0005552004
- Industry: Postal services
- Founded: 2 January 1995; 31 years ago
- Headquarters: Post Tower, Bonn, Germany; 50°42′56″N 7°07′48″E
- Area served: Worldwide
- Key people: Katrin Suder (Chair of the supervisory board); Tobias Meyer (CEO); Melanie Kreis (CFO)
- Brands: Deutsche Post; DHL
- Services: Letter post, parcel service, EMS, delivery, freight forwarding, third-party logistics
- Revenue: ▼€81.76 billion (2023)
- Operating income: ▲€8.43 billion (2022)
- Net income: ▲€5.42 billion (2021)
- Total assets: ▲€63.59 billion (2021)
- Total equity: ▲€19.50 billion (2021)
- Owners: Federal Government of Germany via KfW bank (21%)
- Number of employees: 600,278 (2022)
- Website: group.dhl.com

Final logo for Deutsche Post DHL Group, used until 2023

DHL AG, trading as DHL Group, is a German multinational package delivery and supply chain management company headquartered in Bonn, Germany. It is one of the world's largest courier companies. The postal division, Deutsche Post, delivers 61 million letters each day in Germany, making it Europe's largest such company. The trade name's eponymous parcel division DHL is a wholly owned subsidiary claimed to be present in over 220 countries and territories. DHL Group was the largest logistics company worldwide in 2022.

DHL Group is the successor to the German mail authority Deutsche Bundespost, the oldest modern postal service in the world, tracing its roots to the Middle Ages Kaiserliche Reichspost. It was privatized in 1995 and became a fully independent company in 2000. Since its privatization, Deutsche Post has significantly expanded its business area through acquisitions. In late 2014, the group acquired StreetScooter GmbH, a small manufacturer of electric vehicles. Two years later, the group acquired UK Mail, a business-focused postal service in the UK for US$315.5 million (£243 million). The former company became a division of the Deutsche Post European parcel network.

The 2016 earnings of Deutsche Post DHL Group before interest and taxes (EBIT) was €3.491 billion (up 44.8 percent over 2015), with a net profit of €2.64 billion on revenue of €57.334 billion. Return on equity, before taxes, was 27.7 percent. The group's long term credit rating, in November 2016, was BBB+ with a Stable outlook per Fitch's.

DHL Group is listed on the Börse Frankfurt (Frankfurt Stock Exchange) as DHL and is in the Euro Stoxx 50 stock market index. In 2016, 20.5% of the group's shares were held by the state-owned KfW bank; 79.5% were freely floating: 65.6% held by institutional and 10.8% by private investors.

== Recent history ==
DHL Group has become a large, world-wide company in about two decades. The following are significant dates in the development into its current form.

- 2 January 1995: Deutsche Bundespost Postdienst becomes Deutsche Post AG; this is the company's privatization. The government of Germany still owns a large share of the company; the state development bank KfW owns 50 percent.
- 1998: Deutsche Post begins acquiring shares in DHL International.
- 1999: Deutsche Post World Net acquires the Dutch distribution company Van Gend & Loos from Nedlloyd and in 2000 the Swiss distribution company Danzas.
- 20 November 2000: Deutsche Post AG becomes a fully private company, with a new board of directors, in an IPO listed on the Frankfurt Stock Exchange. The government of Germany sells one third of its shares and KfW bank sells some of its shares.
- December 2002: Deutsche Post AG acquires the remaining shares in DHL International.
- August 2003: The company acquires the Seattle-based Airborne Express (est. 1946). The company integrates Van Gend & Loos, Danzas, Airborne Express, and its own EuroExpress into DHL to form DHL Express.
- December 2005: The group acquires the logistics company Exel in the UK, a £3.7 billion (€5.5 billion) takeover; Exel provided transport for corporate customers.
- 2006: DHL GlobalMail UK merges with Mercury International.
- December 2014: The group acquires StreetScooter GmbH, a small manufacturer of electric vehicles in Aachen, Germany.
- December 2016: The group completes the purchase of UK Mail, a business-focused postal service - "one of the largest integrated parcels and mail operations in the U.K." – for US$315.5 (£243) million. The former company becomes a division of the Deutsche Post European parcel network, although its web site reveals only a relationship with DHL Express. Since the acquisition, UK Mail has rebranded as DHL Parcel UK and now operates domestic parcel services under the DHL network.
- February 2019: The group reaches an agreement with SF Express (SF Holding) for its supply chain operations in China.

== Financial data ==
The key trends of the DHL Group are (as at the financial year ending December 31):

Year	Revenue (€ bn)	Net Income (€ bn)	Assets (€ bn)	Employees (k)
2011	52.8	1.1	38.4	423
2012	55.5	1.6	34.1	428
2013	55.0	2.0	35.4	435
2014	56.6	2.0	36.9	443
2015	59.2	1.5	37.8	450
2016	57.3	2.6	38.2	459
2017	60.4	2.7	38.6	472
2018	61.5	2.0	50.4	499
2019	63.3	2.6	52.1	499
2020	66.8	2.9	55.3	502
2021	81.7	5.0	63.5	528
2022	94.4	5.3	68.2	542
2023	81.8	3.7	66.8	547
2024	84.1	3.3	69.8	551
2025	82.8	3.5	71.0	538

== Corporate divisions ==
=== Post and parcel division ===
Deutsche Post logo

The postal division delivers approximately 61 million letters every working day in Germany, and provides services across the entire mail value chain, including production facilities at central hubs, sales offices and production centers on four continents.

This division inherited most of the traditional mail services formerly offered by the state-owned monopoly, for which it uses the Deutsche Post brand. Its exclusive right to deliver letters under 50 grams in Germany expired on 1 January 2008, following the implementation of European legislation. In 2002, Deutsche Post was granted a license to deliver mail in the United Kingdom, breaking Royal Mail's long-standing monopoly.

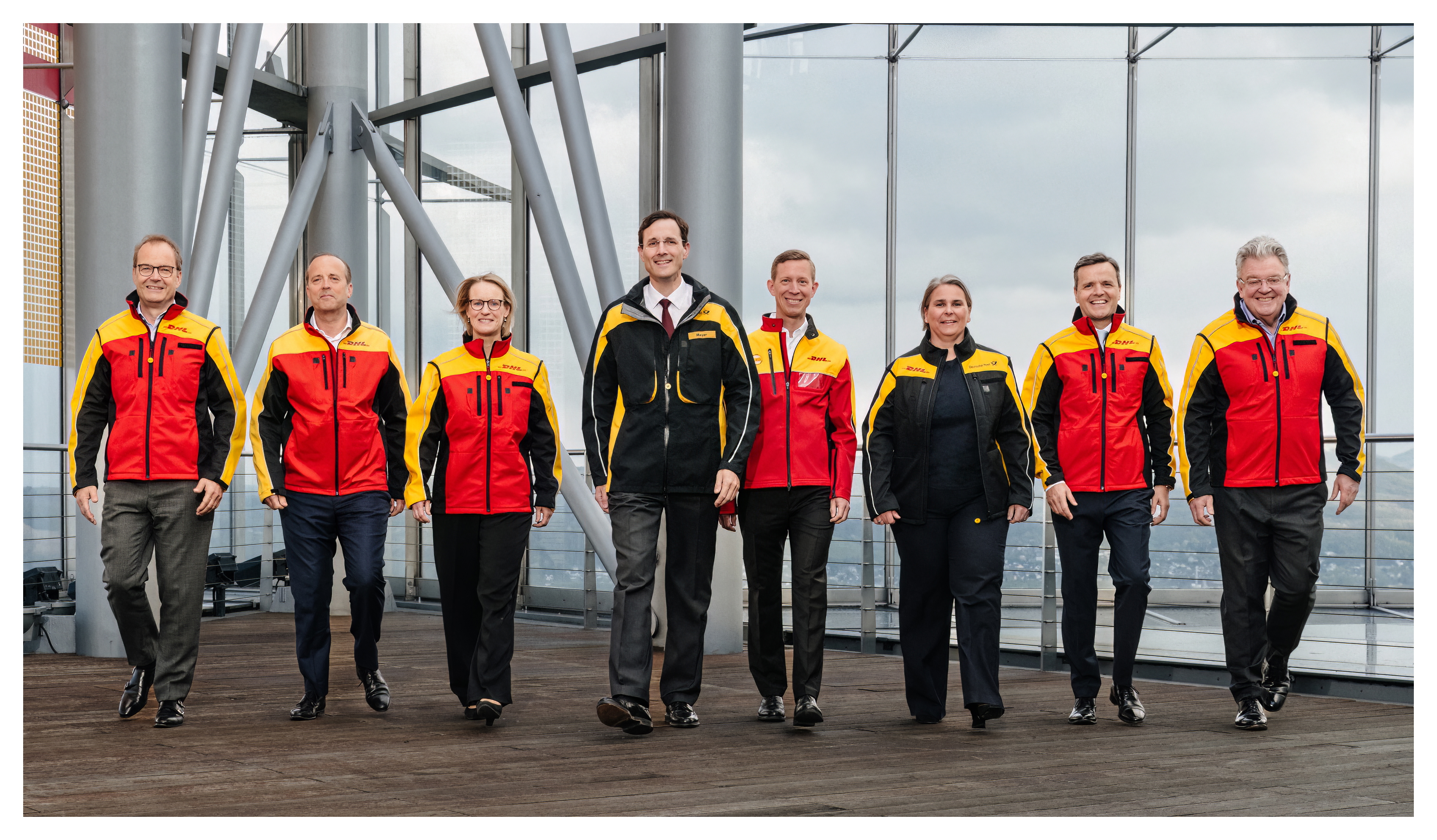
DHL Group Board members: Tim Scharwath, Oscar de Bok, Melanie Kreis, Tobias Meyer, Thomas Ogilvie, Nikola Hagleitner, Pablo Ciano, John Pearson (2025)

In 2016, in Germany alone, the Post & Parcel (P&P) division delivered over 1.2 billion parcels, an increase of 9.3% over 2015, much of it as result of shipping products purchased by customers on-line. The e-commerce aspect helped to generate a great deal of revenue. This division's revenue increased by 4.1 percent to €16.8 billion while earnings before interest and taxes (EBIT) increased by 30.8 percent to over €1.4 billion.

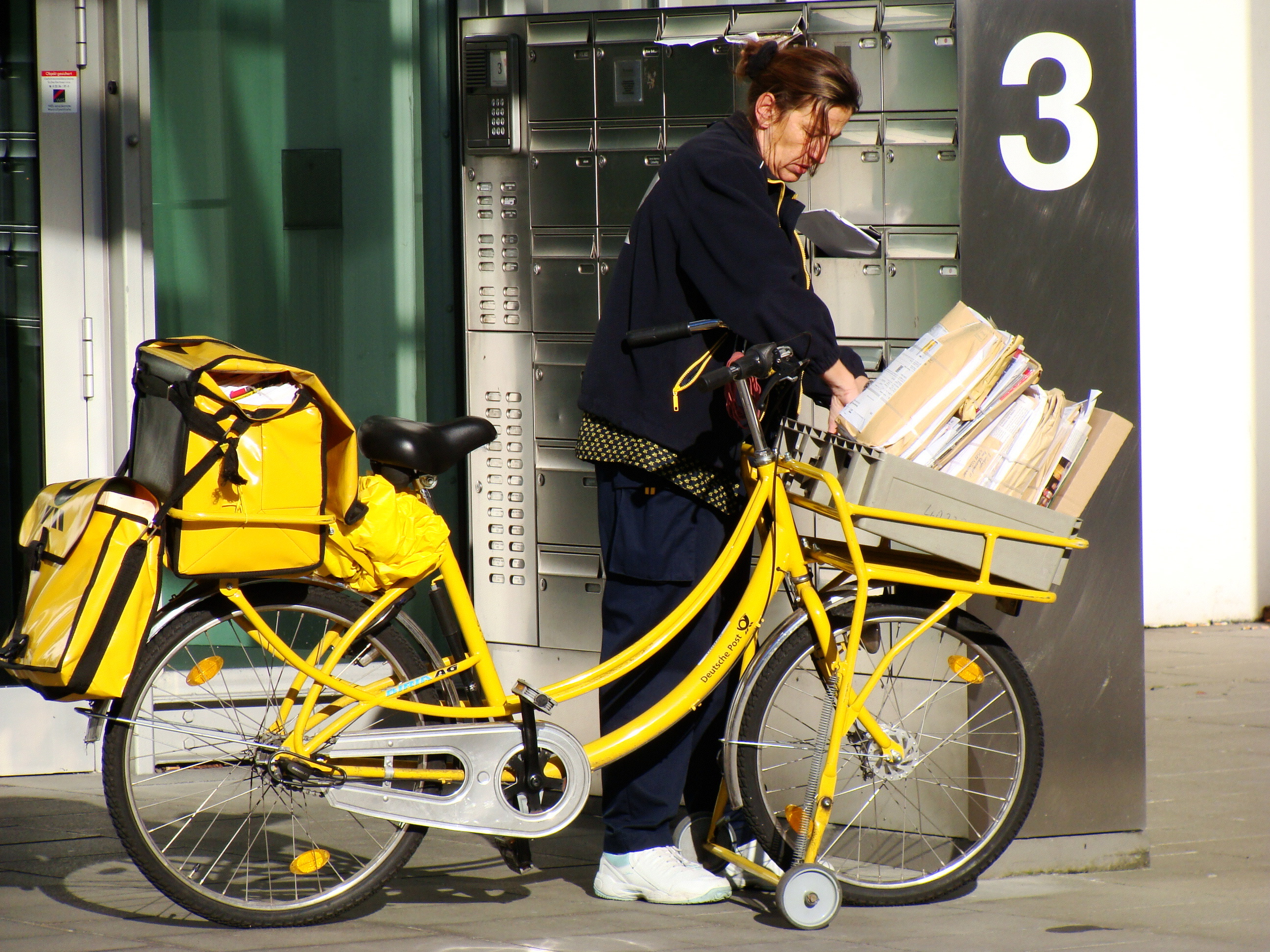
Delivery bike, Cologne

=== eCommerce division ===
Since financial year 2019, DHL Group has been pooling its international parcel delivery operations in the eCommerce division.

=== Express division ===
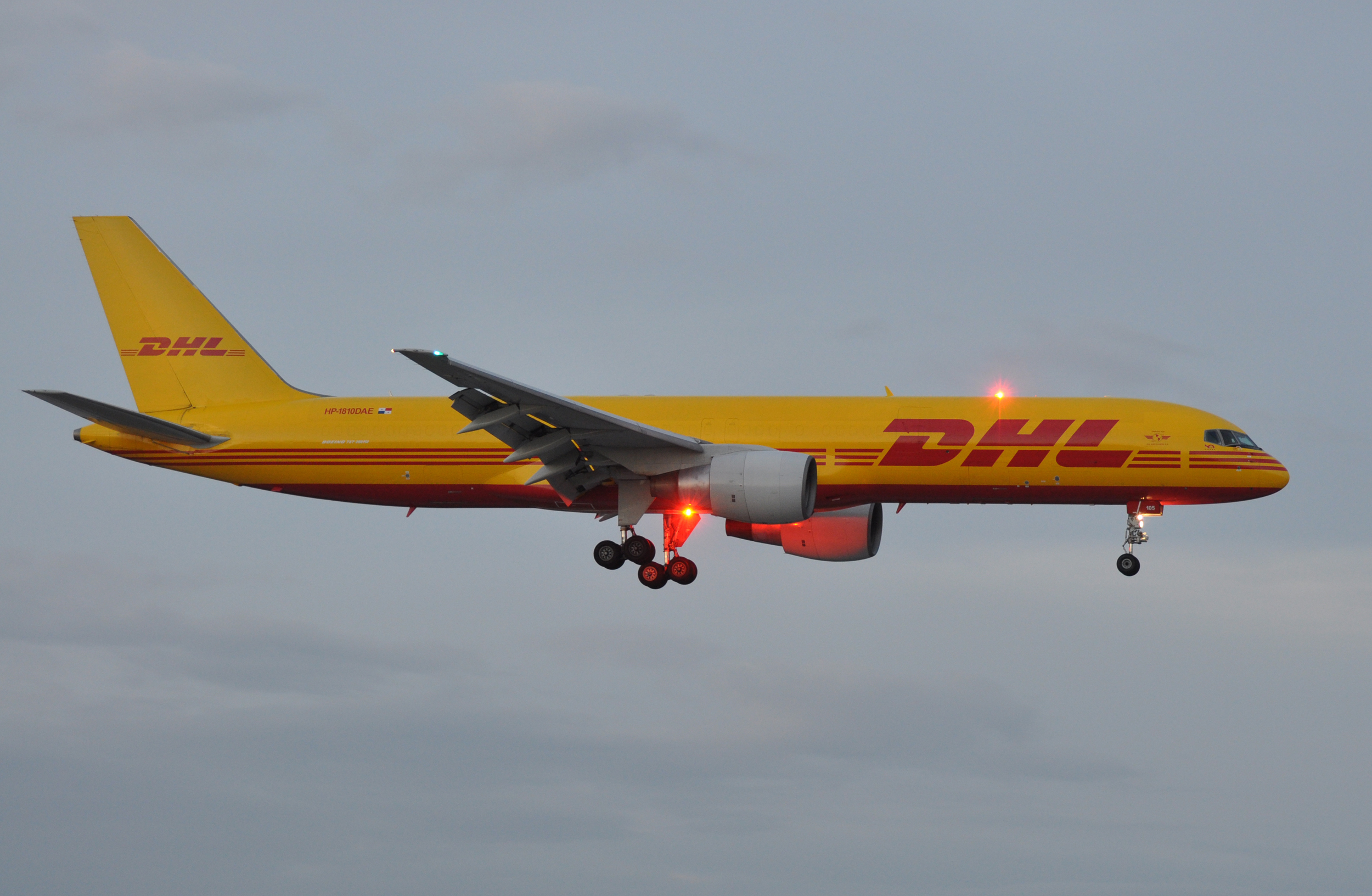
DHL Aero Expreso Boeing 757-200F

The DHL Express division offers worldwide courier, express and parcel shipment service, combining air and ground transport, under the DHL brand. It owns five airlines: European Air Transport Leipzig, DHL Air UK, DHL Aero Expreso, SNAS/DHL and Blue Dart Aviation.

In 2016, this division's revenue increased by 2.7 per cent to €14 billion. The operating profit before interest and taxes (EBIT) increased by 11.3% over 2015 to €1.5 billion.

Express is divided into business units along regions:

- Europe
- Asia Pacific
- Americas
- Europe, the Middle East and Africa

=== Global Forwarding – Freight division ===
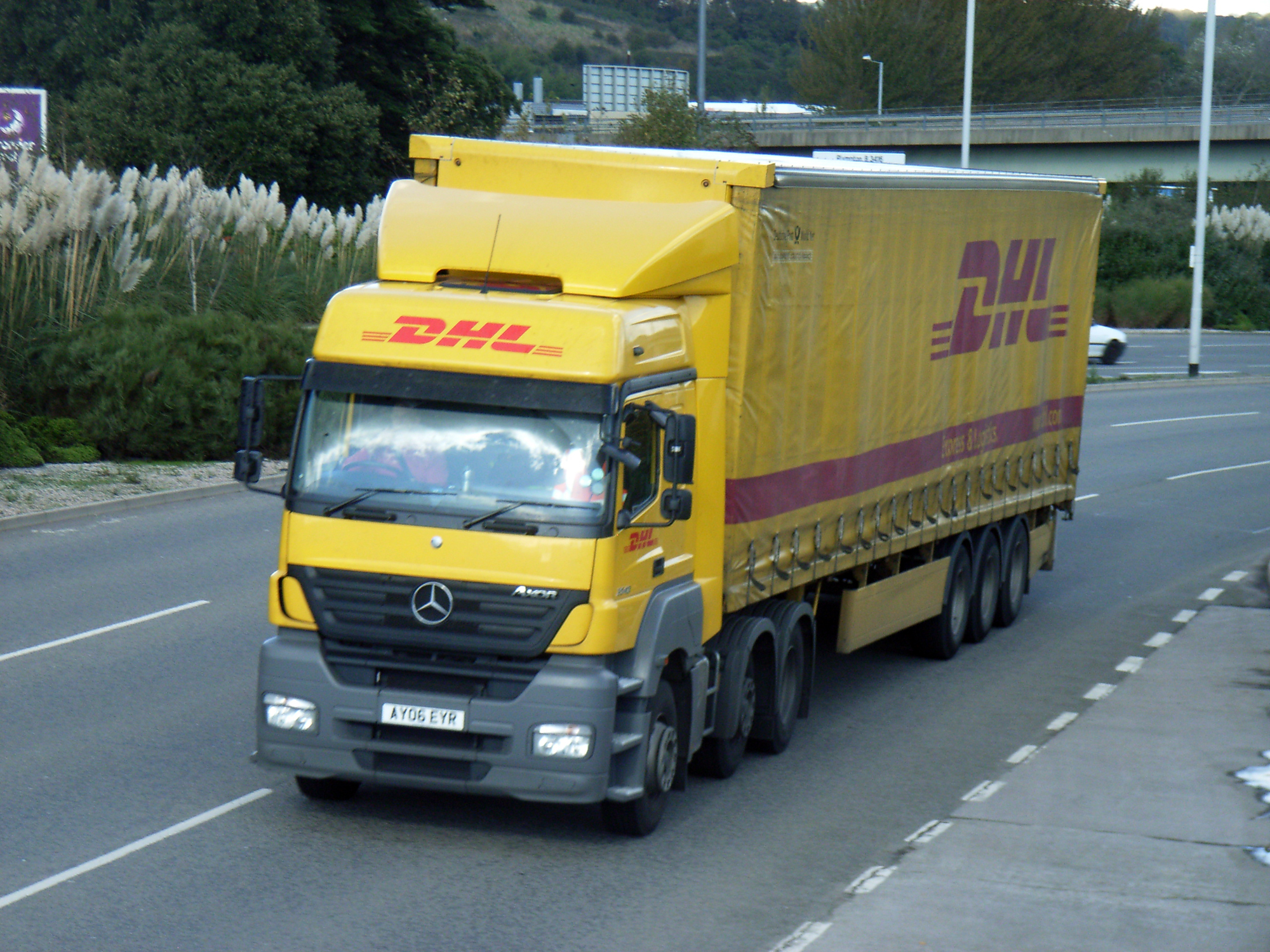
DHL semitrailer truck

The DHL Global Forwarding division carries goods by rail, road, air and sea under the DHL brand and includes the DHL Freight operation which runs a ground-based freight network covering Europe, Russia and traffic into the Middle East. In 2016, this division's revenue declined by 7.7 percent to €13.7 billion but operating profit before interest and taxes (EBIT) improved from -€181 million in 2015 to +€287 million.

=== Supply Chain division ===
The DHL Supply Chain division provides contract logistics and corporate information. In 2016, this division's revenue decreased by 11.6% to €14.0 billion versus 2015, but operating profit improved by 27.4% to €572 million.

The division consists of two main business units:

- DHL Supply Chain provides warehousing and warehouse transport for customers from a wide variety of sectors.
- Corporate Information Solutions handles documents (collection, digitalisation, printing, storage, archival) of all types.

In July, 2020, Deutsche Post DHL Group significantly increased earnings in Q2 2020 despite COVID-19. Operating profit (EBIT) improved by around 16% to around EUR 890 million.

== IT services ==
DHL has central data centres in the Czech Republic, Malaysia and the United States. It backs up critical data across these locations to reduce the risk of disruption.

The Prague IT centre opened in September 2004 to take over European computing operations from centres in the United Kingdom and Switzerland. More than 1,600 IT professionals work in Prague, managing networks, databases and applications used throughout the group.

== Electric van manufacturing ==
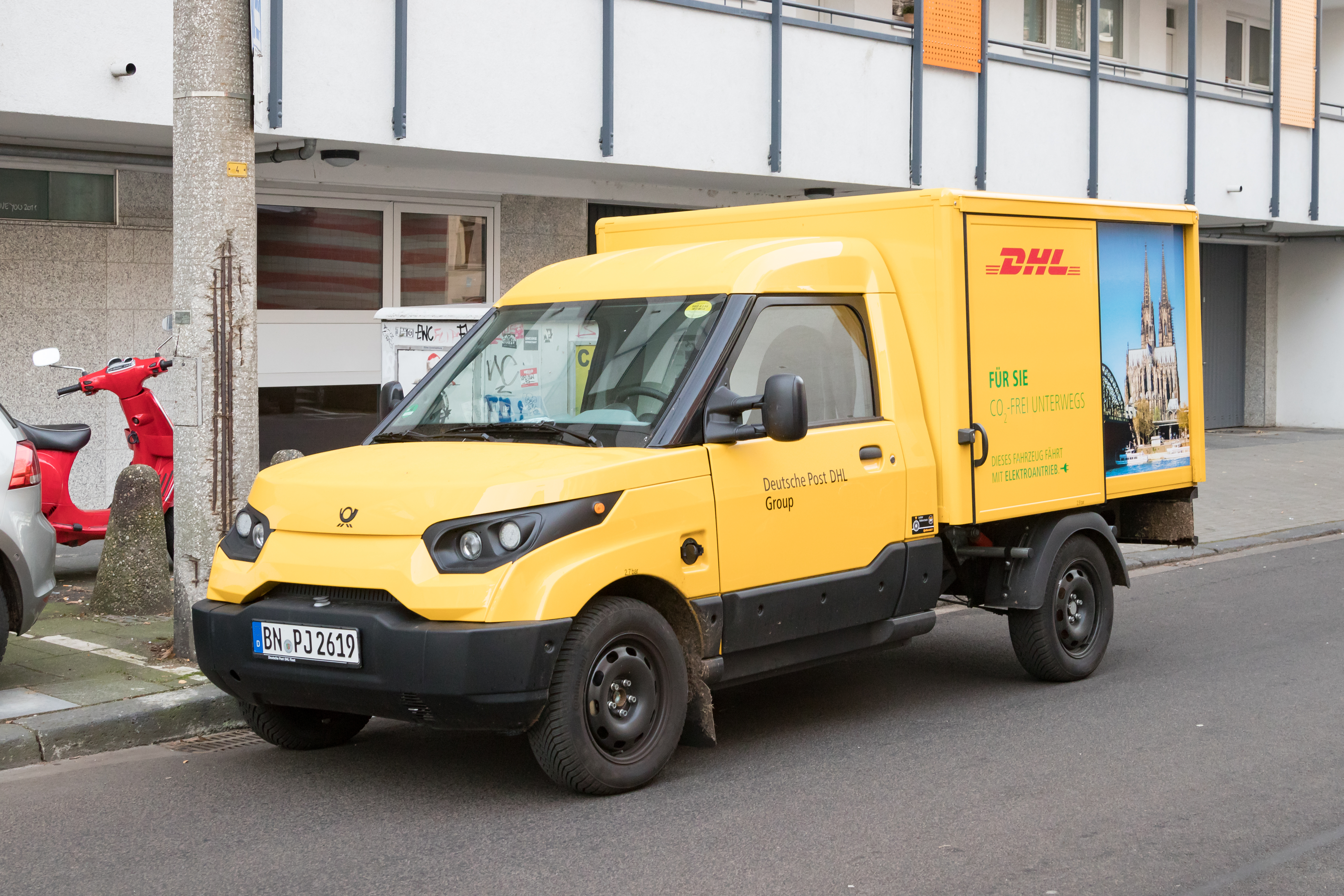
Electric StreetScooter Work as DHL Express van (2016)

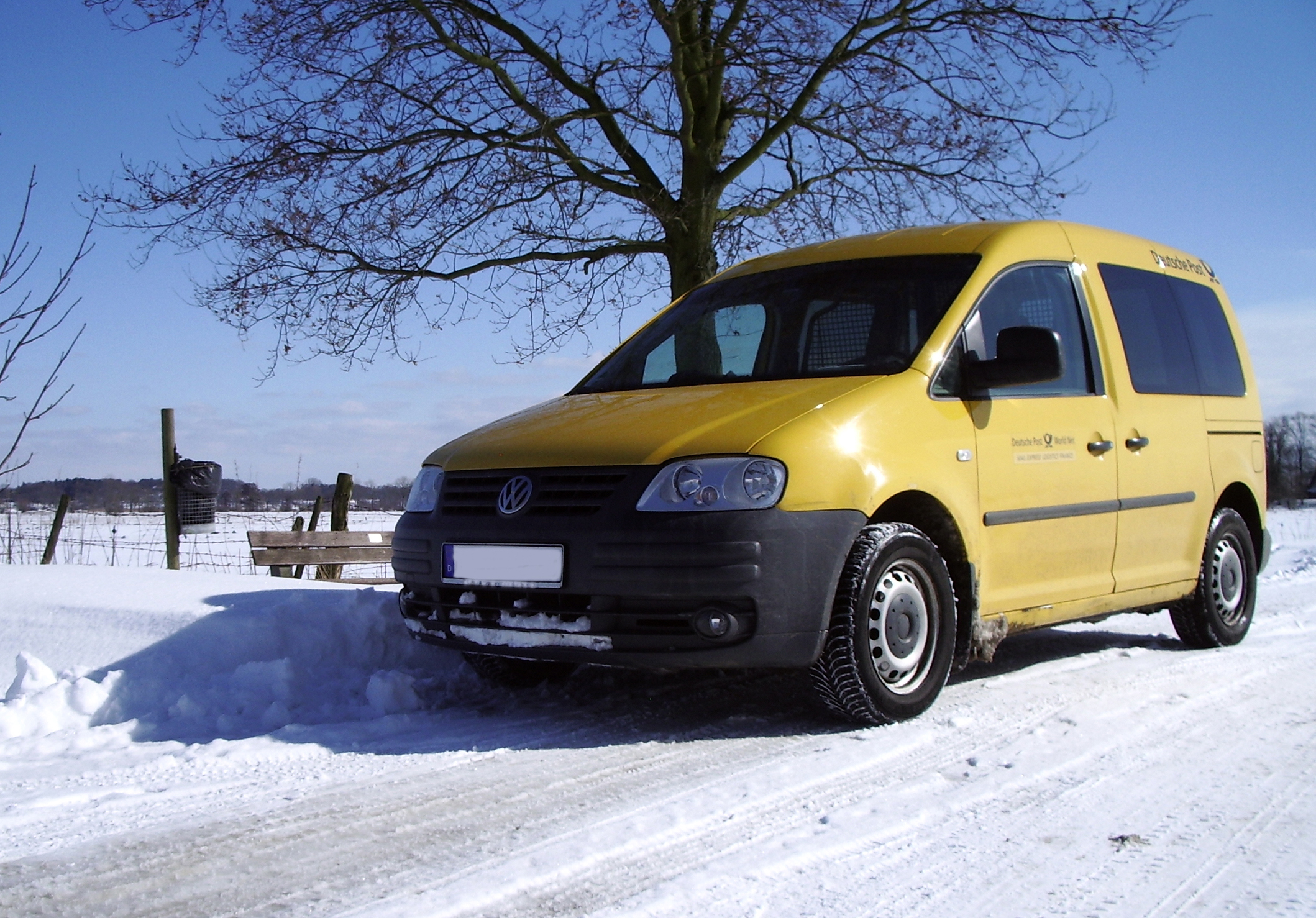
The VW Caddy diesel-powered vans will be replaced by StreetScooter Work models, initially in Germany.

In December 2014, Deutsche Post DHL Group purchased StreetScooter GmbH, a small manufacturer of electric vehicles in Aachen, Germany. By April 2016, the company announced that it would produce 2,000 of the StreetScooter Work model in Aachen by year end.

The Work vehicle is equipped with lithium-ion battery packs and is powered by 30 kW asynchronous electric motors. The peak/continuous output is stated as 48 kW/38 kW. The range (before the need to recharge) is said to be 50 to 80 km, depending on the weight of the load and traffic conditions. The load capacity is 710 kg.

Deutsche Post's 2016 annual report indicates that it plans to replace its fleet of delivery vehicles in Germany with the electric StreetScooter products "in the medium term". Electric vans and trucks with a much greater range will be required to achieve the very long-term goal of replacing the group's entire fleet of approximately 70,000 vehicles with electric StreetScooter vehicles.

A mass production plan was announced in April 2016. StreetScooter GmbH would be scaling up to manufacture approximately 10,000 vehicles annually, starting in 2017. If that goal is achieved, it will become Europe's largest electric light utility vehicle manufacturer, surpassing Renault, which makes vans such as the Kangoo Z.E.

StreetScooter showed a larger prototype, the Work L, in September 2016 that will provide double the capacity in cargo size; its load capacity will be 1,000 kg. The range (before recharging is necessary) is estimated at "up to 100 km". The company also announced that it was developing a Work Orange model with an "electro-hydraulic three-way dumper" for use by businesses that deal in trash or construction material handling.

In 2021, plans for the sale of Streetscooter to Luxembourg-based Odin Automotive, now B-ON, were reported.

== Brands ==
- Deutsche Post – offers domestic mail services under its traditional name; the division is called Post - eCommerce - Parcel (PeP).
- DHL – brand used as an umbrella brand for worldwide logistics services.
- Power Packaging – supplier of food and beverage contract manufacturing and packaging services to North American companies.
- StreetScooter – electric vehicle manufacturer owned by the group since December 2014.

== See also ==
- Kaiserliche Reichspost
