= Melanie Kreis =

German businesswoman (born 1971)

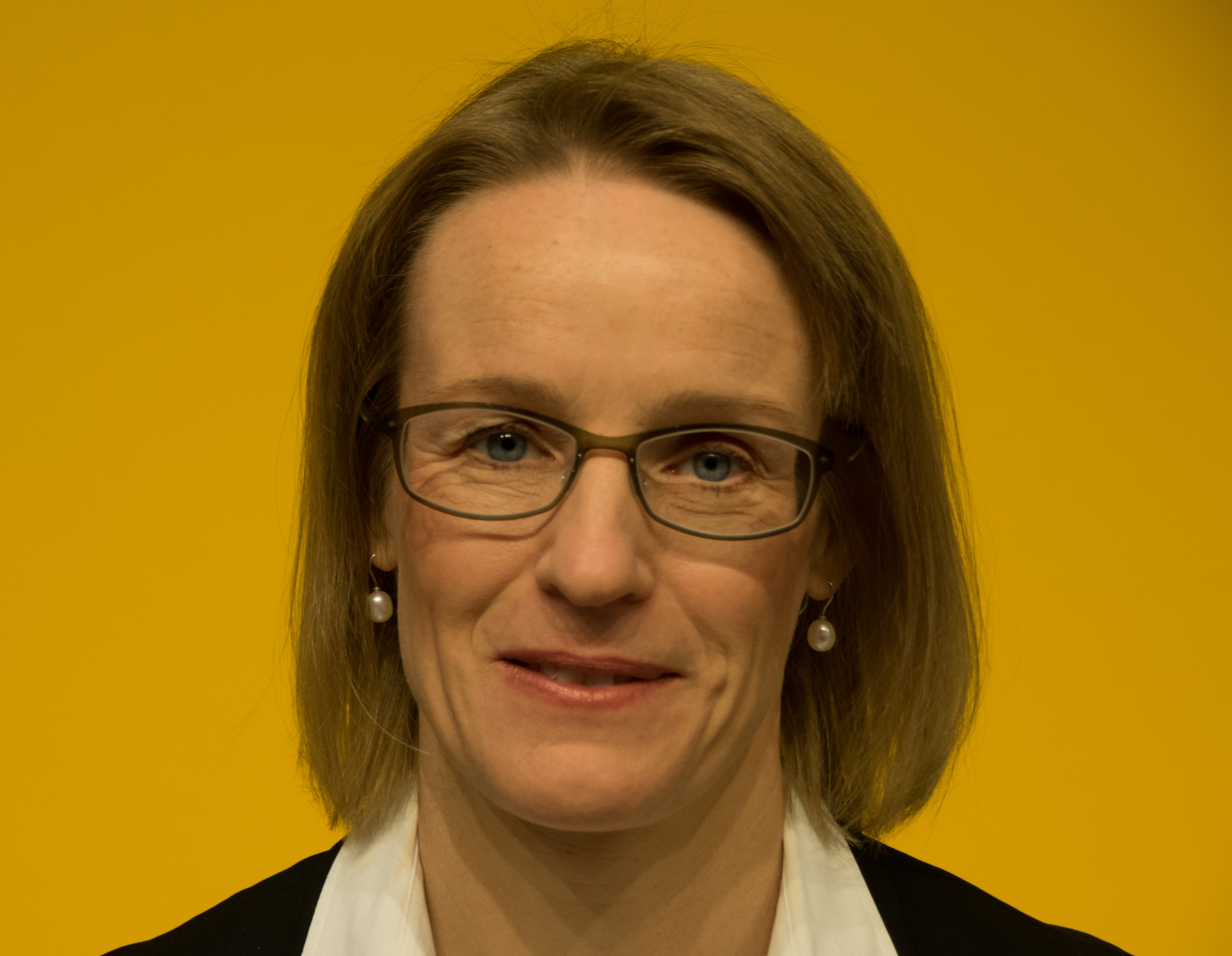
- Melanie Kreis in 2017
- Born: 1971 (age 54–55); Bonn, West Germany
- Education: State University of New York at Stony Brook; University of Bonn; INSEAD
- Occupation: Businesswoman
- Title: CFO, Deutsche Post
- Spouse: Married
- Children: 2

Melanie Kreis (born 1971) is a German businesswoman, member of the board of managing directors and the chief financial officer (CFO) of Deutsche Post, the world's largest logistics company, since October 2016.

== Education ==
Kreis was born in Bonn in 1971 to parents who were civil servants. She attended the State University of New York at Stony Brook, US, and graduated in 1994 with a master's in physics and obtained another degree in physics in 1997 from the University of Bonn. In 2000 she graduated with a Master of Business Administration at INSEAD, France.

== Career ==
From 1997 to 2000, Kreis worked at the management consulting firm McKinsey & Company in Cologne. Later, she then moved to Apax Partners, a private equity firm. At Deutsche Post, Kreis began her career in the corporate development department in Bonn in 2004. Later she worked in England, advancing the integration of Exel. In 2006 Kreis was appointed executive vice president corporate office, corporate organization. Since 2009 she then served as leader of group controlling. In April 2013 she was appointed as chief financial officer (CFO) of DHL Express. She has been a member of the executive board of Deutsche Post since 2014 as chief human resources officer. Since October 2016, Kreis is CFO of Deutsche Post and the first woman to hold this position at Deutsche Post.

== Awards ==
Kreis was named as one of the "75 most influential women in German Business" and as "woman of the year" by Manager Magazin and Boston Consulting Group (BCG) in 2016. In November 2017, she was assessed by Forbes as being the 67th most powerful woman in the world. She was ranked 52nd on Fortune's list of Most Powerful Women in 2023.

== Family ==
Kreis is married and has two daughters.
