= PostNL =

Mail, parcel and e-commerce corporation with operations in the Netherlands

PostNL N.V.
- Type: Public
- Traded as: Euronext Amsterdam: PNL
- Industry: Courier
- Predecessor: KPN's postal division
- Founded: June 1998
- Headquarters: The Hague, Netherlands
- Area served: Benelux
- Key people: Pim Berendsen (CEO)
- Services: Package delivery; Postal services
- Revenue: €3.252 billion (2024)
- Operating income: €37 million (2024)
- Net income: €18 million (2024)
- Number of employees: 32,405 (2024)
- Subsidiaries: Prime Vision (60%); Spring GDS; Whistl (17.5%)
- Website: postnl.nl

PostNL N.V., commonly known as PostNL (Dutch pronunciation: [ˈpɔst ɛnˌɛl]) (formerly TNT N.V.) is a Dutch mail, parcel and e-commerce company with operations mainly in the Benelux area. It provides universal delivery in the Netherlands, and is publicly listed at Euronext Amsterdam. The company was known as TNT NV until TNT Express was separated from it in May 2011, and the remainder of the company was renamed PostNL.

== History ==
Former PostNL logo

Former TNT logo

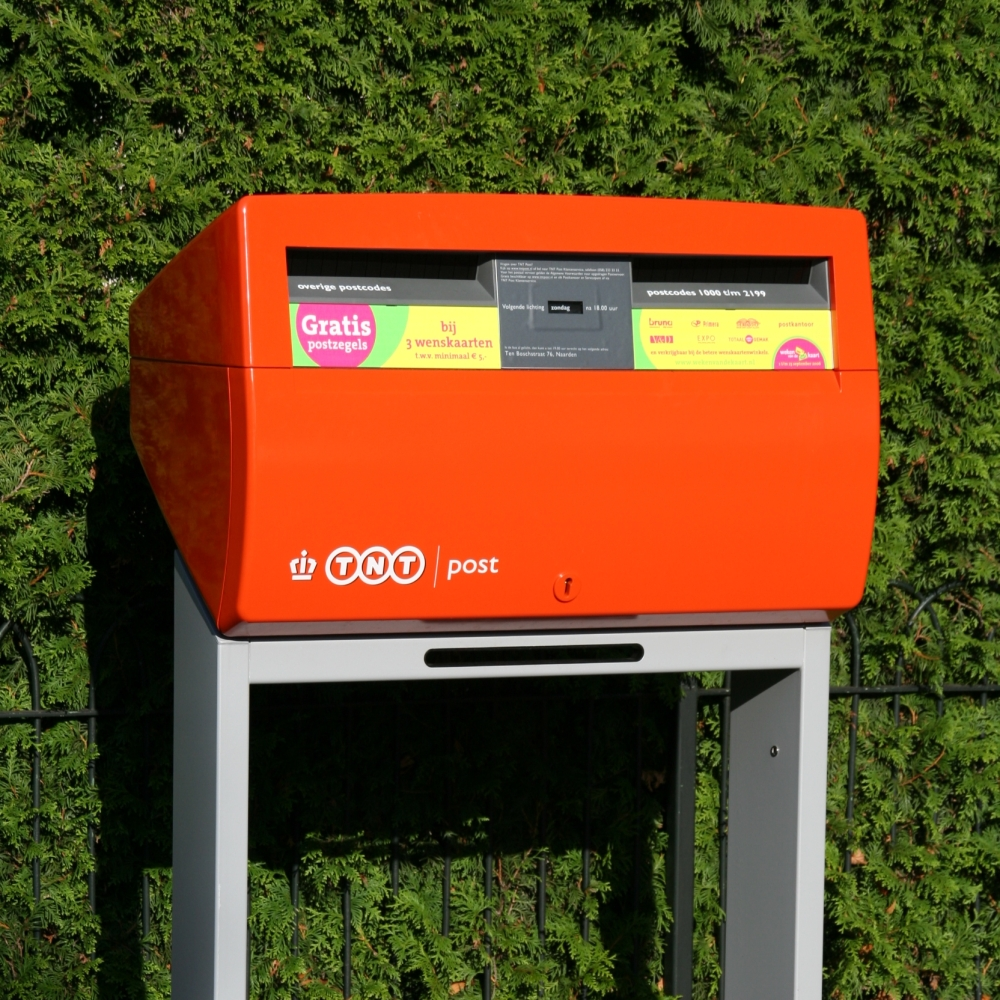
TNT mail box

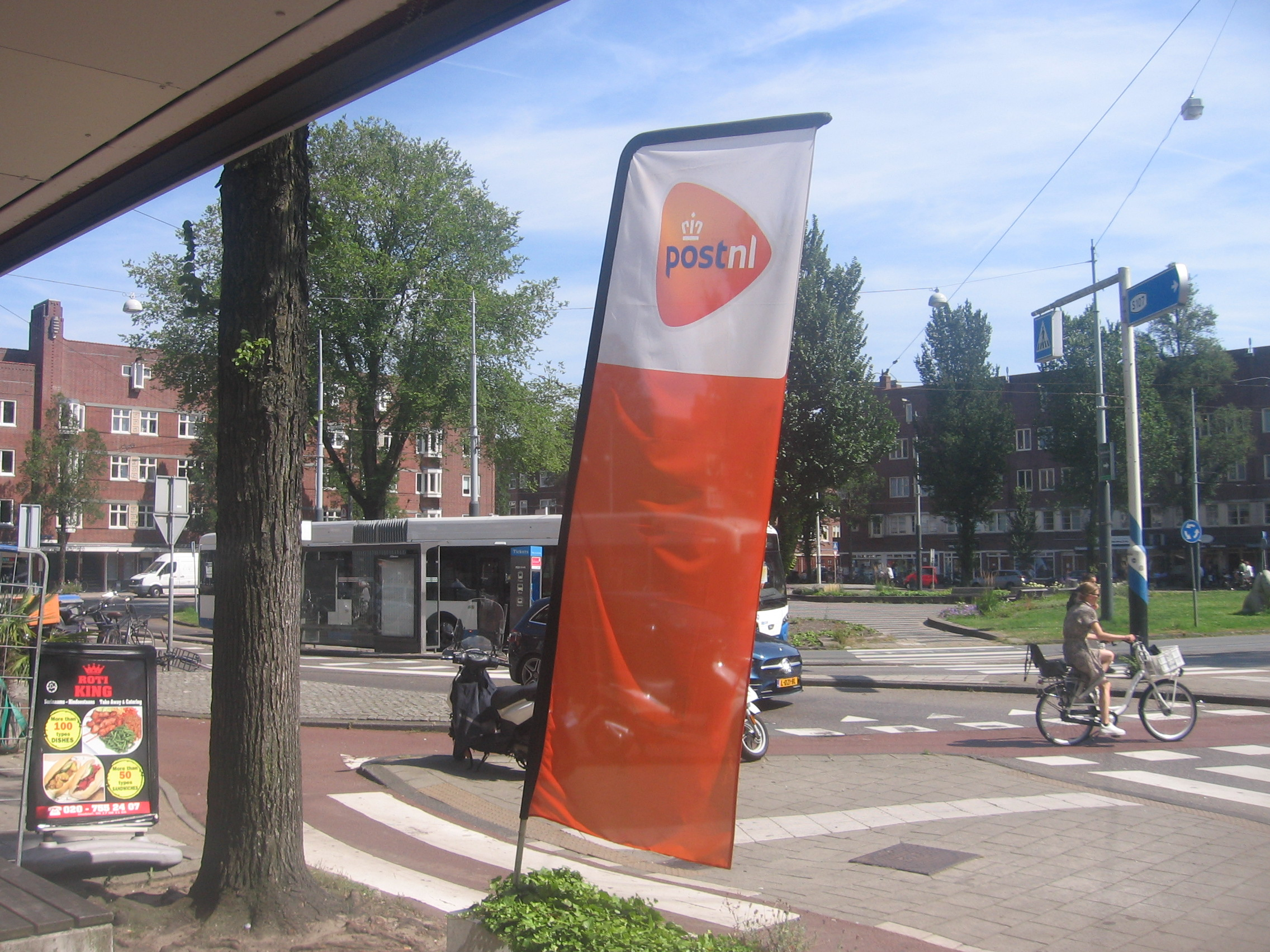
A PostNL office near Hoofddorpplein in Amsterdam

In January 1997, KPN, the government-owned postal monopoly in the Netherlands, purchased Australian based TNT Limited after completing a friendly takeover. TNT's non-core activities outside of mail, express and logistics were sold.

These included Ansett Worldwide Aviation Service to Morgan Stanley Dean Witter, the Komatsu Forklift business, the Port of Geelong and some other Australian interests to Toll Holdings, and the Sydney Monorail and Sydney light rail operation to CGEA Transport Sydney.

On 25 June 1998, KPN merged its PTT Post division to form the TNT Post Group (TPG) that was listed on the Amsterdam, Frankfurt, London and New York stock exchanges.

In April 1998, TPG opened its European Express Centre at Liège Airport Belgium. In October 1998, an international road hub opened in Duiven, Netherlands. In December 1998, TPG acquired French company Jet Services. In April 2005, TNT Post Group was rebranded as TNT. In November 2006, TNT sold its logistics division to Apollo Global Management, it was later rebranded CEVA Logistics.

In March 2007, TNT acquired Hoau, China's private freight and parcels delivery firm. On 18 June 2007, TNT was delisted from the New York Stock Exchange. In August 2010, TNT announced its intention to float the express business as a separate company. This took effect on 31 May 2011, with TNT Express floated on the Amsterdam Stock Exchange, and TNT NV renamed PostNL.

PostNL retained a 29.9% stake in TNT Express on completion of the breakup. Peter Bakker, chief executive officer of TNT since 2001, stepped down at the end of May 2011 with Harry Koorstra becoming CEO of PostNL. In April 2012, Harry Koorstra resigned after conflicts with the supervisory board. Herna Verhagen became the new CEO.

In June 2013, PostNL announced that to reduce costs in the face of declining volume, it would be eliminating Monday deliveries (accounting for only 2.6% of volume), cut the number of post boxes in half, and reduce the number of post offices from around 2,500 to about 1,000. From 2012 to 2013, the organization reduced the number of mail processing locations from 260 to 145.

== Operations ==
=== Netherlands ===
PostNL, formerly known as Koninklijke TNT Post, has been assigned by the Dutch government to carry out the UPD (Universele Postdienst, Dutch for Universal Postal Service). Carrying out the UPD requires, amongst other things, PostNL to deliver mail throughout the Netherlands five days a week (Tuesday through Saturday) and to maintain enough mailboxes in the country.

Autoriteit Consument & Markt is charged with monitoring and enforcing the execution by PostNL.

=== Rest of Europe ===
PostNL operates in Belgium, Luxembourg, Germany, Italy and the United Kingdom. The company continued to use the TNT Post name in these countries shortly after the demerger, in agreement with TNT Express that it would rebrand by the end of 2014. In the end of 2013, its Belgian operations were also rebranded as PostNL.

TNT Post Germany was rebranded as Postcon in March 2014, and in May TNT Post Italy was rebranded Nexive, using the same logo style as its parent PostNL.

TNT Post UK was rebranded as Whistl in September 2014, and in October 2015 PostNL sold a majority stake in the company to its management in a management buyout. In August 2019, PostNL announced it had agreed to sell its Postcon operations in Germany to Quantum Capital Partners, with the sale expected to take effect from the end of 2019. In February 2020 PostNL signed an agreement with Mutares for the sale of 80% of the shares of the Italian subsidiary of PostNL, Nexive. Mutares would obtain a majority interest of 80% and PostNL a minority interest of 20% of the entity that acquired Nexive. The transaction was subject to a number of conditions and was expected to close in Q2, 2020.

== See also ==
- Postage stamps and postal history of the Netherlands
