= Evri =

British delivery company

Evri Limited
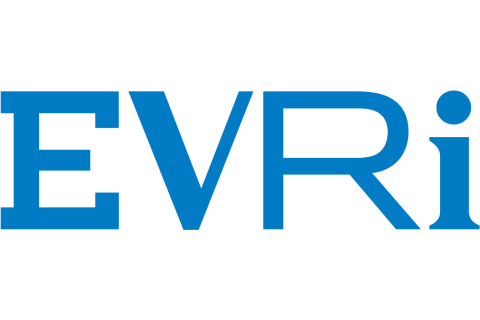
- Type: Private
- Industry: Courier
- Founded: March 2022; 4 years ago
- Headquarters: Leeds, United Kingdom
- Area served: United Kingdom
- Key people: Martijn de Lange (CEO)
- Products: Parcel delivery
- Owner: DHL (2025–present)
- Website: evri.com

Evri Limited is a British delivery company headquartered in Leeds. It was created from the rebrand of Hermes Europe UK operations in March 2022.

== Background ==
Evri was formerly known as Hermes UK. The name was an offshoot of a rebranding strategy in March 2022 to address negative press concerning the mishandling of parcels. It was claimed that the company accepted huge volume of orders it was unable to effectively service. A Times report also documented cases of couriers mishandling parcels, which the company denied. Months after the controversy, the company launched the rebrand, announcing the recruitment of 200 experts to be based in local depots and the enrolment of its 20,000 workers in a £7 million pension scheme. The initiative is credited for turning things around so that the company's total revenue grew by 15% in 2024.

In July 2024, private equity firm Apollo Global Management agreed to acquire Evri from owners Advent International, which owned a 75% stake, and Otto Group, parent company of Hermes Europe, which owned the remaining 25%. This resulted in the company being completely separate from Hermes.

In May 2025, DHL agreed to merge its UK e-commerce delivery operations with Evri, creating one of the largest combined courier firm in the UK. In October 2025, the merger was completed.

Evri announced that it would auto-enrol all of its 20,000 'self-employed plus (SE+)' workers into a pension by the end of 2022. Its CEO, Martijn de Lange, stated: "When we first announced our SE+ model in 2019 we committed to continuing to develop our support for our self-employed couriers and we are proud to have been true to that and be leading the industry once again. Our couriers receive guaranteed pay rates, paid holiday and now a pension but have also been able to retain the flexibility that so many treasure, fitting in their deliveries alongside their other, often family, commitments."

On 23 September, following its acquisition by Apollo, S&P Global announced that UK-based parcel delivery company Edge Finco PLC (Evri, Company Number 15868287) has been assigned a 'B+' Rating; Outlook Stable.

When revealing its intention to merge with DHL's UK parcel delivery business to create a courier firm in May 2025, Evri said the deal would allow for its international expansion and access to its new partner's global network. With the merger finalized, while Evri will be able to offer letter service for the first time, DHL's e-commerce division will be known as Evri Premium – a network of DHL eCommerce.

On 11 June 2025, the UK's Competition and Markets Authority (CMA) reported that it would collect information for two weeks to begin the first phase of investigations to determine whether the proposed merger would result in a substantial reduction in competition. According to a decision by the Central Arbitration Committee in March 2024, DHL does not have collective bargaining recognition with the British union GMB, nor does Evri.

In October 2025, it was announced that the merger had been completed.

== Criticism ==
Regulatory assessments and consumer polls have repeatedly placed Evri at the lower end of satisfaction rankings among UK couriers, with Ofcom reporting that it was the worst-performing major delivery firm for customer satisfaction.

In addition to service quality concerns, Evri has faced scrutiny over workplace practices. For instance, its pay-per-parcel courier model has raised questions as to whether the company complies with the UK minimum wage law.
