= UK Mail =

Postal service company

DHL Parcel UK Limited
- Type: Postal services
- Headquarters: Slough, England, UK
- Area served: United Kingdom
- Products: Postal services
- Parent: Deutsche Post DHL Group
- Website: www.ukmail.com

UK Mail, a trading name of DHL Parcel UK Limited (formerly Business Post), is a postal service company operating in the United Kingdom, which has competed with Royal Mail in collection and distribution of mail, since the deregulation of the postal service in January 2006. Its distribution network delivers mail to local Royal Mail sorting offices for last mile delivery through downstream access.

UK Mail competes primarily with Royal Mail and Whistl. Since December 2016, the company has been owned by Deutsche Post DHL Group. The company name was changed from UK Mail Limited to DHL Parcel UK Limited in July 2018, and its parcel service rebranded, although the name UK Mail will continue to be used for mail and packet services.

== History ==
UK Mail originated as a taxi firm in Harrow in 1971. In just a few years, the company evolved into a national business offering same day courier and overnight parcel delivery. By 1986, the then much larger company became Business Post, and was then listed on the London Stock Exchange in 1993. UK Mail was granted one seven year licence by Postcomm in June 2003 to provide postal services for business customers.

It began trading in May 2004, with Powergen as its first customer, and delivered its one billionth item of mail in October 2006. In July 2009, its parent company, Business Post Group, became UK Mail Group to "reflect the growing importance of the mail arm". In November 2015, problems caused by a new automated sorting hub had resulted in a loss in profit, and a share price drop.

In September 2016, UK Mail announced that it would be acquired by Deutsche Post. By this time, the news media reported that the company had established "one of the largest integrated parcels and mail operations in the United Kingdom". The sale was concluded in December 2016, for US$315.5 million (£243 million).

The former company became a division of the Deutsche Post European parcel network although its web site acknowledges only the relationship with DHL Express. In March 2017, UK Mail was criticised for charging a sick self employed courier £216 a day as the cost of hiring a replacement. In reply, the company stated that "UK Mail only ever passes on the actual costs incurred, which is in line with the contract with the driver and with company policy".
