= Hermes Europe =

European logistics company

Hermes Europe GmbH
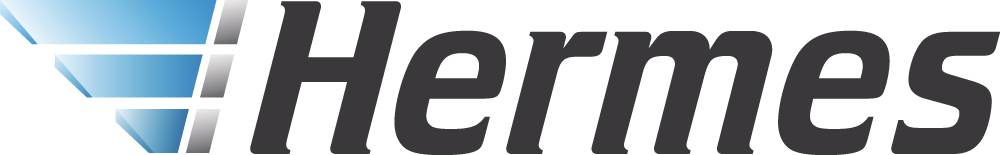
- Type: Private
- Industry: Courier
- Founded: 1972; 54 years ago in West Germany
- Headquarters: Hamburg, Germany
- Area served: United Kingdom, Italy, Austria, Germany, China, Russia
- Key people: Carole Walker (CEO)
- Products: Parcel delivery
- Parent: Otto GmbH
- Website: hermesworld.com

Hermes Europe GmbH is a German delivery company headquartered in Hamburg, owned by the retail company Otto GmbH.

== History ==
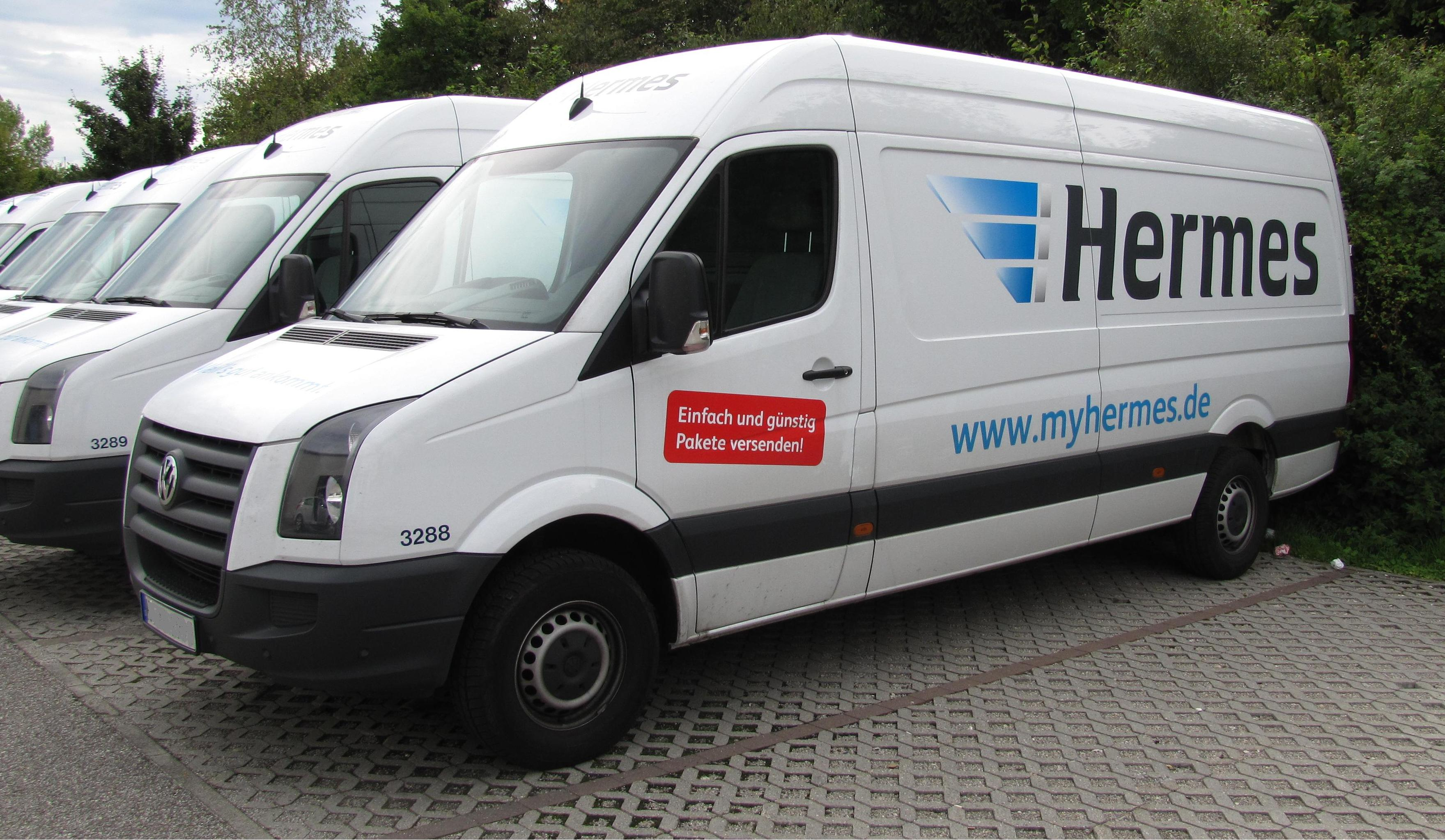
Volkswagen Crafter delivery van for Hermes in Germany

The company was founded in 1972 in Germany, opening 20 depots in its first year. In 1989, after the fall of the Berlin Wall, it began offering deliveries to East Germany.

It expanded to France in 1997, the United Kingdom in 2000, Austria in 2007, Italy in 2009 and Russia in 2010.

In November 2020, Advent International announced it would partner with the current management team to acquire a 75% stake in Hermes UK. Otto Group would continue to own 25% of the company. Advent would also acquire a 25% stake in Hermes Germany. The partnership would not affect Hermes' activities in Russia and Austria, the holding company Hermes Europe or the companies not involved in parcel delivery.

In March 2022, following allegations of poor customer service and parcel mishandling, Hermes UK announced it would rebrand as Evri.

== Criticism ==
The company was named as the second worst parcel delivery service in the United Kingdom (after Yodel) by users of MoneySavingExpert.com in January 2014, with 30% of customers rating their experience as "bad".

Mat Heywood (Guardian reporter) produced a video report on 18 July 2016 that described courier work, and concluded "it's hard work, definitely skilled work". The route took him well over twice the time the company suggested it takes.

In September 2016 the government asked HM Revenue and Customs to consider launching an investigation into Hermes, after workers alleged they received pay equivalent to lower than the current minimum wage in the United Kingdom. During this investigation a whistleblower claimed that Hermes coerced managers into misleading an HMRC investigation.

In June 2017 the GMB union claimed "Hermes dodges its responsibility to check proper insurance cover is in place by asking them (couriers) to acknowledge they "understand that motor insurance is required to deliver and collect parcels and/or catalogues on behalf of Hermes." In response Hermes "categorically refutes" allegations made by the GMB that it is putting their drivers and the public at serious avoidable risk by cutting corners in the interests of profit.

In September 2017 Frank Field, Baron Field of Birkenhead, Labour MP and chair of the Commons work and pensions select committee, said he had written to Mike Ashley, the billionaire Sports Direct founder, to demand answers following concerns raised by a whistleblower at Hermes regarding claims the company was under-paying couriers by mislabelling items as lightweight packets to avoid paying the fair delivery cost. Hermes said: "We categorically deny these allegations and are happy to answer any questions raised. We have stringent processes in place to check that parcels are not mislabelled and placed in the wrong weight category. On the rare occasion of an individual label being incorrect, couriers can immediately call our dedicated courier support team, to notify us and change their payment with no questions asked This applies to all our clients and ensures that both Hermes and our couriers receive the correct payment. We have no issues with Sports Direct who remain a valued customer."

In June 2018 an employment tribunal in Leeds found that a group of 65 couriers, supported by the GMB union through lawyers Leigh Day, were workers entitled to employment rights, including minimum wage and holiday pay, rather than self-employed as Hermes asserted. The GMB union stated the ruling was likely to affect 14,500 Hermes couriers. Hermes considered an appeal, but this did not progress.

During the coronavirus pandemic, Hermes said it would pay its drivers in the United Kingdom who needed to self-isolate only £20 daily, and payment would be made only to those who normally earned less than £90 daily. As a result, almost half its workers would receive nothing while payments to the rest would be capped at £280 per fortnight.

In an April 2020 episode of Channel 4's consumer show Joe Lycett's Got Your Back, it was shown that Hermes was sending parcels they claimed were undeliverable to an auction house. Host Joe Lycett contested the undeliverability of the items, finding many goods auctioned off had legible names, addresses and tracking numbers.

Andy McDonald MP raised concerns to Darren Jones MP, Business, Energy and Industrial Strategy Committee Chair, via a letter dated 28 May 2021, stating "It is an outrage that working people are receiving no recompense for hours of their labour, or seeing enforced reductions to their pay with the threat of redundancy. Furthermore, the number of hours that Hermes drivers are made to work to make ends meet is not only a moral outrage but a very dangerous safety concern for the wider public as well as the drivers themselves." The letter from Mr McDonald contained several courier testimonies.

In June 2021 Andy McDonald MP raised allegations of exploitative working practices with regard to 'free sorting'. The Guardian had already reported that some couriers felt they had to work for free, sorting parcels so they could start their rounds on time. One manager told Mr McDonald that the company had refused to hire enough sorters at some of its Delivery Units, meaning that couriers had to sort out packages.

Mick Rix of the GMB union stated "We're trying to get to the bottom of why this is happening and why there seems to be this expectancy. Because Hermes is a multimillion-pound operation at the end of the day and it can afford to put these things in place."

A letter from Hermes dated 1 June 2021 to Darren Jones MP, Business, Energy and Industrial Strategy Committee Chair, stated that "From the start of 2017 a courier's average rate per hour (based on a rolling 12-month period), using the methodology agreed with the GMB Union, has increased by 14.41% and is currently £15.61 per hour".
