= Deutsche Post =

German mail and parcel delivery service

Post & Parcel Germany division
- Logo used since 2019. Before 2019, the "Deutsche Post" wordmark used the Frutiger typeface.
- Type: Division
- Industry: Postal services; Courier
- Predecessor: Deutsche Bundespost
- Founded: 1995; 31 years ago
- Headquarters: Bonn, Germany
- Number of locations: 13,000 post offices (2024)
- Brands: Deutsche Post, DHL
- Services: Letter post, parcel service, EMS
- Number of employees: c.187,000 (2024)
- Parent: DHL Group
- Website: deutschepost.de

Deutsche Post (German pronunciation: [ˈdɔʏtʃə ˈpɔst], lit. 'German Post') is a DHL Group brand, (listed as "Deutsche Post AG"), used for its domestic mail services in Germany. The services offered under the brand are those of a traditional mail service, making the brand the successor of the former state-owned mail monopoly, Deutsche Bundespost. Deutsche Post's monopoly on these services expired in 2008.

== Products ==
As of 2024, the following services are offered under the brand by DHL Group's Post & Parcel Germany (Post & Paket Deutschland) division:

- Mail Communication handles the domestic mail service (except parcels).
- Press Services handles domestic distribution of print products (newspapers and magazines).
- Retail Outlets operates domestic retail outlets (post offices), which offer letter mail, parcel and Postbank services.
- Dialogue Marketing provides services for direct marketing such as market research and address verification.

Other services by the division, such as DHL Parcel (DHL Paket), use the DHL brand.

== See also ==
- Postal codes in Germany
- List of national postal services
