= DHL Supply Chain =

Division of Deutsche Post

- Type: Division
- Industry: Logistics
- Founders: Adrian Dalsey; Larry Hillblom; Robert Lynn
- Headquarters: Bonn, Germany
- Key people: Oscar de Bok, CEO; Jim Monkmeyer, President
- Revenue: ▲€14 billion (2016)
- Owner: Deutsche Post DHL
- Number of employees: 600,000
- Website: www.dhl.com/en/logistics/supply_chain_solutions.html

Old Logo.

DHL Supply Chain is a division of Deutsche Post DHL and is affiliated with DHL. Headquartered in Bonn, Deutsche Post has 510,000 employees.

In 2016, DHL Supply Chain was primarily competing in strategic life sciences and healthcare, automotive and technology sectors of the market. The automotive sector, with its Lead Logistics Provider (LLP) service, has been shifting to China, India and Mexico as those countries become significant vehicle and parts manufacturers. In Canadian and USA markets DHL Supply Chain operated under the name Exel until January 2016.

In 2016, the DHL Supply Chain division's revenue decreased by 11.6% to €14.0 billion versus 2015, but operating profit improved by 27.4% to €572 million.

== History ==
- 1969 – DHL founded by Adrian Dalsey, Larry Hillblom and Robert Lynn in San Francisco.
- 1971 – DHL expands its Express network. Expansion into the Far East and Pacific Rim.
- 1972 – Services introduced in Japan, Hong Kong, Singapore and Australia.
- 1974 – The first UK office is opened in London. Globally, DHL now has 3,052 customers and 314 staff.
- 1976–1978 – Expansion in three major regions as DHL launches in the Middle East, Latin America and Africa.
- 1977 – The first German DHL office is opened in Frankfurt.
- 1979 – DHL extends its services to delivering packages. Only document services had been available until now.
- 1983 – DHL is the first air express forwarder to serve Eastern European countries. An international distribution center (hub) is opened in Cincinnati, USA.
- 1985 – A hub is opened in Brussels. More than 165,000 shipments are handled each night.
- 1986 – DHL enters into a joint venture with the People's Republic of China and becomes the first express company active in China.
- 1990 – DHL enters into strategic alliances with Lufthansa, Japan Airlines and Nissho Iwai.
- 1991 – DHL becomes the first international express company to restart service to Kuwait after the Gulf War.
- 1993 – DHL invests 60 million dollars in a new hub facility in Bahrain.
- 1998 – Deutsche Post becomes a shareholder in DHL.
- 2002 – Deutsche Post World Net becomes the major shareholder in DHL from 1 January. By the end of the year, the company owns 100 percent of the DHL shares.
- 2003 – Deutsche Post, DHL and Postbank make up the Group's current brand architecture. DHL now serves as the exclusive brand for all express and logistics activities. DHL changes its corporate colors from red and white to yellow and red. In April, the worldwide visual transformation of all vehicles, packing materials and buildings begins.
- 2004/2005 – Directly after the tsunami in South Asia, DHL, with over 40 offices throughout the disaster region, responds immediately to requests from government and aid organizations. The Group helps with free charter flights carrying relief supplies, land transport as well as monetary donations. DHL employees from around the world launch donation campaigns. DHL Disaster Response Teams (DRT) are established, supporting the UN and the international community's disaster response efforts in the aftermath of major sudden-onset natural disasters.
- 2005 – Deutsche Post World Net acquires Exel, a British logistics corporation, in December for 5.5 billion euros.
- 2007 – The DHL Innovation Center opens near Bonn.
- 2008 – DHL opens its new European air hub at Leipzig/Halle Airport in Germany.
- 2009 – The Group presents its Strategy 2015 and is renamed as Deutsche Post DHL.

== Headquarters ==
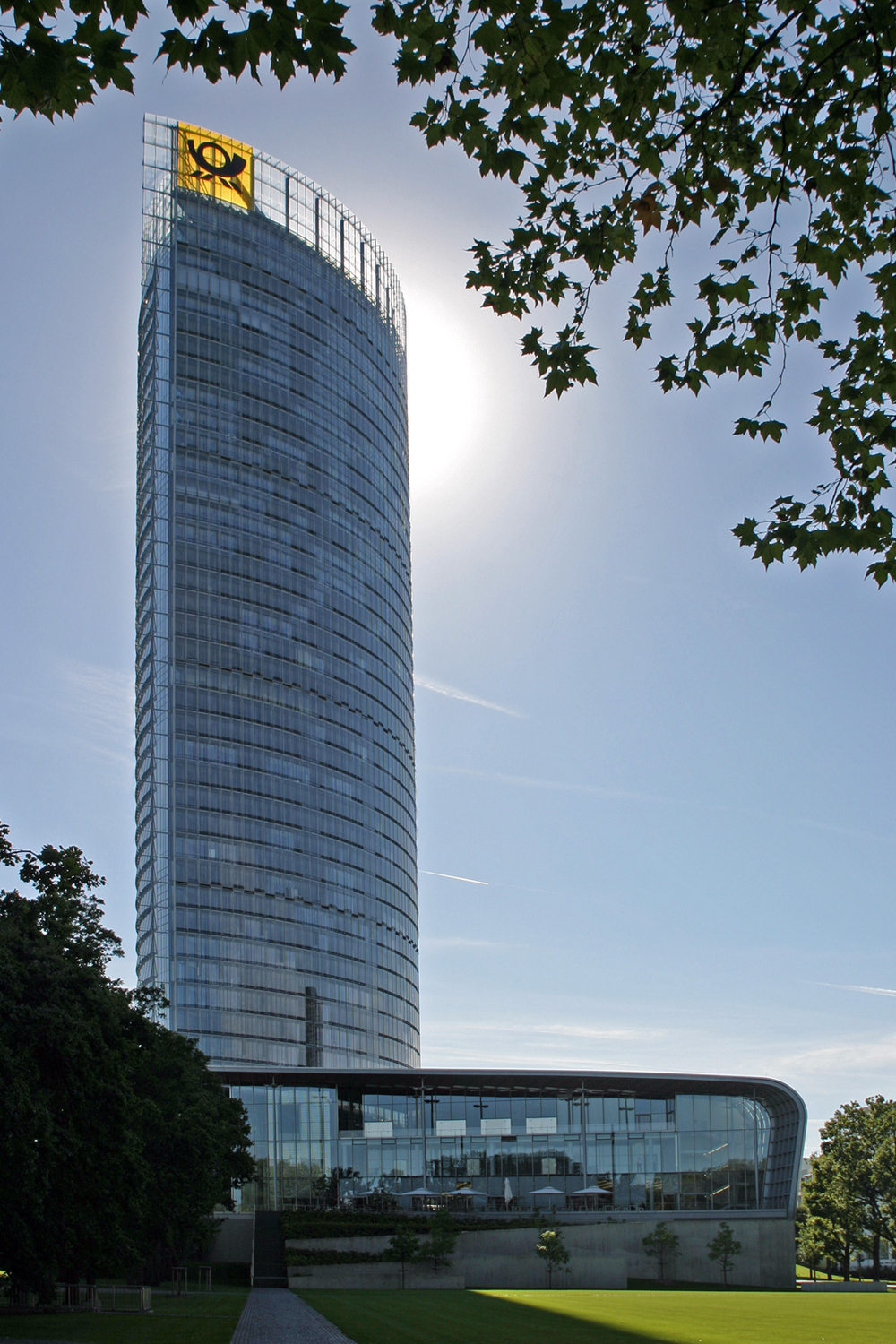
Post Tower in Bonn, Germany

DHL Supply Chain is incorporated in Bonn, Germany as a part of Deutsche Post DHL global headquarters. The main building is Post Tower. Located in the former government quarter and built using large quantities of glass, it is impressive because of its modern architecture. The tower is 162 meters (531 feet) high, 82 meters (269 feet) long and 41 meters (135 feet) wide.

== Mergers and acquisitions ==
The acquisition of the Swiss logistics provider Danzas and the largest American service provider in the field of international airfreight, Air Express International (AEI), by Deutsche Post, happened in 1999. Founded in 1815, the prestigious Danzas group was regarded as one of the world's leading logistics companies. With approximately 29,000 employees at the time of acquisition, Danzas had a strong logistics network on all continents.

The acquisition of AEI was similar. AEI had a network of branches in 135 countries. In addition to integrated logistics and multi-modal transport, it was offering warehousing, distribution, customs processing and IT-based logistics services. AEI was integrated into the Intercontinental division of Danzas. As a full-service provider, the merged companies provided Deutsche Post with a dense transport network as well as an impressive portfolio of value-added services.

The partnership with DHL International, which began with the acquisition of a minority interest in 1998, was expanded and intensified in 2000. Negotiations were then concluded, allowing Deutsche Post to establish a majority interest from 1 January 2002. In July 2002, Deutsche Post acquired a 25-percent share in DHL from Lufthansa Cargo and increased its majority stake to 75 percent.

At the time, DHL Worldwide Express had more than 71,000 employees worldwide. A pioneer in global express shipping, DHL's international network linked over 220 countries and territories. DHL became a wholly owned subsidiary of the Group in December 2002 after Deutsche Post acquired the remaining shares from two investment funds and Japan Airlines.

In December 2005, Deutsche Post acquired the British logistics company Exel for 5.5 billion euros. At that time, approximately 111,000 employees worked for Exel in 135 countries. The company concluded the first half of 2005 with a 55 percent leap in profits to 172 million pounds (251 million euros).

In 2006 Deutsche Post took a majority stake in Williams Lea, a business process outsourcing (BPO) provider specializing in document management and mail services.

In July 2011, DHL acquired Tag Worldwide, an international provider of marketing execution and production services.

In 2017, DHL sold the combined Williams Lea Tag business to Advent International.

In May 2018, DHL Supply Chain strengthened its presence in Latin America by acquiring Colombian logistics company Suppla Group. At the time of the acquisition, Suppla employed over 4,500 employees in 25 cities of Colombia.

DHL Supply Chain announced its acquisition of healthcare logistics provider, SDS Rx, in September 2025.

== Regions and sectors ==
DHL Supply Chain is organized into five regions: North America, South America, APAC (Asia Pacific), EMEA (Europe, Middle East, and Africa), and UK&I (United Kingdom and Ireland). The Exel brand was retained for North America (USA and Canada), with the headquarters for the region in Westerville, Ohio. In 2016, the Exel brand transitioned DHL Supply Chain for the North America region. DHL Supply Chain trades in six focus sectors: AEMCE (Automotive, Engineering, Manufacturing, Chemical and Energy) Consumer, Retail, Technology, Service Logistics, Life Sciences and Healthcare.

=== Consumer and retail ===
Consumer and Retail are two of DHL Supply Chain's largest sectors. Both of these offer major growth potential for the division, since DHL manages the supply chains all the way from the source of supply to the end customer. Services in these sectors range from international inbound logistics and warehouse and transport services, to packaging and other value-added services.

=== Technology ===
In the Technology sector, DHL Supply Chain's portfolio of offerings ranges from inbound-to-manufacturing services and warehouse and transport services to integrated packaging, returns management and technical services.

=== Life sciences and healthcare ===
In 2011, DHL Supply Chain acquired Eurodifarm, a specialist in the controlled-temperature distribution of pharmaceutical and diagnostic products. The purchase was made to strengthen DHL Supply Chain's market leadership in Italy in this sector.

In England, DHL Supply Chain operated the NHS Supply Chain for the National Health Service until April 2019. It has a contract for patient transport services in North London and has been criticised for poor response times to patients wanting to book a service and for refusing disabled people permission to bring an escort. The Royal Free London NHS Foundation Trust oversees the call centre.

=== Automotive ===
The automotive industry is one of DHL Supply Chain's global sectors. The company has a strong presence in emerging markets such as China, India and Brazil.

=== Energy ===
The fast-growing Energy sector is another market in which the DHL divisions provide logistics for both the build and run phases of major projects.

=== Public Sector ===
In the UK, DHL Supply Chain first won the Prison Retail Service contract in 2008; in 2022 it was reported that the company had won the contract again and that it would run until at least 2025. The contract involves supplying prisoners with their weekly 'canteen' purchases of toiletries and groceries, as well as employing and training prisoners to work in prison workshops that deliver the service.

== Products ==
In the Supply Chain business, DHL Supply Chain provides customers in many industry sectors with logistics services along the entire supply chain – from planning, sourcing, production, storage and delivery to returns logistics and value-added services – in order to ensure logistics flow.

DHL Supply Chain offers warehousing, distribution, managed transport and value-added services as well as business process outsourcing, supply chain management and consulting. DHL Supply Chain's goal is to ensure that their customers' products and information reach their markets quickly and efficiently, thus securing them competitive advantages.

Some of the key DHL Supply Chain products include: Lead Logistics Provider, Packaging Services, Integrated Logistics Procurement, Technical Services, Service Parts Logistics, e-Fulfillment, Airline Business.

== Market position ==
DHL Supply Chain was the global market leader in contract logistics with a market share of 8.3% (2010). In this highly fragmented market, the top ten players account for only about 23% of the overall market, the size of which is estimated to be €147 billion. DHL Supply Chain is the regional market leader in the regions of North America, Europe and Asia Pacific and also has a very strong position in rapidly growing markets such as Brazil, India, China and Mexico.

== Financial results ==
DHL Supply Chain, as the contract logistics business of Deutsche Post DHL, generated profitable growth in year 2011. Revenues and earnings were well above the previous year's level. The division reported a revenue increase of 1.2 percent to EUR 13.2 billion (2010: EUR 13.1 billion). As a result of portfolio adjustments made during 2011 – such as the divestment of a subsidiary in the United States that was not part of the division's core business – this result only partially reflects the division's operating performance. Adjusted for these consolidation and exchange-rate effects, SUPPLY CHAIN's revenues rose by nearly 6 percent, or more than EUR 700 million, in 2011.

This increase was fueled in particular by strong growth in the Asia-Pacific region as well as in the Life Sciences & Healthcare and Automotive sectors. Additional contracts worth EUR 1.3 billion were concluded in 2011, an increase of around EUR 200 million versus the previous year. Combined with additional operating improvements and strict cost management, increased business activity drove up the division's earnings in 2011. At EUR 362 million, the operating earnings were 56.7 percent above the previous year's level of EUR 231 million.
