= Astar Air Cargo =

American cargo airline

ASTAR Air Cargo
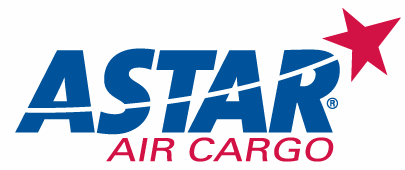
IATA	ICAO	Call sign
ER	DHL	DAHL
- Founded: 1969; 57 years ago
- Ceased operations: June 1, 2012; 14 years ago
- Hubs: Cincinnati; Wilmington OH (2004-2009)
- Fleet size: 8
- Destinations: 18
- Parent company: DHL (49.5%)
- Headquarters: Miami, Florida, United States
- Key people: John Dasburg (Chairman and CEO); Stephen C. Dodd (CFO)
- Website: www.astaraircargo.us

ASTAR Air Cargo Inc. was an American cargo airline based in Miami, Florida. Its main base was Cincinnati Northern Kentucky International Airport in Hebron, Kentucky, with hubs at Miami International Airport and Los Angeles International Airport. It was owned by John Dasburg, Richard Blum and Michael Klein.

== History ==
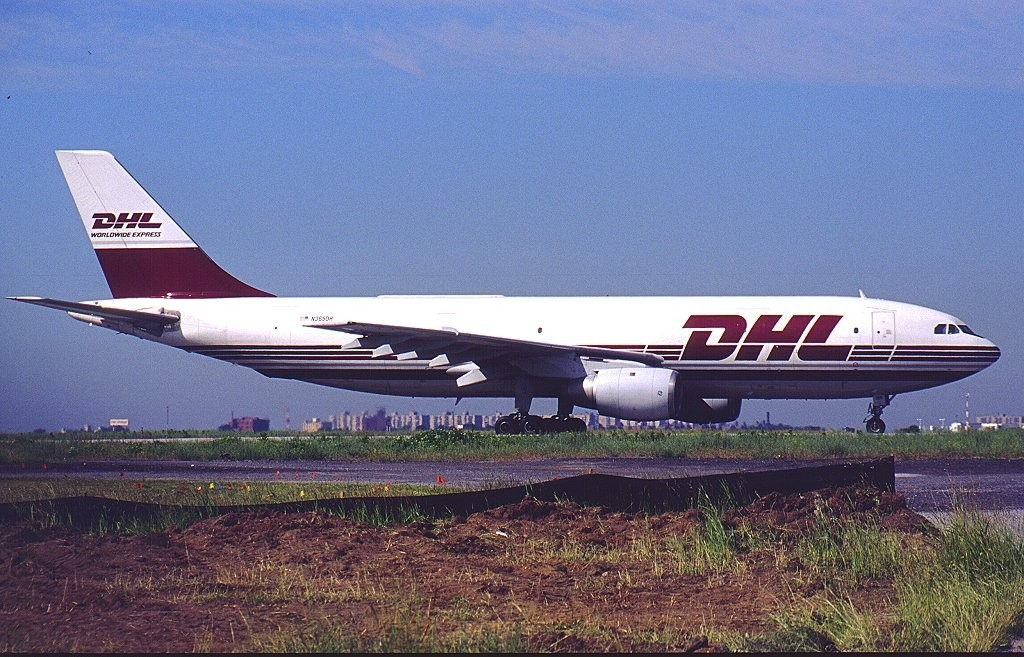
DHL Airways Airbus A300B4F

The airline was established and started operations in 1969. It was formed as DHL Worldwide Express by Adrian Dalsey, Larry Hillblom and Robert Lynn. The airline was spun off from DHL and a majority stake sold to a private investor in order to comply with federal foreign ownership laws. FedEx and UPS challenged the U.S. citizenship of DHL Airways, asserting to the Department of Transportation that DPWN exercised effective operational control of the airline. The airline rebranded as DHL Airways on December 22, 1981, and grew rapidly, initiating services to Asia and Australia.

In July 2003, John Dasburg completed a management buy-out of the airline and rebranded to ASTAR Air Cargo on June 30, 2003, with its two target customers remaining to be DHL and the United States Air Force. In 2007, DHL bought 49.5% of nonvoting and 24.5% of voting stock and added a member to the board of ASTAR Air Cargo.

On May 28, 2008, DHL announced the plan to terminate its business relationship with ASTAR by outsourcing the air transportation to its competitor UPS. In May 2009 DHL terminated their plan to outsource to UPS and ASTAR continued operating out of DHL's CVG facility.

The company decided to shut down its cargo operations when its contract with DHL was terminated abruptly effective on June 1, 2012. All remaining active aircraft were put in storage.

== Destinations ==
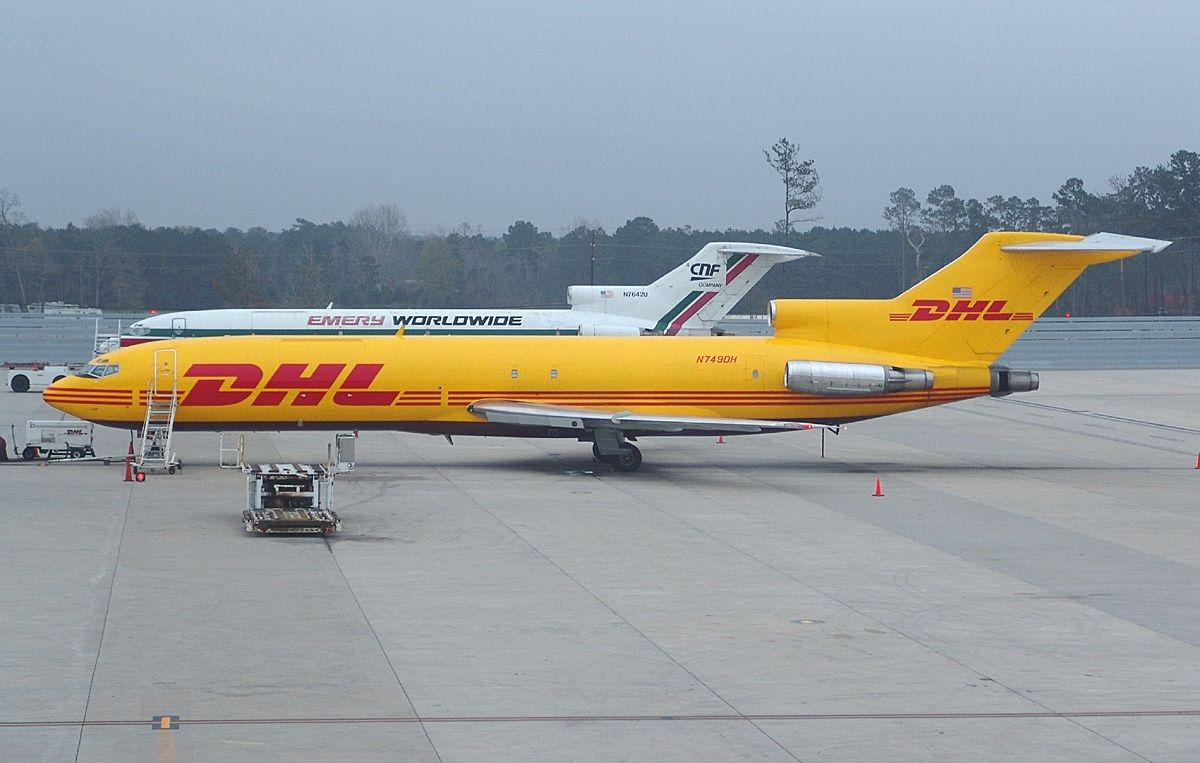
DHL Airways Boeing 727-200F

ASTAR Air Cargo operated the following freight destinations until operations were ended as of June 1, 2012:

- Canada
  - Hamilton, Ontario (John C. Munro Hamilton International Airport)
- Mexico
  - Mexico City (Mexico City International Airport)
- United States
  - Atlanta, Georgia (Hartsfield-Jackson Atlanta International Airport)
  - Boston, Massachusetts (Logan International Airport)
  - Cincinnati, Ohio (Cincinnati/Northern Kentucky International Airport) Hub
  - Denver, Colorado (Denver International Airport)
  - Greensboro, North Carolina (Piedmont Triad International Airport)
  - Houston, Texas (George Bush Intercontinental Airport)
  - Harlingen, Texas (Valley International Airport)
  - Memphis, Tennessee (Memphis International Airport)
  - Miami, Florida (Miami International Airport)
  - Minneapolis and St. Paul, Minnesota (Minneapolis-Saint Paul International Airport)
  - Nashville, Tennessee (Nashville International Airport)
  - Newark, New Jersey (Newark Liberty International Airport)
  - Orlando, Florida (Orlando International Airport)
  - Saint Louis, Missouri (Lambert St. Louis International Airport)
  - Salt Lake City, Utah (Salt Lake City International Airport)
  - Toledo, Ohio (Toledo Express Airport)

== Fleet ==
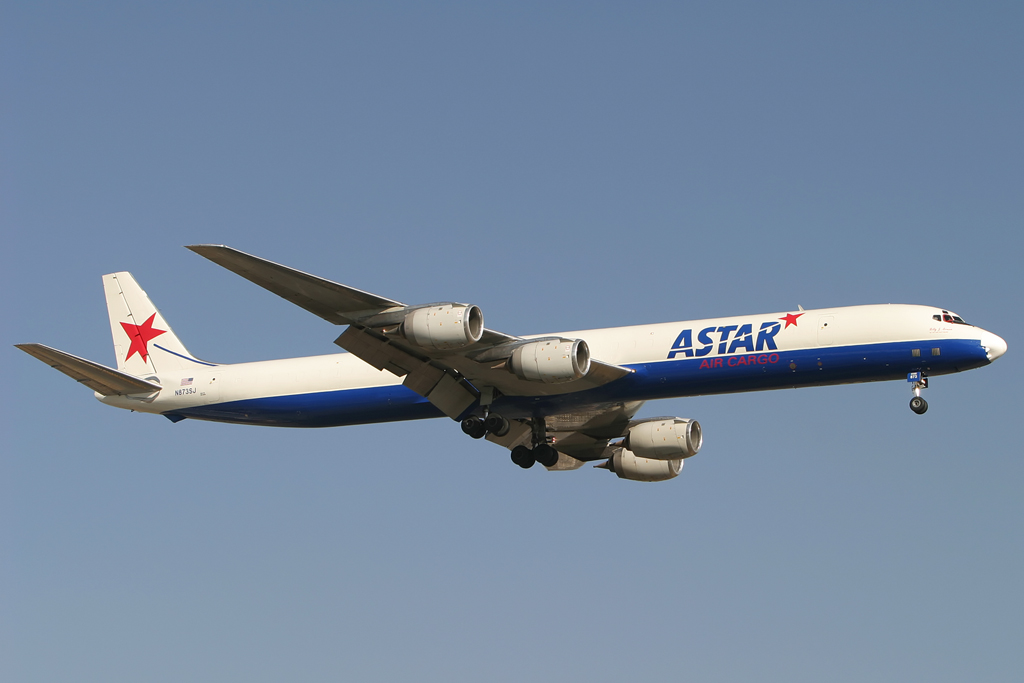
Astar Air Cargo Douglas DC-8-70CF

The ASTAR Air Cargo fleet consisted of the following aircraft:

ASTAR Air Cargo fleet
Aircraft	Total	Introduced	Retired	Notes
Airbus A300B4-100F	1	1999	1999	Use for spare parts only
Airbus A300B4-200F	7	1999	2009	
Bell 206 B-2	1	Unknown	Unknown	
Bell 206 L-1	1	Unknown	Unknown	
Boeing 727-100F	11	1984	2004	
Boeing 727-200F	14	1990	2009	
Convair CV-580	1	1989	1990	Leased from European Air Transport
Douglas DC-8-73CF	5	1995	2012	
Douglas DC-8-73F	5	1993	2012	
Learjet 35A	1	1983	1999	
Fairchild Swearingen Metroliner	12	1984	1995	

== Accidents and incidents ==
- On August 31, 1998, a Boeing 727-200F (registered N722DH) suffered an engine failure on the 2nd engine shortly after taking off from John F. Kennedy International Airport. The crew declared an emergency and requested to return to the airport. Shortly after landing, the right main gear failed and the aircraft slid through the runway to a stop. The 3 flight crew members and 2 jumpseat riders were not injured.

== See also ==
- List of defunct airlines of the United States
