= John Anthony Harvey =

British entrepreneur and logistician (born 1935)

John Harvey
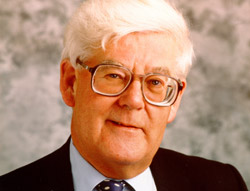
- John Anthony Harvey CBE
- Born: October 1, 1935
- Occupations: Entrepreneur & logistician

John Anthony Harvey CBE (born 1 October 1935) is a British entrepreneur and logistician whose seminal contribution was to lead (as chairman and chief executive, later executive chairman) the intercontinental logistics service provider Tibbett & Britten Group plc during a 20-year period of diversification and growth. He is an ambassador, and former chairman of the trustees, of Transaid Worldwide - the international transport charity. Since 2004 he has chaired The Keswick Enterprises Group Limited, a UK-based private equity investor.

== Early career ==
Harvey joined Unilever in 1957 as a graduate trainee after receiving a First Class Honours degree from the University of Cambridge and held a variety of appointments before becoming Managing Director of SPD Ltd (‘Speedy, Prompt Delivery’), its UK logistics subsidiary. In 1968, he was (significantly) responsible for Unilever making its original investment in the clothing distribution specialist Tibbett & Britten, followed in 1970 by the acquisition of Norfolk Line (Norfolk Lijn N.V.), the North Sea ferry company. From 1971, he went on to hold various SPD Board appointments in subsidiaries and joint ventures in North America, Scandinavia, Hong Kong, Italy and Ireland. He also became a member of Unilever's UK Policy Committee. In 1982, Harvey joined The Institute of Grocery Distribution Board (and the Policy Issues Council from mid-2001). In 1983, he became Chairman of SPD Group.

In 1984, Harvey led the management buy-out of Tibbett & Britten from Unilever and the Dutch Railways, becoming chairman and chief executive of Tibbett & Britten. (SPD continued without him for another year, after which it was purchased by National Freight Corporation, which later combined it with BRS and NCL to create the proto Exel Logistics.) Harvey then led the flotation of Tibbett & Britten Group plc on the London Stock Exchange in 1986, following which the Group's extraordinary growth began.

Under Harvey's leadership, Tibbett & Britten Group revenues rose from £30 million in 1984 to £1,600 million two decades later – when it operated in 34 countries and employed 38,000 people. The company was acquired by Exel in 2004.

Harvey was appointed a CBE for services to the transport industry in 1992. In 1994, he received the Motor Transport Special Award for outstanding achievement in the Road Transport Industry. In 2002, Tibbett & Britten Group received The Queen's Award for Enterprise: International Trade (Export). In 2011, Harvey was named Freight Personality of the Year.

Harvey is also a former member of the DoE's Environmental Committee, where he was involved with the application of environmental best practice in the logistics and consumer distribution industries. Between 1975 and 2006 he was a non-executive Board member of New Covent Garden Market Authority, Dawsongroup plc, Sygen International plc and Unique Group Limited (HK).

Although he did not invent 'open-book contract’ principles, Harvey developed and hugely popularised this type of commercial relationship between third-party logistics providers and their customers – where fixed management fees are charged and costs are transparent to both parties.

== Later career ==
In 2004 with Geoff Gillo Harvey set up Keswick Enterprises – a UK-based private equity investor focused on activities within the logistics and supply chain sectors. The business has made investments and disposals within the UK and mainland Europe – including Hungary, Poland and Romania.

In 2006, Keswick acquired Spatial Group – international freight forwarding and international mail services. In 2008, Keswick acquired Link Logistics – UK transport and distribution - and Strategy Group – contract packing and contract manufacturing. In 2010 Keswick acquired Delamode Logistics in Romania and the DHL Delamode joint venture in Romania – which were then rebranded as Tibbett Logistics. and subsequently developed to become a leading independent nationwide logistics service provider, with its own intermodal terminal and trains. In December 2017, this business was sold to Yusen Logistics. In February 2020, Keswick Enterprises acquired Assembly and Packaging Services Ltd (known as APS) - a non-food co-packing and fulfilment business based in Blyth, Northumberland, England.

Keswick Enterprises has other investments in co-packing, freight forwarding, recycling, supply chain consultancy and specialist M&A activities.

== Academic life and charity ==
In 1997, Harvey became visiting professor at the Cranfield School of Management/Cranfield University. In the same year he also became a Companion of The Institute of Management. In the following year he was made chairman of the Cranfield Centre for Logistics & Transportation Advisory Board, Cranfield University, and he became a member of the CIES International Supply Chain and Logistics Forum. In 1999, he became a member of the DTLR Road Haulage Forum.

From 2000 to 2010, Harvey was chairman of trustees of Transaid Worldwide, the international transport charity. He remains a Transaid Ambassador and staunch supporter. He is a Fellow of the Chartered Institute of Transport, the Institute of Grocery Distribution, the Institute of Logistics and Transport (Emeritus) and the Royal Society of Arts.

In 2015, he set-up the Keswick Enterprises Charitable Trust as a private charitable foundation, and is Chairman of its Trustees. The Trust currently supports Christian, educational, and social projects within the United Kingdom, the Balkans, and Africa.

Harvey still regularly addresses freight, logistics and supply chain management audiences across the world, and chairs conferences and seminars.
