= Dalat Palace Hotel =

Historic luxury hotel in Da Lat, Vietnam

Coordinates: 11°56′15.3″N 108°26′25.72″E

- Khách sạn Dalat Palace
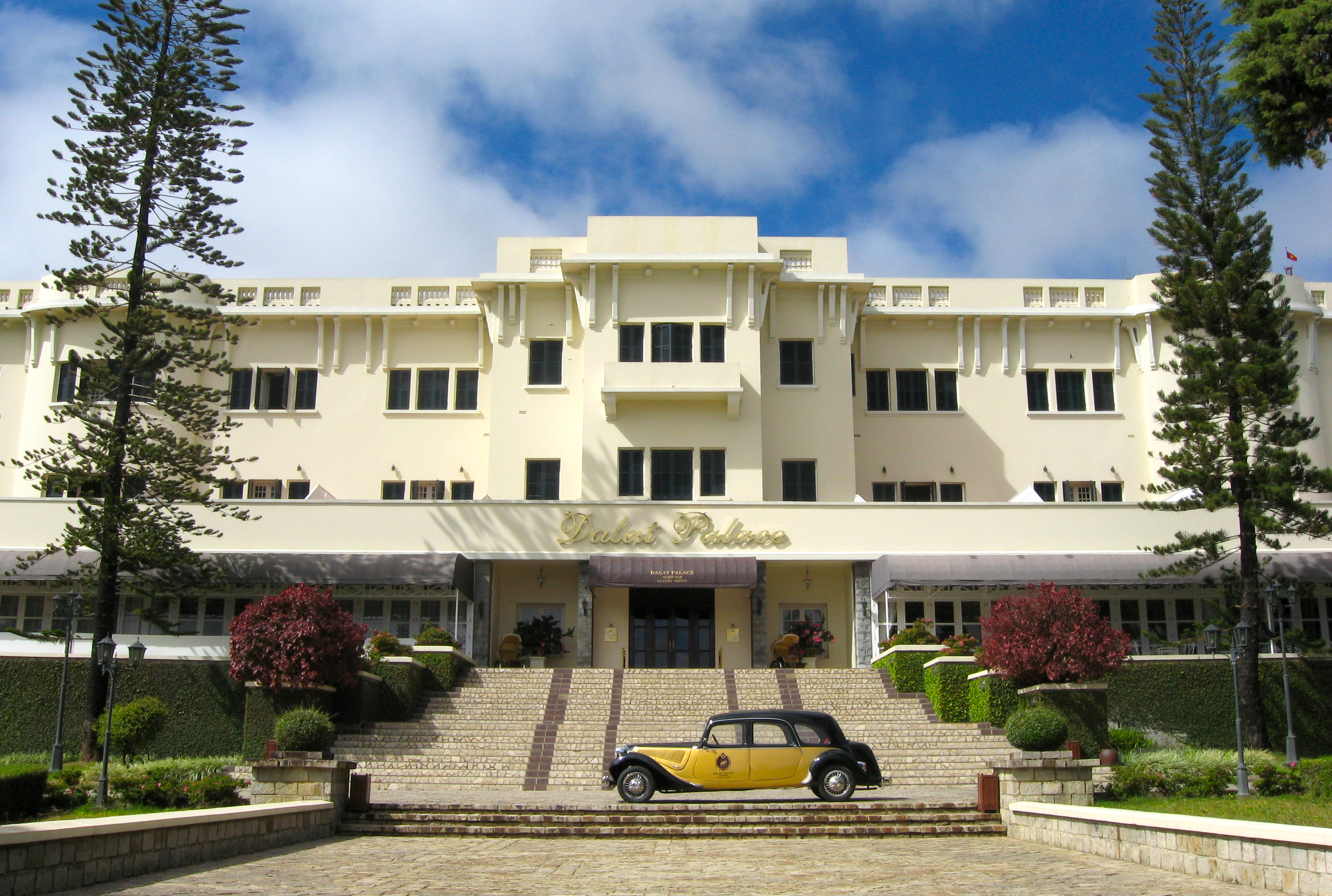
- The hotel main entrance
- Interactive map of the Dalat Palace Hotel area
- Former names: Langbian Palace (before Second World War); Dalat Sofitel Palace
- Alternative names: Dalat Palace Heritage Hotel

General information
- Status: Completed
- Location: Xuân Hương Lake, No.2 Trần Phú Street, Ward 3, Đà Lạt, Lâm Đồng Province, Vietnam
- Groundbreaking: 1916; 110 years ago
- Inaugurated: 1922; 104 years ago

Height
- Top floor: 2

Technical details
- Floor count: 3
- Floor area: 62.5 ha (6,730,000 sq ft)

Other information
- Number of rooms: 73 (Classic area: 43 rooms – Modern area: 30 rooms)
- Number of suites: 12 (including 1 Presidential Suite)
- Number of restaurants: 5
- Number of bars: 1

Website
- Dalat Palace Hotel

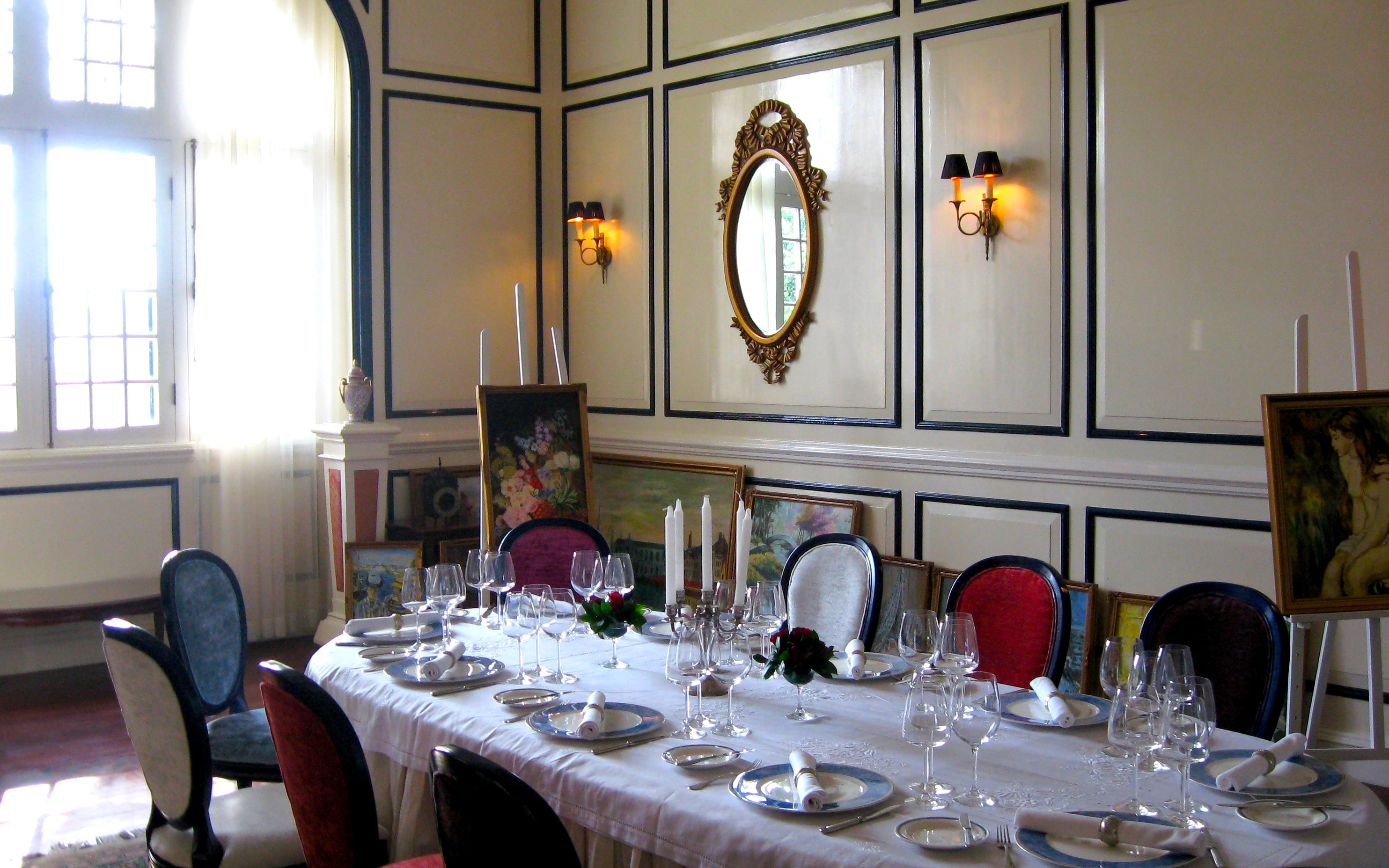
Private dining room

The Dalat Palace (Vietnamese: Khách sạn Dalat Palace, French: Hôtel Dalat Palace) is a historic luxury hotel in Da Lat, Vietnam. It was frequented by the colonial French as a popular get-away. The hotel is located at 2 Tran Phu Street, just across from the Xuân Hương Lake from Thủy Tạ Restaurant, next to Lâm Đồng Radio and Television Station, Lâm Viên Square and Trần Hưng Đạo Park.

== History ==
Originally called the Lang-Bian Palace Hotel, it was completed and opened in 1922, at the height of an economic boom, and was designed to be a site of colonial leisure and power. 'The hotels monumentalism, modernity, luxury and location made it a conspicuous symbol of French domination over the Indochinese central highlands.' It was positioned at the centre of a European business and administrative quarter, dominated the "native quarters" and served as a buffer between them and the European villas. As a luxurious establishment it could act also as a serene base from which to explore highland minority villages or conduct big-game expeditions, and meant to compete with the poshest colonial hotels of Southeast Asia, such as the Oriental Hotel, Bangkok and the Raffles Hotel, Singapore. It initially featured thirty-eight luxury rooms, as well as an orchestra, a cinema, tennis courts, private fruit and vegetable gardens, a dance hall, riding facilities, gymnastic equipment and a French restaurant. Architecturally the Palace followed metropolitan French resort styles, merging elements of spa towns like Vittel with seaside architectural elements borrowed from towns like Cabourg or Cannes. French novelist Morgan Sportès, in his depiction of Indochina during WW2, has described it as reminiscent of the Negresco Hotel, in Nice. When economic circumstances changed, later in the 1920s, most plans for government structures in Dalat were abandoned, leaving the town with a Palace Hotel as its monumental centerpiece.

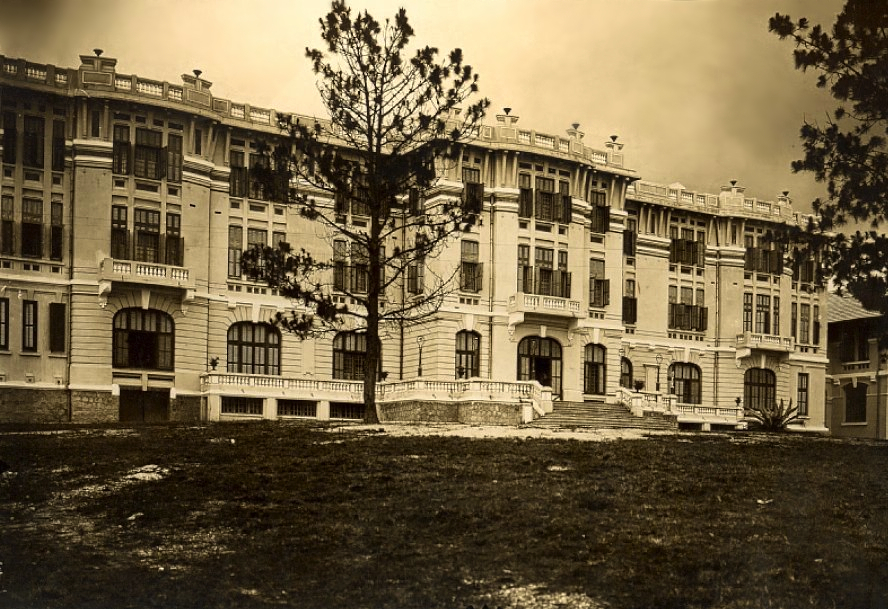
The Lang-Bian Palace Hotel in the 1920s - before Vichy governor general of Indochina, Jean Decoux, in 1943, got rid of the ornate façade.

In 1925 a city health inspection reported that the kitchens and their surroundings exhibited, "a condition of considerable filth".

In 1943, under the Vichy governor general of Indochina, Admiral Decoux, the façade was altered, and changed to a starker exterior. This was 'almost certainly inspired by architect Paul Vesseyre's two other 'Palaces' in Dalat, Bao Dai's and the governor generals, built in 1934 and 1937 respectively, in a style more of art deco or even Bauhaus than of the fin-de-siècle spa style.' Decoux did not like what he regarded as out-dated ornamentation and was part of a movement at this time to simplify complex lines and to cut out rococo elements. Other examples of Decoux's attitude were the treatment he visited upon the palace of the governor general of Cochinchina in Saigon, removing the two caryatids, and the celebrated Saigon theatre, whose statues and bas-reliefs were destroyed on Decoux's orders.

The Lang-Bian/Dalat Palace became the Dalat Palace after the Second World War, -although earlier uses of the latter also exist.

In the early 1990s reclusive tycoon Larry Hillblom set out upon a lavish restoration project - a rather plain dining room was converted into a grand restaurant for example, and the hotel was aimed at attracting high-end tourism. Hillblom, (the 'H' of the DHL courier empire), invested around forty million dollars into reviving the hotel, that had languished since the end of the Vietnam War in 1975.

== Literature ==
- William Warren, Jill Gocher (2007). Asia's legendary hotels: the romance of travel. Singapore: Periplus Editions. ISBN 978-0-7946-0174-4.
