= Open-book contract =

In an open-book contract, the buyer and seller of work/services agree on (1) which costs are remunerable and (2) the margin that the supplier can add to these costs. The project is then invoiced to the customer based on the actual costs incurred plus the agreed margin. It is essentially the same as what is known (especially in the U.S.) as a cost-plus contract.

This contract form is popular to ensure that a competitive price is obtained, for instance in cases where tender competitions are impractical. It is also useful if the work is difficult to specify precisely up front, or if the buyer is not willing to pay for the risk-premium that sellers typically add when giving fixed prices.

Frequently, an incentive is included for the supplier to give a realistic price and to minimize the costs during the project. Typically, the mechanism for such an incentive is that the supplier gets a bonus or penalty calculated as a percentage of the difference between the real cost of the project and an estimate provided up front. (Note: Setting the percentage at 100% would make the pricing identical to that of an EPCI contract).

Open-book contracts in third-party logistics services were popularised by John Anthony Harvey CBE, head of Tibbett & Britten Group plc, between 1984 and 2004.

UK public sector bodies are required to consider open book contracting across their contracting portfolio.

== See also ==
- EPCI
- EPCM
