= DHL =

Ground and express delivery company

- Type: Subsidiary
- Industry: Courier
- Founded: 1969 in San Francisco, California, United States
- Founders: Adrian Dalsey; Larry Hillblom; Robert Lynn
- Headquarters: Bonn, Germany
- Area served: Worldwide
- Key people: Tobias Meyer (CEO)
- Products: DHL Express Worldwide; DHL Express 9:00; DHL Express 10:30; DHL Express 12:00
- Services: Package delivery; Express mail; Freight forwarding; Third-party logistics
- Revenue: ▲€84.186 billion (2024)
- Number of employees: ▼580,580 (Q1 2025)
- Parent: DHL Group
- Website: dhl.com

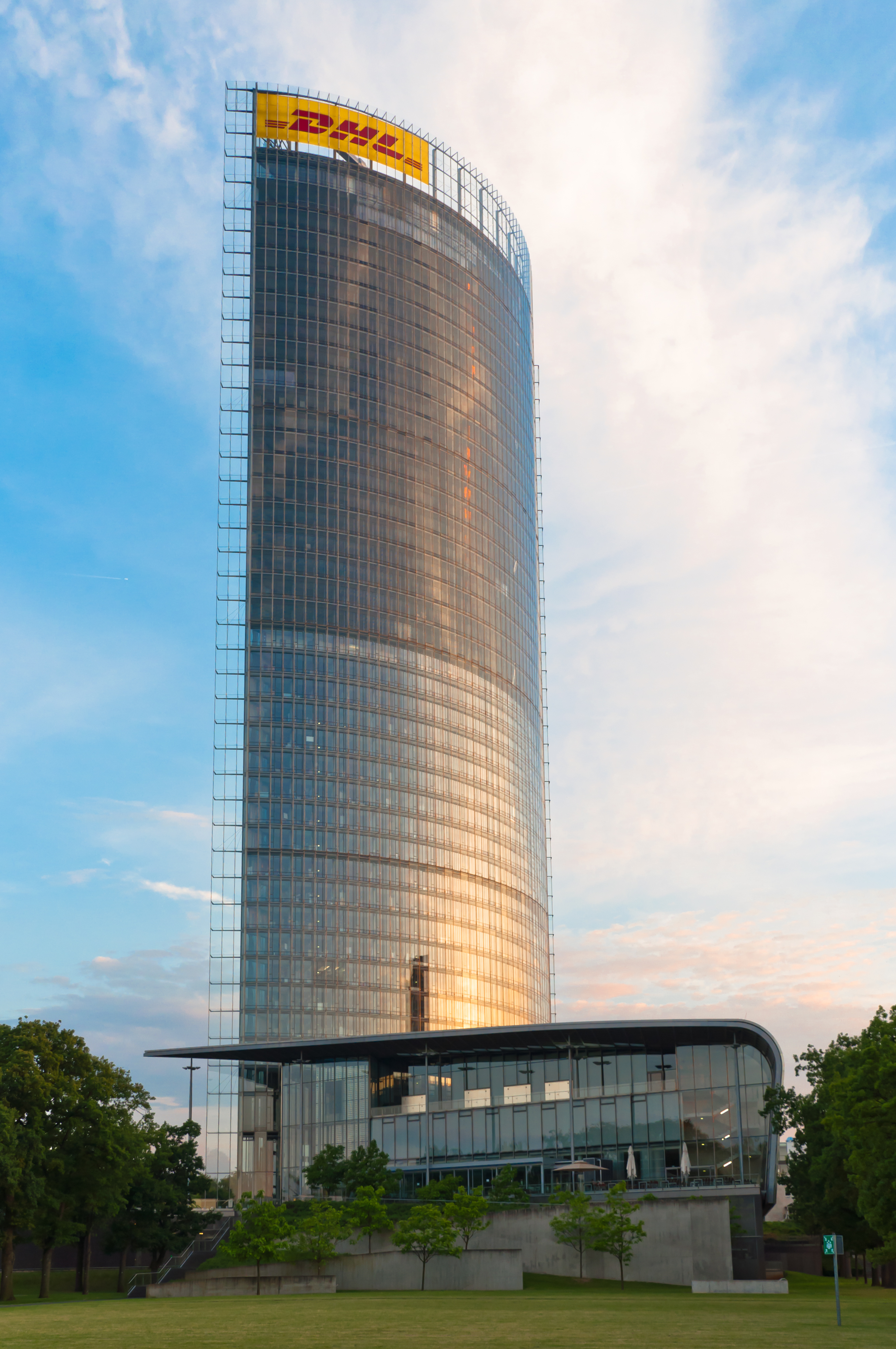
Post Tower, the DHL and DHL Group headquarters in Bonn, Germany

DHL (originally named after founders Dalsey, Hillblom and Lynn) is a multinational logistics company, founded in the United States and headquartered in Bonn, Germany. It provides courier, package delivery, and express mail service, delivering over 1.7 billion parcels per year. A subsidiary and the namesake of DHL Group, its express mail service DHL Express is one of the market leaders for parcel services in Europe. DHL also operates a separate parcel service targeting the German consumer market in conjunction with Deutsche Post.

The company DHL itself was founded in San Francisco, California, in 1969 and expanded its service throughout the world by the late 1970s.

The company was primarily interested in offshore and intercontinental deliveries, but the success of FedEx prompted DHL's own domestic (intra-US) expansion starting in 1983. In 1998, Deutsche Post began to acquire shares in DHL. It reached controlling interest in 2001, and acquired all outstanding shares by December 2002. The company then absorbed DHL into its Express division, while expanding the use of the DHL brand to other Deutsche Post divisions, business units, and subsidiaries. Today, DHL Express shares its DHL brand with business units such as DHL Global Forwarding and DHL Supply Chain. It gained a foothold in the United States when it acquired Airborne Express in 2003.

== History ==
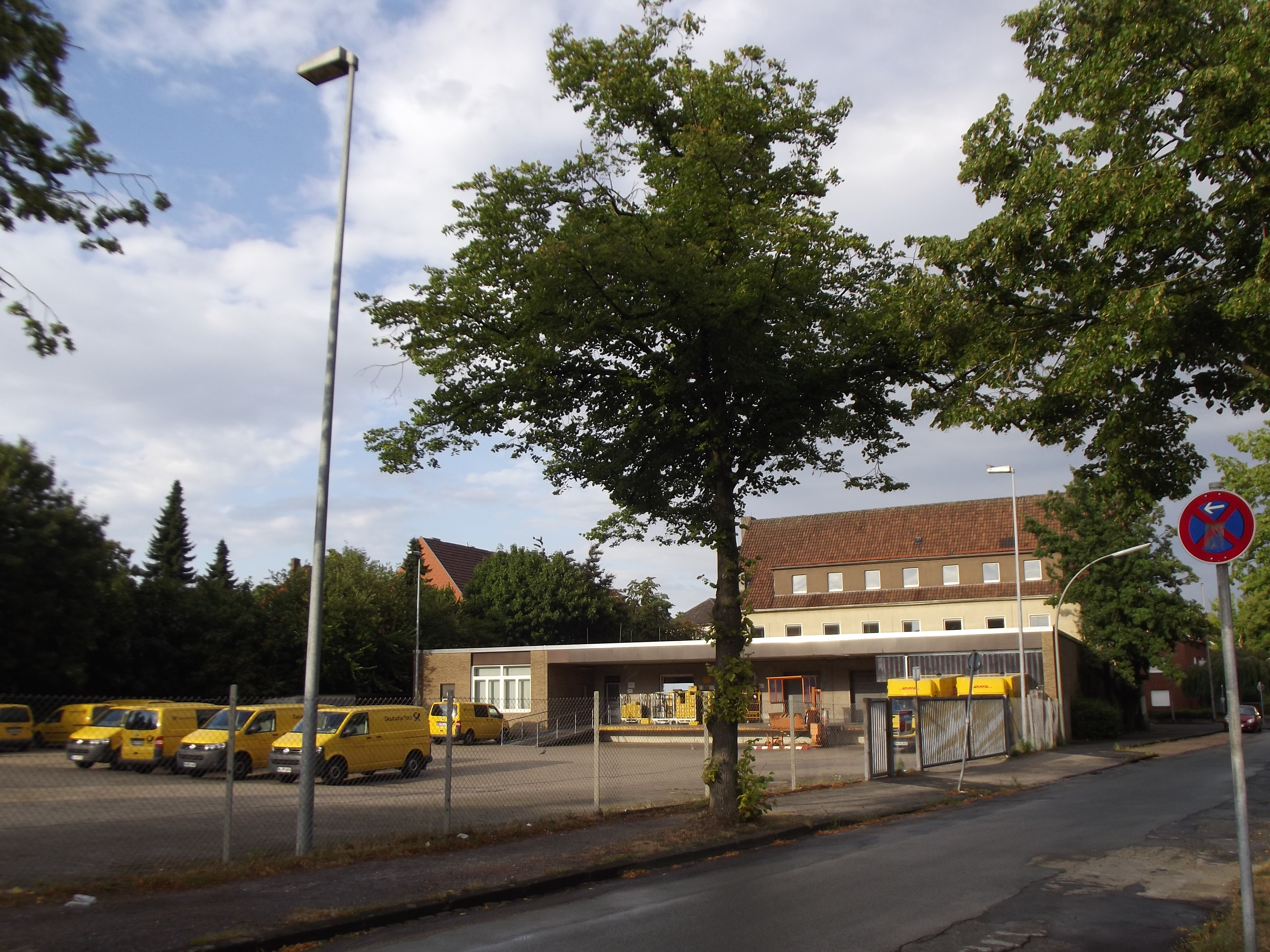
Traditional DHL subsidiary in Steinfurt (Germany) sharing premises and logistics with Deutsche Post

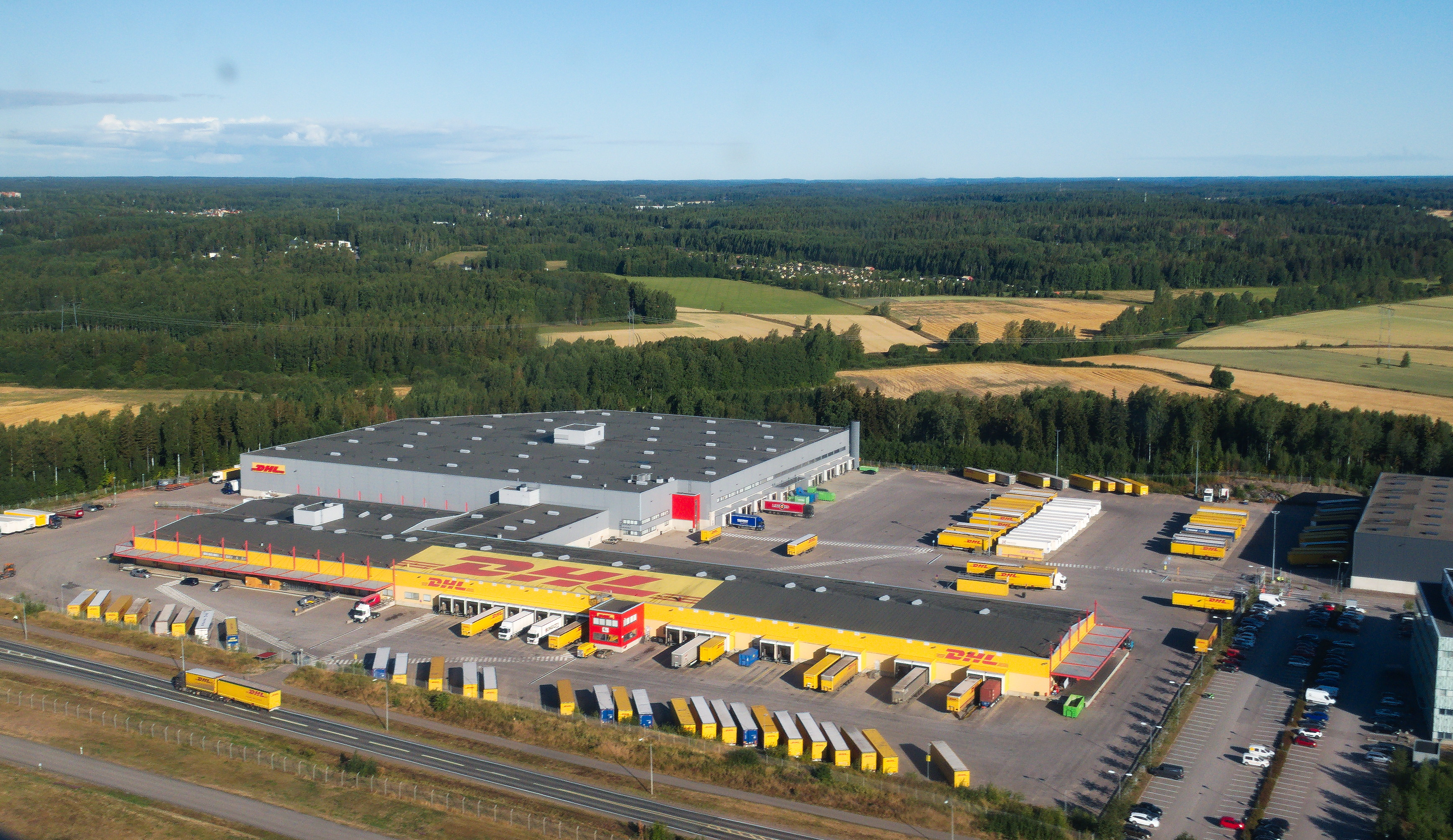
DHL distribution centre in Vantaa

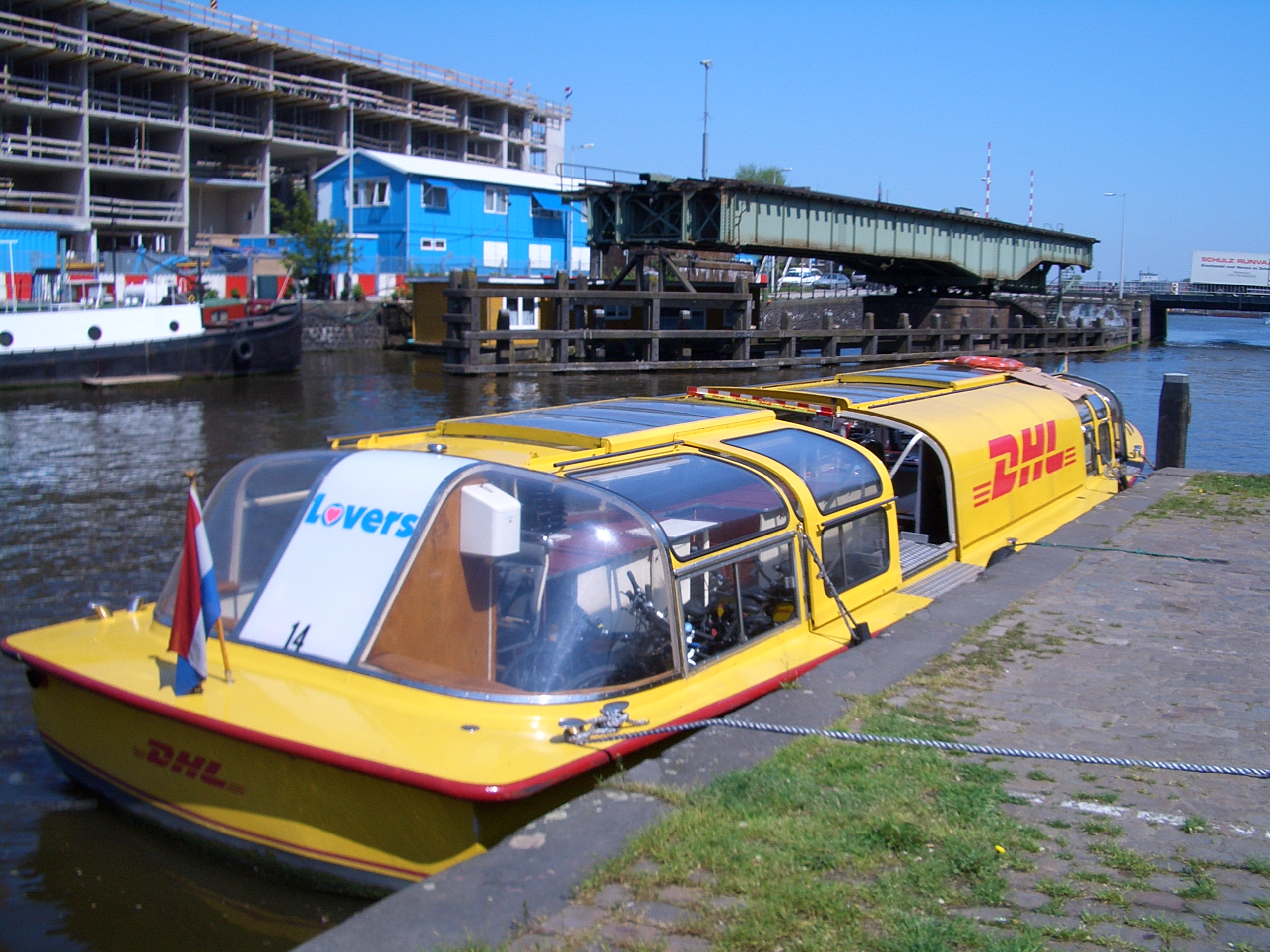
DHL boat in Amsterdam, carrying DHL delivery bicycles on board

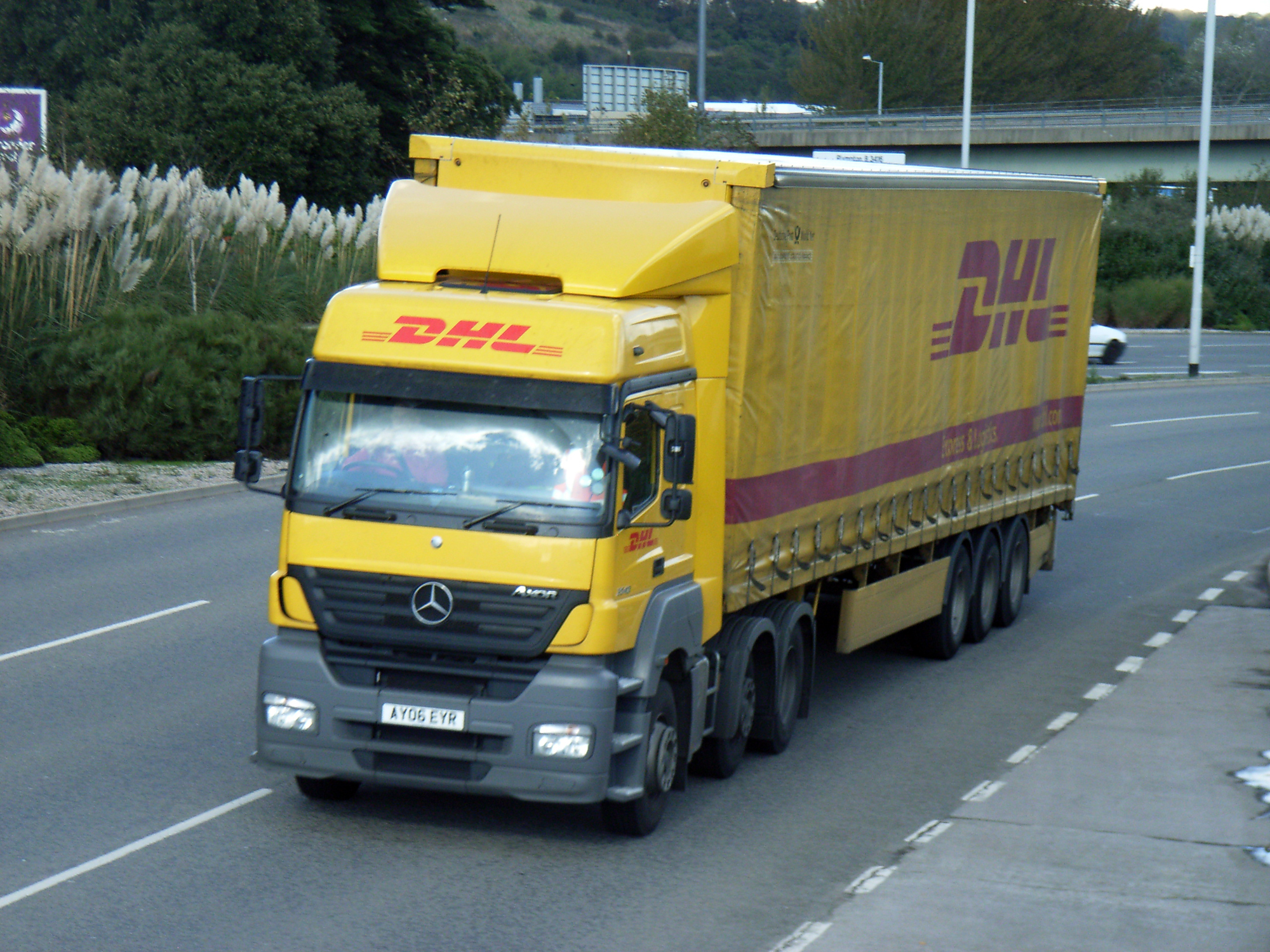
DHL semi-truck

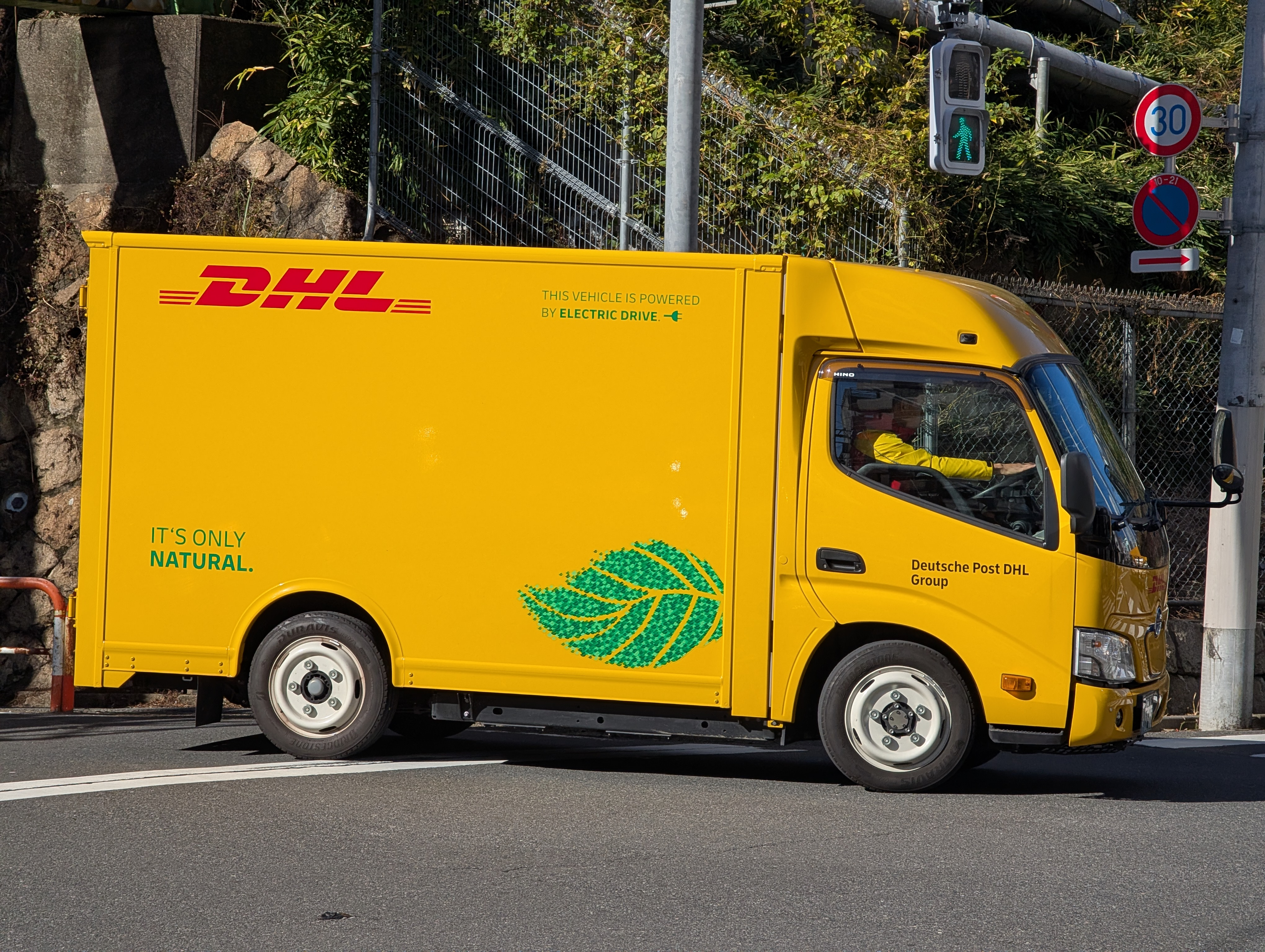
DHL delivery vehicle in Shibuya Japan

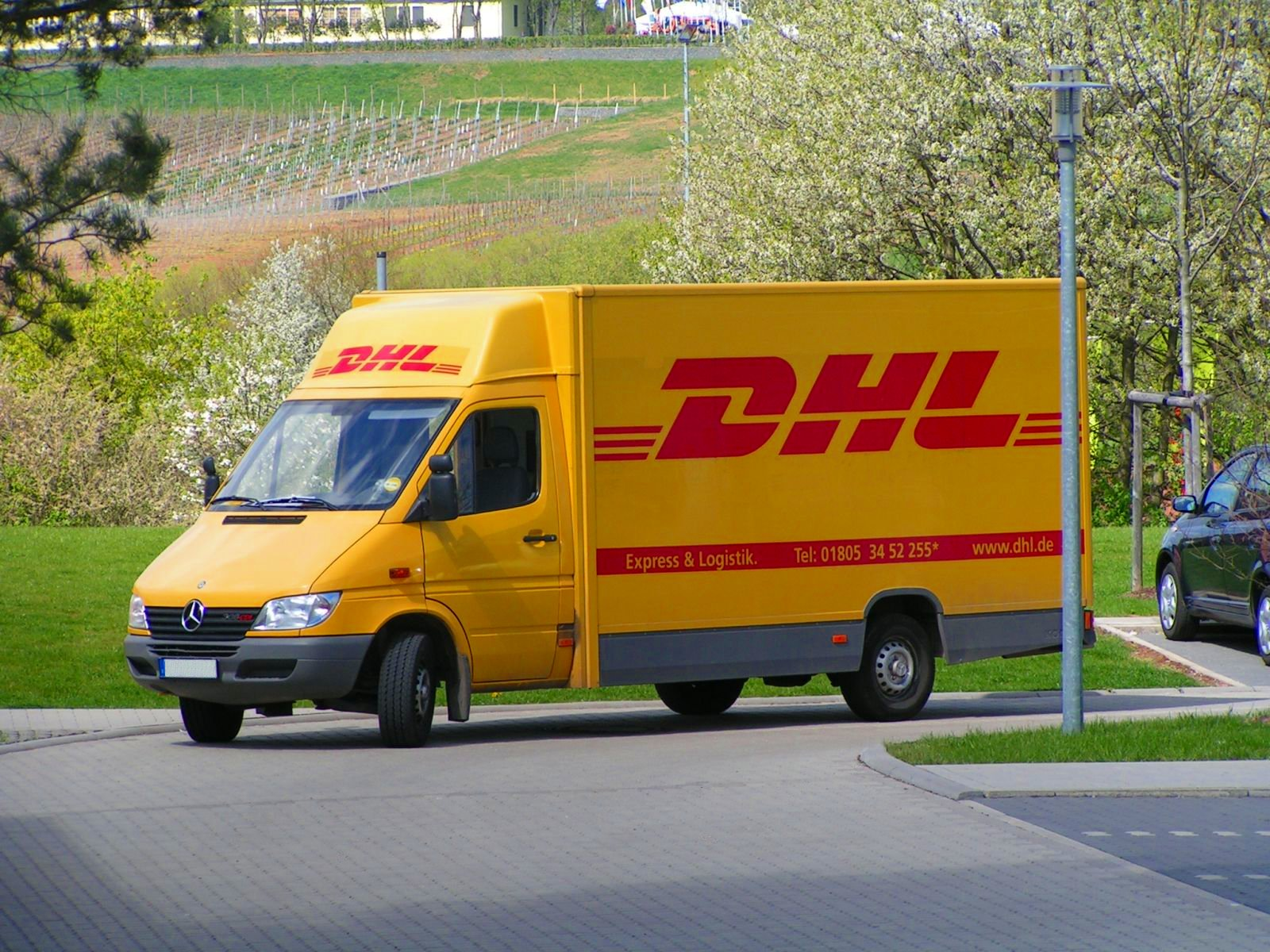
DHL delivery vehicle in Germany

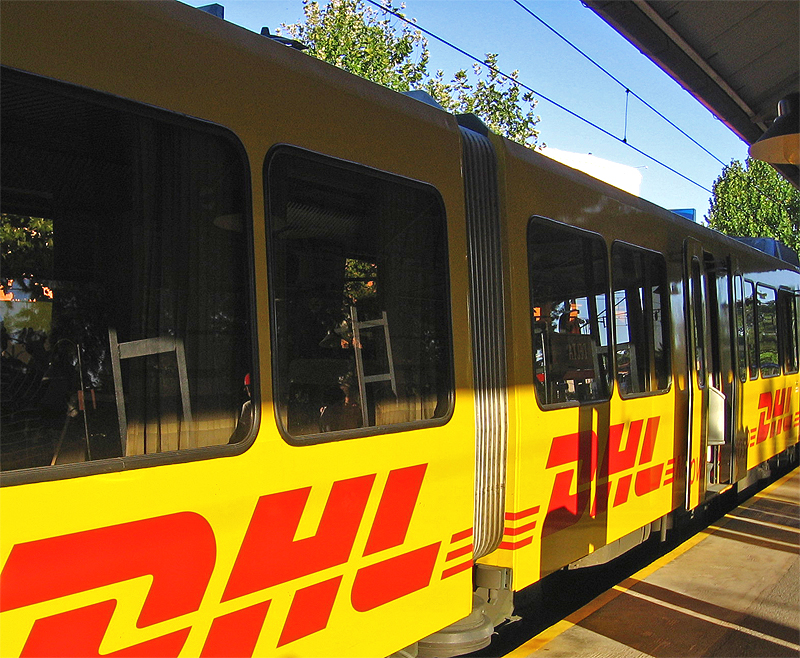
DHL advertising on the Tren de la Costa light railway, Buenos Aires

=== Origins ===
While Larry Hillblom was studying law at University of California, Berkeley's Boalt Hall School of Law in the late 1960s, he accepted a job as a courier for the insurance company Michael's, Poe & Associates (MPA). He started running courier duty between Oakland International Airport and Los Angeles International Airport, picking up packages for the last flight of the day, and returning on the first flight the next morning, up to five times a week.

After he graduated, Hillblom met with MPA salesman Adrian Dalsey and they planned to expand MPA's concept of fast delivery to other business enterprises. They flew between Honolulu and San Francisco, transporting bills of lading for their first client, Seatrain Lines.

==== Name origins ====
Hillblom put up a portion of his student loans to start the company, bringing in his two friends Adrian Dalsey and Robert Lynn as partners, with the combined initials of their surnames as the company name (DHL). They shared a Plymouth Duster that they drove around San Francisco to pick up the documents in suitcases, then rushed to the airport to book flights using another relatively new invention, the corporate credit card. As the business took off, they started hiring new couriers to join the company. Their first hires were Max and Blanche Kroll, whose apartment in Hawaii often became a makeshift flophouse for their couriers.

=== Domestic expansion ===
In the 1970s, DHL became an international delivery company, similar to Loomis and Purolator who were the only other international courier companies at the time. In 1979, under the name of DHL Air Cargo, the company entered the Hawaiian Islands with an inter-island cargo service using two Douglas DC-3 and four DC-6 aircraft. Adrian Dalsey and Larry Hillblom personally oversaw the daily operations until its eventual bankruptcy closed the doors in 1983. At its peak, DHL Air Cargo employed just over 100 workers, management and pilots.

The only major competitor in the overnight market was Federal Express (FedEx), which did not open its first international service until 1981, expanding to Toronto, Ontario, Canada. Nevertheless, the domestic market was extremely profitable, and DHL was the third largest courier behind FedEx and UPS.

=== Deutsche Post purchase ===
Deutsche Post began to acquire shares in DHL in 1998, acquiring a controlling interest in 2001. By the end of 2002, Deutsche Post had acquired all of DHL's remaining stock (the remaining 49%), and absorbed the operation into its Express division. The DHL brand was expanded to other Deutsche Post divisions, business units and subsidiaries. Today, DHL Express shares its DHL brand with other Deutsche Post business units, such as DHL Global Forwarding, DHL Freight, DHL Supply Chain, and DHL Global Mail. In 1999, Deutsche Post World Net (DPWN) purchased the Dutch shipping company Van Gend & Loos as well as Swiss freight forwarder Danzas. The new DHL was launched by merging the old DHL, Danzas, and Securicor Omega Euro Express. The Packstation, an automated delivery booth, was introduced as a pilot project in Dortmund and Mainz.

=== 2000–2010 ===
DHL Airways, Inc., which handled all US domestic flights, was renamed ASTAR Air Cargo in 2003, following a management buyout. DHL's airline had over 550 pilots in service in October 2008. In August 2003, Deutsche Post acquired Airborne Express and began its integration into DHL.

A planned expansion by DHL at Brussels Airport created a political crisis in Belgium in 2004. On 21 October 2004, DHL Express announced that it planned to move its European hub from Brussels to Leipzig, Germany (Vatry, France, was also considered but rejected). DHL's unions called a strike in response and paralysed work for a day.

On 8 November 2004, DHL Express invested €120 million in an Indian domestic courier, Blue Dart, becoming the majority shareholder in the company.

In 2005, Deutsche Post made an offer to buy the contract logistics company Exel plc, which had just acquired Tibbett & Britten Group. On 14 December 2005, Deutsche Post announced the completion of the acquisition of Exel. DHL integrated Exel into its logistics division, rebranding the division's services as DHL Exel Supply Chain. Following that acquisition, DHL had a global workforce of 285,000 people (500,000 people including DPWN and other sister companies) and roughly $65 billion in annual sales.

In 2006, DHL won a ten-year contract worth £1.6 billion to run the NHS Supply Chain, part of the United Kingdom's National Health Service. Under the contract, DHL was responsible for providing logistics services for over 500,000 products to support 600 hospitals and other health providers in the UK.

In a 50/50 joint venture with Lufthansa Cargo, DHL Express co-founded a new cargo airline, AeroLogic, in 2007, based at Leipzig/Halle Airport. The carrier operated up to 11 Boeing 777F planes by 2012. In December 2007, DHL became the first carrier to transport cargo via wind-powered ships, flying MS Beluga Skysails kites.

As part of the NHS contract, DHL opened a new 250,000 sq ft (23,000 m^{2}) distribution centre in 2008 to act as a stock-holding hub for food and other products, with another distribution centre planned for opening in 2012. The two new distribution centres created about 1,000 new jobs.

In May 2008, DHL Aviation moved its European hub from Brussels Airport to Leipzig/Halle, leading to a significant increase in cargo traffic at the airport. In the same month, DHL Express announced restructuring plans for its United States network, including termination of its business relationship with ABX Air and a new contract with competitor UPS for air freight operations. Its cargo hub was also shifted from Wilmington to Louisville. The Air Line Pilots Association, International protested, but on 10 November 2008, DHL announced that it was cutting 9,500 jobs as it discontinued domestic air and ground operations within the United States due to economic uncertainty. However, it retained international services and was still in talks with UPS to transport DHL packages between U.S. airports.

In October 2008, two DHL Express Middle East senior executives, David Giles and Jason Bresler, were assassinated in Kabul by one of their own Afghan employees; they received military honors from the U.S. military, the first of such kind in Afghanistan.

DHL ended domestic pickup and delivery service in the United States in 2009, effectively leaving UPS and FedEx as the two major express parcel delivery companies in the US. Limited domestic service was still available from DHL, with the packages tendered to USPS for local delivery. In April 2009, UPS announced that DHL and UPS had terminated negotiations without an agreement for UPS to provide airlift for DHL packages between airports in North America. DHL said in a statement, "We have not been able to come to a conclusive agreement that is acceptable to both parties." DHL continued to use its current air cargo providers, ASTAR Air Cargo and ABX Air.

=== 2011–present ===
The company sold its UK B2B and B2C domestic parcel operations in 2010 to British delivery company Home Delivery Network, since renamed Yodel.

In 2013, the company opened a newly expanded and upgraded global hub at the Cincinnati/Northern Kentucky International Airport in Hebron, Kentucky. On 1 November 2013, it sold its UK domestic same-day operations to British courier Rico Logistics but continued to offer time and day definite domestic services as well as international services in the UK.

In late 2020, DHL entered agreements to deliver the COVID-19 vaccine manufactured by BioNTech and Pfizer.

In March 2021, DHL Aviation announced the relocation of hub operations from Bergamo to Milan Malpensa Airport where DHL opened new logistics facilities.

In October 2021, DHL said that it would raise its rates for customers in the United States by an average of 5.9 percent, starting on 1 January 2022.

In March 2025, it acquired Packfleet, a UK-based, carbon-neutral parcel courier headquartered in London, England. Packfleet was launched as an alternative to traditional parcel couriers like DPD and Evri, combining an all-electric delivery fleet with a purpose-built technology platform.

In April 2025, DHL Express announced it would be suspending all consumer deliveries to the US, worth more than $800, due to new US customs rules. All business-to-business shipments would continue but may face delays.

In May 2025, DHL announced that its UK parcel delivery business was set merge with Evri to create a combined courier firm. Evri said the deal will also expand its international delivery capacity by giving it access to DHL's global network. DHL's e-commerce business will be renamed "Evri Premium – a network of DHL eCommerce".

In December 2025, DHL tracking scams surged by 206%. In the same month, DHL Global Forwarding became the latest CMA CGM customer to sign a biofuel with the French carrier. This agreement is for the joint use of 8990 metric tons of recycled waste cooking oil.

== Services ==
DHL Express's global headquarters are part of the Deutsche Post headquarters in Bonn. Headquarters for North America are located in Guadalajara, Mexico, and Plantation, Florida, while its Asia–Pacific and emerging markets headquarters are located in Singapore, Malaysia, Hong Kong, and mainland China. The European hub is in Leipzig, Germany. Most of DHL Express's business is incorporated as DHL International GmbH. DHL's Caribbean service is centred around the markets of: the Bahamas, Barbados, Bermuda, the British Virgin Islands, the Cayman Islands, Curaçao, the Dominican Republic, French Guiana, Guadeloupe, Haiti, Jamaica, Martinique, Sint Maarten, and Trinidad & Tobago. Therein a partnership for strategic express mail agreement has been according with national-owned postal agency of Barbados (the Barbados Postal Service).

Major competitors include FedEx, UPS, and national post carriers such as United States Postal Service (USPS) and Royal Mail. However, DHL has a minor partnership with the USPS, which allows DHL to deliver small packages to the recipient through the USPS network known as DHL Global Mail, now known as DHL eCommerce. It is also the sole provider for transferring USPS mail in and out of Iraq and Afghanistan.

DHL offers worldwide services, including deliveries to countries such as Iraq, Afghanistan and Myanmar (formerly Burma). As it is German-owned, DHL is not affected by U.S. embargoes or sanctions and will ship to Cuba and North Korea. However, there are strict codes for delivering to North Korea, as the country has shaky relations with the West.

== Environmental record ==
As of 2007, DHL took measures to control their environmental footprint by the use of alternative fuel vehicles. DHL changed vehicles in certain delivery fleets in order to use alternative fuels. Certain new vehicles used compressed natural gas.

=== Use of electric vehicles ===
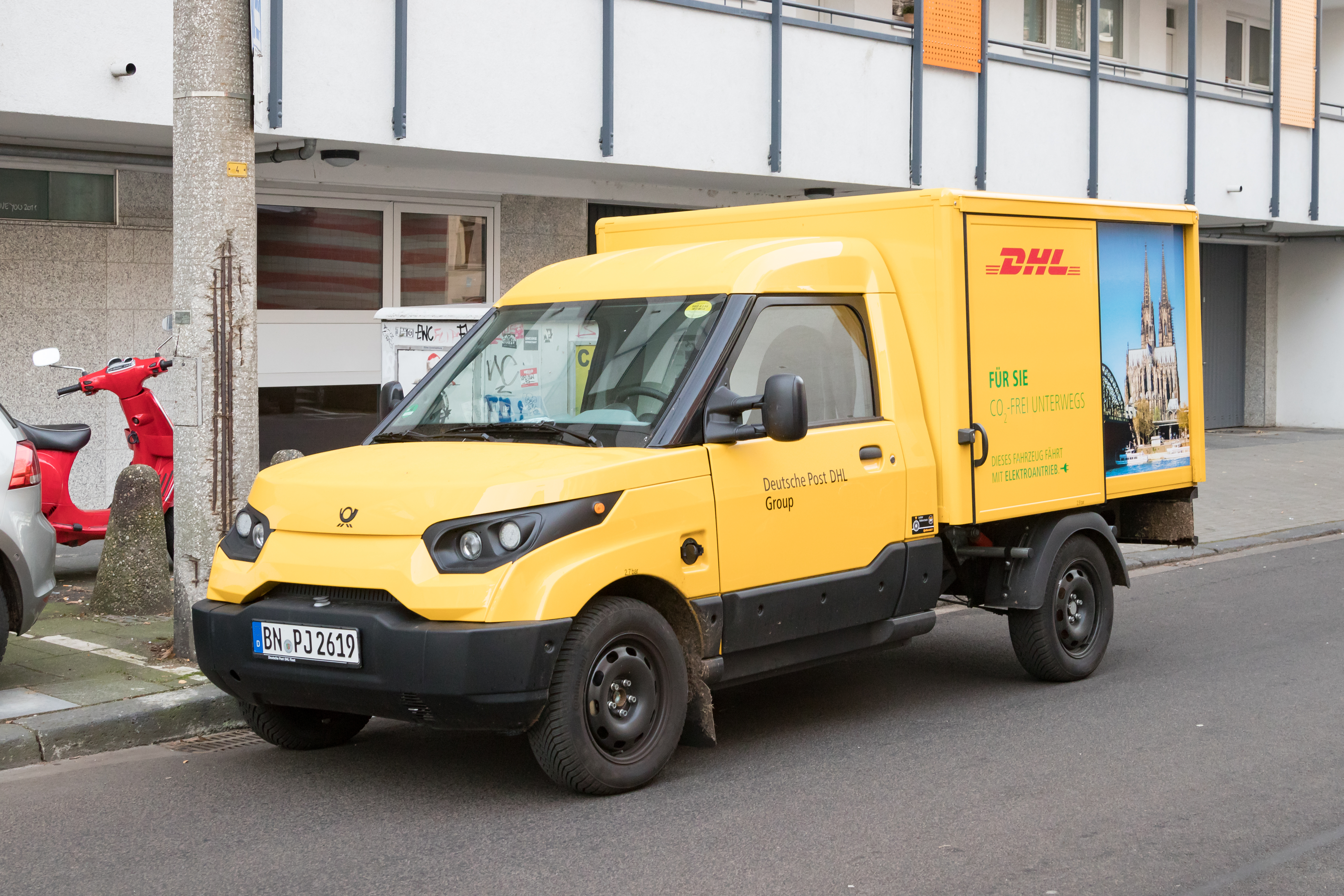
DHL StreetScooter in Germany

In December 2014, Deutsche Post DHL purchased the StreetScooter company, a small manufacturer of electric vehicles as part of its long-term goal to reach zero emissions in its delivery operations. By year end 2016, some 2,000 vehicles had been produced.

In 2016, BYD supplied DHL with electric distribution fleet of commercial BYD T3, which was used for daily logistics in the Central Business District (CBD) of Shenzhen and surrounding areas.

As of 2016, electric vans with a much greater range were to be required to achieve the long-term goal of replacing the entire Deutsche Post and DHL Express fleet of approximately 70,000 vehicles with StreetScooter models.

In 2022, DHL equipped 67 trucks in the US with TRAILAR solar mats, which power lift gates and other equipment for fuel savings.

As of 2017 the Deutsche Post/DHL GoGreen program planned to reduce emissions of greenhouse gases and local air pollutants; The long-term goal, summarized by Frank Appel, chief executive officer, was more aggressive. "From now until 2050, our mission will be to drive our business toward zero [logistics related] emissions. We are setting the standard for the future of the transport sector and doing our part to help the world community reach its goal of limiting global warming to less than two degrees Celsius."

== Finances ==
The DHL Express financial results are published in the Deutsche Post AG annual report. In 2016, this division's revenue increased by 2.7% to €14 billion. The earnings before interest and taxes (EBIT) increased by 11.3% over 2015 to €1.5 billion.

Recent Financial Data Quarter Ending 30 September 2024: Revenue: $23.446 billion (6.9% increase year-over-year). Twelve Months Ending 30 September 2024: Revenue: $92.791 billion (0.25% decline year-over-year). Annual Revenue for 2023: Revenue: $91.503 billion (10.8% decline from 2022). Annual Revenue for 2022: Revenue: $102.58 billion (3.17% increase from 2021). Annual Revenue for 2021: Revenue: $99.425 billion (26.33% increase from 2020).

== DHL Aviation ==
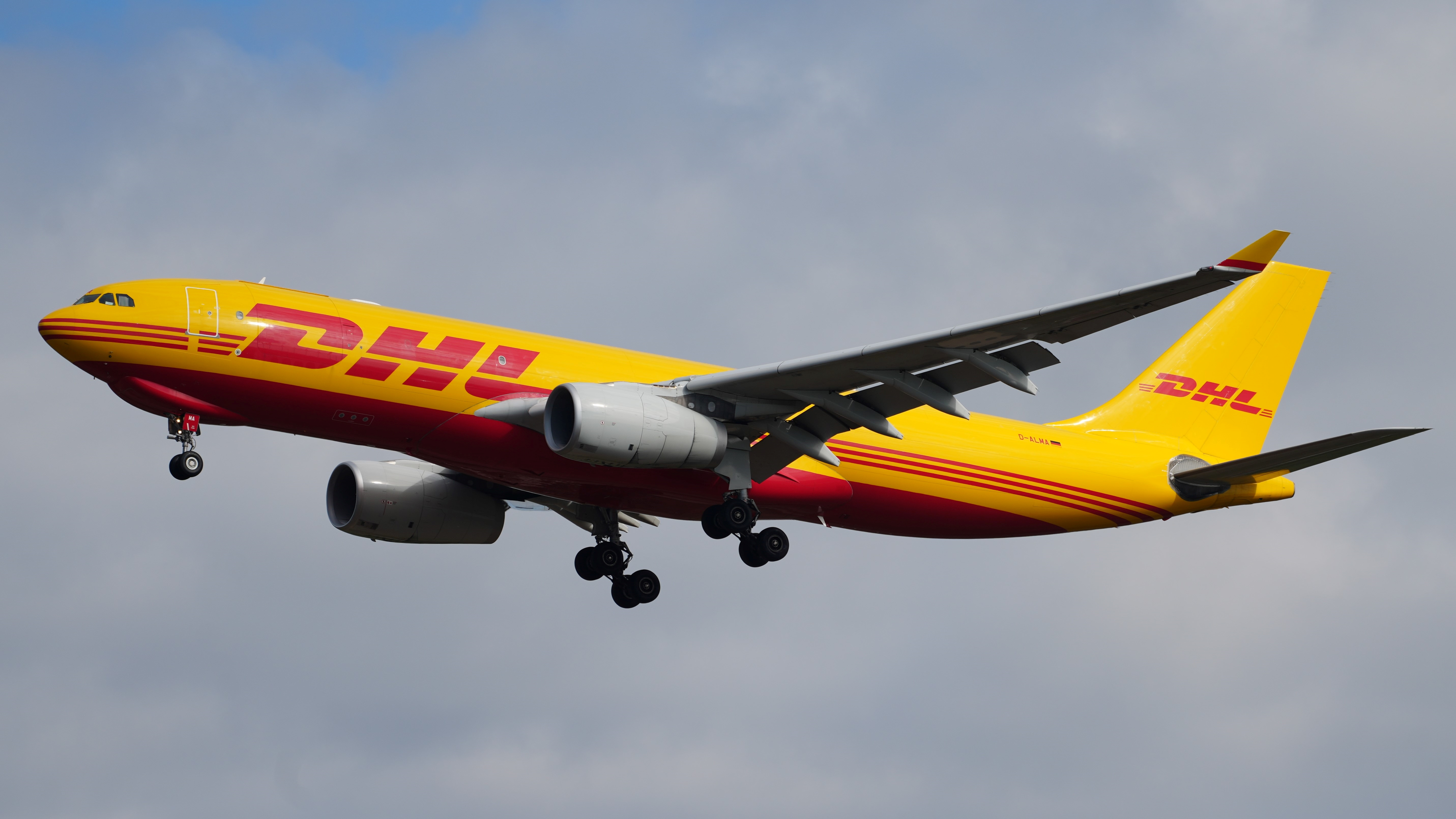
An Airbus A330-200F operated by European Air Transport Leipzig as part of DHL Aviation

Deutsche Post owns five airline subsidiaries operating for DHL Express, operating approx. 250 aircraft and another 21 aircraft on order, which are collectively referred to as DHL Aviation. DHL Express is an equal partner in a sixth airline that operates for DHL Express:

- Blue Dart Aviation, Chennai, India, provides services for Indian destinations from Chennai International Airport
- DHL Aero Expreso, Panama City, Panama provides cargo services for destinations in Central and South America
- DHL Air UK, Hounslow, United Kingdom provides services for European destinations from East Midlands Airport
- European Air Transport Leipzig, Leipzig, Germany provides services for European destinations from Leipzig/Halle Airport
- AeroLogic (joint venture with Lufthansa), Schkeuditz, Germany provides services from Europe to central and eastern Asian destinations from Leipzig/Halle Airport and Frankfurt Airport
- SNAS/DHL, Bahrain provides services for Middle East destinations from Bahrain International Airport

== Sponsorships ==
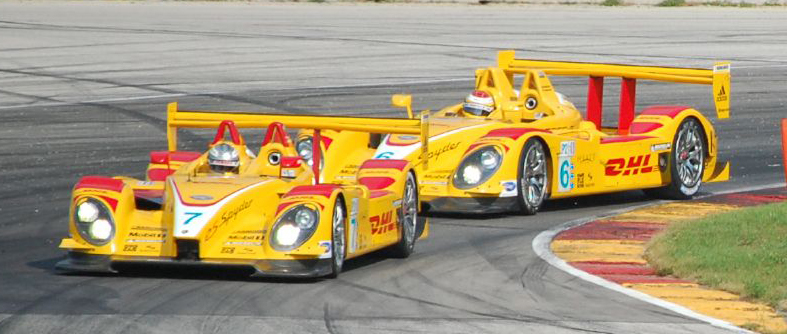
DHL-colored Team Penske Porsche RS Spyder LMP2 racing cars of Penske Racing

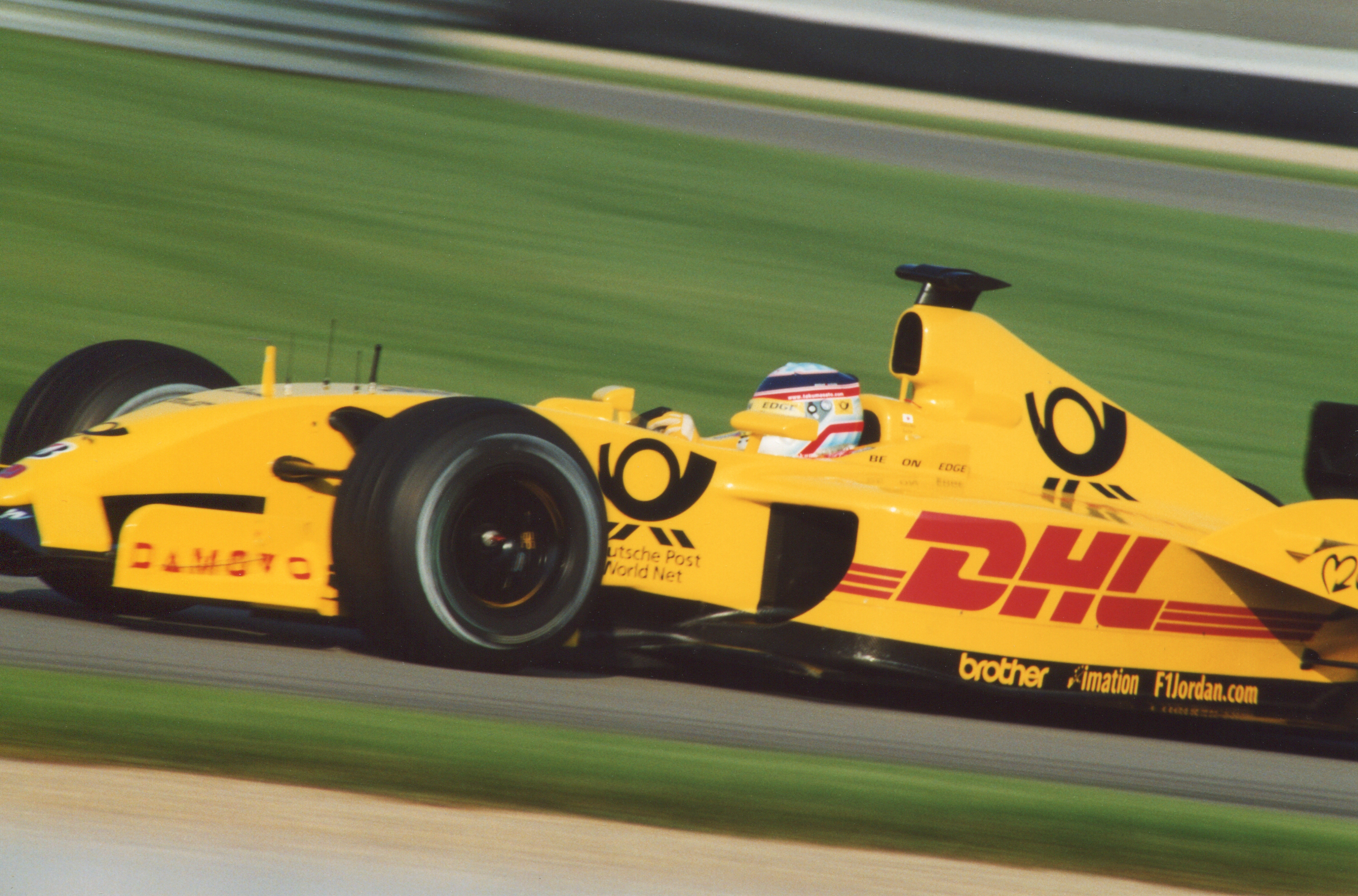
A Jordan Grand Prix Formula One car with a DHL paint scheme at the US Grand Prix at the Indianapolis track

For several years, DHL was the primary sponsor of the Penske Racing Porsche RS Spyder Le Mans Prototypes in the International Motor Sports Association American Le Mans Series. DHL have also sponsored Ryan Hunter-Reay's #28 IndyCar Series car for Andretti Autosport since 2011. They moved to Romain Grosjean in 2022 and then to Álex Palou and Chip Ganassi Racing in 2024. With DHL, Hunter-Reay won the championship for the 2012 IndyCar Series season as well as the 2014 Indianapolis 500. DHL was the main title sponsor of the Jordan Formula One team during 2002. Since then, DHL has become a regular track-side sponsor at various Formula One races throughout each year, as well as becoming the 'Official Logistics Partner' of the category. Since 2007, they have also sponsored the DHL Fastest Lap Award for the driver that achieves the fastest laps in a season.

Manchester United Football Club announced them as their first training kit sponsor in August 2011, agreeing to a four-year deal with DHL reported to be worth £40 million; it is believed to be the first instance of training kit sponsorship in English football. In 2014, FC Bayern Munich agreed to a six-year sponsorship deal with DHL. In 2012, the company became the main sponsor of League of Ireland club Bohemian F.C.

In 2011, DHL became the title sponsor of the South African Western Cape Rugby Union teams Western Province and the Stormers. This came into effect on 1 January 2011 for a period of three years. DHL were still the current sponsor for both teams as of the 2025–2026 season.

For the 2011–12 Volvo Ocean Race DHL was one of four race partners providing logistics for this event.

In 2014, the company sponsored, with IMG Fashion, DHL Exported, which was aimed at "assisting designers who are already successful locally to gain momentum internationally". DHL Exported will "sponsor a chosen designer for two consecutive seasons at" the Mercedes-Benz Fashion Week in New York, London Fashion Week, Milan Fashion Week or Mercedes-Benz Fashion Week Tokyo. IMG Fashion "will accept applications from February 17 through April 2 at dhlexported.com".

Expanding its support to various cultural endeavours, in 2014 DHL signed on as the official logistics partner for Cirque du Soleil. DHL transports up to 2,000 tonnes and 80 freight containers utilizing air, sea, and land to transport the equipment from one city to the next.

In 2015, DHL became the main sponsor of Italian volleyball club Modena Volley, covering the whole men's SuperLega Italian championship and the CEV Champions League.

DHL is a major sponsor of Surf Life Saving Australia.

DHL Express, also came on board for the five times Indian Premier League (IPL) champions Mumbai Indians as a Principal Sponsor and Official Logistics Partner in 2021.

In 2020 DHL collaborated with Veldskoen Shoes, a South African shoe company to launch a limited edition sneaker in London called "Dear Everyone".

== See also ==
- DHL Balloon
- DHL Fastest Lap Award
- Major League Baseball Delivery Man of the Year Award
- Wilmington, Ohio
