= DHL Global Forwarding =

Division of Deutsche Post DHL

- Type: Division
- Industry: freight forwarding
- Founded: 1815 (as Danzas); 2006 as DHL Global Forwarding
- Headquarters: Bonn, Germany
- Owner: DHL Group
- Parent: DHL Freight/Forwarding
- Website: www.dhl.com

Old logo.

DHL Global Forwarding, formerly known as DHL Danzas Air & Ocean, is a division of Deutsche Post DHL providing air and ocean freight forwarding services. It also plans and undertakes major logistics projects under the brand name DHL Industrial Projects. Together with DHL Freight, it forms Deutsche Post's Freight/Forwarding department.

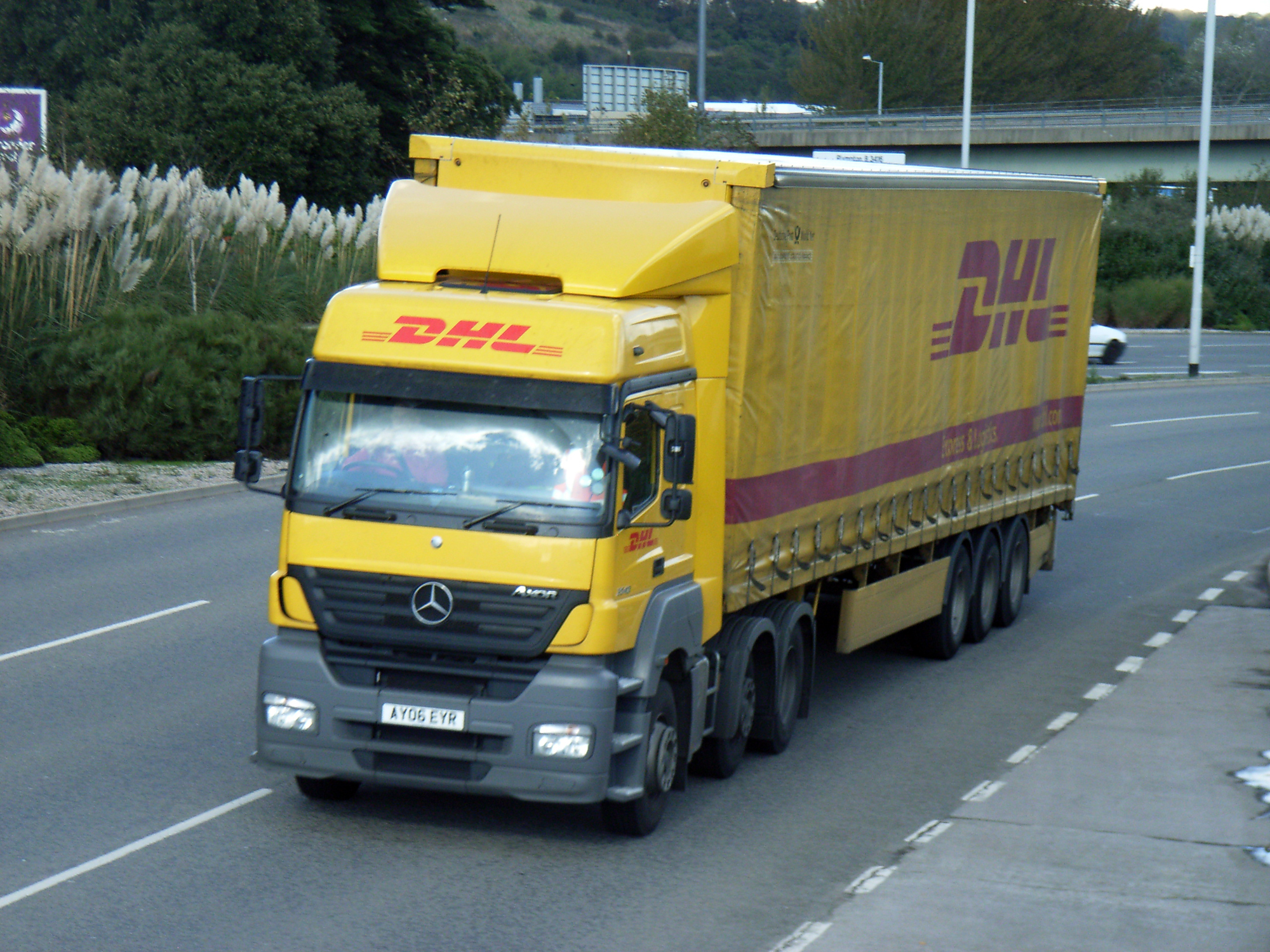
DHL semitrailer truck.

The Forwarding division carries goods by rail, road, air and sea under the DHL brand and includes the DHL Freight operation which runs a ground-based freight network covering Europe, Russia and traffic into the Middle East. In 2016, this division's revenue declined by 7.7 percent to €13.7 billion, but earnings before interest and taxes (EBIT) improved from -€181 million in 2015 to +€287 million.

== History ==
Danzas was founded in 1815 and was originally based in Saint-Louis, Alsace, France.

Louis Danzas fought at Waterloo for Napoleon. After that battle, he joined a transport company owned by Michel l'Eveque and by 1840 became joint owner. The company, Danzas, and l'Eveque, obtained a mail delivery franchise from Le Havre to New York City in 1846. A Basel branch was opened in 1854.

The company began to use air transport in 1920 between France, and England, and opened its own freight terminal in Paris in 1962.

In 1999, Deutsche Post World Net acquired Danzas. When Deutsche Post AG acquired 100% of DHL in 2002, it fully integrated Danzas, DHL and EuroExpress under the DHL brand, thus renaming Danzas to DHL Danzas Air & Ocean.

In 2005, Deutsche Post dropped the Danzas brand and renamed the business unit DHL Global Forwarding/DHL Freight.

In 2006, it also combined parts of Danzas and other ground-based freight subsidiaries in its Global Forwarding, Freight division.
