= Robert Lynn (businessman) =

American businessman, co-founder of DHL (1920–1998)

- Born: August 11, 1920; Vidin, Bulgaria
- Died: February 8, 1998 (aged 77); Seattle, Washington
- Known for: Co-founder of DHL

Robert Lynn (August 11, 1920 – February 8, 1998) was an American businessman best known for co-founding DHL alongside Adrian Dalsey and Larry Hillblom. He was the “L” in DHL, and the last of the three founders to die.

He was born in Vidin, raised in Vienna, and emigrated to the United States in 1939, and lived most of his life in the United States.

In 2000, Lynn was posthumously inducted into the International Air Cargo Association Hall of Fame.
