= Jim Monkmeyer =

President of Transportation at DHL Supply Chain

Jim Monkmeyer is the President of Transportation at DHL Supply Chain. He was appointed in 2016.

== Education ==
Monkmeyer graduated from the University of Wisconsin–Madison with a Bachelor of Science degree in Civil and Environmental Engineering. He subsequently received a Master of Science in Transportation degree from Northwestern University's Transportation Center.
