= John Dasburg =

American businessperson

- Born: 1943 (age 82–83); Queens, New York
- Education: University of Florida
- Known for: Being the CEO of Northwest Airlines and Burger King

John H. Dasburg (born 1943 in Queens, New York) is an American businessperson and the former chief executive officer (CEO) of Northwest Airlines from 1990 to 2001 and of Burger King from 2001 to 2002. Dasburg grew up in Miami, Florida and graduated from Miami High School. He served in the United States Navy during the Vietnam War. He attended the University of Florida for his bachelor's degree in engineering and law degree, and used the GI Bill to get his MBA also from UF. He was one of the youngest name partners at Peat, Marwick Mitchell accounting firm, and went on to become one of the senior members of the executive team at Marriott. He later accepted a position with Northwest Airlines, and became the CEO in 1990. He is credited with saving the airline from bankruptcy in the early 1990s. He served as chairman, CEO, and president of Burger King and chairman and CEO of DHL Airways. He is currently chairman and CEO of Astar Air Cargo, Inc.

He won the Horatio Alger Award. In addition, he served on the University of Florida Board of Trustees.

His oldest child, Meredith, was killed in a van accident in 1988 in Potomac, Maryland when she was six years old. He also has a son and another daughter with his spouse, lawyer Mary Lou Dasburg, née Diez.
