= Danzas =

Swiss transport company

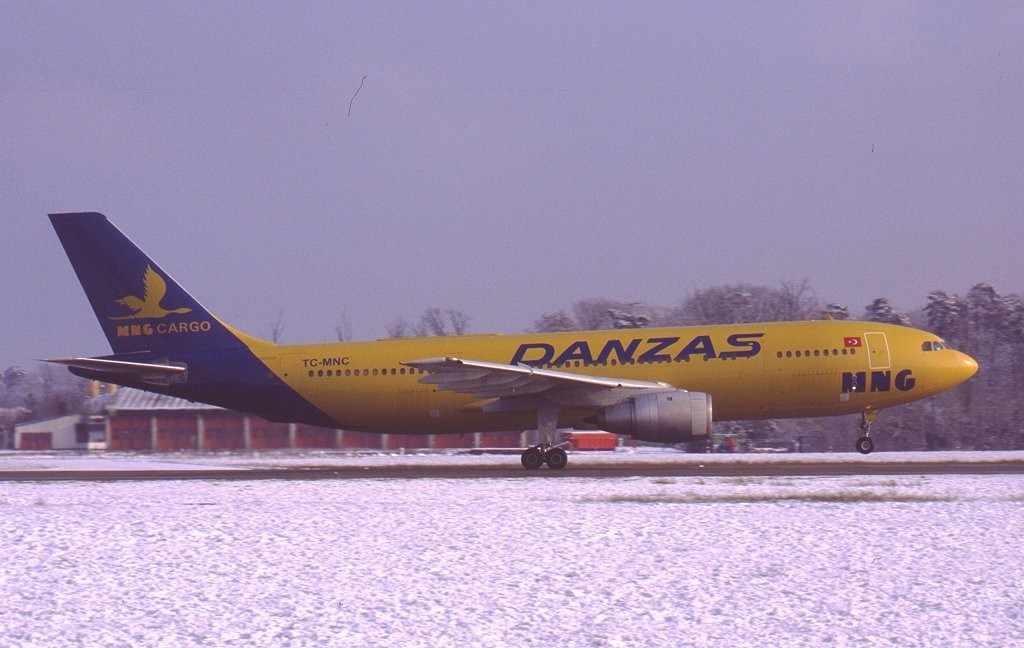
- Type: Public company
- Industry: Freight transport
- Founded: 1806
- Fate: Acquired by Deutsche Post (1999)
- Successor: DHL Global Forwarding
- Headquarters: Basel, Switzerland
- Key people: Louis Danzas (1788–1862); Emile Jules Danzas (1836–1917); Laurent Werzinger; Albert Werzinger
- Products: Logistics, freight forwarding

Danzas was an international transport company with headquarters in Basel, Switzerland. Founded in 1806 in Saint-Louis (Alsace) and named after Louis Danzas (1788–1862) when he took over the company in 1840, the firm became a major player in international freight and logistics until its acquisition by Deutsche Post in 1999 (now known as DHL Global Forwarding).

== History ==
=== Early years and establishment ===
The company was founded in 1806 in Saint-Louis, Alsace. By the time Louis Danzas (1788–1862) took over the business in 1840 and gave it his name, the company was already conducting overseas transport operations, serving as the official agent for the Le Havre-New York postal company.

=== International expansion ===
International growth and the transfer of headquarters to Basel occurred after the Franco-Prussian War of 1870–1871, under Emile Jules Danzas (1836–1917), son of Louis. The company experienced strong growth until World War I and established itself in the Swiss market, opening a Zürich branch in 1872 and securing major contracts with the textile industry. The business was restructured as a limited partnership in 1878, then as a joint-stock company in 1903. The company specialized particularly in shipping parcels to departure ports for transatlantic vessels.

In 1886, the family dynasty ended with the takeover by Laurent Werzinger, a long-time authorized signatory and partner, who was succeeded by his son Albert. Danzas GmbH was founded in Germany in 1919. At the same time, a travel and emigration agency opened. After World War II, subsidiaries were established in France and Italy.

=== Reorganization and specialization ===
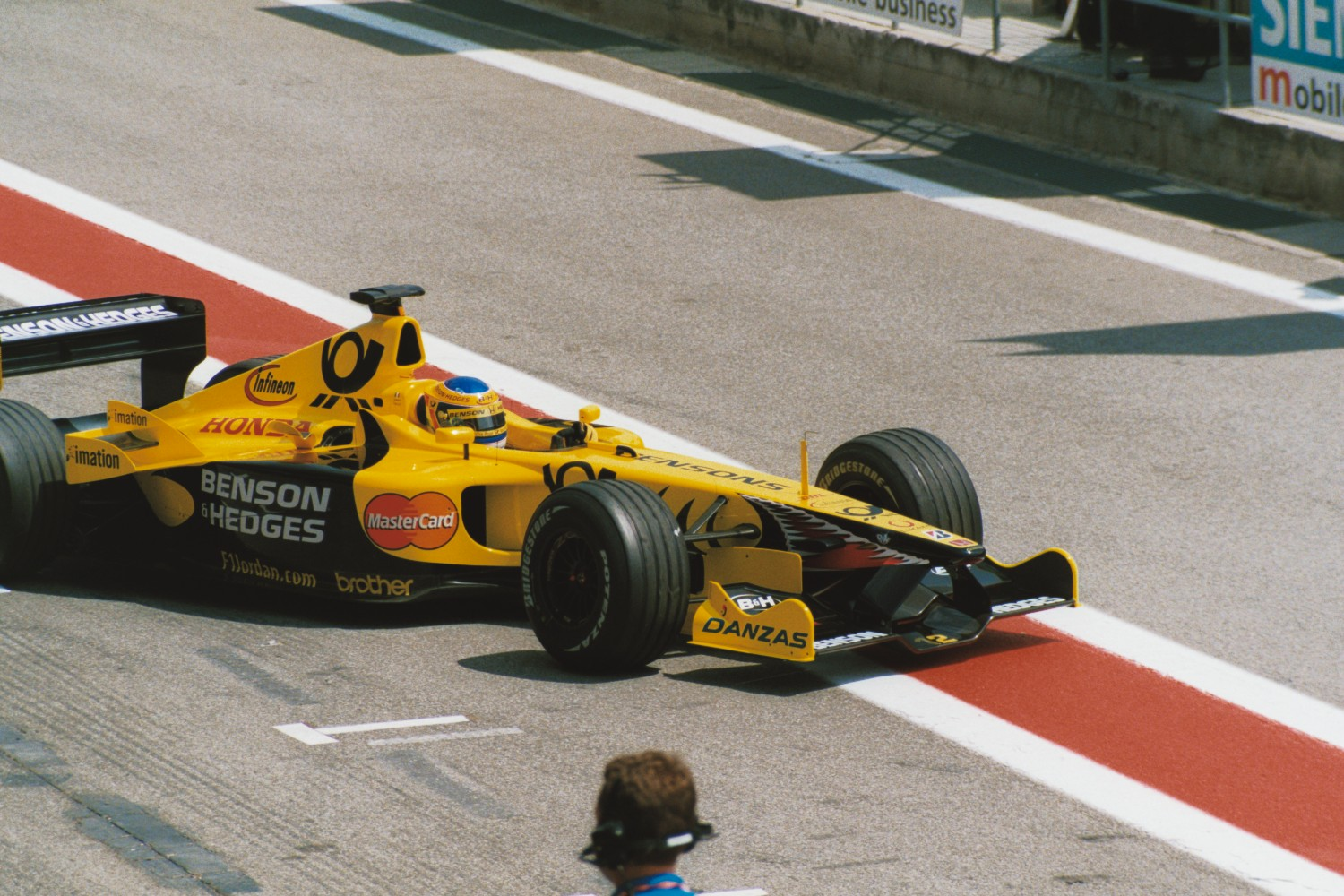
Danzas sponsorship on the 2001 Jordan Honda EJ11

According to the Danzas executive Ralph Weil, in 1961, the global group reorganized, specializing in customs clearance in Europe. When customs barriers were removed in the European Union in 1993, the company experienced a sharp decline in gross turnover (10.2 billion Swiss francs in 1992, 6.7 billion in 1993) and profit (20 million in 1992, 12 million in 1993). To address structural problems that emerged in the 1990s—strong orientation toward Europe, specialization in individual parcel traffic, and high infrastructure costs—Danzas refocused on logistics, reduced transport conducted under its own name, and sold its travel agency in 1995 (which accounted for 10% of total turnover in 1994). In 1998, the company had 16,000 employees and a turnover in excess of 7 billion SFr.

In 1999 Danzas was acquired by Deutsche Post. Following the takeover, Deutsche Post began acquiring companies to build into the Danzas portfolio including Meadowsfreight from DFDS, Air Express International and Finnish postal company Kelpo Kuljetus Fi Oy. Danzas also entered into a joint venture with Doal S.S. de C.V. to expand their footprint in Mexico. The Danzas brand was featured as a sponsor of the Jordan Grand Prix Formula One team, as part of Deutsche Post's sponsorship.

In 2002, Deutsche Post integrated Danzas into newly acquired DHL. Only certain specialist parts of the organisation retained the Danzas branding. The final off-shoot of the original company Danzas AEI Emirates, was acquired by DHL Global Forwarding in 2024.

== Bibliography ==
- Hundertfünfzig Jahre Danzas, 1965
- M. Furler, Dienstleistungsunternehmen: Danzas, Surveillance, Adia, 1988
