= Exel =

Logistics company

DHL Supply Chain – North America
- Type: Subsidiary
- Industry: Logistics
- Founded: Westerville, Ohio (1992)
- Defunct: January 2016
- Headquarters: Westerville, OH; United States
- Key people: Scott Sureddin, CEO
- Parent: Deutsche Post
- Website: dhl-usa.com/supplychain

Exel was a supply chain and logistics company operating in North America and Europe, which became a subsidiary of the German firm Deutsche Post in 2005. It reported annual revenues of about $4.2 billion in February 2012.

== History ==
The company has its origins in several independent warehouse and transportation management companies in the United States which were acquired in 1985 by NFC plc (formerly the National Freight Corporation, the nationalised transportation business in the United Kingdom created by the post war Labour government).

The new company was re-branded Exel and the Americas headquarters was established in Westerville, Ohio, in 1992. By the year 2000, Exel had grown and expanded operations to include Canada, Latin America and South America. Its portfolio of services also grew to include transportation management, freight consolidation, contract packaging, contract manufacturing, demand planning and other supply chain services.

In May 2000, NFC plc merged with Ocean Group plc and, adopting the name of its American subsidiary, became Exel plc. In August 2004, Exel plc acquired Tibbett & Britten, a leading contract logistics business based in the United Kingdom, for $710m. On 14 December 2005, Deutsche Post announced the completion of the acquisition of Exel plc.

In January 2016, Exel (North America) changed its name to DHL Supply Chain: North America.

== Operations ==
Deutsche Post continues to trade under the Exel brand in North America. The rest of the business was merged with DHL Express to form DHL Exel Supply Chain. Exel operates 441 facilities and works with over 40,000 associates in North America. Exel serves the automotive, chemical, consumer, energy, industrial, life sciences, retail, and technology industries.

Services include supply chain management, inbound to manufacturing, in plant services, manufacturing, assembly and packing, warehousing and order fulfilment, transportation management, home and business delivery and reverse logistics.

== Controversies ==
In August 2011, the main distribution center for Hershey candies was subjected to a strike by about 400 young foreign workers brought to the United States under the J1 "cultural exchange" visa program. The center in Palmyra, Pennsylvania was run for Hershey by Exel. Exel in turn subcontracted the staffing of the center to another firm, SHS OnSite Solutions, based in Lemoyne, Pennsylvania. The students were recruited by yet another organization called the Council on Educational Travel (CETUSA).

In February 2012, the Department of Labor's Occupational Safety and Health Administration fined Exel almost $300,000 for wilfully failing to record and report on-the-job injuries for four years.

In 2011, the U.S. Equal Employment Opportunity Commission, on behalf of Contrice Travis, sued Exel for sexual discrimination alleging that Exel failed to promote a female associate to a supervisory position. In July 2013, during a four-day trial in Atlanta, the jury heard evidence that included "Travis's former supervisor testified that when he recommended Travis for the position, the general manager informed him that he would never put a woman in that position." The jury found the charges to be true, and awarded Travis $25,000 in compensatory damages and $475,000 in punitive damages plus back pay.
