= Adrian Dalsey =

American businessman

- Born: October 14, 1914; Illinois, US
- Died: October 10, 1994 (aged 79); Walnut Creek, California, US
- Known for: Co-founder of DHL
- Spouse: Anne
- Children: 3

Adrian Dalsey (October 14, 1914 – October 10, 1994) was a co-founder of shipping company, DHL Express.

== Early life ==
Dalsey was born in Illinois on October 14, 1914. He attended Wheaton College there, but later dropped out.

== DHL ==
In 1969, he co-founded DHL Express alongside business partners Larry Hillblom and Robert Lynn. Dalsey was the "D" in DHL. He traveled to southeast Asia, Micronesia, Hawaii, Guam, and other various parts of Asia, until he sold his share of DHL in 1980. DHL has subsequently become a global leader in logistics.

== Family ==
He married Marjorie Schutt Dalsey and they had two children together, a boy named Jonathan and daughter Jennifer. He also fathered another son, Harry Dalsey after divorcing his wife Marjorie.

== Walnut Creek slaying ==
His son Harry admitted to killing Guy Broomfield, partner of his mother and brother of actress Shirley Anne Field, in 1999, and plea bargained it down to manslaughter.

== Death ==
Adrian Dalsey married Harry's mother Annie, and they were together until he died in 1994, in Walnut Creek, California.

== Honors ==
In 2000, Dalsey was posthumously inducted into the International Air Cargo Association Hall of Fame.
