= Larry Hillblom =

American businessman (1943–1995)

- Born: Larry Lee Hillblom; May 12, 1943; Kingsburg, California, U.S.
- Disappeared: May 21, 1995 (aged 52); Northern Mariana Islands
- Known for: Co-founding of DHL
- Children: 4

Larry Lee Hillblom (May 12, 1943 – May 21, 1995) was an American businessman and, alongside Adrian Dalsey and Robert Lynn, co-founded the shipping company DHL. After his disappearance in 1995, his estate paid $360 million to four impoverished children whom he had fathered as a result of "sex safari" trips in Southeast Asian countries, where he allegedly had sex with teenaged virgins.

== Early life and education ==
Larry Hillblom was born on May 12, 1943, and raised in Kingsburg, California. During his youth, he went to the Concordia Lutheran Church and attended Kingsburg High School. He attended Reedley College and Fresno State, eventually earning a law degree at the University of California, Berkeley's Boalt Hall School of Law and briefly clerked for San Francisco based attorney Melvin Belli.

== Company history ==
In December 1969, Matson Navigation Co. introduced new container ships (Hawaiian Enterprise Class) into its Hawaii cargo service. They were considerably faster than the older ships they replaced, and they saved several days off the crossing time from the US west coast to Hawaii. But with these faster vessels, the shipping documents could not be delivered by U.S. Postal Service to their Hawaii customers before the arrival of the goods.

Hillblom approached Matson and told them that he could get their documents delivered in time. He did so by purchasing tickets for airline passengers who could take 350 pounds (160 kg) of accompanied baggage, and sending the Matson shipping documents with them. Other Hawaii companies with time-sensitive documents learned about and started to use the service.

In 1969 Hillblom co-founded DHL; the company was later transformed into a general air courier, and Hillblom's wealth expanded to several billion dollars. In the 1980s he moved to Saipan, Commonwealth of the Northern Mariana Islands (CNMI) where he started several businesses and development projects in Hawaii, Vietnam, and the Philippines.

== Life in Asia ==
In Vietnam, he spent US$40 million to restore the Dalat Palace Hotel and its golf course. Other investments included the Novotel Dalat, Novotel Phan Thiet, Ocean Dunes Golf Course, and the Riverside Apartments outside Ho Chi Minh City. The investment was made via an overseas holding company to avoid an American embargo against Vietnam. The Dalat Palace Hotel opened in 1995 under Hillblom's and his Vietnamese partners' ownership with management personnel provided by Accor.

== 1993 plane crash ==
In 1993, while flying his vintage plane near Saipan, Hillblom's plane crashed. Due to his serious injuries, he had facial reconstructive surgery.

== Disappearance ==
Hillblom was an aircraft enthusiast and owned a number of vintage planes. His seaplane crashed on May 21, 1995, on a flight from Pagan Island to Saipan. The bodies of the pilot, Robert Long, and a business partner were found, but Hillblom's body was never recovered. Around a quarter of the plane was recovered.

== Paternity controversy ==
Hillblom's will stated that the University of California, San Francisco (UCSF), would receive his estate, and did not specify any children in the 1982 will. There was no "disinheritance clause" in the will, which caused controversy. After his death, Hillblom's estate was the subject of lawsuits from children fathered across the Pacific. Under CNMI law, illegitimate children born after a will has been drawn up are entitled to make a claim on the estate.

Many women from several Southeast Asian and Oceanic countries claimed he had fathered children with them. (Women who were under the age of consent at the time also claimed statutory rape.) Kaylani Kinney was the first to come forward, claiming to have given birth to a son named Larry Hillblom Jr. Co-counsel for Kinney, David J. Lujan (Guam; lead) and Barry Israel (Santa Barbara, California) filed the first claim against the Hillblom estate. Hillblom had resided in the CNMI, whose probate law recognises the first right of all children to a share of their father's estate, notwithstanding any will to the contrary. But because Hillblom's body was not recovered in the crash, no DNA test could be performed to prove paternity. Mysteriously, his house in Saipan had been removed of any personal possessions and was discovered to have been wiped clean of any traces of his DNA. The sinks had been scrubbed with muriatic acid, and toothbrushes, combs, hairbrushes and clothes were found buried in the backyard, making them useless for DNA testing.

Investigators discovered he had had a facial mole removed at UCSF Medical Center, and it was still there; UCSF agreed to relinquish the mole (although its release could deprive UCSF of the estate if it could be used to prove Hillblom had sired children). It was later discovered, however, that the mole was not from Hillblom.

Hillblom's mother, brother and half-brother initially refused to submit their DNA, which could also have been used to determine paternity of the children. Lujan and co-counsel Israel then dispatched a team of investigators to compare the DNA of all the children suing for claim on Hillblom's estate. Lujan and Israel surmised that since the girls were located in different countries, if the children shared certain DNA markers, the only logical conclusion would be that they would almost certainly have the same father. In the end, a judge ordered Hillblom's brother and mother to submit to genetic testing. The tests confirmed that four of the eight claimants were Hillblom's children.

It was ultimately determined that a Vietnamese child, Lory Nguyen; Jellian Cuartero, 5 and Mercedita Feliciano, 4, of the Philippines; and Larry Hillblom Jr., of Palau, were fathered by Hillblom. In the final settlement, each of the four children received a gross payment of US$90 million, reduced to about US$50 million after taxes and fees, while the remaining US$240 million went to the Hillblom Foundation, which followed Hillblom's wishes and donated funds to UCSF, for medical research.

== Legacy ==
A film by Alexis Spraic documenting the controversy that took place after Hillblom's death, titled Shadow Billionaire, was first shown at the 2009 Tribeca Film Festival.

== See also ==
- List of people who disappeared mysteriously at sea
