= Tibbett and Britten =

Tibbet & Britten Group plc
- Founders: John Tibbett and Frank Britten
- Defunct: June 2004
- Fate: Absorbed into Exel
- Headquarters: UK
- Revenue: £1.63 billion (2003)
- Owners: John Harvey and David Michael Cass through Management Buyout (1984)
- Number of employees: 39000 (2003)

Tibbet & Britten Group plc was a logistics company based in the United Kingdom.

== History ==
The company's origins are traced to a transport division of Unilever which became independent through a management buyout in 1984. The company grew over the next two decades by acquisition and organic growth, including growth through expansion of contracts with existing large clients as their companies expanded; from 1986 to 2004, the company increased its revenue by ten.

== Operation ==
The company operated primarily in North America and Europe, as well as in other locations in Africa, Asia and South America.

The company provided warehousing, distribution, and supply chain management services, as well as operating rail terminals in the United Kingdom.

Materials transported by the firm included consumer and perishable goods.

In June 2004, the company was acquired by Exel for £328 million; a 36% premium on the share price.
