= DHL (disambiguation) =

DHL is a trademark for international courier, parcel, and express mail operation of Deutsche Post.

DHL may also refer to:

== Related businesses and subsidiaries ==
- Deutsche Post
- DHL Aviation
- DHL Air UK
- DHL de Guatemala
- DHL International Aviation ME
- DHL Aero Expreso
- DHL Ecuador
- DHL Global Forwarding
- DHL Freight
- DHL Supply Chain

== Other uses ==
- "DHL" (song), 2019 single by American singer Frank Ocean
- Doctor of Humane Letters
- Doctor of Hebrew Literature, see Jewish Theological Seminary of America
- D. H. Lawrence (1885–1930), English writer
