= DHL Ecuador =

Ecuadorian airline

Trans Am Aero Express del Ecuador

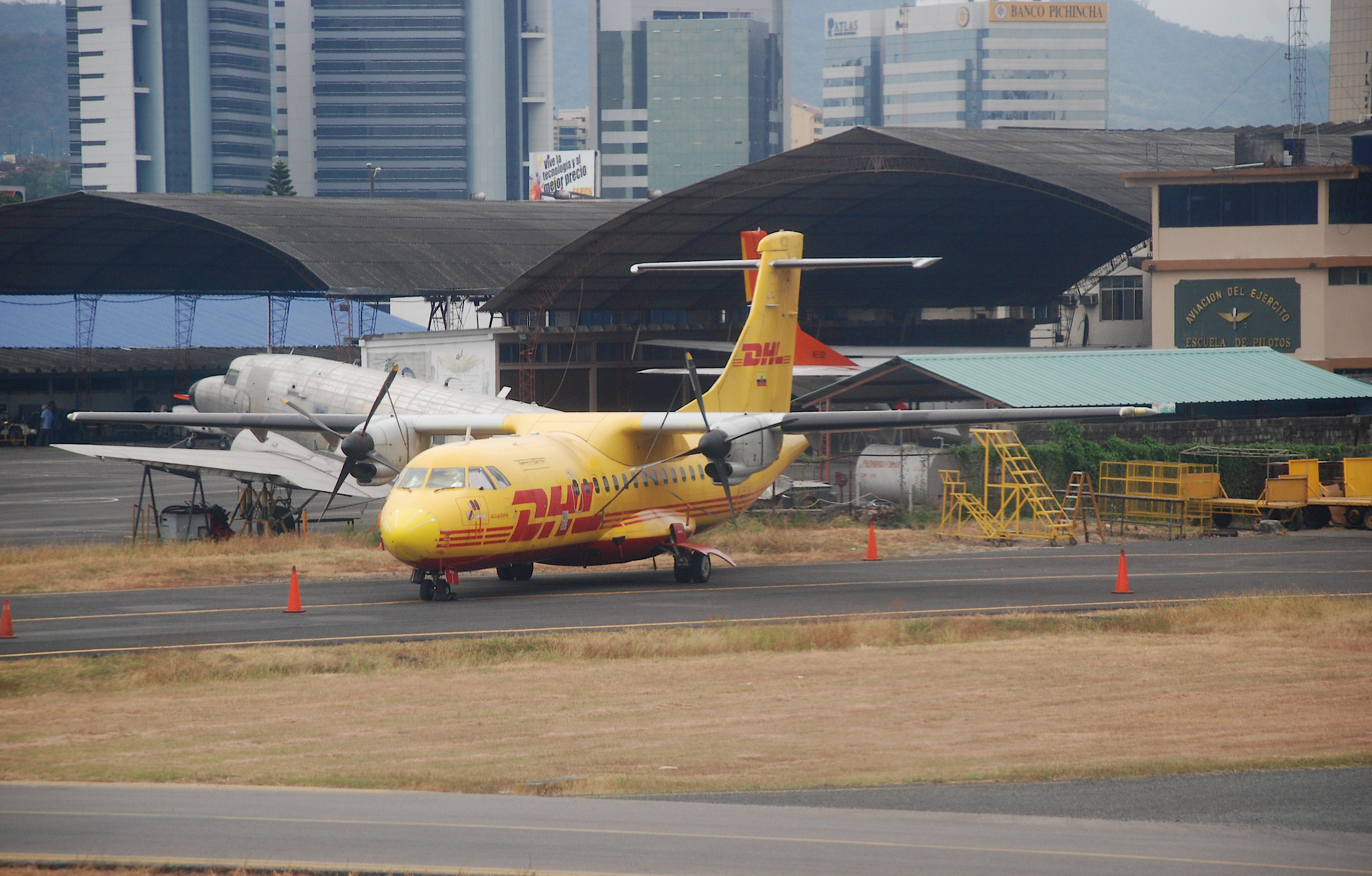
IATA	ICAO	Call sign
7T	RTM	AERO TRANSAM
- Founded: 1991
- Ceased operations: July 14, 2025
- Hubs: José Joaquín de Olmedo International Airport
- Destinations: 3
- Parent company: DHL Aviation
- Headquarters: Guayaquil, Ecuador
- Employees: 56 (2023)
- Website: www.dhl.com

DHL Ecuador (TransAm) Ltda. (officially Trans Am Aero Express del Ecuador) was a cargo airline based in Guayaquil and established in 1991. It was wholly owned by Deutsche Post and provided services for the group's DHL-branded logistics network in Ecuador. Its main base was José Joaquín de Olmedo International Airport. On July 14, 2025, the airline had abruptly suspended operations and was replaced by DHL Aero Expreso.

== See also ==
- DHL Aviation
- List of airlines of Ecuador
