= DHL Aviation =

Aviation division of DHL Express

IATA	ICAO	Call sign
Various	Various	Various
- Founded: 1969; 57 years ago
- Hubs: Bahrain; Brussels; Cincinnati; East Midlands; Hong Kong; Istanbul; Leipzig/Halle; London–Luton; Milan–Malpensa; Shanghai–Pudong
- Fleet size: 211
- Destinations: 225
- Parent company: DHL
- Headquarters: Bonn, North Rhine-Westphalia, Germany
- Website: aviationcargo.dhl.com

DHL Aviation is a division of logistics multinational DHL responsible for providing air transport capacity.

== Overview ==
DHL Aviation is a group of airlines that are either owned, co-owned or chartered by DHL Express. DHL owns six main airlines to service various global regions:

- European Air Transport Leipzig (EAT Leipzig) is responsible for the major part of the network for Europe, and for long-haul services to the Middle East and Africa. It operates a fleet of Boeing and Airbus freighters from its hub at the Leipzig/Halle Airport.
- DHL Air UK (DHL Air), acquired by DHL in 1989, is based at East Midlands Airport. Since July 2000, it has operated a fleet of Boeing 757 freighters on intra-European services and a fleet of Boeing 767 freighters, primarily on transatlantic routes.
- DHL Aero Expreso is a subsidiary in the Central and South America Hub in Tocumen, Panamá, operating a fleet of Boeing 737-400, 757-200 and 767-300 freighters which also serve destinations in the Caribbean and Florida.
- DHL International handles Middle East destinations from its headquarters and main regional hub at Bahrain International Airport, operating a fleet of Boeing 767 freighters. The fleet is deployed throughout the Middle East and in Africa.
- Blue Dart Aviation is based at Chennai International Airport, India, with a fleet of Boeing 757 freighters. It provides services for DHL's Indian network and regional charters.
- DHL Air Austria is based at Vienna International Airport, Austria, with a fleet of Boeing 757 freighters.

As of October 2025, DHL had stakes in the following airlines, some of which also operate under the DHL brand or livery:

- AeroLogic, Leipzig, Germany (50%)
- Tasman Cargo Airlines, Sydney, Australia (49%)

Former owned airlines:

- Air Hong Kong sold the remaining 40% shares to Cathay Pacific Airways in July 2017.
- Polar Air Cargo sold 49% stake to Atlas Air Worldwide Holdings in February 2025.

== Hubs ==
Brussels Airport was a main hub; when DHL planned expansion at Brussels Airport in October 2004, it created a political crisis in Belgium. Yet, in 2017 DHL invested heavily in its Brussels hub and the site at Brussels Airport is now one of the main regional hubs in the DHL Express network.

Cincinnati/Northern Kentucky International Airport (CVG) is the United States global hub for DHL Aviation. 90% of volume originating in the United States transits out of the CVG hub. In July 2023, DHL announced a US$192M expansion at its CVG superhub, planning to add capacity for additional aircraft, new maintenance facilities, a new hangar, new offices, and capacity upgrades to keep up with increasing volume. DHL also has four smaller gateway hubs in the United States, located at Chicago-O'Hare International Airport (ORD), New York-JFK (JFK), Los Angeles International Airport (LAX), and Miami International Airport (MIA).

In March 2021, DHL Aviation announced the relocation of one of its main hub operations from Bergamo to Milan Malpensa Airport, where it opened new logistics facilities.

In September 2021, DHL opened a new, 240,000 square foot sort facility at their Hamilton gateway hub in Hamilton, Ontario at John C. Munro Hamilton International Airport to better support the companies Canadian hub as well as invest in the growth of their operations at the airport.

== Fleet ==
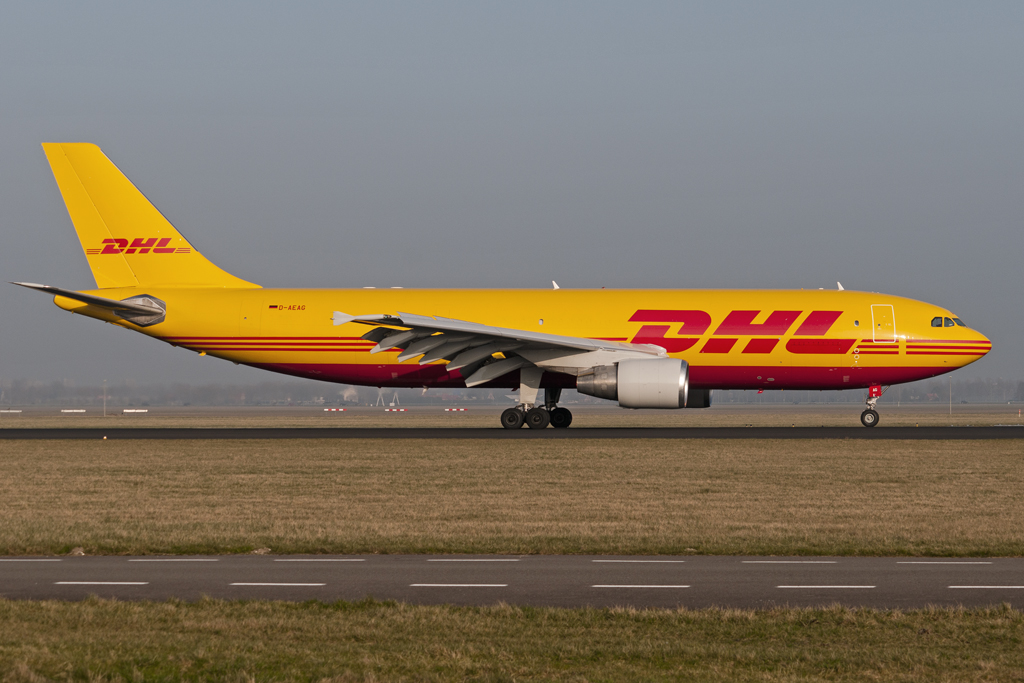
A DHL Airbus A300-600RF operated by EAT Leipzig

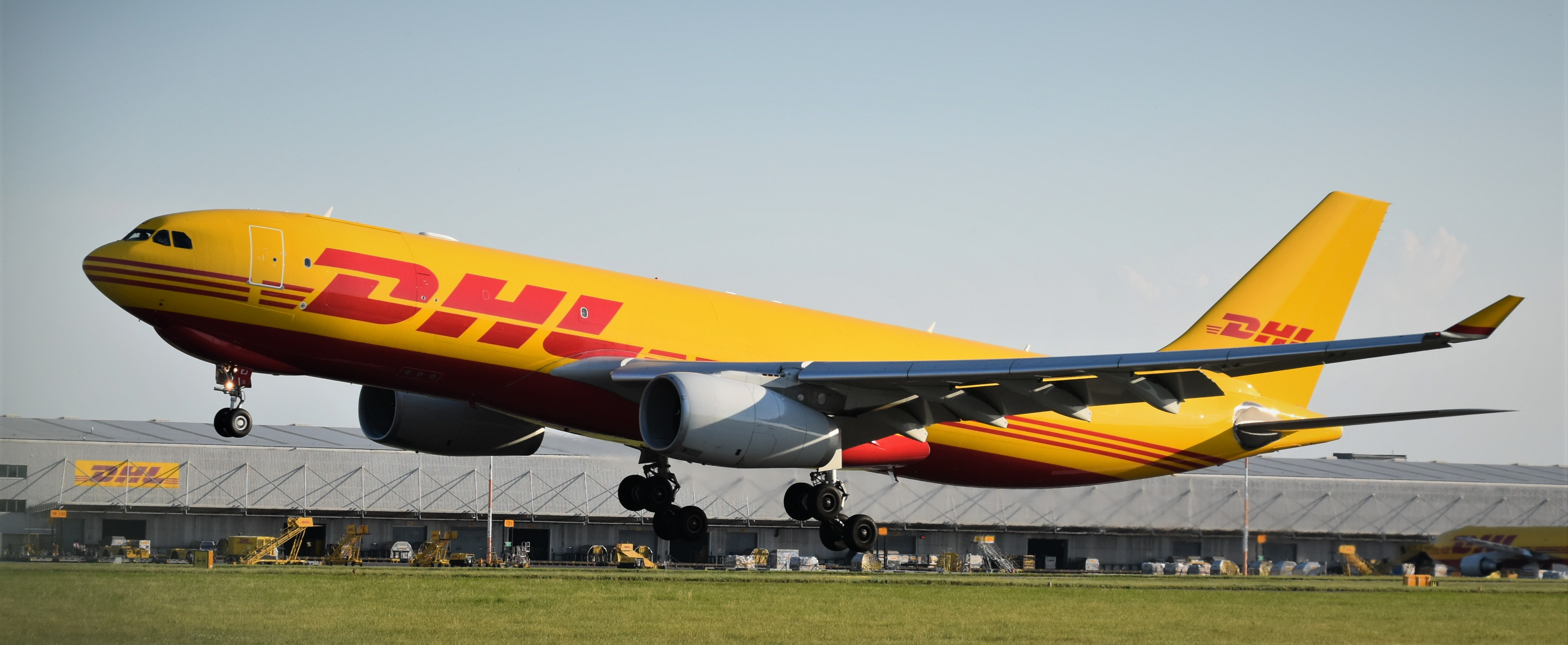
A DHL Airbus A330-200F operated by EAT Leipzig

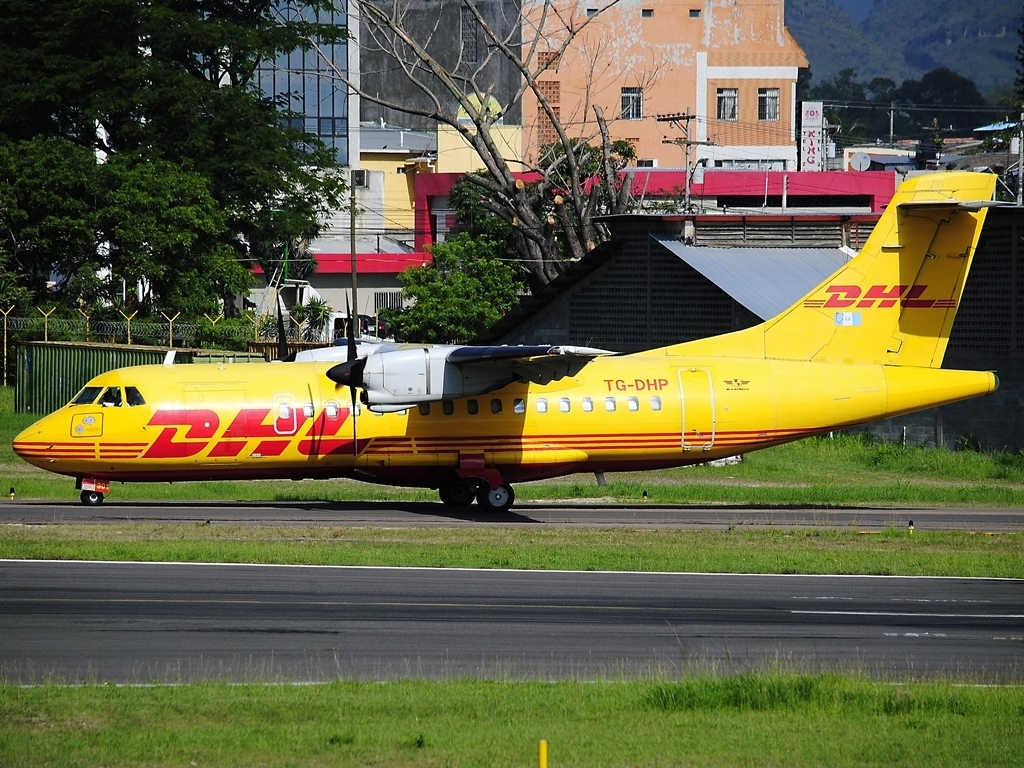
A DHL ATR 42-320F operated by DHL de Guatemala

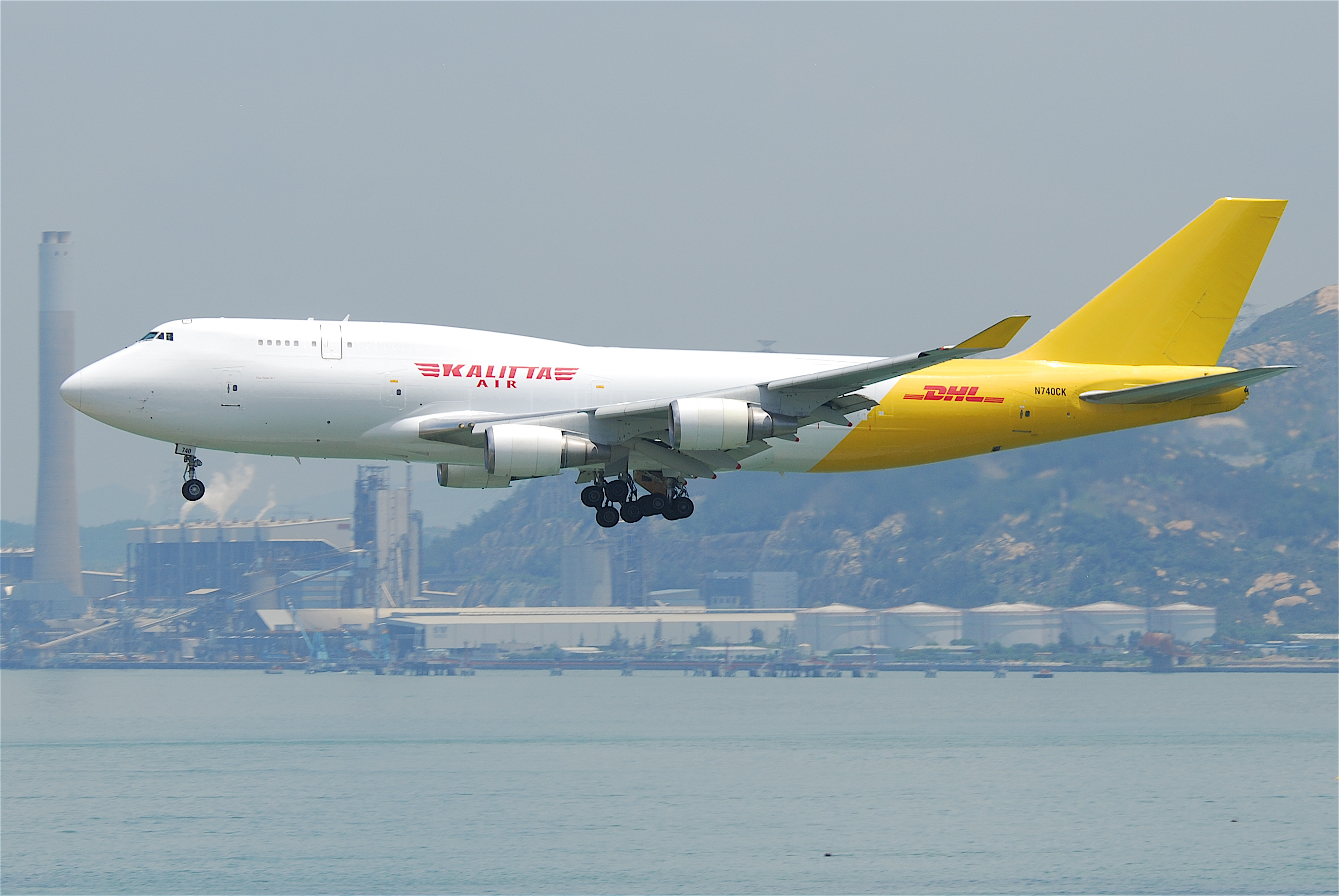
A DHL Boeing 747-400BCF operated by Kalitta Air

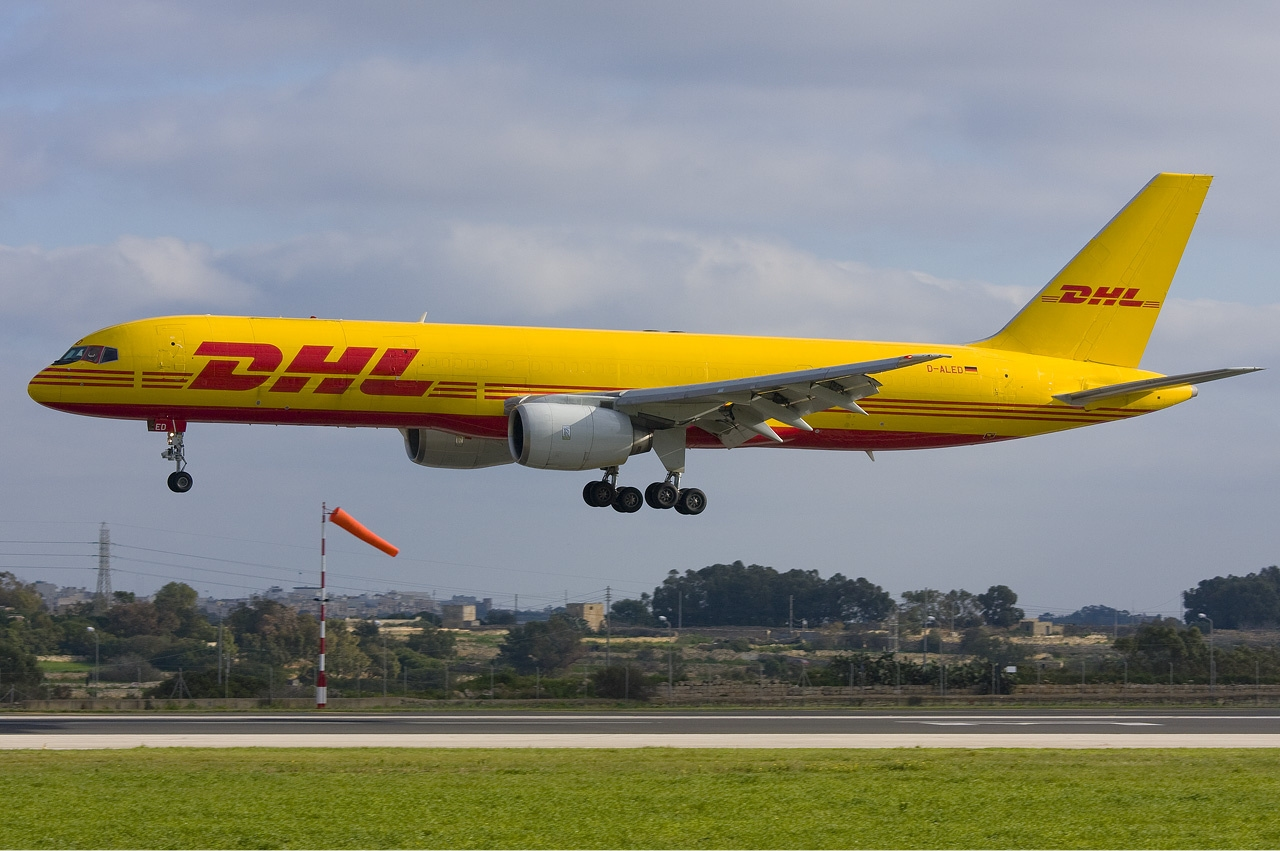
A DHL Boeing 757-200PCF operated by EAT Leipzig

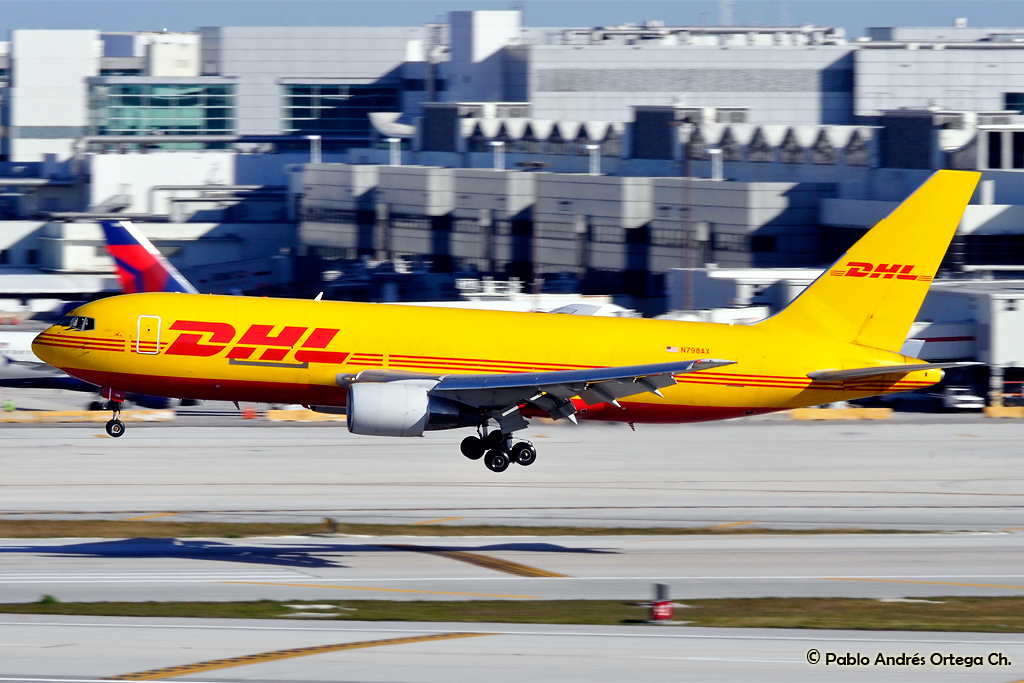
A DHL Boeing 767-200BDSF operated by ABX Air

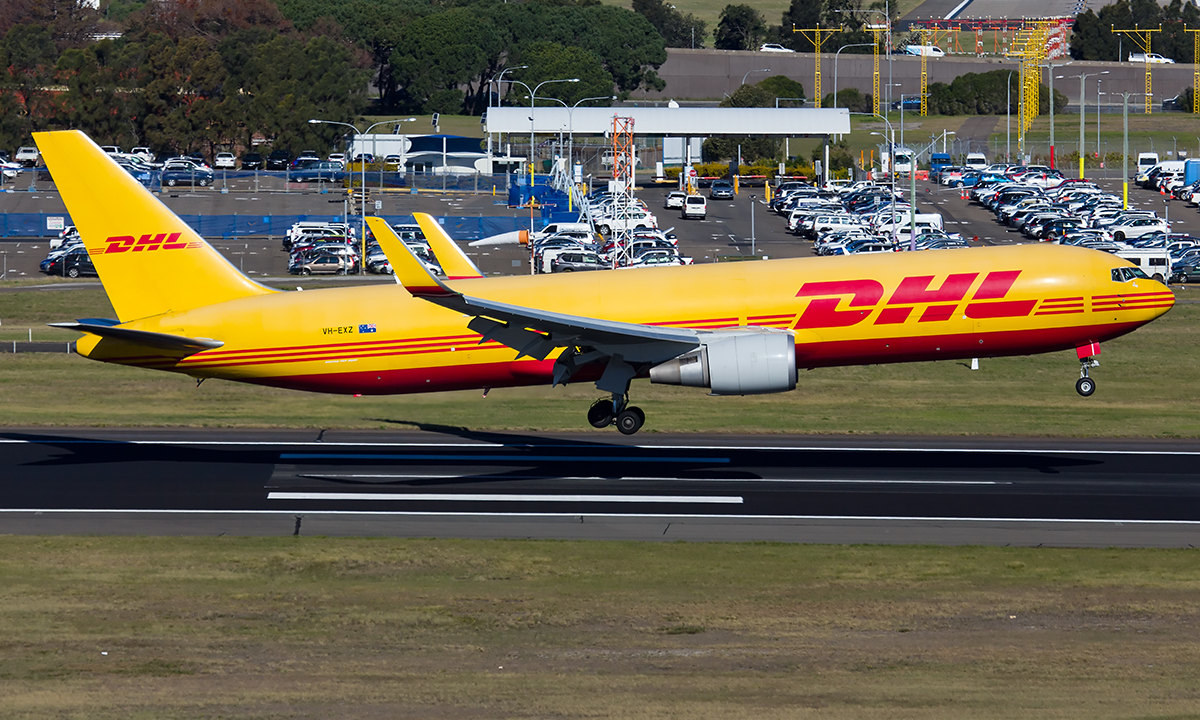
A DHL Boeing 767-300F operated by Tasman Cargo Airlines

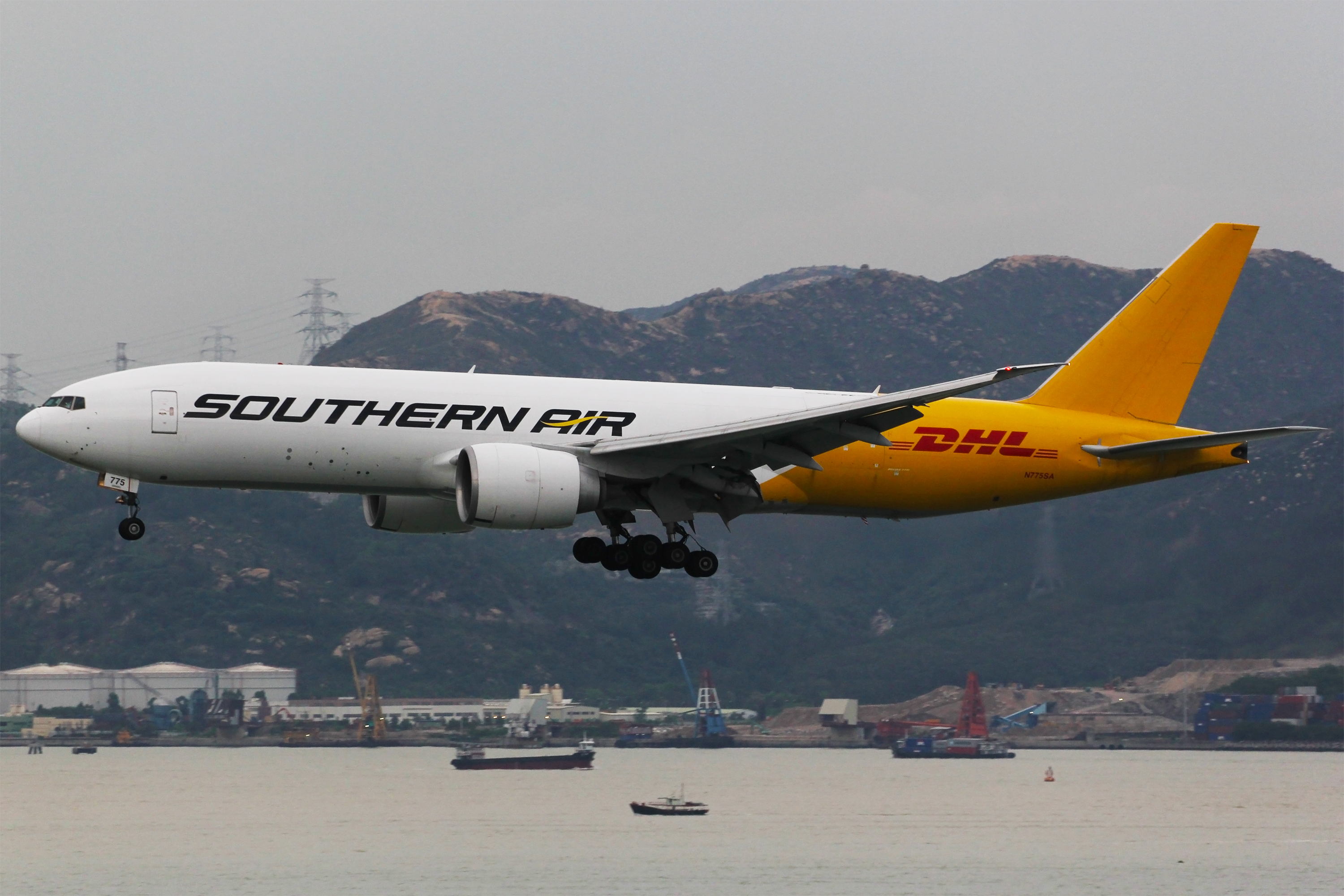
A DHL Boeing 777F now operated by Atlas Air

As of December 2025, the DHL Aviation fleet consists of the following aircraft:

DHL Aviation fleet
Aircraft	In service		Orders	Operator	Notes
Airbus A321-200PCF	1	1	—	Levu Air Cargo	
Boeing 777F	32	2	—	Polar Air Cargo	
Eviation Alice	—	—	12	DHL International Aviation ME	Deliveries to commence in NET 2027.

== Accidents and incidents ==
- In 2002, BAL Bashkirian Airlines Flight 2937, a Tupolev Tu-154 passenger jet, collided with DHL International Aviation ME Flight 611, a Boeing 757-200 cargo jet at 35,000 ft (11,000 m) over Überlingen, Germany. All 69 passengers on board the Bashkiran flight (consisting mainly of Russian schoolchildren) and the two pilots of DHL were killed.
- The DHL shootdown incident in Baghdad on 22 November 2003 wherein Iraqi insurgents fired an SA-7 "Grail" surface-to-air missile at a European Air Transport Airbus A300 operating on behalf of DHL Aviation. The aircraft took off from Baghdad airport whereupon the missile struck the left wing, disabling all three hydraulic systems and set the wing on fire. The aircraft began a dangerous phugoid (vertical oscillation) but the crew managed to land safely at the airport, despite only being able to control the aircraft by adjusting the engine thrust.
- On 13 August 2004, Air Tahoma Flight 185, a Convair 580 crashed in Florence, Kentucky due to fuel starvation and pilot error.
- On 18 March 2010, Exin Flight 3589, a DHL Antonov An-26 aircraft made an emergency landing on the frozen Lake Ülemiste, close to Lennart Meri Tallinn Airport. Initial reports indicated problems with the landing gear and one of the engines. The flight was operated by Exin on behalf of DHL. The aircraft involved was SP-FDO and the flight departed from Helsinki Airport. One of the six crew members was injured.
- On 13 February 2021, the cargo door of DHL Air UK Flight 126, Boeing 757-200 freighter registered G-DHKZ, opened at an altitude of approximately 5,300 ft (1,600 m) after the aircraft departed from Leipzig/Halle Airport. Airframe parts fell on the grounds of a power plant approximately 10 nmi (12 mi; 19 km) from the airport, but no cargo was lost, and the flight crew was able to return to Leipzig/Halle with no injuries. The incident is under investigation.
- On 7 April 2022, DHL de Guatemala Flight 7216, a Boeing 757-27A (PCF), crash landed in San Jose, Costa Rica after attempting an emergency landing due to a hydraulic failure. Both crew members survived without injuries.
- On 25 November 2024, Swiftair Flight 5960, a Boeing 737-476F, crashed into a house near Vilnius Airport in Vilnius, Lithuania. Out of the four occupants on board, one died while two others were injured.

== See also ==
- 2003 Baghdad DHL attempted shootdown incident
- 2002 Überlingen mid-air collision
- DHL de Guatemala Flight 7216
- 2004 Air Tahoma CV-580 crash
- 2024 Swiftair Boeing 737 crash
