= Vickers Vanguard =

British medium-range airliner with 4 turboprop engines, 1959

Vanguard
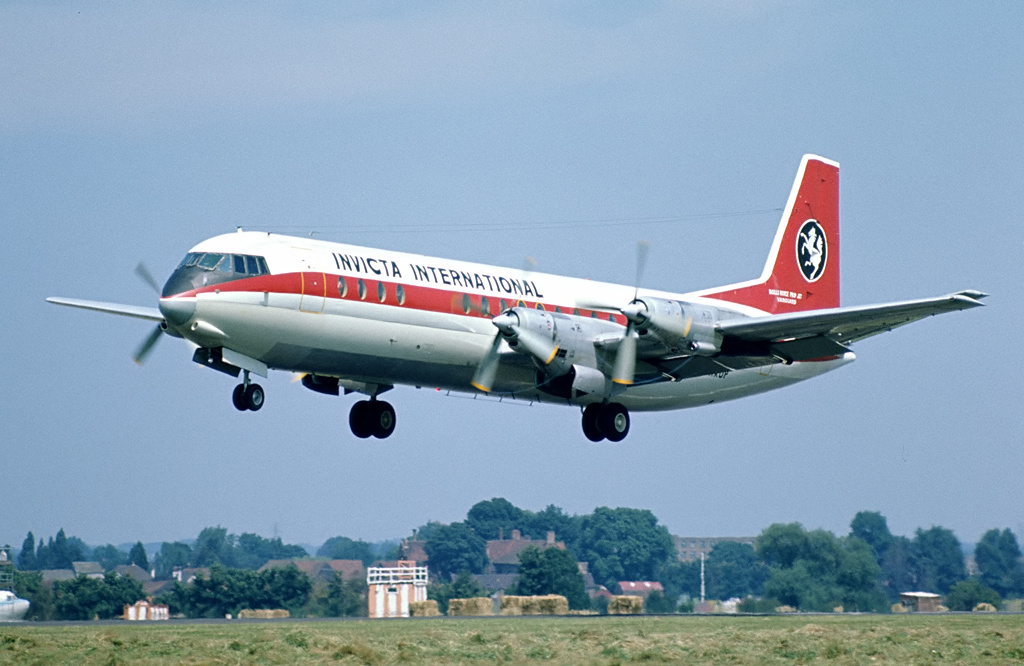
- A Vickers Vanguard of Invicta International Airlines. This aircraft was involved in the Flight 435 crash.

General information
- Type: Airliner
- National origin: United Kingdom
- Manufacturer: Vickers-Armstrongs
- Primary users: British European Airways Trans-Canada Air Lines
- Number built: 44

History
- Introduction date: 17 December 1960 (by British European Airways)
- First flight: 20 January 1959
- Retired: 17 October 1996
- Developed from: Vickers Viscount

The Vickers Vanguard is a short/medium-range turboprop airliner designed and produced by the British aircraft manufacturer Vickers-Armstrongs.

The Vanguard was developed during the mid-to-late 1950s in response to a specification issued by British European Airways (BEA) for a 100-seat airliner; Vickers decided to design such an airliner as a follow-up to the existing Viscount series, the principal difference from which being an expanded airframe that provided considerably more internal volume. Another key innovation was the Tyne engine, which was roughly twice as powerful as the Viscount's Rolls-Royce Dart engine, and allowed for increases in both cruising speed and altitude. Throughout the design process, the needs of two airlines, BEA and Trans-Canada Air Lines (TCA), heavily shaped the Vanguard's specifics.

The Vanguard was brought into revenue service on 17 December 1960, around the same time as the commercial availability of a new generation of jet-powered airliners; as a result, these competitors quickly overshadowed its performance and led to the type being largely ignored by the market. Only 44 aircraft were ever built, the type having been ordered by BEA and TCA. After only about ten years' service, TCA experimentally converted one of its Vanguards to a freighter configuration, calling it the Cargoliner. Considered to be a success, the majority of Vanguards were converted into freighters during the early 1970s, those from BEA becoming the Merchantman. As a freighter, the type remained in service for many years, the final example being retired in 1996.

== Development ==
=== Background ===
The origins of the Vanguard can be traced back to speculative discussions between Vickers and the airline British European Airways (BEA) conducted as early as 1953, the same year in which the commercially successful Vickers Viscount airliner first entered revenue service. Even at this early stage, the two firms had envisioned the introduction of a successor to the Viscount entering service around 1959. This envisioned successor airliner would possess economics 10 per cent greater than those of the Viscount, while also being considerably faster throughout all operational stages. Out of BEA's internal analysis of various options, which studied both turboprop and pure jet propulsion arrangements, it became clear that a larger aircraft that could accommodate bigger payloads was highly desirable.

On 19 April 1953, BEA's chief executive, Peter Masefield, outlined the company's requirements in a letter to Vickers; these criteria included a cruise speed of 370 knots (430 mph; 690 km/h), a standard range of 1,000 miles (1,600 km), with 305 miles (490 km) in reserve fuel, the ability to accommodate up to 100 passengers, and an explicit preference for a high-wing configuration. Coincidentally, another airline, Trans-Canada Air Lines (TCA), also made contact with the manufacturer with its own list of requirements, calling for a Viscount-like airliner capable of servicing its transcontinental routes while carrying up to 60 passengers. Recognising the potential to fulfil both airlines' requirements in a single airliner, Vickers' design team commenced work on producing such an aircraft.

Vicker's initial proposal, known as the Type 870 or alternatively as the Viscount Major, was incapable of meeting BEA's criteria, and was quickly dismissed. On 14 May 1951, Vickers met with Rolls-Royce representatives to discuss potential engines for their envisioned airliner; the meeting led to the decision to adopt the in-development Rolls-Royce Tyne powerplant for its revised proposal. While considerations towards adopting a turbojets engine were made, a study performed in November 1953 found that such an engine would produce inferior performance over shorter routes to a turboprop counterpart. It was around this time that Vickers' design team also discarded notions of adopting a swept wing, largely due to its providing little benefit at the envisioned airliner's 350-knot (400 mph; 640 km/h) cruise speed, as well as its inferior performance during the approach stage of flight.

=== Redesign ===
Despite BEA's initial preference for a high-mounted wing, the company opted for a low-mounted wing following the adoption of a double-bubble fuselage. This type of fuselage was necessary because of the large proportion of freight which BEA needed to carry. It was considered by Vickers to be impractical if carried at the same level as the passengers due to the excessive length that would be required, but carrying the freight in a lengthy hold beneath the main cabin was a practical arrangement. Furthermore, TCA wanted a low-mounted wing, which would make the aircraft easier to refuel, de-ice and service, as well as giving a statistically significant improvement in survival in the event of a water landing.

By 13 April 1955, the range of design studies had been shortlisted down to five, these remaining concepts were jointly evaluated by BEA and Vickers. Of these submissions, it was recognised that the combination of the low-mounted wing and the double-bubble fuselage represented the optimum configuration, having offered the best capacity and versatility amongst other attributes. This conceptual aircraft, referred to as the Type 870 Scheme 16a, could accommodate 88 passengers, a cruising speed of 360 knots (420 mph; 680 km/h) at 25,000 ft (7,600 m), and payload of 20,000 lb (9,100 kg). While BEA were interested in relatively short, sub-1000 mile, routes, its fuel tanks were progressively enlarged over several revisions to give a range of 2,600 miles (4,200 km) so that the airliner would be acceptable to TCA as well.

The Type 900 was a further revision of the design, featuring an expanded payload capacity of 21,000 lb (9,500 kg) and carry up to 93 passengers. Following some relatively minor revisions, which largely bolstered the gross weight upwards, that were made to better suit the design to the needs of global customers, the definitive Type 950 proposal emerged. On 20 July 1960, BEA placed an initial order for 20 Type 950s, the type becoming subsequently known as the Vanguard; the airline publicly announced the order and its intended plan for the new airliner to succeed the Viscount in its fleet.

At the time, TCA was, while intensely interested in the airliner, not yet willing to commit itself, partially due to the basic model not entirely fulfilling its requirements, such as the level of capacity for air mail. Vickers recognised that a high-density seating configuration, accommodating up to 139 passengers to be carried, would likely be attractive to more operators, and designed the Type 952 model for this market. Following a particularly vigorous evaluation, during early January 1957, TCA announced that it had placed an order for 20 Type 952s. With a follow-on order for three more aircraft, it would be, measured in dollar worth, the largest single export deal in postwar Britain's history at that time.

=== Into production ===
The launch of the programme commenced immediately following BEA's initial order for the type. Due to the substantial growth of the airliner during the concept phase, engine supplier Rolls-Royce set about scaling up the Tyne engine from its initial output of 2,750 hp (2,000 kW) to at least 4,000 hp (3,000 kW). As the Vanguard's production line was coming online at Vickers' Weybridge facility, BEA recognised that, due to the typically short length of its routes, a higher density economy seating configuration could be adopted without impacting performance. Accordingly, on 23 July 1957, Vickers announced a new model, the Type 953, which could handle payloads of up to 29,000 lb (13,000 kg), which greatly improved the operating costs for BEA's preferred model; the airline quickly converted its order to six Type 951s and 14 Type 953s.

On 20 January 1959, the first Type 950 prototype G-AOYW conducted its maiden flight. The flight, a transfer to Wisley three miles away, had been planned for December but the engines were returned to Rolls-Royce for minor work. Proper flight testing was then carried out from Wisley. While development proceeded relatively smoothly, apart from over 2,000 flights being required to resolve unacceptable stalling characteristics, the last weeks of trials with BEA in early 1960 uncovered some engine-related difficulties, necessitating a brief delay while the compressor rotor was modified. With the issue resolved, the Vanguard entered revenue service with TCA on 1 February 1961, and with BEA one month later.

However, by the time of the Vanguard's entry to service, the attitudes of the travelling public had shifted in favour of the new bypass jet engines which did not use propellers. Passengers typically preferred the additional speed, even at the disadvantage of greater operating costs and thus higher ticket prices, that came with jet-powered airliners. As such, the turboprop-powered Vanguard did not sell well, although those examples that were introduced typically performed well in numerous capacities, and often had lengthy service lives.

== Design ==
The Vickers Vanguard was a turboprop-powered airliner designed for short- and medium-range services. The principal difference between the Vanguard and the preceding Viscount was in the construction of the fuselage; the Vanguard lower fuselage was similar to that of the Viscount but the top section had a larger-diameter giving a double bubble cross-section (somewhat similar to the Boeing Stratocruiser). The primary result of the larger upper portion was a more spacious interior, along with an increase in cargo capacity below the floor of the main cabin. A low-mounted straight wing was also adopted for the type, despite considerations towards shoulder-mounted and swept-wing alternatives. Aviation author C. F. Andrews observed the design to be orthodox in practically every respect.

The Vanguard's larger and heavier fuselage presented an obvious need to be combined with a more powerful engine, which led to the adoption of the newly developed Rolls-Royce Tyne engine. This powerplant was capable of generating a nominal 4,000 hp (3,000 kW), in comparison to the Viscount's Rolls-Royce Dart of about 1,700 hp (1,300 kW). The Tyne engine enabled the Vanguard to be operated at a substantially greater service ceiling and cruising speed. The Vanguard was one of the fastest turboprop airliners to ever be built, including much later designs such as the Saab 2000 and de Havilland Canada Dash 8. A pilot report describes maintaining 10,000 ft (3,000 m) altitude with three engines at idle power and propellers feathered and the port outer engine at maximum cruise power.

The flight deck of the Vanguard was particularly spacious for the era. The flying controls were designed with manual operation in mind and were aerodynamically balanced. In spite of this arrangement, according to Andrews, the onboard electrical systems were a major advance over the previous generation of airliners; amongst other capabilities, the engines could be started without the aid of a ground support cart. The Vanguard possessed relatively docile stall characteristics, in part due to the dihedral positioning of its horizontal stabiliser, which kept it clear of the jet efflux from the engines and aided longitudinal stability. However, acceptable stalling behaviour only came after an extensive programme of over 2,000 stalls to correct initial very violent tendencies which included rolling inverted.

== Operational history ==
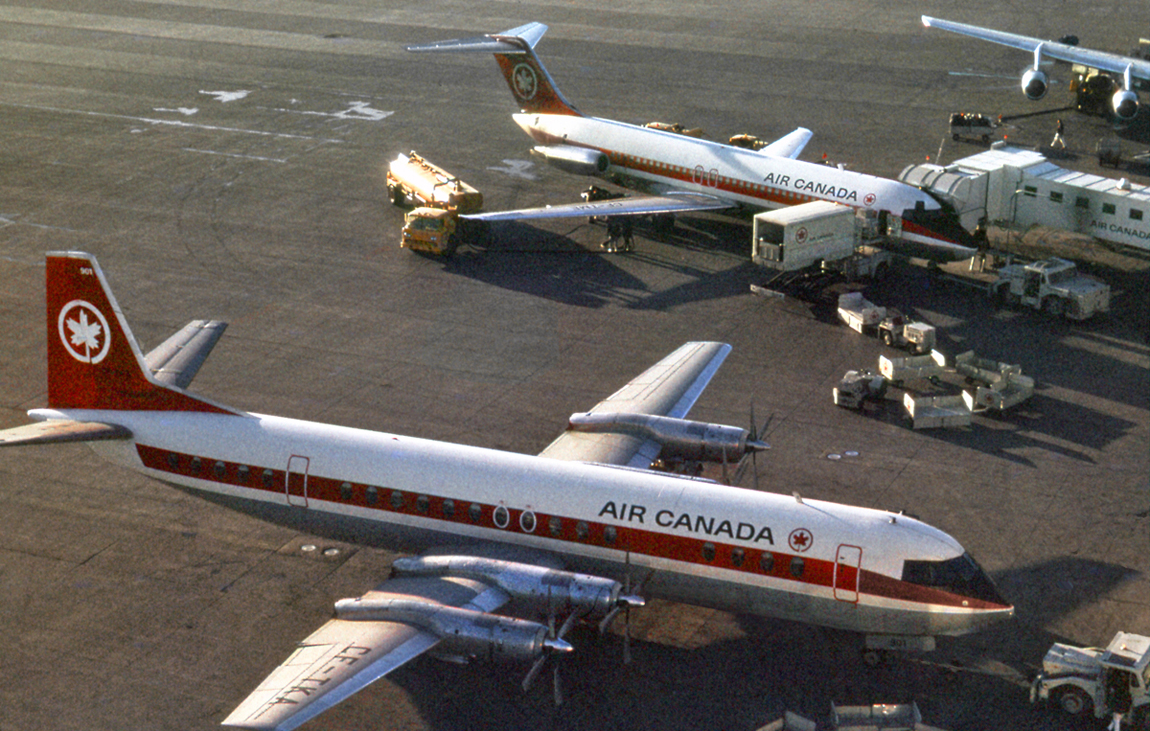
Vanguard 952 of Air Canada at Toronto Airport in March 1971, with a Douglas DC-9-32 in the background

The Vanguard entered service with BEA and TCA in late 1960. BEA operated its first Vanguard schedule on 17 December from Heathrow to Paris. Following delivery of its full fleet of six V951 and 14 V953 aircraft by 30 March 1962, the type took over many of BEA's busier European and UK trunk routes. The aircraft received names of famous Royal Navy warships; the first (registered G-APEA) was named "Vanguard", however by the time that the aircraft were delivered, BEA had adopted its new "red square" livery, which saw the end of naming and none of the Vanguards actually carried a name. Initial seating was 18 first-class at the rear and 108 tourist, but this was changed to 139 all-tourist, in which configuration the Vanguard had very low operating costs per seat-mile. On flights up to 300 miles (480 km), such as from London to Paris, Brussels and Amsterdam, the type could match the block times of the pure jets which were being introduced in the early 1960s. The remaining BEA fleet passed to British Airways (BA) on 1 April 1974 and the last BA passenger flight with the type was on 16 June 1974.

TCA initiated Vanguard schedules on 1 February 1961 with two flights from Toronto and Montreal via intermediate stops to Vancouver. The fleet was also used on services from Toronto and Montreal to New York and Nassau, Bahamas. Tyne engine reliability was a concern to the airline in the early 1960s. It had a Constellation on stand-by at Dorval Airport in Montreal and at Toronto to take Vanguard passengers in case an engine failed to start.

=== Cargo operations ===
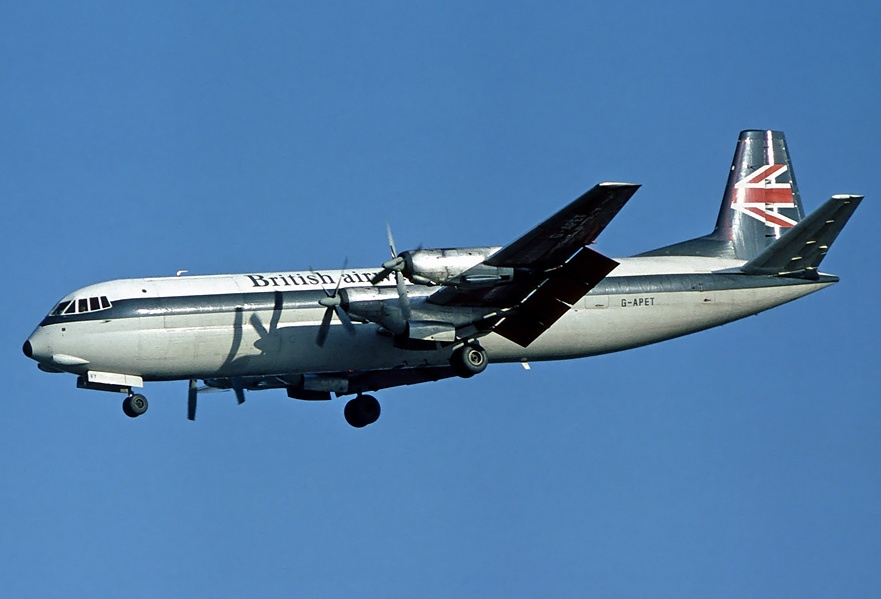
British Airways Cargo

In 1966, Air Canada removed all the seats from one of its aircraft and refitted for pure cargo work, in which role it could carry 42,000 lb (19,000 kg) of freight. Known by the airline as the "Cargoliner", it was the only such conversion, but survived to be the last Canadian Vanguard to be retired in December 1972.

BEA operated nine Vanguards modified to the V953C "Merchantman" all-cargo layout from 1969, with the first two conversions being designed and carried out by Aviation Traders Engineering Ltd (ATEL) at Southend Airport. BEA modified the remainder at Heathrow using kits from ATEL. A large forward cargo door measuring 139 by 80 inches (350 by 200 cm) was incorporated. The Merchantmen continued in service with BA until late 1979 when the remaining five were sold.

Air Bridge Carriers purchased several of the Merchantmen and operated them until 1992, when it changed its name to Hunting Cargo Airlines. Hunting Cargo operated its last V953C flight on 30 September 1996 and donated the aircraft, registered G-APEP, to Brooklands Museum on 17 October 1996.

== Accidents and incidents ==
- On 27 October 1965, British European Airways Vanguard registration G-APEE, flying from Edinburgh Airport to London Heathrow Airport, during a landing in poor visibility attempted an overshoot but crashed on runway 28R. All on board died – 6 crew and 30 passengers.
- On 2 October 1971, British European Airways Flight 706 operated by Vanguard G-APEC, crashed near Aarsele in Belgium. The cause was the failure of the rear pressure bulkhead and subsequent destruction of the tailplane. All 8 crew and 55 passengers died.
- On 10 April 1973, Invicta International Airlines Flight 435, operated by Vanguard registration G-AXOP, crashed near Basel-Mulhouse Airport Switzerland. Of the 145 people on board, four crew and 104 passengers died.
- On 29 January 1988, Inter Cargo Service Flight 1004, operated by Vanguard F-GEJF, crashed on takeoff from Toulouse–Blagnac Airport when takeoff was attempted with only three fully operable engines. There were no casualties of the three crew and one passenger aboard.
- On 6 February 1989, Inter Cargo Service Flight 3132, operated by Vanguard F-GEJE, crashed on takeoff from Marseille-Marignane Airport, France. Three crew died; there were no passengers on board.

== Variants ==
Type 950
Prototype, one built and two fuselages were used as static test airframes.
Type 951
BEA, 20 ordered, six delivered. All in 127-seat, mixed class configuration (18 first and 109 economy).
Type 952
TCA, more powerful engine and stronger fuselage and wing for higher weights, 23 delivered.
Type 953
BEA, Same engines as 951, but the stronger airframe of the 952. Mostly operated as 135-seater, all economy, but some configured as 127 mixed class the same as 951. A total of 14 delivered replacing an order for 951s.
Type 953C Merchantman
Nine Cargo conversions from Type 953.

== Operators ==
These airlines operated the Vickers Vanguard:

♠ original operators

Canada

- Air Canada inherited 23 Srs 952s from Trans Canada Air Lines in June 1964
- Trans-Canada Air Lines ♠ 23 Srs 952, became Air Canada in June 1964

France

- Europe Aéro Service
- Inter Cargo Service
- Occitan Air

Gabon

- Air Gabon

Iceland

- Air Viking one aircraft leased in 1970
- Thor Air Cargo two aircraft leased in 1971

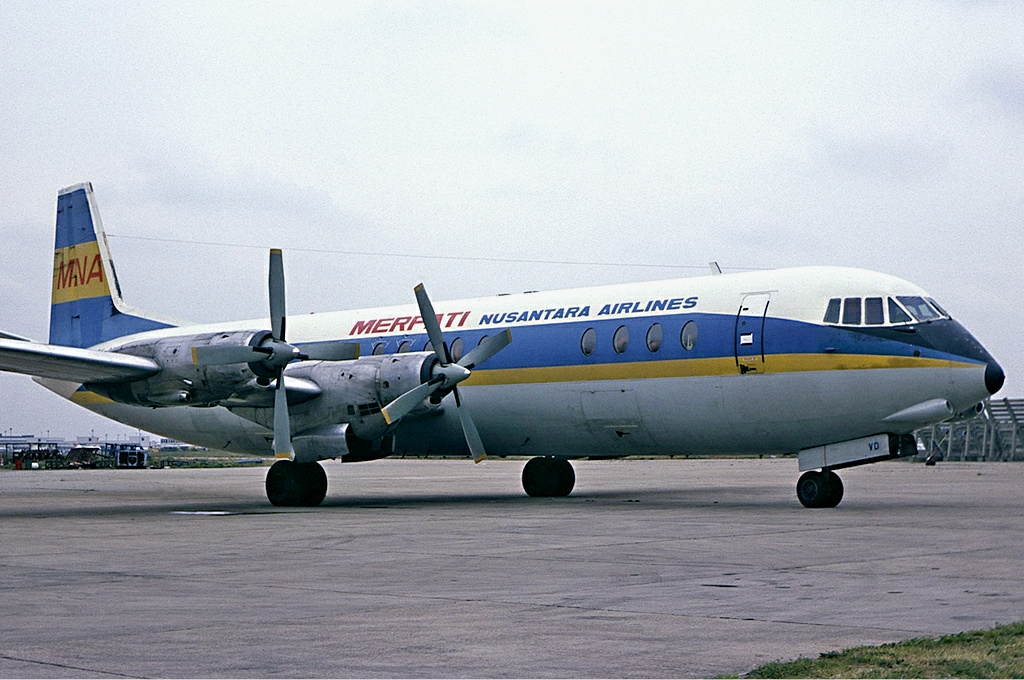
A Merpati Nusantara Vickers Vanguard 953 in 1977

Indonesia

- Air Fast one aircraft was operated by Air Tenggara on Air Fast services
- Angkasa Civil Air Transport leased one aircraft in 1970
- Merpati Nusantara Airlines

Lebanon

- Lebanese Air Transport leased one aircraft in 1970

Singapore

- Air Tenggara leased one aircraft in 1981 and operated for Air Fast

Sweden

- Air Trader three aircraft leased in 1972

United Kingdom

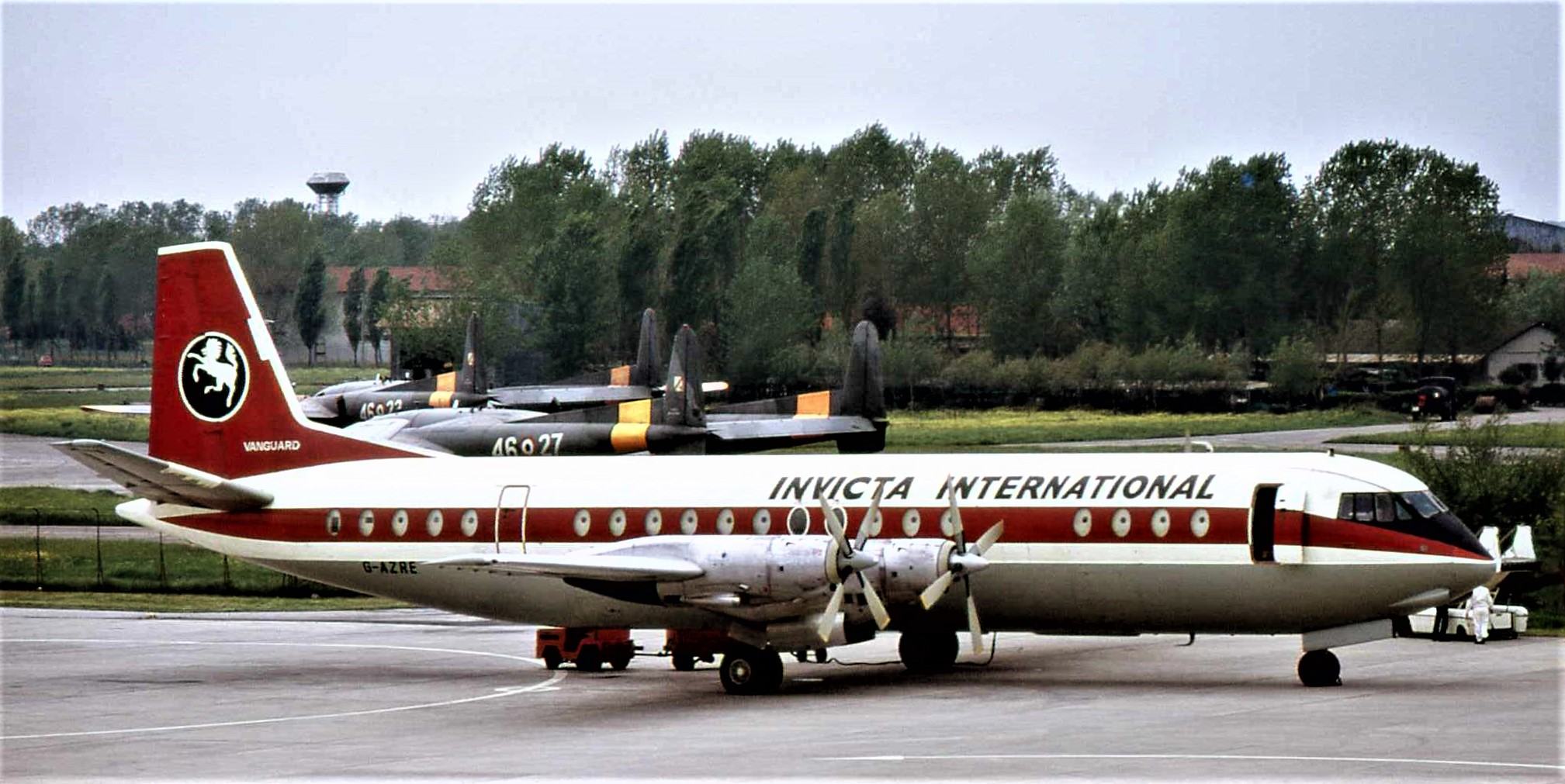
Invicta International Vanguard G-AZRE at Pisa Airport in 1974.

- Air Bridge Carriers
- British Airways inherited three passenger aircraft and nine Merchantman freighters on formation in 1974
- British European Airways ♠ - 20 Srs 951/953s some later converted to Merchantman
- DHL Air
- Elan Air Cargo
- Hunting Cargo Airlines
- Invicta International Airlines
- Silver City Airways, one Air Holdings aircraft operated in 1973

== Aircraft on display ==
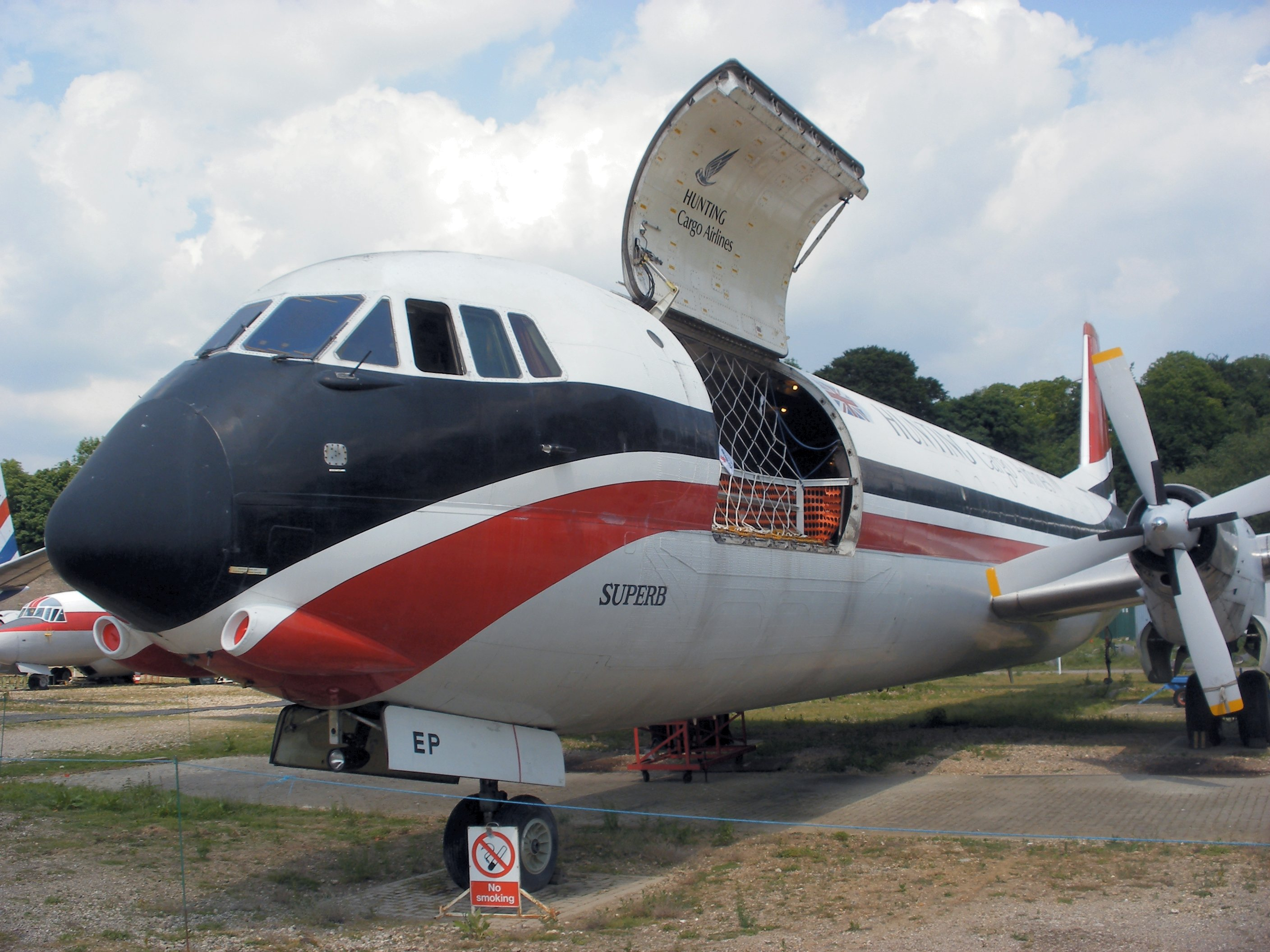
Vickers Vanguard 953C Merchantman Superb at Brooklands Museum, Weybridge.

- Type 953C Merchantman Ajax (formerly registered G-APEJ) on static display inside Stratosphere Chamber at the Brooklands Museum, Surrey, England. (nose section only)
- Type 953C Merchantman Superb (formerly registered G-APEP) at the Brooklands Museum, Surrey, England. The only intact airframe in existence.
- Type 953C Merchantman Swiftsure (formerly registered G-APES) on static display at East Midlands Aeropark (nose section only)

== Specifications (Type 952) ==
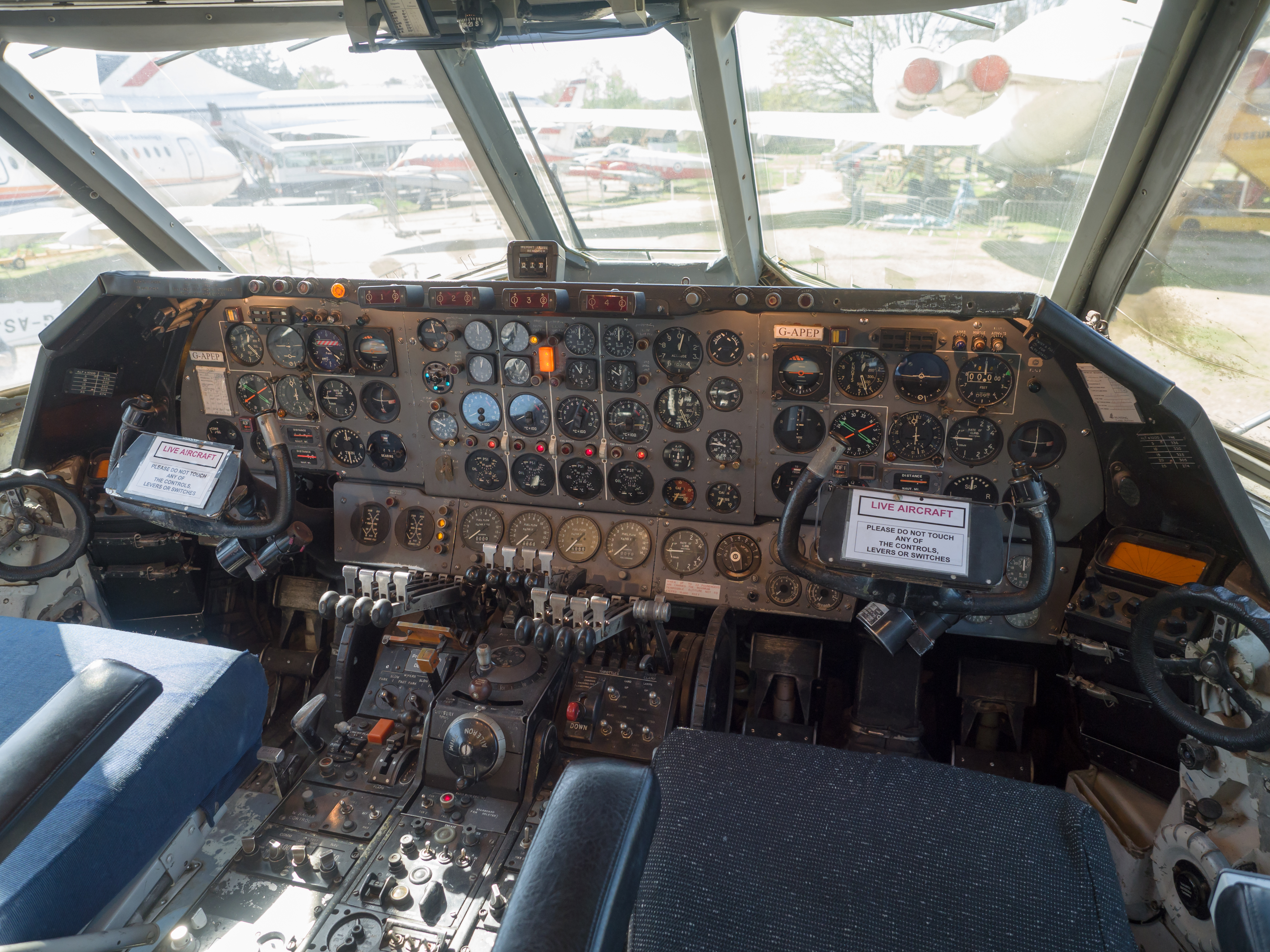
Cockpit

Data from Vickers Aircraft since 1908

General characteristics

- Crew: 3
- Capacity: 139 passengers
- Length: 122 ft 10 1/2 in (37.452 m)
- Wingspan: 118 ft 0 in (35.97 m)
- Height: 34 ft 11 in (10.64 m)
- Wing area: 1,527 sq ft (141.9 m^{2})
- Empty weight: 85,000 lb (38,555 kg)
- Gross weight: 141,000 lb (63,957 kg)
- Powerplant: 4 × Rolls-Royce Tyne RTy.11 Mk 512 turboprops, 5,545 shp (4,135 kW) each (eshp)

Performance

- Cruise speed: 422 mph (679 km/h, 367 kn) at 15,000 ft (4,600 m) (high speed cruise)
- Range: 1,830 mi (2,950 km, 1,590 nmi) with maximum payload
- Service ceiling: 30,000 ft (9,144 m)

== See also ==
Related development

- Vickers Viscount

Aircraft of comparable role, configuration, and era

- Antonov An-10
- Bristol Britannia
- Ilyushin Il-18
- Lockheed L-188 Electra
- Canadair CL-44
