= Levu Air Cargo =

Brazilian airline

| IATA | ICAO | Call sign |
|---|---|---|
| — | LVU | LEVU CARGO |
- Founded: May 16, 2022; 4 years ago
- Commenced operations: November 12, 2024; 23 months ago
- AOC #: 15,806 - November 7, 2024
- Hubs: Viracopos International Airport
- Secondary hubs: Recife/Guararapes–Gilberto Freyre International Airport
- Fleet size: 1
- Destinations: None
- Headquarters: Campinas, Brazil
- Key people: Rodrigo Pacheco (CEO)
- Founder: Rodrigo Pacheco
- Website: www.levuaircargo.com

Notes
- In March 2025, operations were temporarily suspended, and the company was preparing to resume activities. On 2026 fully grounded.

Levu Transporte Aéreo e Logística, known as Levu Air Cargo, was a Brazilian cargo airline headquartered in Campinas, São Paulo. The company established a strategic partnership with DHL Supply Chain in 2024 to support domestic air freight operations in Brazil. Operations were temporarily suspended in March 2025.

== History ==
=== Establishment (2022-2024) ===
Levu Air Cargo was founded in May 2022 to meet Brazil's growing air cargo transportation demand. Initially, the airline announced its intention to be headquartered in Recife, Pernambuco, using Recife/Guararapes–Gilberto Freyre International Airport as its main base of operations, with a fleet of four Airbus A321-200PCF and Airbus A330-300P2F aircraft. The initial investment to found the new airline was R$55 million reais (US$10.9 million).

In mid-2022, the airline began its process to obtain its Air Operator Certificate (AOC) by the National Civil Aviation Agency of Brazil (ANAC).

On April 2, 2024, Levu Air Cargo launched its official website, presenting images of aircraft with its painting scheme and the map of planned routes and destinations, including Belém, Campinas/Viracopos, Manaus, Recife and São Paulo/Guarulhos, in the domestic market, in addition to Bogotá, Colombia, Miami, United States and Paris/Châlons Vatry, France, as international destinations.

==== Partnership with DHL Supply Chain ====
In May 2024, DHL Supply Chain announced a strategic partnership with Levu Air Cargo to launch a domestic air freight solution in Brazil. Through the agreement, the German company invested EUR 90.5 million to, together with the airline, expand its operations in the country. Thus, Levu will be responsible for the domestic air operations of DHL Express and its partners, with the planes operating in the colors of the German carrier.

For its part, Levu announced an investment of US$103 million to incorporate four aircraft into its fleet, which will be operated for DHL in Brazil, including the first A321PCF in Latin America, leased from Latvia-based SmartLynx Airlines.

On May 10, 2024, Levu received its first aircraft, the Airbus A321PCF registration PS-LVU (MSN 775), previously operated in Europe for DHL Aviation by SmartLynx. The aircraft arrived in Brazil with the colors of the new airline, in addition to the rear section and tail in yellow, with the DHL logo, reinforcing the strategic partnership between the two companies. The airline also reserved the aeronautical registration for its second aircraft and first wide-body in the fleet, the A330-300P2F registration PR-LVU (MSN 1146), which is in the process of being converted from passenger to cargo in France.

On May 22, 2024, Levu Air Cargo announced a strategic partnership with Aeroporto Brasil Viracopos (ABV), the concessionaire that manages Viracopos International Airport, in Campinas, choosing the airport as its main hub. On the occasion, the airline presented its ready-made facilities at the airport's Cargo Terminal (TECA).

On November 7, 2024, Levu Air Cargo received its Air Operator Certificate, AOC No. 2024-11-0LVU-01-00, from ANAC, giving it the green light to begin its domestic cargo flights. The Ordinance 15,806, of November 7, 2024 was published in the Diary of the Union (Diário Oficial da União, in Portuguese) on the same day.

As of March 2025, Levu Air Cargo temporarily suspended its operations. However, the company is actively preparing to resume its activities, as reported by AeroIN.

=== Flight operations (2024-2026) ===
On November 12, 2024, Levu Air Cargo carried out its first commercial flight, taking off from its main hub at Viracopos International Airport, fulfilling flight LVU9000 towards Guararapes Gilberto Freyre International Airport, in Recife.

In March 2025, Levu Air Cargo temporarily suspended its operations after its sole aircraft, an Airbus A321F, experienced a technical issue. The aircraft remained grounded in Manaus for over five months before being transferred to São José dos Campos for maintenance at DIGEX facilities. Levu Air Cargo has confirmed its intention to resume operations following the completion of repairs and is also planning to expand its fleet with a second aircraft.

== Destinations ==
Levu Air Cargo operates cargo services to the following destinations in Brazil (as of November 2024):

| State | City | Airport | Notes |
|---|---|---|---|
| Amazonas | Manaus | Eduardo Gomes International Airport | Started on November 15, 2024 |
| Pernambuco | Recife | Gilberto Freyre International Airport | Started on November 12, 2024 |
| São Paulo | Campinas | Viracopos International Airport | Hub |

== Fleet ==
As of August 2025, Levu Air Cargo operates the following aircraft:

| Aircraft | Out of Service | Orders | Passengers | Note |
|---|---|---|---|---|
| Airbus A321-200PCF | 1 | | Cargo | stored, shared with DHL Aviation. |
| Total | 1 | | | |

== See also ==
- List of defunct airlines of Brazil
