= 1965 British European Airways Vickers Vanguard crash =

1965 aviation incident in London

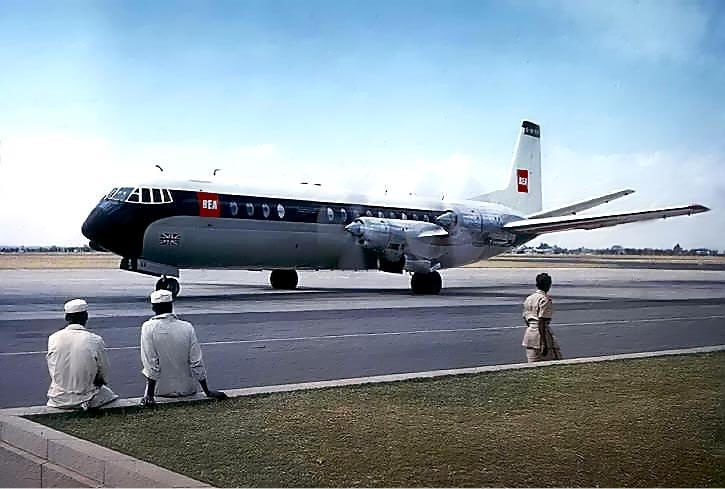
- A Vickers Vanguard 951 of British European Airways

Accident
- Date: 27 October 1965
- Summary: Crashed due to pilot error in low visibility during landing approach
- Site: London Heathrow Airport, London; 51.4775°N 0.461389°W

Aircraft
- Aircraft type: Vickers Vanguard 951
- Operator: British European Airways
- Registration: G-APEE
- Flight origin: Turnhouse Airport, Edinburgh
- Destination: Heathrow Airport, London
- Occupants: 36
- Passengers: 30
- Crew: 6
- Fatalities: 36
- Injuries: 0
- Survivors: 0

The 1965 British European Airways Vickers Vanguard crash was a domestic flight operated by a Vickers Vanguard 951 aircraft of British European Airways (BEA). On Wednesday, 27 October 1965, the aircraft crashed during landing at London Heathrow Airport, causing the deaths of all 36 people on board. At the time It was one of the deadliest aviation disasters in the United Kingdom.

== Aircraft ==
The Vickers Vanguard 951, registered as G-APEE, was a turboprop airliner built in 1959. It was designed for short- and medium-range flights and was then one of the fastest turboprop airliners.

== Circumstances ==
The aircraft was on a scheduled flight from Edinburgh Turnhouse Airport to Heathrow. The flight departed from Edinburgh at 23:17 on 26 October. The flight was uneventful until the aircraft approached London when, during the final approach to runway 28R, the aircraft encountered fog, with reports indicating visibility was less than 50 metres. Making an ILS approach with ATC talking it down through Precision Approach Radar, the aircraft overshot the runway twice and then entered a hold. On hearing another Vanguard had made its landing, the pilot made another attempt but on its final approach to runway 28R, the crew decided to overshoot, taking the nose up and reducing flaps. However the aircraft crashed 2,600 feet from the threshold at around 01:23 and burst into flames, killing everyone on board.

== Investigation and findings ==
The investigation into the crash revealed several key factors:

The visibility at the time of the crash was significantly below the required minimum for landing. Despite this, there was no evidence that the pilot was operating below the prescribed limits set by BEA for such conditions.

The investigation attributed the crash to pilot error. Contributing factors included low visibility, incorrect information given to the pilot, pilot fatigue, anxiety, lack of experience in landing in fog, and a series of procedural errors during the landing attempts. The aircraft had performed two missed approaches before the crash, and the final approach was marked by an incorrect flap selection and a misjudged descent rate, leading to a steep dive into the runway.

== In popular culture ==
In actor Brian Cox's autobiography, "Putting the Rabbit in the Hat", Cox described how he had purchased a ticket for the crash flight to attend a meeting with Sir Laurence Olivier the following day. Olivier cancelled the meeting, and while Cox considered taking the flight, he decided to return home only learning of the tragedy the next day.

== Memorial ==
A memorial plaque was installed at Edinburgh Airport to honour the victims of the crash. The tragic event is remembered as one of the significant accidents in BEA's history, contributing to advancements in aviation safety and maintenance protocols.

== See also ==
- List of accidents and incidents involving commercial aircraft
- Aviation safety
