= DHL de Guatemala Flight 7216 =

2022 aviation accident in Costa Rica

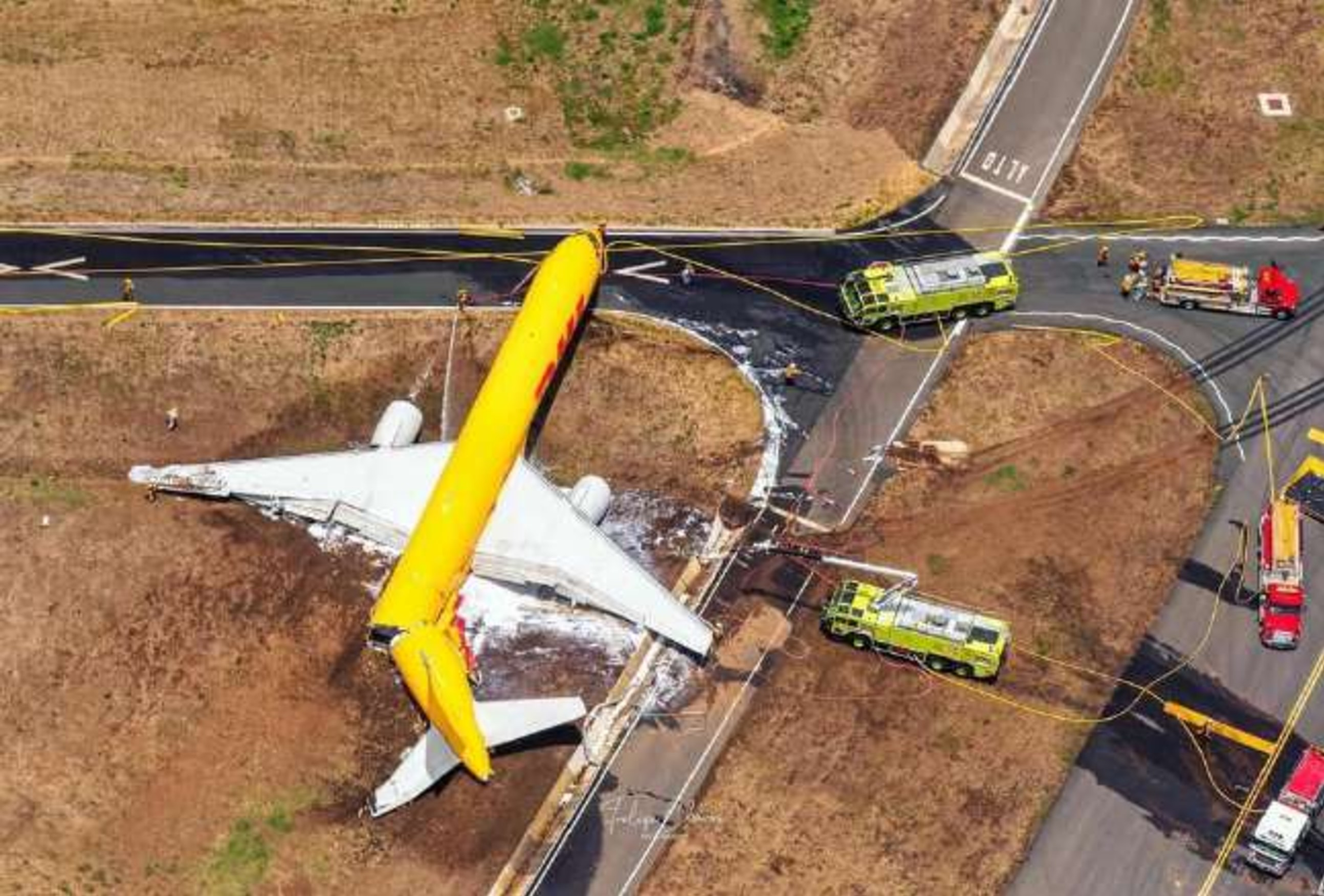
- Aerial view of the accident site

Accident
- Date: 7 April 2022
- Summary: Hydraulic failure followed by runway excursion
- Site: Juan Santamaría International Airport; 9°59′42.1074″N 84°12′9.36″W (approx.)

Aircraft
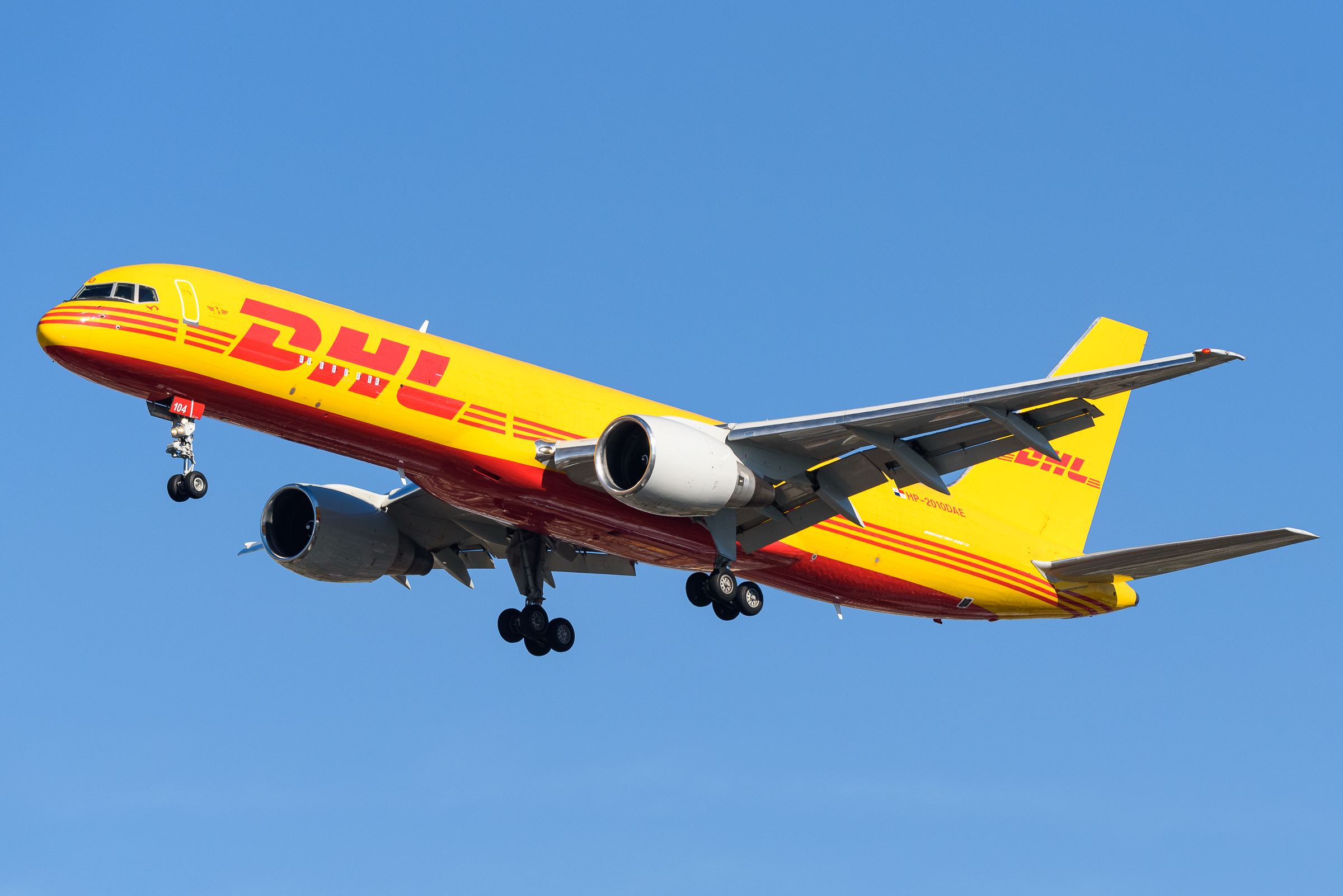
- HP-2010DAE, the Boeing 757 involved in the accident, three months before the crash
- Aircraft type: Boeing 757-27A (PCF)
- Aircraft name: Ciudad de David
- Operator: DHL de Guatemala for DHL Aero Expreso
- IATA flight No.: L37216
- ICAO flight No.: JOS7216
- Call sign: YELLOW 7216
- Registration: HP-2010DAE
- Flight origin: Juan Santamaría International Airport, San José, Costa Rica
- Destination: La Aurora International Airport, Guatemala City, Guatemala
- Occupants: 2
- Crew: 2
- Fatalities: 0
- Injuries: 0
- Survivors: 2

DHL de Guatemala Flight 7216 was an international cargo flight between Costa Rica's Juan Santamaría International Airport and Guatemala City's La Aurora International Airport. On 7 April 2022, the Boeing 757 suffered a hydraulic failure, and crashed on landing at the Costa Rican airport. Neither of the two pilots was injured.

== Background ==
=== Aircraft ===
The aircraft involved was a 22-year-old Boeing 757-27AF registered HP-2010DAE, with serial number 29610 and line number 904. The aircraft was first delivered to Far Eastern Air Transport in December 1999 as a passenger aircraft. The aircraft was leased to EVA Air from May 2002 to January 2004 before returning to Far Eastern Air Transport. The aircraft was withdrawn from service and later converted into a freighter aircraft in October 2010. DHL Aero Expreso took possession in November 2010.

=== Crew ===
The captain, age 58, had logged 16,381 flight hours, including 6,233 hours on the Boeing 757. The first officer, age 43, had 10,545 flight hours including 2,337 on the Boeing 757.

== Crash ==
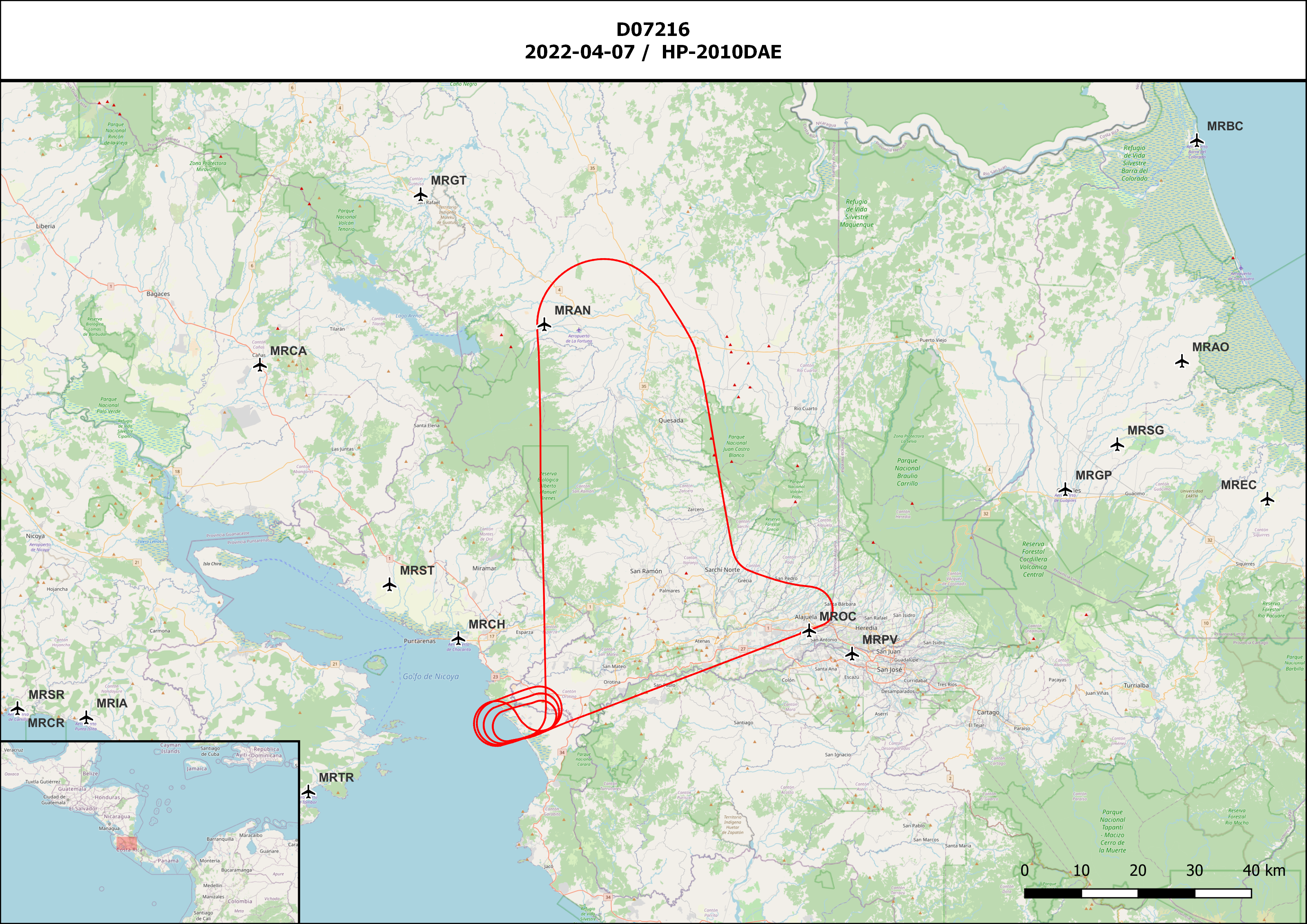
Flight path of Flight 7216

The flight took off at 9:34 AM local time (UTC−6:00) from Juan Santamaría International Airport to La Aurora International Airport to deliver cargo. Over the Costa Rican town of Muelle de San Carlos, the crew declared an emergency for hydraulic problems. After flying a holding pattern to empty the aircraft's fuel tanks, they returned to the departure airport and touched down at 10:24 am local time. At 10:25, the aircraft entered a right turn that the crew could not control, causing the aircraft to depart the runway.

== Investigation ==
The final report by the Costa Rican Technical Council for Civil Aviation (CETAC) was released on 22 September 2023, a year and a half after the accident.

=== Hydraulic failure ===
Fatigue and wire stress damage in the left landing gear hydraulic actuator hose caused loss of hydraulic fluid, leading to failure of the left hydraulic system. Failure of this particular system meant that the autobrake, left thrust reverser, rudder ratio, four of the twelve spoilers, and nose wheel steering were not functional. The flight crew followed correct procedures for this emergency per the aircraft manual. During the initially successful landing sequence, the flight crew properly applied reverse thrust on the right engine only and manual spoilers and brakes, using rudder and differential braking for steering.

=== Runway excursion ===
As the aircraft was slowing toward 60 knots, right reverse thrust was deactivated, while left forward thrust simultaneously increased to 91%. The asymmetric thrust caused the aircraft to accelerate and enter a right turn that the crew could not control. The aircraft departed the runway to the right, spun 180 degrees, and finally came to rest with its left main landing gear collapsed, fuselage broken into two pieces, and left engine still producing thrust. Both throttles were later found in the idle position according to correct shutdown procedure. There was no post-crash fire, and the crew exited with assistance from emergency responders without serious injury.

=== Explanations ===
Investigators explored three hypotheses to explain the left engine's increased thrust:

1. Mechanical failure in the throttle system was rejected by a Boeing analysis which showed the engine control had correctly responded to a manual throttle input.
2. Mistaking the left throttle for the speedbrake control was considered, but rejected, since the flight data recorder showed the left throttle and right reverser levers had been moved simultaneously.
3. Synchronous inadvertent manipulation of the left throttle and right thrust reverse levers due to "muscle memory" was considered the most likely cause.

=== Recommendations ===
The report recommended that the FAA make compliance with Boeing's service bulletin 757-29-0056 mandatory instead of voluntary. The bulletin, published over 20 years prior on 8 February 2001, addressed improvements to the hydraulic hoses that had failed on the accident aircraft. DHL was further encouraged to replace the hoses more frequently than recommended by Boeing, and to institute maintenance training that emphasizes installation of flexible hydraulic hoses in a manner that minimizes kinking and stress fatigue.

== Aftermath ==
The aircraft was written off as a result of the crash, the 12th hull loss of the Boeing 757. In December, the remains of the fuselage were preserved by the airport as a training aid for firefighters.
