= DHL de Guatemala =

Guatemalan airline

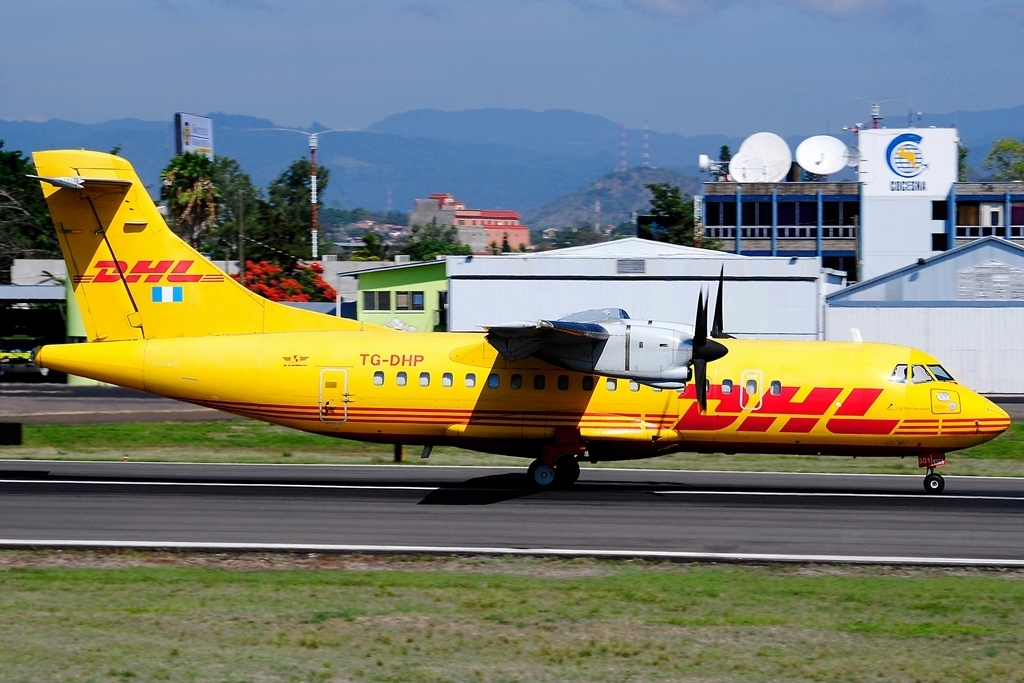
- DHL de Guatemala ATR 42-320F
IATA	ICAO	Call sign
L3	JOS	—
- Founded: 1989
- Hubs: La Aurora International Airport
- Fleet size: 2
- Destinations: 7
- Parent company: DHL Aero Expreso
- Headquarters: Guatemala City, Guatemala
- Website: www.dhl.com

DHL de Guatemala S.A. is a cargo airline based in Guatemala City, Guatemala. It is wholly owned by Deutsche Post and provides services for the group's DHL-branded logistics network in Guatemala. Its main base is La Aurora International Airport.

== Destinations ==
DHL de Guatemala operates freight services to the following international scheduled destinations (at January 2005):

Country	City	Airport	Notes
Costa Rica	San José	Juan Santamaría International Airport	
El Salvador	San Salvador	El Salvador International Airport	
Guatemala	Guatemala City	La Aurora International Airport	Hub
Honduras	San Pedro Sula	Ramón Villeda Morales International Airport	Operated for DHL Aviation
Honduras	Tegucigalpa	Toncontín International Airport	
Mexico	Mexico City	Mexico City International Airport	Seasonal
Panama	Panama City	Tocumen International Airport	

== Fleet ==
=== Current fleet ===
As of July 2026, DHL de Guatemala operates the following aircraft:

DHL de Guatemala fleet
Aircraft	In service	Orders	Notes
ATR 42-320F	2	—	Operating for DHL Aviation
Total	2	—	

=== Former fleet ===
As of August 2025, DHL de Guatemala operate 1 ATR 42-300F

- 1 Boeing 727-100F
- 2 Dassault Falcon 20
- 1 Fairchild Swearingen Metroliner

== Accidents and incidents ==
- On April 7, 2022, DHL de Guatemala Flight 7216, a Boeing 757-200PCF (registered HP-2010DAE) operated by DHL Aero Expreso, made an emergency landing after taking off from Juan Santamaría International Airport due to hydraulic issues. After the aircraft landed back, it veered off the runway and broke up into two parts after falling into a ditch. The accident caused No casualties nor injuries. The airport was shut down for several hours after the crash and the aircraft was written off.

== See also ==
- List of airlines of Guatemala
