= DHL Air UK =

British cargo airline

DHL Air

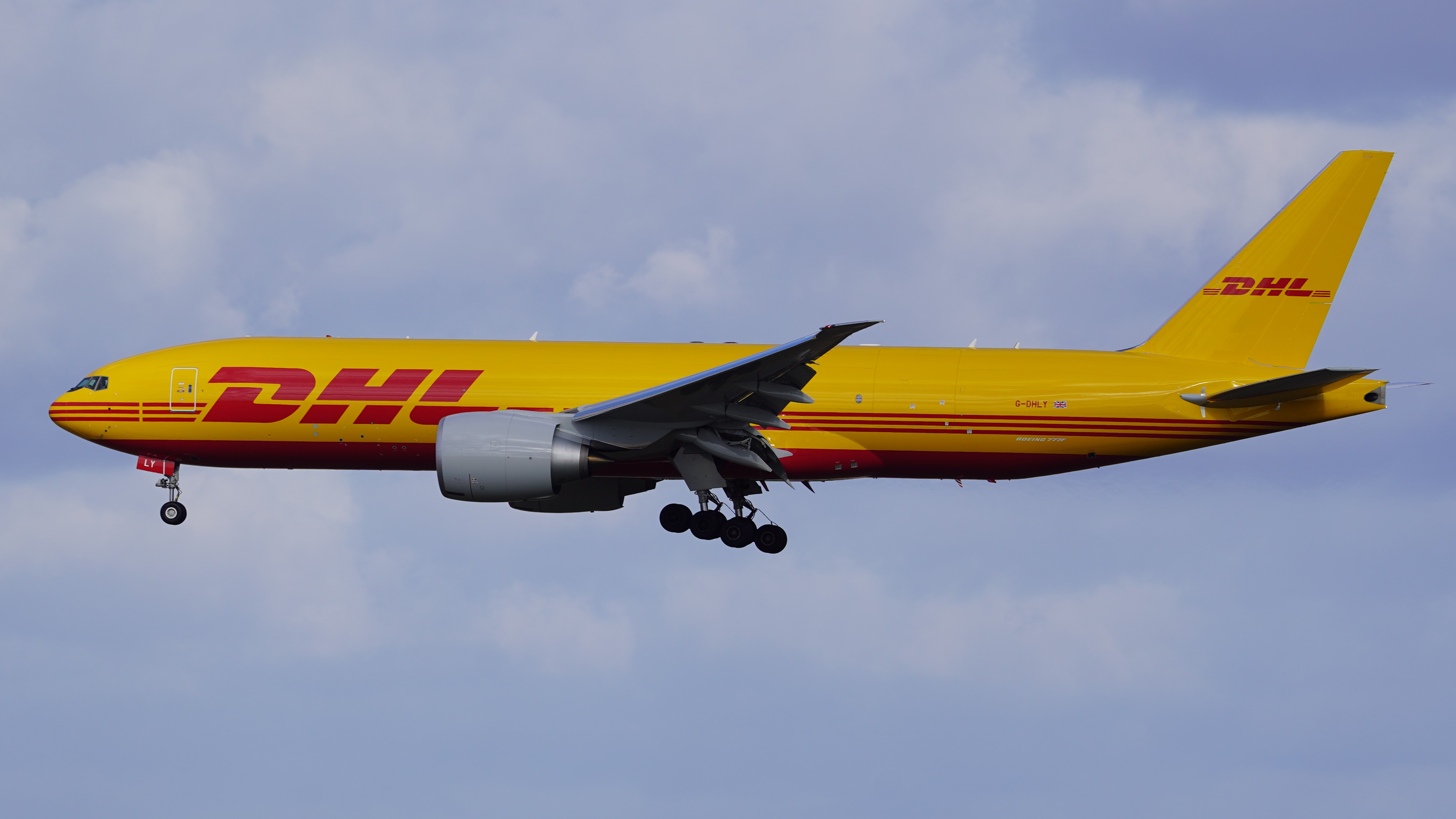
- Boeing 777F
IATA	ICAO	Call sign
D0	DHK	WORLD EXPRESS
- Founded: 11 October 1982 (as Elan Air)
- Commenced operations: April 1983
- AOC #: CAA2176
- Hubs: Brussels Airport; East Midlands Airport; Leipzig/Halle Airport
- Fleet size: 20
- Parent company: DHL
- Headquarters: Hounslow, London, United Kingdom
- Employees: 422 (2022)
- Website: dhl.com

DHL Air (UK) Limited is a British cargo airline based in Orbital Park, Hounslow, London. It is wholly owned by Deutsche Post and provides services on the group's DHL-branded parcel and express network in Europe. Its main base is East Midlands Airport. It forms a part of the greater DHL Aviation division.

== History ==
The company was formed as Elan Air Freight on 11 October 1982 as a joint venture between Air Bridge Carriers and DHL International. It commenced operations in April 1983. Elan Air operated night freight charters using the Armstrong Whitworth Argosy and Handley Page Dart Herald from Southern Ireland and Netherlands. The first green/ doc and red/ wpx bags were customs cleared by Import Agent John Yardley in the Elan Airside Warehouse from 1988-1990. The airline then acquired a Merchantman freighter version of the Vickers Vanguard and later the airline's name changed to DHL Air on 16 May 1989.

DHL Air has held a United Kingdom Civil Aviation Authority Type A air operator certificate since 30 November 2001 to transport passengers, cargo, and mail on aircraft with a capacity of 20 or more seats. After receiving the license, flight operations began in December 2001. The airline has 422 employees as of April 2022. Its main office is located at EMA Cargo West in the main DHL building at East Midlands Airport.

== Fleet ==
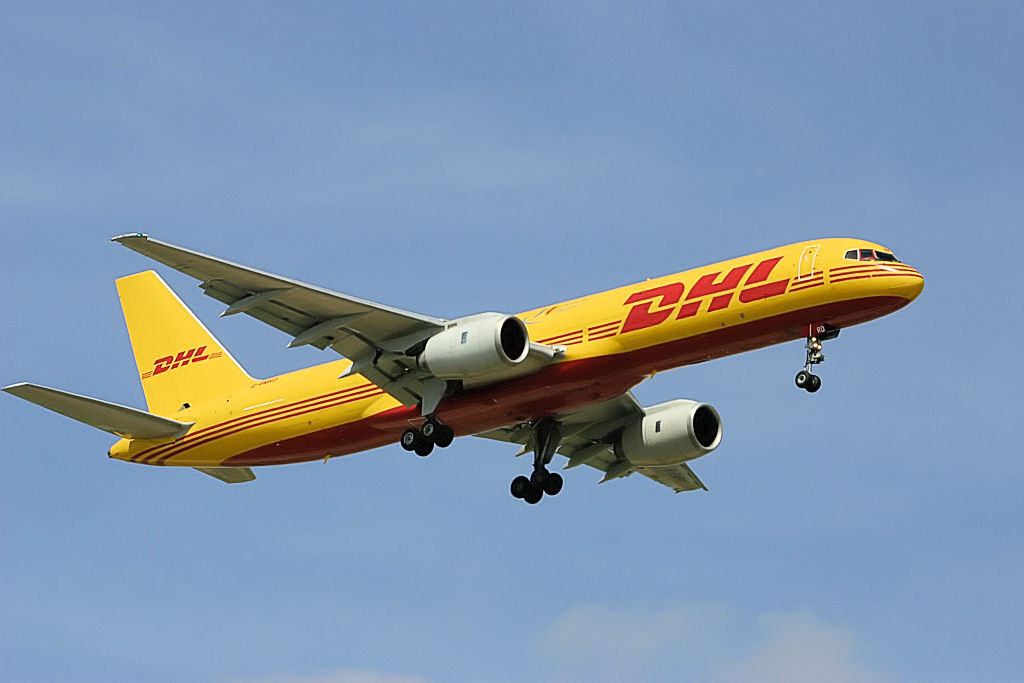
A DHL Air UK Boeing 757-200SF

=== Current ===
As of August 2025, DHL Air UK operates the following aircraft:

DHL Air fleet
Aircraft	In service	Orders	Notes
Boeing 757-200SF	5	—	
Boeing 767-300ER/BCF	5	—	
Boeing 767-300F	3	—	
Boeing 777F	7	—	
Total	20	—	

=== Former ===
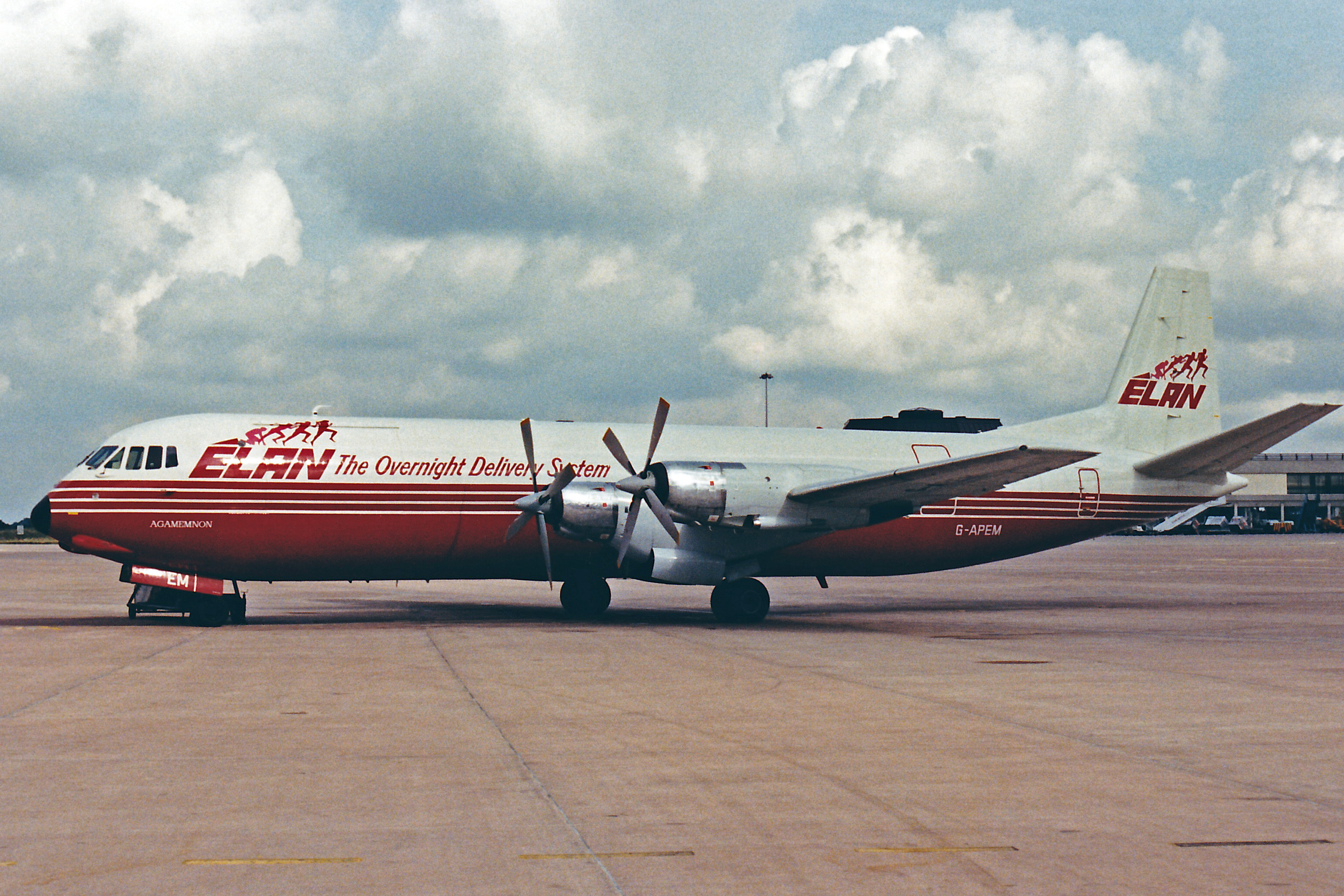
A former Elan Air Vickers Vanguard at Manchester Airport in 1987

The airline formerly operated the following aircraft:

Aircraft	Total	Introduced	Retired	Remarks
Armstrong Whitworth AW.660 Argosy	2	1984	1987	Operated by Air Bridge Carriers
Boeing 757-200PCF	20	2016	2022	
Boeing 757-200PF	1	2016	2022	Transferred to DHL Air Austria
Boeing 767-300ER(BDSF)	1			
Boeing 767-300F	1			
Handley Page Dart Herald	1	1986	1988	Operated by British United Air Ferries
Vickers Vanguard	1	1987	1995	Operated by Air Bridge Carriers

== Accidents and incidents ==
- On 13 February 2021, a Boeing 757-200PCF (registered G-DHKZ) returned to land at Leipzig/Halle Airport after its cargo door opened in-flight shortly after departure.

== See also ==
- DHL Aviation
- List of airlines of the United Kingdom
