= DHL Aero Expreso =

Panamanian airline

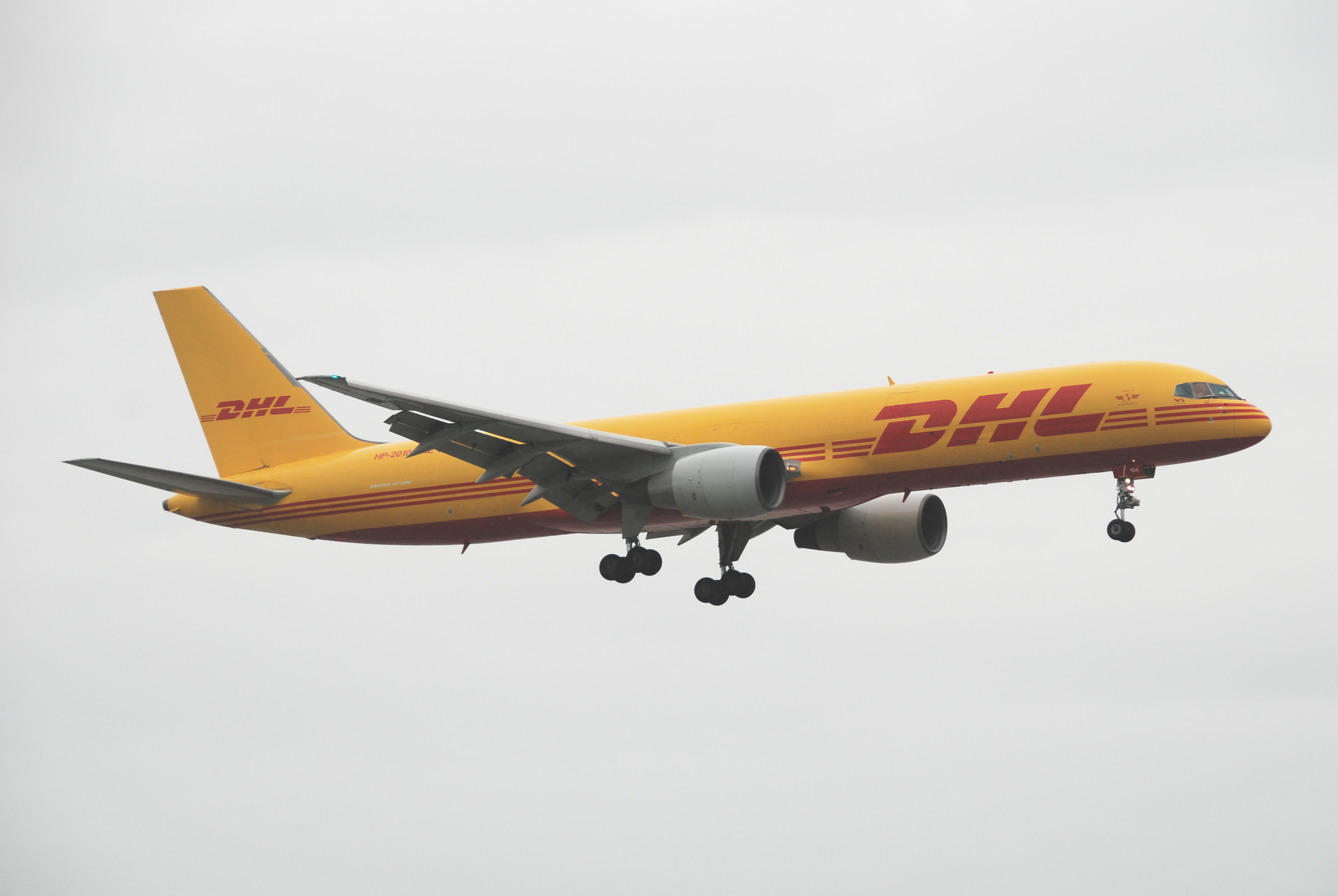
- DHL Aero Expreso Boeing 757-200PCF
IATA	ICAO	Call sign
D5	DAE	YELLOW
- Founded: February 1996
- Commenced operations: August 15, 1996
- Hubs: Tocumen International Airport
- Secondary hubs: Miami International Airport
- Subsidiaries: DHL Ecuador; DHL de Guatemala
- Fleet size: 10
- Destinations: 17
- Parent company: DHL (49%)
- Headquarters: Tocumen International Airport, Panama City, Panama
- Key people: Pablo Rousselin (Managing Director); Patricia Roman (Technical Operations Director); Jairo Guardia (Flight Operations Director)
- Founder: Felix Picardi
- Employees: 482 (2023)
- Website: www.dhl.com

DHL Aero Expreso S.A. is a cargo airline based out of Panama City, Panama. It is partly owned by the DHL Group and operates the group's DHL-branded parcel and express services in Central and South America. Its main base is Tocumen International Airport, Panama City.

== History ==
The airline was established in February 1996 and started operations on August 15, 1996. It began operations with charter flights, but added scheduled services on November 7, 1996. It is owned by Felix Picardi (51%) and DHL (49%) and has 482 employees in Panama (as of May 2023). Since April 2020, Pablo Rousselin has been the current Managing Director, replacing Steve Getzler after his retirement.

== Destinations ==
DHL Aero Expreso operates freight services to the following scheduled international destinations (as of October 2023):

Country	City	Airport	Notes	Refs
Argentina	Buenos Aires	Ministro Pistarini International Airport		
Aruba	Oranjestad	Queen Beatrix International Airport		
Barbados	Bridgetown	Grantley Adams International Airport		
Chile	Santiago	Arturo Merino Benítez International Airport		
Colombia	Bogotá	El Dorado International Airport		
Costa Rica	San José	Juan Santamaría International Airport		
Curaçao	Willemstad	Curaçao International Airport		
Ecuador	Guayaquil	José Joaquín de Olmedo International Airport		
Ecuador	Quito	Mariscal Sucre International Airport		
El Salvador	San Salvador	El Salvador International Airport		
Guatemala	Guatemala City	La Aurora International Airport		
Honduras	La Ceiba	Golosón International Airport	Terminated	
Mexico	Mexico City	Mexico City International Airport		
Panama	Panama City	Tocumen International Airport	Hub	
Peru	Lima	Jorge Chávez International Airport		
Puerto Rico	San Juan	Luis Muñoz Marín International Airport		
Trinidad and Tobago	Port of Spain	Piarco International Airport		
United States	Miami	Miami International Airport	Hub	
Venezuela	Caracas	Simón Bolívar International Airport		

== Fleet ==
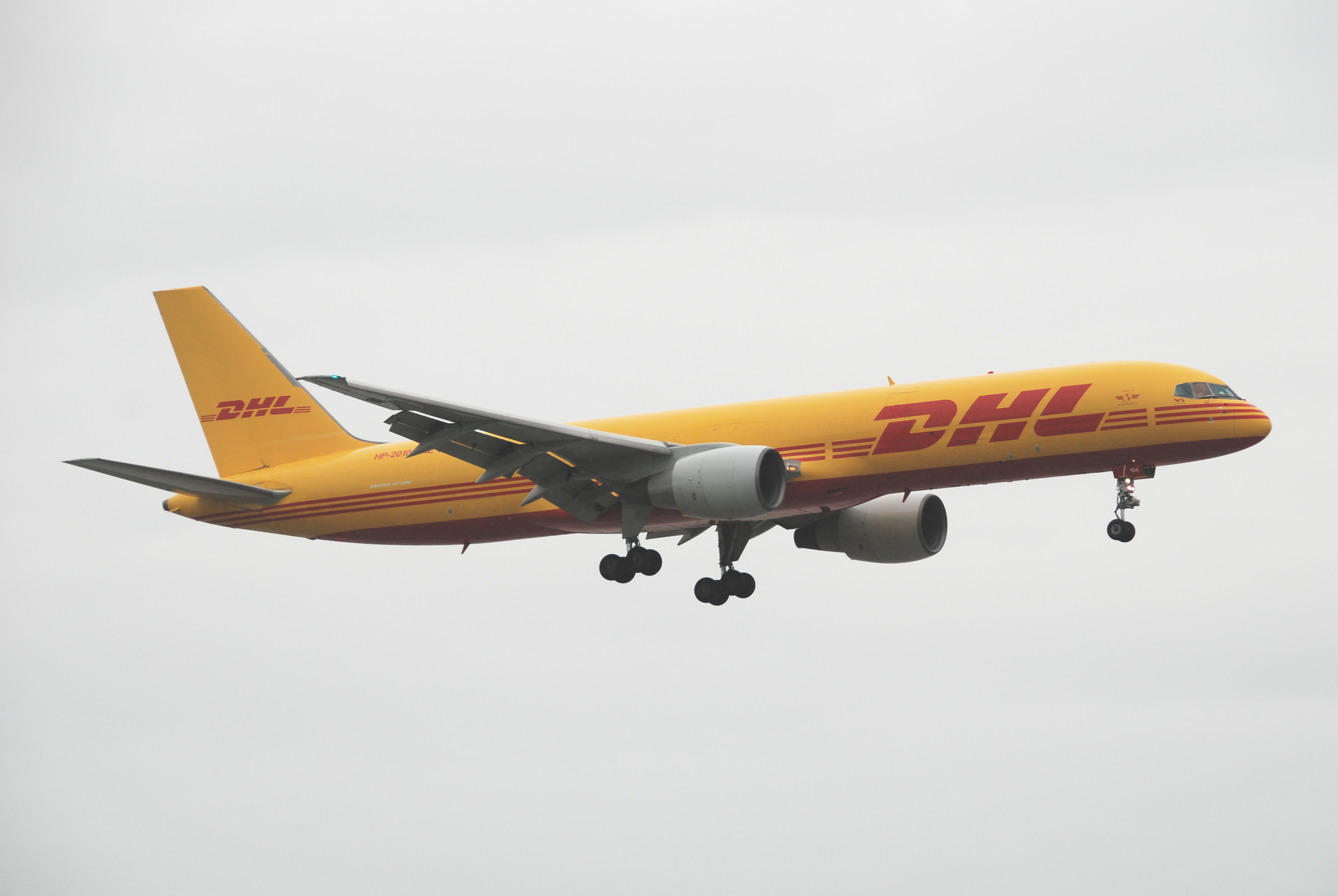
DHL Aero Expreso Boeing 757-200PCF This Aircraft would later crash as DHL de Guatemala Flight 7216

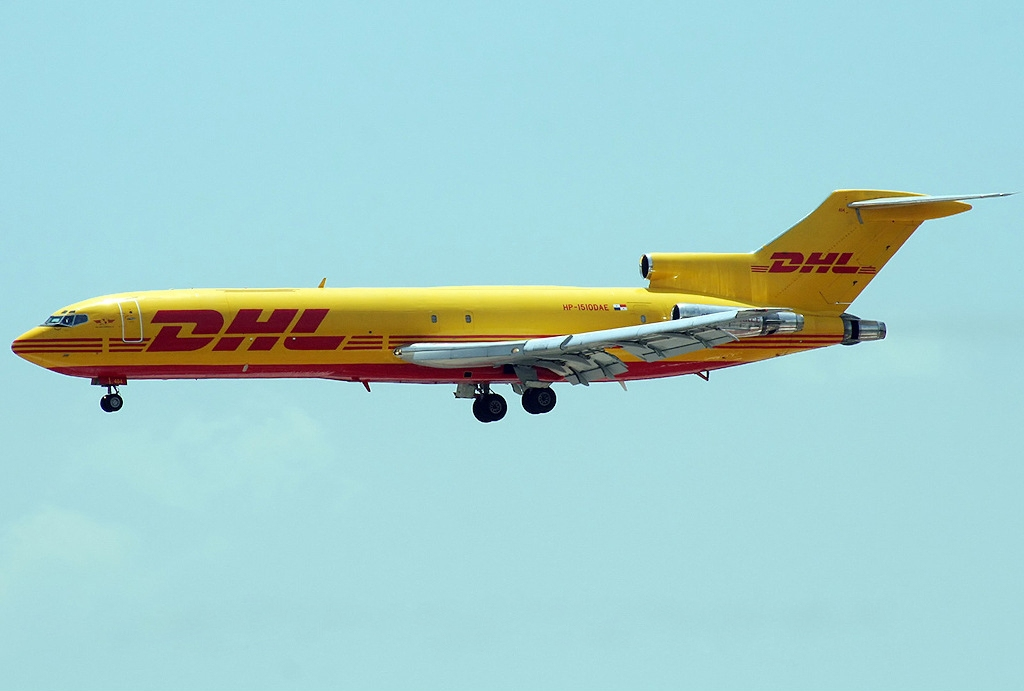
A former DHL Aero Expreso Boeing 727-200F in 2007

=== Current fleet ===
As of August 2025, DHL Aero Expreso operates the following aircraft:

DHL Aero Expreso fleet
Aircraft	In service	Orders	Notes
Boeing 757-200PCF	4	—	One crashed as DHL de Guatemala Flight 7216
Boeing 767-300BCF	6	—	
Total	10	—	

=== Former fleet ===
DHL Aero Expreso formerly also operated the following aircraft types:

- Boeing 727-200F
- Boeing 737-400SF

== Accidents and incidents ==
- On April 7, 2022, DHL de Guatemala Flight 7216, a Boeing 757-200PCF (registered HP-2010DAE) from DHL Aero Expreso while operating for DHL de Guatemala, made an emergency landing after taking off from Juan Santamaría International Airport due to hydraulic issues. After the aircraft landed back, it veered off the runway and broke up into two parts after falling into a ditch. The accident caused No casualties nor injuries. The airport was shut down for several hours after the crash and the aircraft was written off.

== See also ==
- List of airlines of Panama
